= List of Romanian writers =

This is a list of Romanian writers.

== Literature ==
=== Old literature ===
- Neagoe Basarab (c. 1459–1521)
- Mihail Moxa (1550–before 1650)
- Dosoftei (1624–1693)
- Grigore Ureche (1590–1647)
- Miron Costin (1633–1691)
- Ion Neculce (1672–1744)
- Antim Ivireanul (1650–1717)
- Constantin Cantacuzino (1639–1716)
- Dimitrie Cantemir (1673–1723)
- Costache Conachi (1778-1849)
- Gheorghe Asachi (1788–1869)

=== Transylvanian School (Școala Ardeleană) ===
- Samuil Micu-Klein (1745–1806)
- Gheorghe Șincai (1754-1816)
- Petru Maior (1756-1821)
- Ion Budai-Deleanu (1760-1820)

=== 19th century ===
==== Romantic writers ====
- Dinicu Golescu (1777–1830)
- Anton Pann (1790s–1854)
- Ion Heliade-Rădulescu (1802–1872)
- Grigore Alexandrescu (1810–1885)
- Constantin Negruzzi (1808–1868)
- Ion Ghica (1817–1897)
- Nicolae Filimon (1819–1865)
- Alexandru Odobescu (1834–1895)
- Bogdan Petriceicu-Hasdeu (1838–1907)
- Petre Ispirescu (1830–1887)
- Alexandru Odobescu (1834–1895)
- Alecu Russo (1819–1859)
- Cezar Bolliac (1813–1881)
- Barbu Delavrancea (1858–1918)
- Octavian Goga (1881–1938)
- Vasile Alecsandri (1821–1890)
- Alexandru Macedonski (1854–1920)
- George Coșbuc (1866–1918)

==== The classics ====
- Ion Creangă (1839–1889)
- Ioan Slavici (1848–1925)
- Mihai Eminescu (1850–1889)
- Ion Luca Caragiale (1852–1912)

=== Inter-war literature ===
==== Transition literature ====
- Duiliu Zamfirescu (1858–1922)
- Alexandru Davila (1862–1929)
- Gala Galaction (1879–1961)
- Constantin Stere (1865–1936)
- Nicolae Iorga (1871–1940)
- George Topîrceanu (1886–1937)

==== Analytical prose ====
- Anton Holban (1902–1937)
- Gib Mihăescu (1894–1935)
- Hortensia Papadat-Bengescu (1876–1955)
- Camil Petrescu (1894–1957)
- Mihail Sebastian (1907–1945)

==== Realist prose ====
- Ion Marin Sadoveanu (1893–1964)
- Eugeniu Botez (1877–1933)
- Eugen Lovinescu (1881–1943)
- Cezar Petrescu (1892–1961)
- Liviu Rebreanu (1885–1944)
- Mihail Sadoveanu (1889–1961)
- Vasile Voiculescu (1884–1963)
- George Călinescu (1899–1965)
- Zaharia Stancu (1902–1974)

==== Poetic novels ====
- Tudor Arghezi (1880–1967)
- Mateiu Caragiale (1885-1936)
- Ioan Vinea (1895-1964)

==== Fantastic prose ====
- Mircea Eliade (1907–1986)
- Max Blecher (1909–1938)
- Vasile Voiculescu (1884–1963)
- Gellu Naum (1915–2001)

==== Great poets ====
- George Bacovia (1881–1957)
- Tudor Arghezi (1880–1967)
- Ion Barbu (1895–1961)
- Lucian Blaga (1895–1961)
- Ion Vinea (1895–1964)
- Ion Pillat (1891–1945)
- Ion Minulescu (1881–1944)

==== Others ====
- Urmuz (1883–1923)
- Ion Grămadă (1886–1917)
- Panait Istrati (1884–1935)
- Ionel Teodoreanu (1897–1954)
- Victor Eftimiu (1889–1972)
- Tudor Mușatescu (1903–1970)
- George Ciprian (1883–1968)
- Geo Bogza (1908–1993)
- Eugène Ionesco (1909–1994)
- Emil Cioran (1911–1995)
- Martha Bibescu (1886–1973)
- Elena Văcărescu (1864–1947)

=== Post-war period ===
==== Mainstream prose ====
- Radu Tudoran (1910–1992)
- Eugen Jebeleanu (1911–1991)
- Emil Botta (1911–1977)
- Constantin Virgil Gheorghiu (1916–1992)
- Gellu Naum (1915–2001)
- Marin Preda (1922–1980)
- Ștefan Augustin Doinaș (1922–2002)
- Petru Dumitriu (1924–2002)
- Constantin Chiriță (1925–1991)
- A. E. Baconsky (1925–1977)
- Eugen Barbu (1924–1993)
- Nicolae Breban (born 1934)
- Alexandru Ivasiuc (1933–1977)
- Dumitru Radu Popescu (born 1935)
- Marin Preda (1922–1980)
- Dinu Săraru (born 1932)
- Zaharia Stancu (1902–1974)
- Ioan Alexandru (1941–2000)
- Titus Popovici (1930–1994)
- Dumitru Solomon (1932–2003)
- Dumitru Țepeneag (born 1937)
- Valentin Serbu (1933–1994)
- Petre Luscalov (1927–2004)

==== Prose ====
- Geo Bogza (1908–1993)
- Constantin Chiriță (1925–1991)
- Radu Tudoran (1917–1992)
- Haralamb Zincă (1923–2008)
- Doru Davidovici (1945–1989)

==== Poetry ====
- Mihai Beniuc (1907–1998)
- Leonid Dimov (1926–1987)
- Carmen Firan (born 1958)
- Nicolae Labiș (1935–1956)
- Ion Pillat (1891–1945)
- Marin Sorescu (1936–1996)
- Nichita Stănescu (1933–1983)
- Grete Tartler (born 1948)
- Dorin Tudoran (born 1945)
- Paul Damian (born 1995)

=== Romanian diaspora ===
- Matei Călinescu (born 1934)
- Andrei Codrescu (born 1946)
- Virgil Gheorghiu (1916–1992)
- Paul Goma (1935–2020)
- Leonard Oprea (born 1953)
- Dumitru Țepeneag (born 1937)
- Herta Müller (born 1953)
- Bogdan Suceavă (born 1969)

=== Contemporary writers ===
- Augustin Buzura (born 1938)
- Mirel Cană (1957-2020), who also wrote as Șerban Alexandru
- Ionuț Caragea (born 1975)
- Mircea Cărtărescu (born 1956)
- Gabriela Adameșteanu (born 1942)
- Carmen-Francesca Banciu (born 1955)
- T. O. Bobe (born 1969)
- Rodica Bretin (born 1958)
- Ioan Mihai Cochinescu (born 1951)
- Ion Hobana (born 1931)
- Rodica Ojog-Brașoveanu (1939–2002)
- Mircea Nedelciu (1950–1999)
- Leonard Oprea (born 1953)
- Dora Pavel (born 1946)
- Nicolae Breban (born 1934)
- Filip Florian (born 1967)
- Doina Ruști (born 1957)
- Radu Aldulescu (born 1954)
- Dumitru Găleșanu (born 1955)
- Dan Lungu (born 1969)
- Gelu Vlașin (born 1966)
- Igor Ursenco (born 1971)
- Bogdan Suceavă (born 1969)

}}

== Essays and philosophy ==
=== 20th century ===
- Constantin Rădulescu-Motru (1868–1957)
- Lucian Blaga (1895–1961)
- Emil Cioran (1911–1995)
- Ioan Petru Culianu (1950–1991)
- Mircea Eliade (1907–1986)
- Nae Ionescu (1890–1940)
- Constantin Noica (1909–1987)
- Nicolae Steinhardt (1912–1989)
- Petre Țuțea (1902–1991)
- Mircea Vulcănescu (1904–1952)

=== Contemporary ===
- Sorin Antohi (born 1957)
- Gabriel Liiceanu (born 1942)
- Andrei Pleșu (born 1948)
- Doina Ruști (born 1957)
- Bogdan Suceavă (born 1969)

== Literary criticism ==
- Titu Maiorescu (1840–1917)
- Eugen Lovinescu (1881–1946)
- George Călinescu (1889–1965)
- Tudor Vianu (1897–1964)
- Șerban Cioculescu (1902–1988)
- Nicolae Manolescu (1939–2024)
- Virgil Nemoianu (1940–2025)

== Drama ==
- Ion Luca Caragiale (1852–1912)
- Eugène Ionesco (1909–1994)
- Mihail Sebastian (1907–1945)
- Tudor Mușatescu (1930–1980)
- Marin Sorescu (1936–1997)

== See also ==
- Literature of Romania
- List of Romanian women writers
- List of Romanian language poets
- List of Romanian novelists
- List of Romanian playwrights
