= List of Romanian women writers =

This is a list of women writers who were born in Romania or whose writings are closely associated with that country.

== A ==
- Gabriela Adameșteanu (born 1942), novelist, short story writer, essayist, journalist, translator
- Florența Albu (1934–2000), poet

== B ==
- Elena Bacaloglu (1878–1947), journalist, critic, novelist, fascist militant
- Maria Baciu (born 1942), poet, novelist, children's writer, critic
- Maria Baiulescu (1860–1941), writer, women's rights activist
- Zsófia Balla (born 1949) prominent Romanian-born Hungarian poet, essayist
- Carmen-Francesca Banciu (born 1955), novelist
- Linda Maria Baros (born 1981), Romanian-born highly acclaimed French-language poet, translator, critic
- Marthe Bibesco (1886–1973), novelist, short story writer, essayist, writing in French
- Adriana Bittel (born 1946), poet, critic
- Ana Blandiana (born 1942), poet, essayist, political figure
- Calypso Botez (1880–1933), writer, women's rights activist
- Rodica Bretin (born 1958), fantasy novelist, non-fiction historical works, translator

== C ==
- Nina Cassian (1924–2014), poet, translator, journalist, critic
- Otilia Cazimir (1884–1967), poet, novelist, children's writer, translator
- Ruxandra Cesereanu (born 1963), poet, essayist, short story writer, novelist, critic
- Sofia Cocea (1839–1861), Moldavian-born essayist, journalist, poet
- Mariana Codruț (born 1956), poet, novelist, journalist
- Lena Constante (1909–2005), artist, essayist, known for her autobiography written in French
- Ioana Crăciunescu (born 1950), poet, actress
- Gabriella Csire (born 1938), Hungarian-Romanian children's writer, columnist, editor

== D ==
- Cella Delavrancea (1887–1991), pianist, essayist, short story writer, novelist
- Elena Djionat (1888–fl.1936), educator, journalist, women's rights activist
- Bucura Dumbravă (1868–1926), Hungarian-born Romanian genre novelist, writing mainly in German
- Zoe Dumitrescu-Bușulenga (1920–2006), magazine publisher, non-fiction author, essayist

== E ==
- Elisabeth of Wied (1843–1916), Queen Consort of Romania, poet, novelist, essayist, writing in German, Romanian, French and English under the pen name Carmen Sylvia

== F ==
- Elena Farago (1878–1954), poet, children's writer
- Carmen Firan (born 1958), poet, novelist, short story writer, journalist, playwright, writing in Romanian and English
- Mária Földes (1925–1976), Romanian-Hungarian playwright, writing in Hungarian

== G ==
- Anneli Ute Gabanyi (born 1942), Romanian-born German-language political scientist, critic, journalist, philologist
- Anca Giurchescu (1930–2015), Romanian-Danish folk dance researcher and academic
- Delia Grigore (born 1972), Romani-language non-fiction writer, philologist, Romani rights activist

== H ==
- Iulia Hasdeu (1869–1888), poet, essayist, writing in French, died from tuberculosis when only 18

== I ==
- Dora d'Istria, pen name of Duchess Helena Koltsova-Massalskaya (1828–1888), narrative writer, essayist, feminist, writing mainly in French
- Nora Iuga (born 1931), poet, writer and translator

== L ==
- Monica Lovinescu (1923–2008), essayist, short story writer, critic, translator, journalist

== M ==
- Veronica Micle (1850–1889), Austrian-born Romanian poet
- Mărgărita Miller-Verghy (1865–1953), short story writer, journalist, novelist, critic, translator
- Claudia Moscovici (born 1969), Romanian-born American novelist
- Herta Müller (born 1953), Romanian-born German-language novelist, poet, essayist, Nobel prizewinner
- Alina Mungiu-Pippidi (born 1964), political scientist, journalist, essayist, playwright

== N ==
- Sofia Nădejde (1856–1946), journalist, non-fiction writer, women's rights activist
- Cristina Nemerovschi (born 1980), novelist, non-fiction writer
- Tatiana Niculescu Bran, non-fiction novelist, known for Deadly Confession (2006) which led to the film Beyond the Hills
- Anna de Noailles (1876–1933), French-language novelist, autobiographer, poet

== P ==
- Hortensia Papadat-Bengescu (1876–1955), novelist
- Dora Pavel (born 1946), novelist, short story writer, poet, journalist
- Laura Pavel (born 1968), essayist, critic, translator
- Ioana Pârvulescu (born 1960), novelist, translator, journalist
- Marta Petreu (born 1955), philosopher, critic, essayist, poet
- Elena Pop-Hossu-Longin (1856–1946), journalist, women's rights activist

== R ==
- Doina Ruști (born 1959), novelist, symbologist

== S ==
- Izabela Sadoveanu-Evan (1870–1941), literary critic, journalist, poet, feminist
- Cella Serghi (1907–1992), novelist
- Lucreția Suciu-Rudow (1859–1900), poet

== T ==
- Grete Tartler (born 1948), poet, translator and children's author

== V ==
- Elena Văcărescu (1864–1947), poet, novelist, memoirist, playwright, writing mainly in French

== See also ==
- List of women writers
