= Alajos Degré =

Hungarian writer, politician (1819–1896)

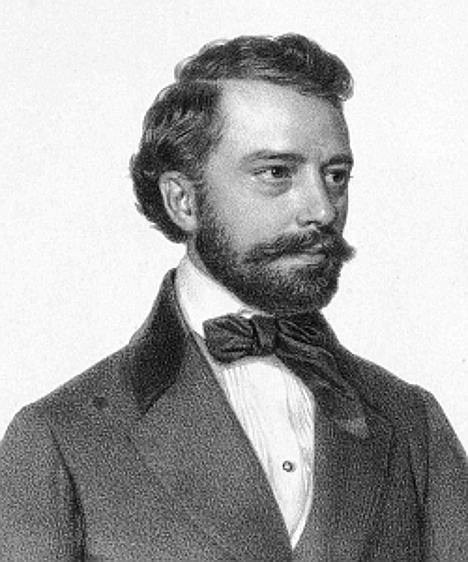
- Alajos Degré (1855)
- Born: 6 January 1819; Lippa, Austrian Empire
- Died: 1 November 1896 (aged 77); Budapest, Austria-Hungary
- Citizenship: Hungarian; French
- Education: Faculty of Law, Nagyvárad (1838–1840); Legal internship, Pest (1842–1843)
- Occupations: Lawyer; Legal historian
- Years active: 1843–?
- Known for: Hungarian Revolution of 1848
- Political party: Left Centre; Independence Party
- Spouse: Amália Anna Koller
- Children: Erzsébet; Miklós; Katalin; Etel; Andor; Éva; Lajos
- Parents: Peter Degré (father); Anna Rácz (mother)
- Relatives: Ignác (half-brother); Franciska (sister)

Alajos Degré (Lippa, Hungary (today in Romania), 6 January 1819 – Budapest, 1 November 1896) was a Hungarian lawyer, legal historian, author, playwright and one of the key figures of the Hungarian Revolution of 1848.

== Life ==
He was born to a middle-class, urban family. His father was a Frenchman who worked as the chief physician of Temes County, Hungary. His mother was Anna Rácz, the raised daughter of a Hungarian nobleman, György Návay. He had a half-brother, Ignác from his father's first marriage and a sister, Franciska. Because of his father's early death Temes County took over the costs of the education of the Degré children. He did his secondary-school studies in Arad and Szeged. Then he went to Nagyvárad where he studied law for two years. In 1842 he started to work as a jurist in Pest where he got interested in politics and made friends with Lajos Kossuth. The liberal ideas inflamed his thinking so he joined these political circles and took part on their events where he was asked to hold a welcome speech for Kossuth. In 1843 he took the attorney's examination and moved to Pozsony (today Bratislava, Slovakia) to work as a royal board notary at the National Assembly of Hungary.

== Personal life ==
He was married to Amália Anna Koller. They had together seven children – four daughters and three sons:

- Erzsébet
- Miklós
- Katalin
- Etel
- Andor (1869–1939)
- Éva
- Lajos (1882–1915)

== Works ==
- Iparlovag – Pozsony, 1844 (premiere at the National Theatre: 12 February 1844)
- Eljegyzés álarc alatt – Pest, 1845 (premiere at the National Theatre: 14 April 1845)
- Félreismert lángész – Pest, 1846 (premiere at the National Theatre: 16 February 1846)
- Kedélyrajzok – Pest, 1847
- Két év egy ügyvéd életéből – Pest, 1853
- Degré Alajos Novellái – Pest, 1854
- Kalandornő – Pest, 1854
- Salvator Rosa – Pest, 1855
- A sors keze – Pest, 1856
- Novellák – Pest, 1857
- Az ördög emlékiratai – Pest, 1860
- A száműzött leánya – Pest, 1865
- A kék vér – Pest, 1870
- A nap hőse – Pest, 1870. Két kötet
- Itthon – Budapest, 1877. Két kötet
- Az elzárt gyámleány – Budapest, 1878
- Bőkezű uzsorás – Budapest, 1882
- Visszaemlékezéseim – Budapest, 1883–1884
- Így van jól! – Budapest, 1887

== Literature ==
- József Szinnyei József: Magyar írók élete és munkái II, Budapest, 1893.
- Ernő Vende : Irodalom, tudomány és művészet
