= Ionuț Caragea =

Romanian writer

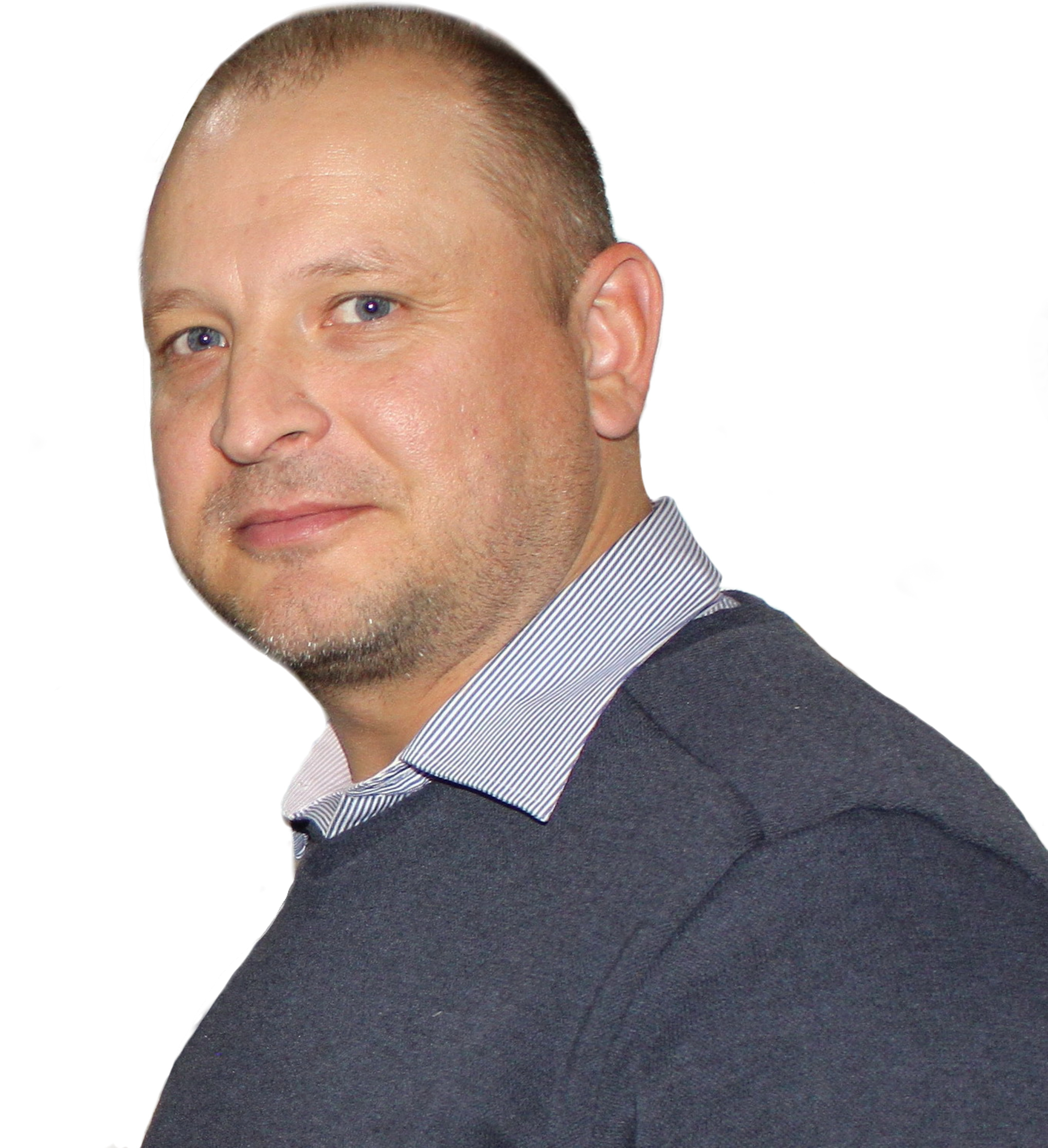
- Ionuț Caragea in 2017
- Born: April 12, 1975 (age 51); Constanța, Socialist Republic of Romania
- Occupation: Writer
- Writing career
- Pen name: Snowdon King
- Language: Romanian, French
- Period: 2003 – present
- Movements: Avant-gardism, transmodernism, neomodernism, paradoxism, 2000 poetic generation
- Website: ionutcaragea.ro

Signature
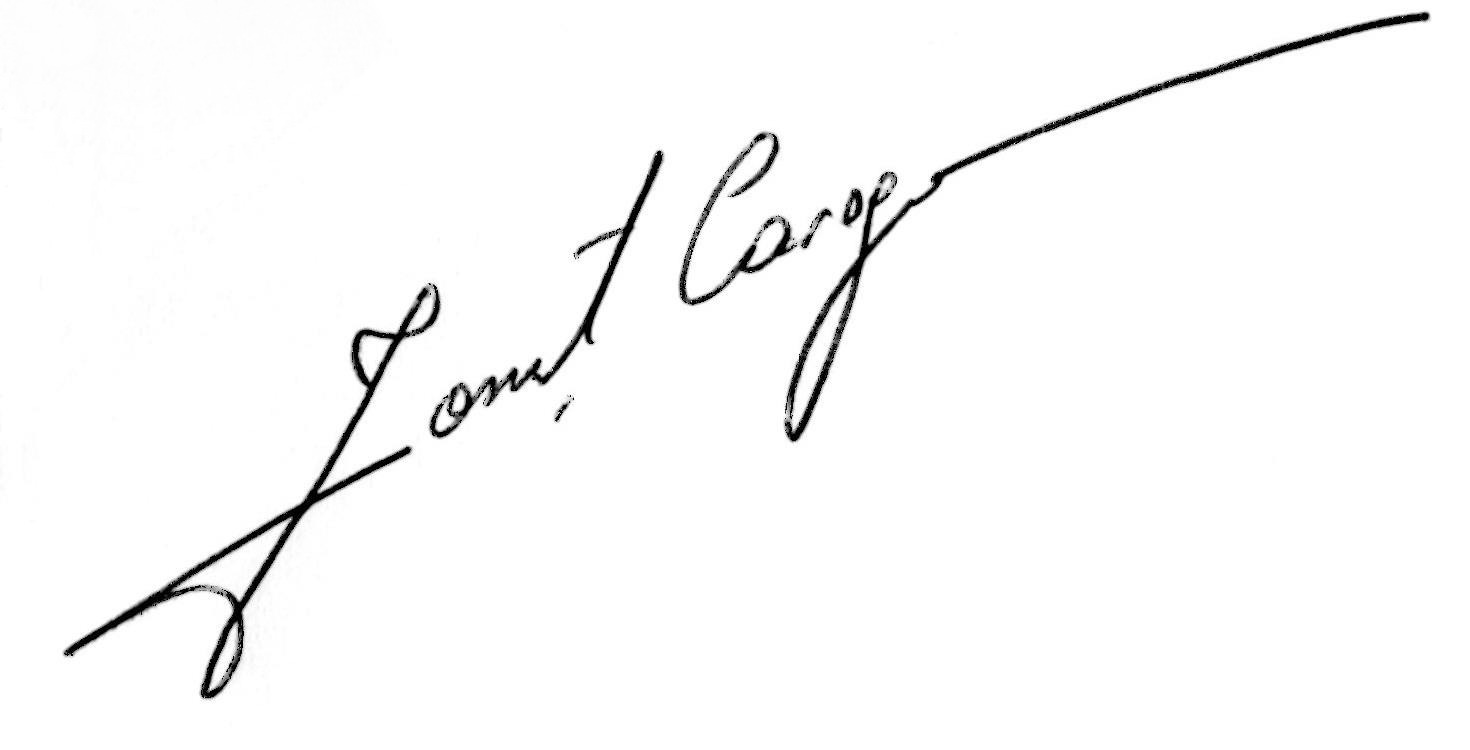

Ionuț Caragea (Romanian pronunciation: [joˈnuts karaˈdʒe̯a]; born April 12, 1975) is a Romanian writer living in Oradea, Romania. Romanian literary critics see him as one of the leaders of the 2000 poetic generation (some critics even considered him the undisputed leader of this generation) and one of the most atypical and original writers of today's Romania.

He is also known in France, where he has published several books translated or written directly into French, thus becoming a member of the Société des Poètes Français and a member of the Société des poètes et artistes de France. Giovanni Dotoli, one of the leading personalities of Francophonie, analyzing the volume of poems "Mon amour abyssal", considers that Caragea is a poet who honors Romania and European literature. Caragea has been awarded three times by the Society of French Poets and four other prizes were awarded by the Society of French Poets and Artists. In 2021, he received the "Genius" prize from the Naji Naaman Foundation, an award given only four times between 2002 and 2021.

== Biography ==
Caragea was born on April 12, 1975, in Constanța. He is a poet, prose writer, literary critic, editor, aphorism-writer, and cultural promoter. He is a member of the Romanian Writers’ Union, the Cluj-Napoca branch, a co-founder and vice-chairman of the Romanian Writers’ Association of Québec, an honorary member of the Writers’ Society of Neamț County, an honorary member of the Maison Naaman pour Culture Foundation of Lebanon, a member of Elis (the worldwide remarkable Romanians’ Network), an honorary member of the International Association of Paradoxism, a member of the Diversité Artistique Cultural Organization of Montréal, a member of the Poetas del Mundo Cultural Organization of Chile, etc. As a result of his friendship and name relation with Prince Eugen Enea Caraghiaur, in 2008 he was raised to the noble rank of Baron of the Cuman House of Panciu. He started his literary career in 2006, with a collection of poems – Delirium Tremens (STEF Publishing House, Iași). His poems, aphorisms, short stories, and critical essays have appeared in various magazines, newspapers, and anthologies in Romania and the Romanian diaspora. He is one of the twenty authors who were published in Antologia aforismului românesc contemporan/An Anthology of Contemporary Romanian Aphorisms (Genesi Publishing House, Turin, 2013), and one of the twenty-seven authors who were published in Antologia aforismului românesc contemporan/An Anthology of Contemporary Romanian Aphorisms (Digital Unicorn Publishing House, Constanța, 2016). Following the 2012 Naji Naaman International Contest, he was awarded the Creativity Prize for aphorisms from his collection Dicționarul suferinței/A Dictionary of Suffering (Fides Publishing House, Iași, 2008), translated into French by Professor Constantin Frosin, PhD. He is included in Cartea înțelepciunii universale. Maxime și cugetări din literatura universală/A Book of World Wisdom. Maxims and Thoughts from World Literature (eLiteratura Publishing House, Bucharest, 2014). He is also included in Alertă de grad zero în proza scurtă românească actuală/Red Alert in Today's Romanian Short Story Writing (Herg Benet Publishing House, 2012). He has won several poetry and short story contests. Some of his work has been translated into six languages: English, French, Spanish, Italian, Arabic and Albanian. He was nicknamed "The poet who was born on Google" after the title of his book M-am născut pe Google/I Was Born on Google (STEF Publishing House, Iași, 2007). In 2012, the English version of his science fiction novel Uezen was published by Wildside Press (US).

In 2003-2011 he lived in Montréal, Canada, where he received the Canadian citizenship (2008). He worked as a sports instructor and professional sportsman, continuing his rugby career which he started in Romania. He is the son of a former Romanian rugby player, Florin Caragea, who played for Farul Constanța. Ionuț Caragea played for Parc Olympique and won the Québec province championship three times.

He started writing poetry in his teens but it was in Canada that he discovered his true calling. His first poems were published on April 6, 2006, in "Observatorul," a literary magazine from Toronto, where he was welcomed by the poet George Filip. Then he was promoted by the editor Dumitru Scorțanu, who published his first three books at STEF Publishing House, Iași. On July 16, 2008, he founded, together with the poet Adrian Erbiceanu, The Romanian Writers’ Association of Québec and the ASLRQ Publishing House. As an editor and founder of ASLRQ, in 2009 he compiled, together with Adrian Erbiceanu and Dumitru Scorțanu, the first anthology of Romanian writers from Québec, a very important work for the diaspora. He committed himself to promoting Romanian culture in North America, being webmaster, webdesigner, and literary promoter for the site of the Romanian Writers’ Association of Québec (www.aslrq.ro), and founder of the Prietenii Poeziei/Poetry's Friends Literary Society. In February 2012 he returned to Romania and settled in Oradea. In 2014 the eLiteratura Publishing House published his latest collections of poems that were welcomed by the poet Ana Blandiana with a text on the back cover of his Cer fără scări/Stepless Sky. In 2015 he coordinated the 2015 ASLRQ anthology. He has published more than 50 books (poems, aphorisms, science fiction, critical essays, thoughts on spirituality, memoirs, and anthologies). Romanian literary critics see him as one of the leaders of the 2000 poetic generation (some critics even considered him the undisputed leader of this generation) and one of the most atypical and original writers of today's Romania. The critic Maria-Ana Tupan believes that the poet Ionuț Caragea sometimes reminds one of Marin Sorescu, a great Romanian writer.

== Works ==
- Delirium Tremens, Ed. STEF, 2006 (poetry in Romanian)
- M-am născut pe Google, Ed. STEF, 2007 (poetry in Romanian)
- Donator universal, Ed. STEF, 2007 (poetry in Romanian)
- Omul din cutia neagră, Ed. Fides din Iaşi, 2007 (poetry in Romanian)
- 33 bis, Ed. Fides, 2008 (poetry in Romanian)
- Analfabetism literar, Ed. Fides, 2008 (poetry in Romanian)
- Dicţionarul suferinţei, Ed. Fides, 2008 (quotes in Romanian)
- Negru Sacerdot, Ed. Fides, 2008 (poetry in Romanian)
- Absenţa a ceea ce suntem, Ed. Fides, 2009 (poetry in Romanian)
- Snowdon King - La suprême émotion, Ed. ASLRQ, 2009 (poetry in French)
- Déconnecté, Ed. ELMIS, 2009 (poetry in French)
- Guru amnezic, Ed. Fides, 2009 (poetry in Romanian)
- Literatura virtuală și Curentul Generației Google, Ed. Fides, 2009 (essays, interviews in Romanian)
- Poezii de dragoste, Ed. Fides, 2010 (poetry in Romanian)
- Dicționarul suferinţei, vol. II, Ed. Fides, 2010 (quotes in Romanian)
- Snowdon King - Uezen și alte povestiri, Ed. Fides, 2010 (science fiction in Romanian)
- Snowdon King - Conștiința lui Uezen, SF, Ed. Fides, 2010 (science fiction in Romanian)
- Snowdon King - Uezen. Echilibrul lumilor, SF, Ed. Fides, 2011 (science fiction in Romanian)
- Suflet zilier, Ed. Fides, 2011 (poetry in Romanian)
- Esenţe lirice, cronici literare 2007-2011, Ed. Fides, 2011 (literary chronicles in Romanian)
- Gîndul meu. Cum am devenit Poet, Ed. Fides, 2011 (Novel in Romanian)
- Întreita suferință, Ed. Fides, 2011 (quotes in Romanian)
- Snowdon King - Uezen, Ed. Wildside Press, U.S.A, 2012 (science fiction in English)
- Patria la care mă întorc, Ed. Fides, 2012 (poetry in Romanian)
- Antologie de Poeme 2006-2012, Ed. Fides, 2013 (poetry in Romanian)
- Delir cu tremurături de gînduri. Citate şi aforisme 2006-2013, Ed. Fides, 2013 (quotes in Romanian)
- Festina lente, Ed. eLiteratura, 2014 (poetry in Romanian ans Spanish)
- Cer fără scări / Ciel sans escalier, Ed. eLiteratura, 2014 (poetry in French)
- Discipolii zeilor de altădată, Ed. eLiteratura, 2015 (science fiction in Romanian)
- În așteptarea păsării, Ed. eLiteratura, 2015 (poetry and quotes in Romanian)
- Ascultă-ți gândul și împlinește-ți visele, Ed. eLiteratura, 2016 (Novel in Romanian)
- Umbră lucidă, Ed. Fides, 2016 (poetry in Romanian)
- Mesaj către ultimul om de pe Pământ, Ed. Fides, 2017 (poetry in Romanian)
- Eu la pătrat, Ed. Fides, 2017 (poetry and quotes in Romanian)
- Din spuma valurilor, Ed. Fides, 2017 (quotes in Romanian)
- Mon amour abyssal, Ed. Stellamaris, Brest, France, 2018 (poetry in French)
- Cenuța din abis, Ed. Fides, 2018 (poetry in Romanian)
- Despletirea viselor, Ed. Princeps Multimedia, 2018 (poetry in Romanian)
- Aphorismes jaillis de l’écume des flots, Ed. Stellamaris, Brest, France, 2018 (quotes in French)
- Une étincelle dans le couloir des ombres, Ed. Stellamaris, Brest, France, 2019 (poetry in French)
- Roua infinitului, Ed. Digital Unicorn, 2019 (quotes in Romanian)
- Flori din părul veșniciei, Ed. Fides, 2019 (quotes in Romanian)
- Iubirea mea abisală, Ed. Fides, 2019 (poetry in Romanian)
- Je suis né sur Google, Ed. Stellamaris, Brest, France, 2019 (poetry in French)
- J’habite la maison aux fenêtres fermées, Ed. Stellamaris, Brest, France, 2019 (poetry in French)
- Eu la pătrat. Ediţia a doua adăugită, Ed. Fides, 2020 (poetry in Romanian)
- Locuiesc în casa cu ferestre închise, Ed. Fides, 2020 (poetry in Romanian)
- Homo Interneticus, Ed. Stellamaris, Brest, France, 2020 (science fiction in French)
- Gânduri pentru caricatura umbrei, Ed. Ecou Transilvan, 2020 (quotes in Romanian)
- O scânteie pe coridorul umbrelor, Ed. Ecou Transilvan, 2020 (poetry in Romanian)
- Esenţe lirice, vol. II, cronici literare 2011-2020, Ed. Rafet, 2020 (literary chronicles in Romanian)
- Infecté par l'amour, Ed. Stellamaris, Brest, France, 2020 (poetry in French)
- Infectat cu iubire, Ed. Fides, 2020 (poetry and quotes in Romanian)
- Cod roşu de furtună în suflet, poezii, Ed. Fides, 2021 (poetry in Romanian)
- M-am născut pe Google, Ed. Fides, 2021 (poetry and quotes in Romanian)
- Ceasornicarul fără mâini, Ed. ASLRQ, 2022 (poetry and quotes in Romanian)
- Căutătorul de amintiri, Ed. Fides, 2022 (poetry and quotes in Romanian)
- L'osmose des blessures, Ed. Stellamaris, Brest, France, 2023 (poetry in French)
- Je me rends au ciel, Ed. ASLRQ, Montréal, Canada, 2023 (poetry in French)

== Literary Prizes ==
- Honorable mention for the poem "L'écho des ailes inlassables" at the International Poetry Grand Prix organized by the Society of Poets and Artists of France, year 2022
- Honorable Mention in the L. Ron Hubbard Writers of the Future Contest, 4th Quarter, 2021, Hollywood, U.S.A., for the short story "Return to Virtuality," published under the pseudonym Snowdon King.
- First prize for the volume "Infectat cu iubire", at the CORONA International Literary Contest, 6th edition, 2021, organized by Traduzioni Talabà, Italy.
- Second prize for the poem "Odă poetului fără mască", at the CORONA International Literature Contest, 5th edition, 2020, organized by Traduzioni Talabà, Italy.
- Second prize in the Grand Prix "Jenny Alpha et Noël-Henri Villard", organized by the Society of Poets and Artists of France, 2021.
- Genius" prize at the "Naji Naaman" international competition in Lebanon, 2021 (awarded only four times between 2002 and 2021)
- Honorary diploma for the volume of poems "Infecté par l'amour", awarded in Paris by the Society of French Poets, 2020
- Second prize in the Grand Prix "Henri Meillant", organized by the Society of French Poets and Artists, 2020
- Third prize in the Grand Prix "Jenny Alpha et Noël-Henri Villard", organised by the Society of French Poets and Artists, 2020
- Grand Prize at the Titel Constantinescu International Festival of Literary Creation, 2020, for the volume of literary reviews "Esențe literare. Vol. II"
- 2020 - The Prize Mompezat 2019 (Paris, France)
- 2019 - The Prize François-Victor Hugo 2018 (Paris, France)
- 2018 - The Big Prize "Sapiens Piroboridava" at the International Festival of Aphorism for Romanians everywhere, Tecuci
- 2017 - Special Prize "Mihai Pauliuc" at the International Festival of Aphorism for Romanians everywhere, Tecuci
- 2016 - The Prize for Literary Criticism at the International Festival "eCreator", Baia Mare
- 2016 - 2nd prize - Romania over 100 years, Bucharest, Science Fiction
- 2012 – Creativity prize - Naji Naaman, Beirut, Lebanon, quotes
- Four prizes at the national short story competitions organized by Helion Club and Helion Magazine in Timisoara

== International critical acclaim ==
- Giovanni Dotoli on the volume of poems " Mon amour abyssal " in the journal "Revue européenne de recherches sur la poésie", Paris, France, no. 4 of 2018, pp. 250–251(in French)
- Dotoli on the volume of poems "Infecté par l'amour" in the magazine "Noria", Ed. L'Harmattan, Paris, France, no. 4 of 2022. Article accessed in Luceafărul magazine and on the Stellamaris publishing house website (in French)
- Dotoli on the volume of aphorisms "Aphorismes jaillis de l'écume des flots" in the magazine "Noria", Ed. L'Harmattan Paris, France, no. 3 of 2021. Article accessed in the magazine Harmonies Culturelles and on the website of the publisher Stellamaris (in French)
- Jean-Paul Gavard-Perret on the volume of aphorisms "Aphorismes jaillis de l'écume des flots" in Le Litteraire magazine in France, no. of 19 December 2018, article "La résurrection des Lazare"(in French)
- Gavard-Perret on the volume of poems "Ciel sans escalier" in Le Litteraire magazine of France, issue of 6 September 2015, article "Nadir latent"(in French)
- Gavard-Perret on the volume of poems "Mon amour abyssal" in the magazine Le Litteraire of France, issue of 13 July 2018, article "Mon amour abyssal"(in French)
- Gavard-Perret on the volume of poems "La suprême émotion" in the magazine "Incertain Regard" in France, issue of 25 September 2010, article "PASSAGE DES SEUILS"(in French)
- Gavard-Perret on the volume of poems "J'habite la maison aux fenêtres fermées" in the magazine Le Litteraire of France, issue of 23 September 2019, article "Lire en accordéon"(in French)
- Gavard-Perret on the volume of poems "Une étincelle dans le couloir des ombres" in the magazine Le Litteraire of France, issue of 14 March 2019, article "L'ombre et la lumière"(in French)
- Véronique Flabat-Piot about the volume of the poem "J'habite la maison aux fenêtres fermées" in "l'Anthologie de Poésie 2020", Éditions les Poètes Français, Paris, 2020, accessed by Ed. Stellamaris(in French)

== Bibliography ==
- 1500 Scriitori clasici și contemporani, Ed. Porțile Orientului, 2010, ISBN 978-973-7863-62-1, pag. 86(in Romanian)
- Dicționarul Scriitorilor Români de azi, Ed. Porțile Orientului, 2011, ISBN 978-973-7863-64-5, pag. 95(in Romanian)
- Literatura română. Dicționarul autorilor români contemporani, Alina Kristinka Cătunescu, Ed. ARIAL, Ploiești, 2013, ISBN 978-973-88659-1-4 (in Romanian)
- Antologia dell`aforisma romeno contemporaneo, Genesi Editrice, Italy, 2012, ISBN 9788874143887, pag. 35-41 (in Italian)
- Antologia Singur, 2010, Ed. Grinta, Cluj-Napoca, ISBN 978-606-92452-2-4 (in Romanian)
- Antologia Alertă de grad zero în proza scurtă românească actuală, Ed. Herg Benet, 2011, pag. 269, ISBN 978-606-92892-9-7 (in Romanian)
- Antologia Asociației Scriitorilor de Limbă Română din Québec, Montréal, Canada 2009, ISBN 978-2-923768-01-4 (in Romanian)
- Antologia Asociației Scriitorilor de Limbă Română din Québec, Montréal, Canada 2015, ISBN 978-2-923768-11-3(in Romanian)
- Cartea Înțelepciunii Universale, un dicționar de maxime și aforisme realizat de Nicolae Mareș. Ed. eLiteratura, Bucharest, 2014, 620 pag., ISBN 978-606-700-014-6 (in Romanian)
- Antologia aforismului românesc contemporan, Ed. Digital Unicorn, Constanța, 2016, ISBN 978-606-94193-0-4 (in Romanian)
- Andreea C. Petrache - The New Media Aesthetics and Young Bloggers. ASLRQ, nr. 13, 2022 ISSN 2668-7747

== Source of translation ==
This article contains a translation of Ionuț Caragea from ro.Wikipedia.
