= Scînteia =

Romanian newspaper

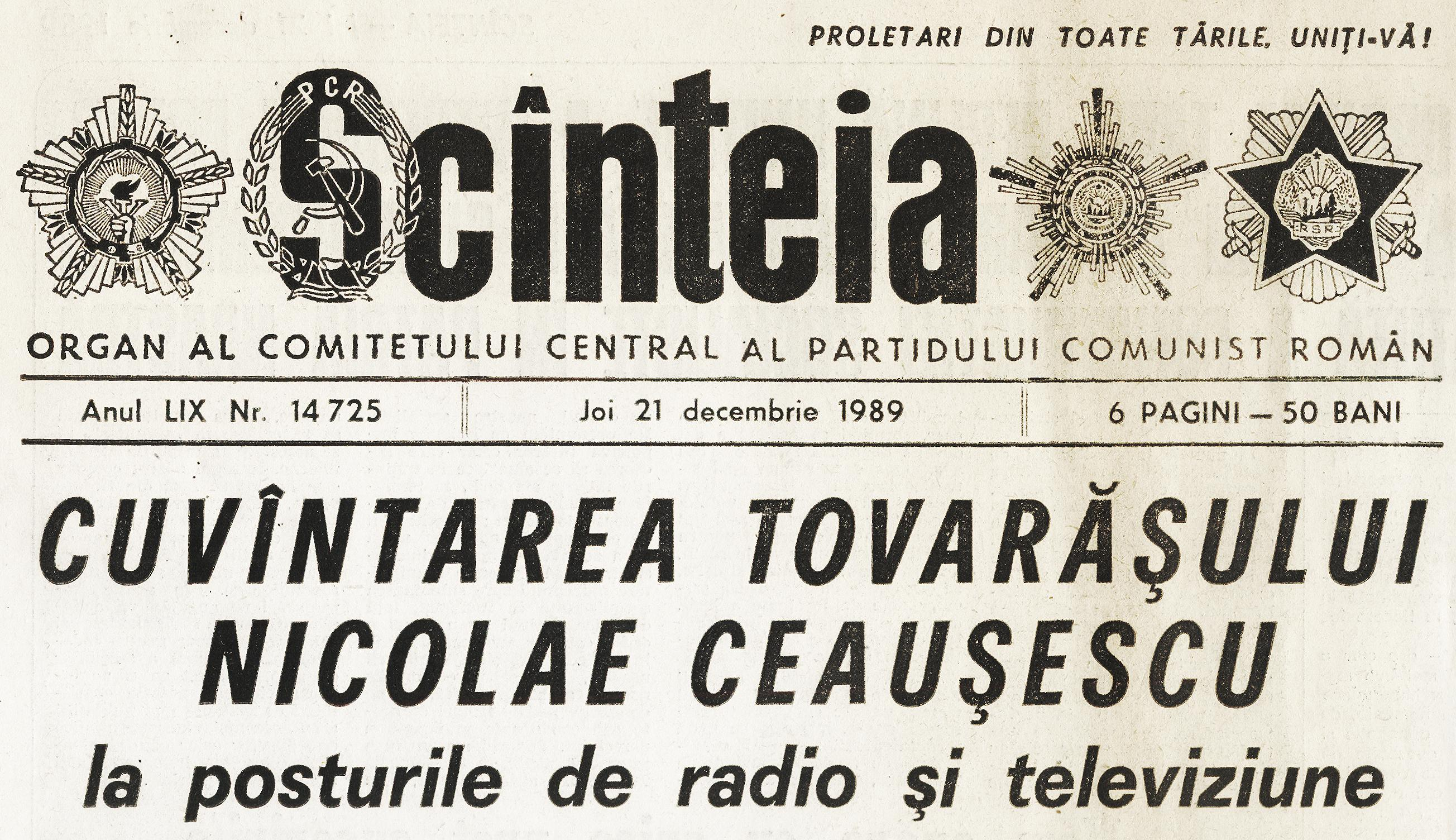
- The penultimate issue of Scînteia, 21 December 1989. The headline reads: "Comrade Nicolae Ceaușescu's speech for radio and television stations" (official answer to the outbreak of the Romanian Revolution)
- Type: Daily newspaper
- Format: A2
- Publisher: CC of the PCR
- Editor: Miron Constantinescu (first)
- Founded: August 15, 1931
- Ceased publication: 1989
- Political alignment: Far left
- Language: Romanian
- Headquarters: Bucharest
- City: Bucharest
- Country: Romania
- Circulation: 1.1 million (as of 1976)

Scînteia (Romanian for "The Spark") was the name of two newspapers edited by Communist groups at different intervals in Romanian history. The title is a homage to the Russian language paper Iskra. It was known as Scânteia until the 1953 spelling reform, which replaced the letter Â with the phonologically identical Î in all cases.

== History ==
=== 1919 in Odessa ===
The first paper of that name was edited by Romanian revolutionaries in Bolshevist Russia, appearing throughout 1919 in the city of Odessa.

=== In Romania (1931–1989) ===
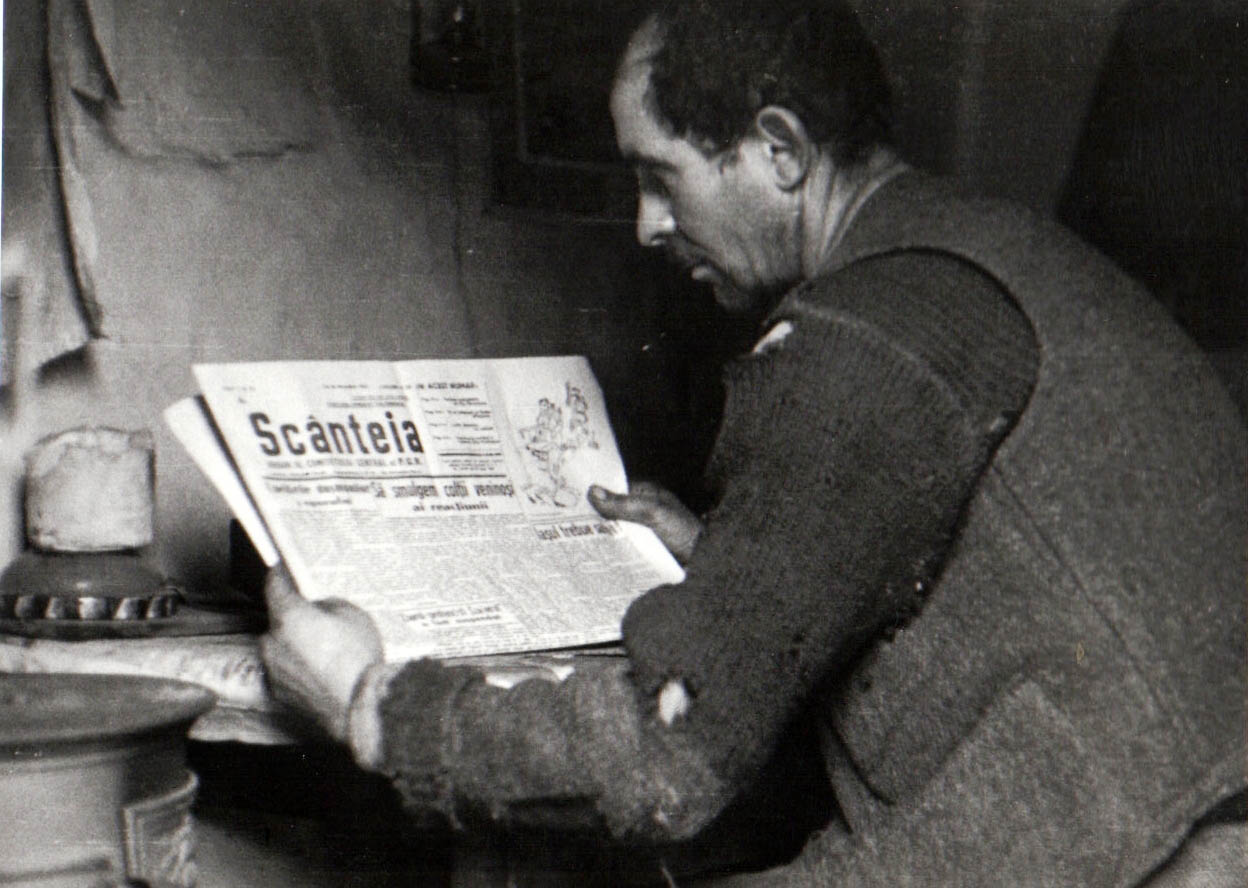
Miner reading Scânteia in 1944

Scânteia reemerged as the official voice of the Communist Party of Romania on August 15, 1931, being published clandestinely in Bucharest until 1940, when the hostility between Romania and the Soviet Union grew to a level where a crackdown on communist propaganda became imminent.

In the wake of King Michael's Coup of 23 August 1944 and Romania's withdrawing from the Axis and joining the Allies, Scânteia was yet again being published, to remain the approved, sanctioning, body of communist politics. During Communist Romania (since early 1948), the newspaper was the barometer of policy changes, and the main medium through which the regime indicated its aims (for example, Scînteia served as the tribune for slander campaigns against intellectuals such as Tudor Arghezi). Moreover, in 1961, August 15, the date on which the newspaper had first been published in Romania 30 years previously, was declared the Romanian Press Day — indicative of the relationship between the official voice and other media.

The headquarters of the paper were the main feature of the Socialist Realist Combinatul Poligrafic Casa Scînteii "I.V. Stalin", a name later reduced to Casa Scînteii, after it dropped the reference to Joseph Stalin during De-Stalinization. Today, the building goes by the name of the House of the Free Press (Casa Presei Libere).

Scînteia was accompanied by a youth version, one edited by the Union of Communist Youth (a branch of the Party that resembled the Soviet Komsomol, up to a point). Scînteia Tineretului (or Scânteia Tineretului; approximately "Youth's Spark") began its edition in November 1944. It was also published under the names of Tinerețea ("The Youth") and Tînărul Muncitor (or Tânărul Muncitor; "The Young Worker").

=== Fate after December 1989 ===
With the 1989 overthrow of the Communist regime came the outlawing of all Communist Party institutions, including all its newspapers, Scînteia's assets were mostly taken over by the post-communist Adevărul.

== Post-1944 editors in chief ==
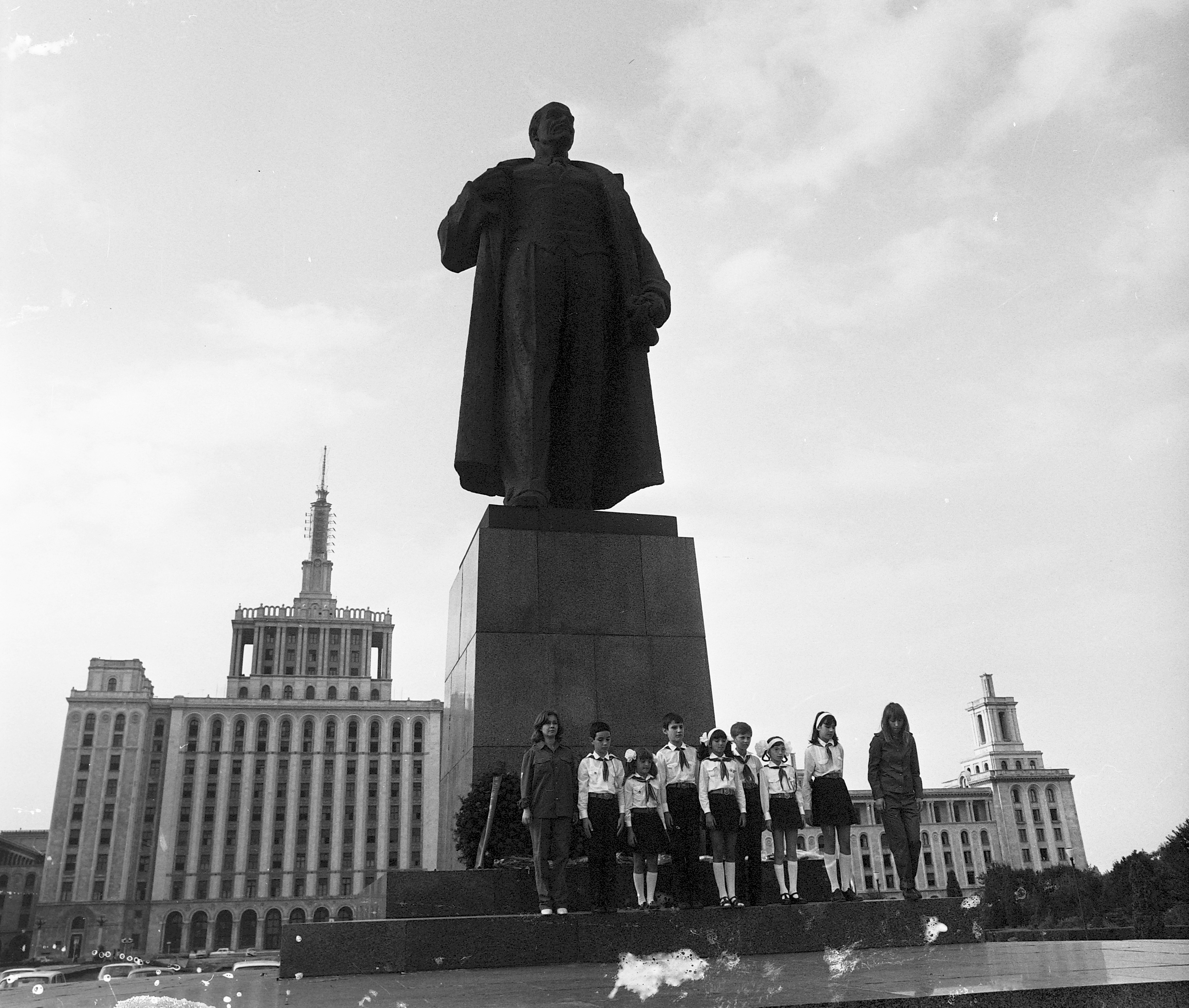
Gathering of Romanian young pioneers at Lenin's statue in front of the Casa Scînteii, 1977

- Miron Constantinescu (1944–1947)
- Sorin Toma (1947–1960)
- Theodor Marinescu (1960–1965)
- Dumitru Popescu (1965–1968)
- Alexandru Ionescu (1968–1978)
- Constantin Mitea (1978–1981)
- Ion Cumpănașu (1981–1984)
- Ion Mitran (1985–1989)

== Other staff ==
- Dic Baboian
- Silviu Brucan
- Constantin Chiriță
- Leonte Răutu

== See also ==
- Eastern Bloc information dissemination
