= Laura Pavel =

Romanian essayist and literary critic (born 1968)

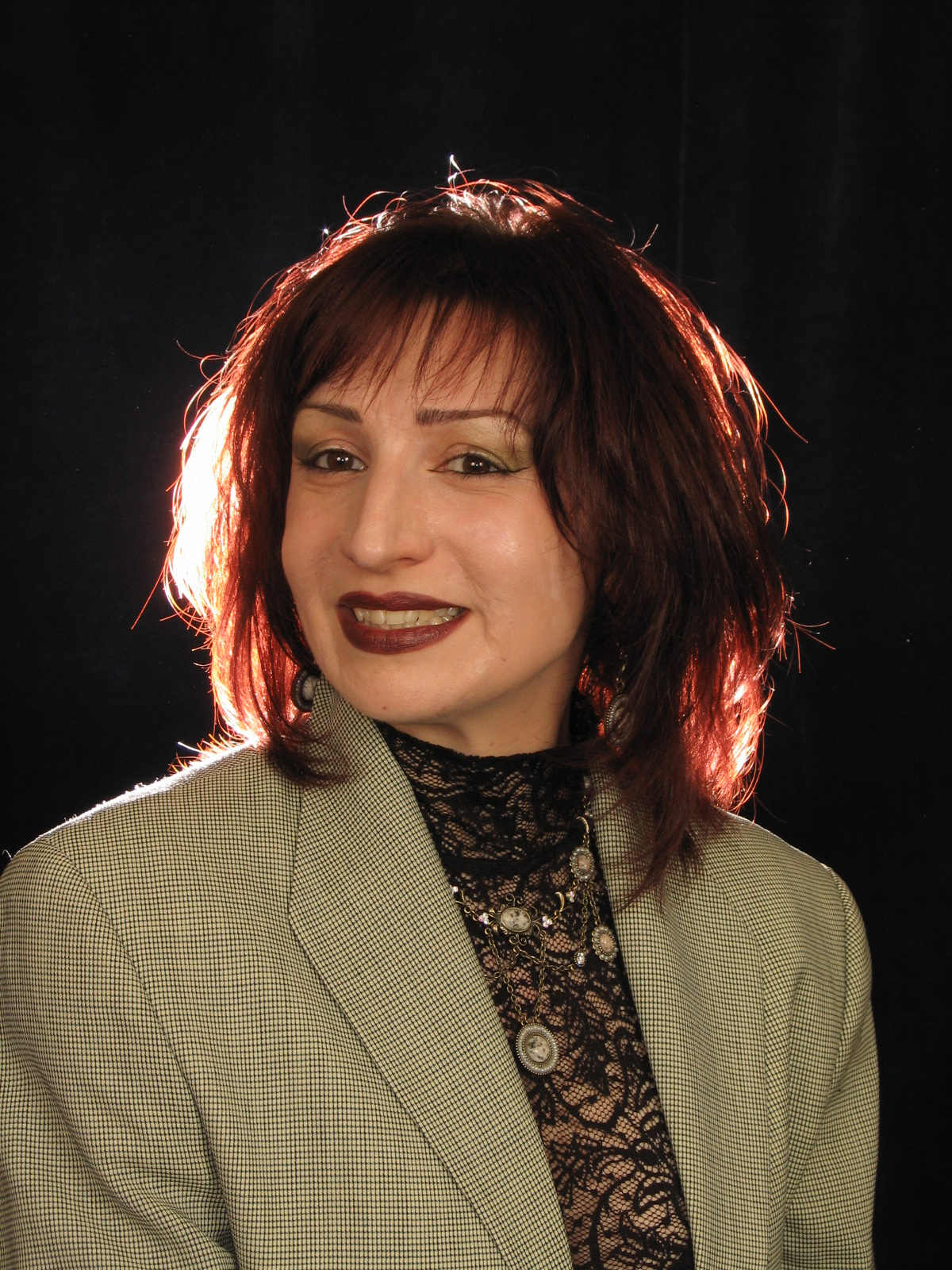
- Laura Pavel in 2008
- Born: October 19, 1968 (age 57); Romania
- Occupations: Essayist and literary critic

Laura Pavel (born 19 October 1968) is a Romanian essayist and literary critic.

== Biography ==
Daughter of Dora Pavel, writer, and Eugen Pavel, linguist, scientific researcher. Married to the literary critic Călin Teutişan. She has a BA in Letters of the "Babeş-Bolyai" University in Cluj-Napoca, the Romanian-English section (1992). PhD in Letters (Literary and Drama Theory), with a thesis dedicated to Eugène Ionesco (2002). She is part of the literary group gathered around the cultural journal Echinox. Research fellowships at the Université Libre de Bruxelles (1993), Indiana University of Bloomington (1997) and the University of Amsterdam (2000). Presently she is professor at the Faculty of Theatre and Television of the "Babeş-Bolyai" University.

== Published works ==
=== Volumes of essays and literary criticism ===
- Antimemoriile lui Grobei. Eseu monografic despre opera lui Nicolae Breban [The Antimemoirs of Grobei. A monographical essay on the oeuvre of Nicolae Breban], Bucharest, Ed. Didactică şi Pedagogică, 1997, 166 p.; the 2nd edition, Bucharest, Ed. Fundaţiei Culturale Ideea Europeană, 2004, 202 p.
- Ionesco. Anti-lumea unui sceptic [Ionesco. The Anti-word of a skeptic], Piteşti, Ed. Paralela 45, 2002, 316 p.
- Ficţiune şi teatralitate [Fiction and Theatricality], Cluj, Ed. Limes, 2003, 176 p.
- Dumitru Țepeneag şi canonul literaturii alternative [Dumitru Ţepeneag and the Canon of Alternative Literature], Cluj, Casa Cărţii de Ştiinţă, 2007, 180 p.
- Dumitru Tsepeneag and the Canon of Alternative Literature, translated by Alistair Ian Blyth, Champaign & Dublin & London, Dalkey Archive Press, 2011, 214 p.
- Teatru și identitate. Interpretări pe scena interioară / Theatre and Identity. Interpretations on the Inner Stage, Cluj, Casa Cărții de Știință, 2012, 230 p.
- Ionesco. L’antimondo di uno scettico, traduzione di Maria Luisa Lombardo, Roma, Aracne editrice, 2016, 316 p. ISBN 978-88-548-9310-8
- Personaje ale teoriei, ființe ale ficțiunii, Iași, Institutul European, 2021, 338 p.

=== Prefaces; edited volumes ===
- Nicolae Breban, Bunavestire, 4th edition, preface, chronology and critical references, Piteşti, Ed. Paralela 45, 2002.
- Sorin Crişan, Jocul nebunilor, preface, Cluj, Ed. Dacia, 2003.
- Dumitru Țepeneag, La belle Roumaine, 2nd edition, preface, Bucharest, Ed. Art, 2007.
- Nicolae Breban, Bunavestire, 5th edition, chronology and critical references, Bucharest, Jurnalul Naţional & Ed. Curtea Veche, 2011.

=== Translations ===
- Melanie Klein, Iubire, vinovăţie, reparaţie [Love, Guilt and Reparation], translation from English, in collaboration, Binghamton & Cluj, Ed. S. Freud, 1994.
- Evelyn Underhill, Mistica [Mysticism], translation from English, Cluj, Ed. "Biblioteca Apostrof", 1995.

=== Collective volumes ===
- Dicţionar analitic de opere literare româneşti [Analytical Dictionary of Romanian Literary Works], edited by Ion Pop, vol. I-IV (1998–2003); final edition, Cluj, Casa Cărţii de Ştiinţă, 2007 (co-author).
- Ionesco după Ionesco / Ionesco après Ionesco, Cluj, Casa Cărţii de Ştiinţă, 2000 (co-author).
- Dumitru Tsepeneag. Les Métamorphoses d'un créateur : écrivain, théoricien, traducteur (Les actes du colloque organisé les 14-15 avril 2006), Timişoara, Editura Universităţii de Vest, 2006 (co-author).
- T(z)ara noastră. Stereotipii şi prejudecăţi, Bucharest, Institutul Cultural Român, 2006 (co-author).
- Poetica dell'immaginario. Imago 2, coordonator Gisèle Vanhese, Arcavacata di Rende (Cosenza), Centro Editoriale e Librario dell'Università della Calabria, 2010 (co-author).
- Multiculturalismo e multilinguismo / Multiculturalisme et multilinguisme, a cura di Gisèle Vanhese, Quaderni del Dipartimento di Linguistica. Università della Calabria, 25, 2010 (co-author).
- Dicţionarul cronologic al romanului românesc. 1990-2000, Bucharest, Editura Academiei Române, 2011 (co-author).
- Dicționarul general al literaturii române, A–B. Ediția a II-a revizuită, adăugită și adusă la zi, București, Editura Muzeul Literaturii Române, 2016 (co-author).
- Dicționarul general al literaturii române, C. Ediția a II-a revizuită, adăugită și adusă la zi, București, Editura Muzeul Literaturii Române, 2016 (co-author).
- Dicționarul cronologic al romanului tradus în România. 1990‒2000, Cluj-Napoca, Institutul de Lingvistică și Istorie Literară „Sextil Pușcariu”, 2017 (co-author).
- Dicționarul general al literaturii române, D–G. Ediția a II-a revizuită, adăugită și adusă la zi, București, Editura Muzeul Literaturii Române, 2017 (co-author).
- Dicționarul general al literaturii române, H–L. Ediția a II-a revizuită, adăugită și adusă la zi, București, Editura Muzeul Literaturii Române, 2017 (co-author).
- Victor Man: Luminary Petals on a Wet, Black Bow , New York, Sternberg Press, 2017 (co-author).
- Dicționarul general al literaturii române, M–O. Ediția a II-a revizuită, adăugită și adusă la zi, București, Editura Muzeul Literaturii Române, 2019 (co-author).
- Enciclopedia imaginariilor din România, coordonator general Corin Braga, vol. V, Imaginar și patrimoniu artistic, volum coordonat de Liviu Malița, Iași, Polirom, 2020 (co-author).

== Affiliations ==
- Member of the Writers Union of Romania
- Member of Conseil International d'Études Francophones (CIEF)
- Member of the Association of General and Comparative Literature of Romania (ALGCR)
- Member in the editorial board of the academic journal Studia Universitatis Babeş-Bolyai, series Dramatica

== Awards ==
- The Prize for Debut at the National Bookfare (1997)
- The Prize "Henri Jacquier" of the French Cultural Center in Cluj (2002)
- The Excellence Award of the "Babeş-Bolyai" University (2002)
- The Prize "Book of the Year - Literary History and Criticism" of the Romanian Writers' Union, Cluj (2007)
