= Lipova, Arad =

Lipova
- Town
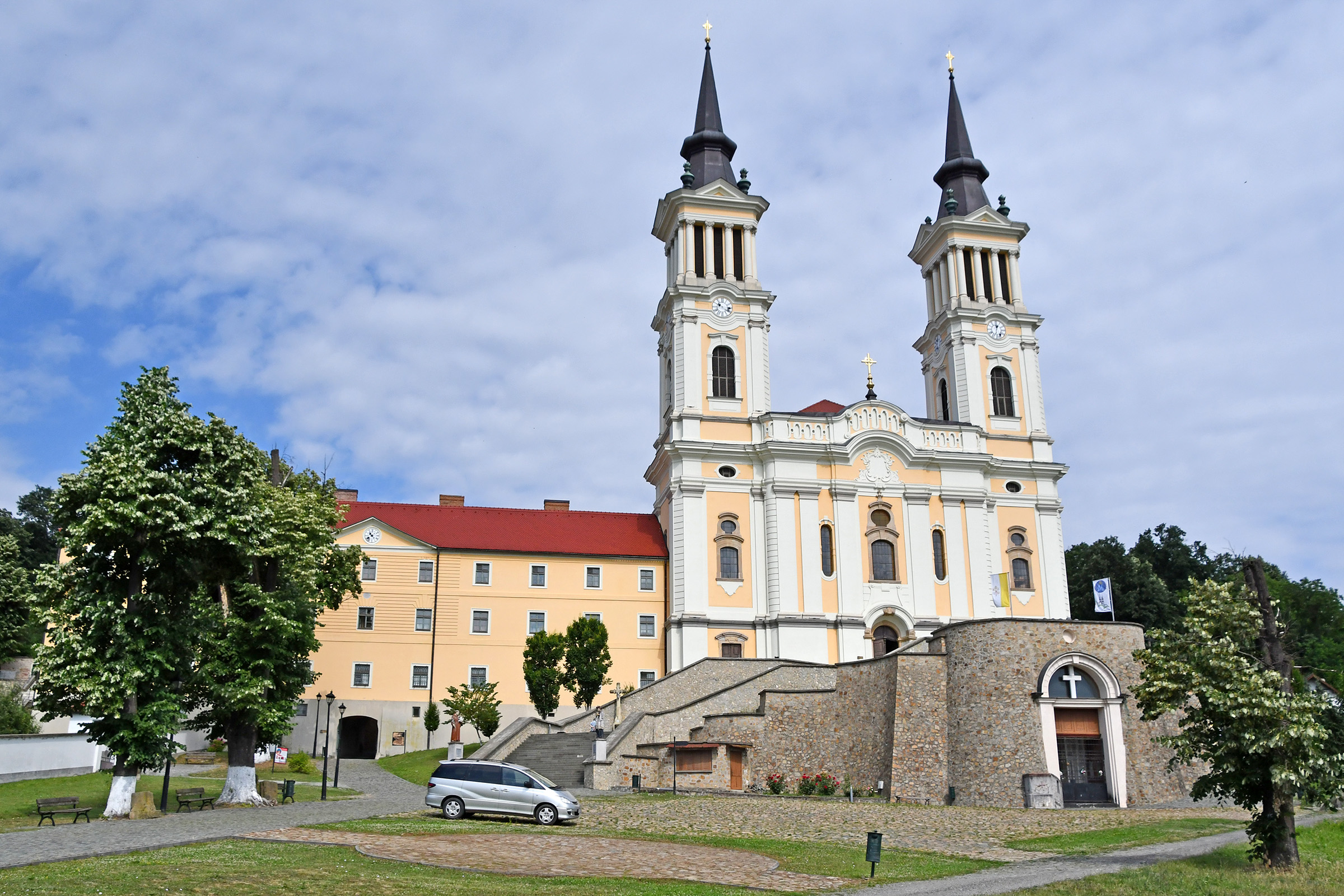
- Maria Radna Monastery

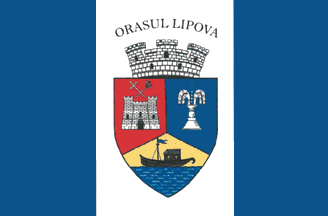
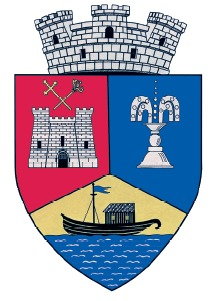
- Flag Coat of arms

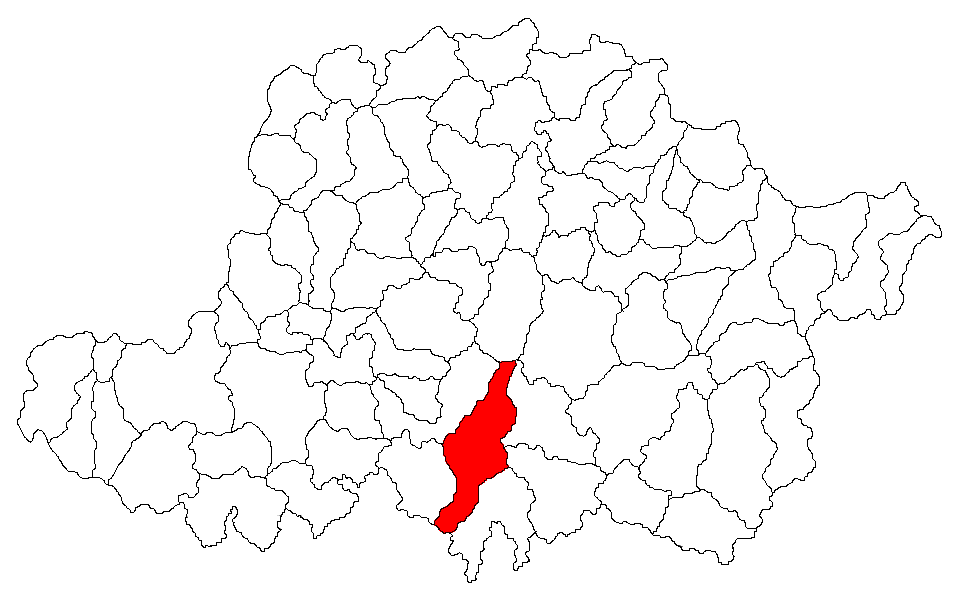
- Location in Arad County

- Location in Romania
- Coordinates: 46°5′30″N 21°41′30″E
- Country: Romania
- County: Arad

Government
  - Mayor (2024–2028): Florin-Fabius Pera (PSD)
- Area: 134.6 km^{2} (52.0 sq mi)
- Elevation: 153 m (502 ft)
- Population (2021-12-01): 10,040
  - Density: 74.59/km^{2} (193.2/sq mi)
- Time zone: UTC+02:00 (EET)
  - Summer (DST): UTC+03:00 (EEST)
- Postal code: 315400
- Area code: (+40) 02 57
- Vehicle reg.: AR
- Website: www.primarialipova.ro

Lipova (Romanian pronunciation: [ˈlipova]; German and Hungarian: Lippa; Serbian: Липова, Lipova; Turkish: Lipva) is a town in Romania, Arad County, located in the Banat region. It is situated at a distance of 34 km (21 mi) from Arad, the county capital, at the contact zone of the river Mureș with the Zarand Mountains, the Western Plateau, and the Lipova Hills. It administers two villages, Radna (Máriaradna) and Șoimoș (Solymosvár), and its total surface is 134.6 km^{2} (52.0 sq mi).

The first written record of the town dates back to 1315 under the name Lipwa. In 1324 the settlement was mentioned as castellanus de Lypua, a place-name that reflects its reinforced character of that time.

== Population ==
Historical population
Year	Pop.	±%
1930	6,000	—
1948	6,556	+9.3%
1956	10,064	+53.5%
1966	11,705	+16.3%
1977	11,863	+1.3%
1992	12,059	+1.7%
2002	11,491	−4.7%
2011	9,648	−16.0%
2021	10,040	+4.1%
Source: Census data

At the 2021 census, Lipova had a population of 10,040. At the 2011 census, the town had 9,648 inhabitants; of those, 94% were Romanians, 2.89% Hungarians, 1.47% Roma, 1.27% Germans, 0.18% Ukrainians, 0.07% Slovaks, and 0.1% of other or undeclared nationalities.

== Etymology ==
Its name is derived from the Slavic word lipa, linden tree, with the -ova suffix.

== History ==
Situated at the crossing of the roads leading to Transylvania, Banat, and Wallachia, Lipova had a history full of vicissitudes. It was situated strategically at the Mureș River's exit from the defile, and consequently it was an extremely enviable centre.

The Castra of Lipova was a Roman fort in the Roman province of Dacia.

After the Tartar invasion in 1241 the fortresses were rebuilt, and the lines of the future urban settlement started to get contoured around the castle. Several names of famous historical personalities are related to this castle, such as John Hunyadi, Matthias Corvinus, György Dózsa, John Zápolya, etc. Due to the continuous disputes, the town has become four times under Turkish administration (between 1552 and 1595, between 1613 and 1686, between 1690-1691 and between 1695 and 1716), and starting with 1716 it came under Habsburg domination. During the first Ottoman rule Lipova became the centre of the Lipova Sanjak. Muslims lived in the centre of the city and were constituted by soldiers or their families residing in the castle and its outskirts. While the countryside and other towns within the sanjak were exclusively Christian. In the 18th-19th centuries Lipova was a well-developed economic centre with famous craftsmen working here. In the period of the revolution in 1848-49 and in the beginning of the 20th century Lipova became an important centre of political and national emancipation, due to the activity of remarkable personalities, such as Nicolae Bălcescu, Vasile Goldiș, Alexandru Mocioni, and Teodor Șerb.

Șoimoș Castle has also taken part from the successive vicissitudinary periods related to the historical events of Lipova and to the defensive role of the main entrance gate from Transylvania.

== Tourist attractions ==
The car industry, light industry, services and tourism are the most representative economic sectors. The tourist sites of the town include both natural and anthropic elements. Due to the abundance of tourist attractions, Lipova is an important tourism centre. The natural reservation "Balta Șoimoș", the Șoimoș Castle, the monastery called "Saint Mary" in Radna, the Church of the Annunciation and the Church of the Assumption of Virgin Mary in Lipova, the town museum, the "Sub dughene" bazaar (Turkish bazaar), the environs of the town-hall (Nicolae Bălcescu Street) and the thermal bath where springs with curative mineral water flow.

== Natives ==
- Carmen-Francesca Banciu (born 1955), novelist
- Alajos Degré (1819–1896), lawyer
- Atanasie Marian Marienescu (1830–1915), folklorist and judge
- Jovan Nenad (1492–1527), self-declared Emperor of Serbia
- Pahomije Tenecki (17th century), painter
- Stefan Tenecki (1720–1798), icon painter
- Tinu Veresezan, singer
- Ion Vincze (1910–1996), communist activist
