= Dan Apostol =

Romanian writer and researcher

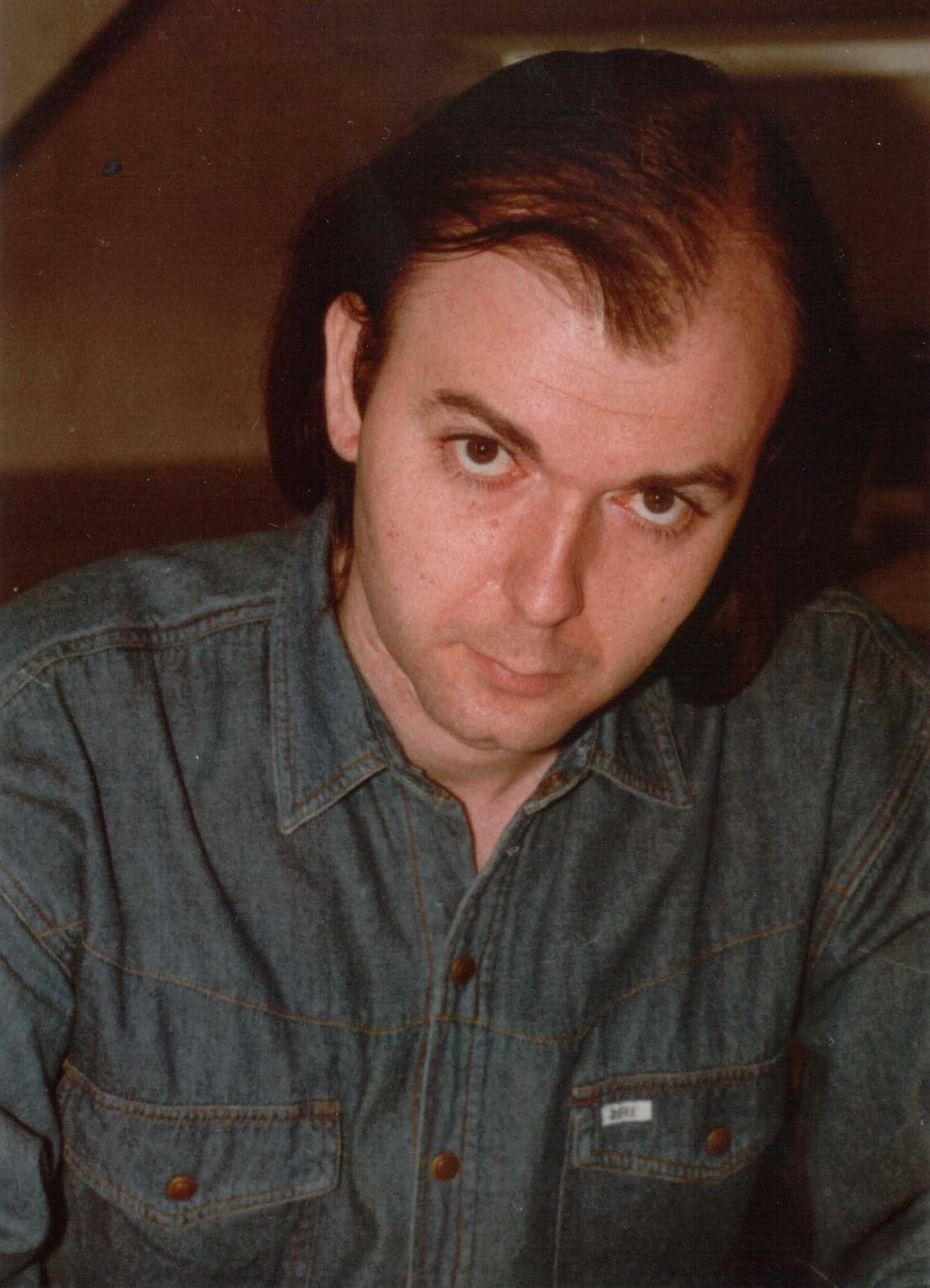
- Born: July 12, 1957; Bucharest, Romanian People's Republic
- Died: March 4, 2013 (aged 55); Bucharest, Romania
- Occupation(s): Writer and researcher

Dan Apostol (12 July 1957, Bucharest – 4 March 2013, Bucharest) was a Romanian writer and researcher, specialized in several aspects of aviation, history, archeology, ancient civilisations, art, biology, anthropology, paleontology, and cryptozoology.

== Books ==
- Enigmas... for now, 1984, 1986 (second edition), 2018 (third edition).
- Flight 19, 1985, 2020
- Mysteries of the Earth, 1987
- The Unknown Nature, 1989
- Footprints into the Cosmos, 1989
- Ancient Civilizations on Earth, 1990
- Lords of the Depths, 1991
- From a Lost World, 1993
- Explorers of the Infinite, 1997
- Atlantida and Pacifida - Ancient Protocivilizations, 1998, 2003 (second edition)
- World of the Dragons, 2000
- Chronicles from Outer Worlds, 2001
- Monsters of the Depths, 2003
- Pacifida - The Missing Continent, 2003
- Survivors of the Cuaternar, 2003
- Aliens in our Prehistory, 2003, 2014
- Unexplained Disappearances during the Great Wars, 2003, 2005, 2020
- Atlantis - The Lost Empire, 2004
- The Mystery of the Golden Cities, 2004
- The Fall of the Angel, 2004 (fiction)
- The War of the Worlds, 2005, 2014
- Dinosaurs - a Reality in the History of the Last Millennia, 2005
- Unexplained Aerial Phenomena - An Updated History from the Secret Files, 2005, 2014
- Women-warriors in the Battles that Changed the World, 2005
- The Cities of the Giant Octopus, 2006, 2014
- The warriors from Beyond, 2014, 2023
- Atlantis and other lost worlds, 2015, 2020
- Forgotten heroes, 2015
- The Hunters of the Other World, 2015 (fiction)
- Dinosauria, 2018
- Mysterious Disappearances, 2020
- UFO - Hidden Truths, 2021
- UFO - Danger!, 2021

== Anthologies ==
- Coauthor of the Antares anthologies with Rodica Bretin, 4 volumes (1991–1995) about ancient civilisations, unexplained phenomena, cryptozoology, and fantastic literature.

== International awards ==
- The Award for Short Prose at the Fantasia Festival (Copenhague, Denmark), 1998 for the story Hunters from Beyond
- The Great Award for the best Foreign Prose, of the Fantasia Art Association (Cornwall, Great Britain), 2004, for the story The Fall of the Angel

== Editorialist ==
- Between 1982 and 2010, Apostol published 800 articles, studies and editorials in 25 Romanian, French, Italian, and British publications (including Sciences et Avenir, Science et Vie, Nature, Natural History, The Historian, Magazin, Astra, România Literară, Știință și Tehnică, Meridian, Baricada, SLAST, Magazin Internațional, Terra XXI, Jurnalul de București, START 2001) and 6 anthologies from England and Romania.

== Audiovisual work ==
- Chief Programs Officer (1993) and Executive Manager (1994–1996) at the Canal b National Company of Film, Television and Video
- In 1993 has directed two television documentaries: Stalin – A Nightmare for Eternity and Baia Mare – in Search of the Hidden Cancer
- Between 1994 and 1996, he was the producer of all television programs distributed nationwide by the Canal b National Company of Film, Television, and Video
- Between 1982 and 2010, he was the producer, host, or guest of 300 TV and Radio shows at 16 Romanian, French, Italian, and British Television and Radio Channels (Arte, Rai Due, ZDF, RTL, Discovery, Discovery Civilisation, BBC, TVR 1, TVR 2, TV Sigma, Tele 7 abc, Radio Romania 1 and 2, Radio Bucharest, Radio Total, and Radio Tinerama)
