= Leonard Oprea =

Romanian novelist and poet

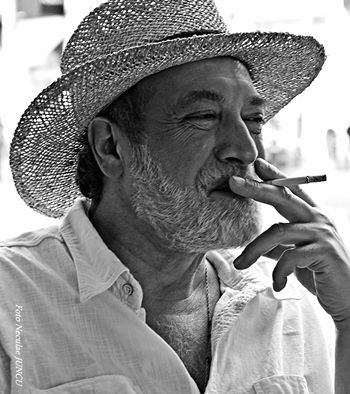
- Born: December 16, 1953 (age 72); Prejmer, Stalin Region, People's Republic of Romania
- Education: Transilvania University of Brașov; California State University, Chico
- Occupations: novelist, poet, essayist

Leonard Oprea (Romanian pronunciation: [le.oˈnard ˈopre̯a]; born December 16, 1953) is a Romanian novelist, poet, and essayist. In the late 1980s, he wrote two books of fiction that were banned by the Communist regime and gained him repute among dissidents. Following the 1989 Revolution, the books were published but did not attract significant notice during the political upheaval of the time. He left Romania for the United States in 1999, after which the pair of previously banned works was once again released. In the 2000s, he wrote the fictional series Theophil Magus, and by 2020 this series included 17 separate titles.

== Biography ==
=== Origins and early career ===
Born in Prejmer, Brașov County, Oprea attended Andrei Șaguna High School in Brașov before undertaking his studies at the Transilvania University of Brașov. He also holds a specialization in mass media from California State University, Chico, obtained in 1990. Prior to the Romanian Revolution of 1989, Oprea wrote Domenii Interzise, published in 1984, a collection of fantasy short stories and novellas. Following publication, he penned a lengthy analysis of the works of Nicolae Steinhardt in the Iași magazine Opinia studențească, which led to a ban on writing by the Communist regime, in particular its Securitate secret police. He also wrote the short prose collection Radiografia clipei ("The X-ray of an Instant") and the novel Cămașa de forță ("The Straitjacket"), as well as publishing several short stories in cultural magazines, and won a number of national literary prizes. His two full-length works were banned by the regime and circulated in samizdat form. Due to this censorship, critic Tudorel Urian says that in the 1980s his name was much better known in dissident circles than his work. Oprea was a participant in the Brașov Rebellion of 1987.

=== Since 1989 ===
Radiografia clipei, which was banned in 1987, was published in 1990, subsequent to the fall of the regime, and Cămașa de forță in 1992, but according to Urian, both went nearly unnoticed. The latter states that in that period, forthright expression had come into fashion, and stories told in parables, such as Oprea's, were no longer favored. In 1999, Oprea emigrated to the United States, following which his novels began to meet with greater success in his native country. Trilogia lui Theophil Magus ("The Trilogy of Theophil Magus") appeared between 2000 and 2002, followed by new editions of Radiografia clipei (2003 and 2016) and Cămașa de forță (2004). Extensive appreciations were published by cultural commentators such as Mircea Mihăieș, Vladimir Tismăneanu, Sorin Antohi, Liviu Antonesei, Norman Manea, which, Urian states, helped secure Oprea's reputation in contemporary Romanian literature. A fourth volume in the planned trilogy appeared in 2007, turning it into a tetralogy.

Urian labels Oprea a "true dissident" in the manner of Corneliu Coposu and Adam Michnik, having directly confronted the regime, undergone abusive interrogations by the Securitate secret police, and not called for vindictive retribution against former regime figures after 1989. Radiografia clipei, which brings together several short works, deals with alienated intellectuals who are either artists or dreamers. They have been deemed enemies of their society due to their power to escape into their own worlds. They face concerted political and social pressure, and their attempts at resistance are meager, tending to be supplanted by despair and isolation.

In 1992, Oprea established the Vladimir Colin Cultural Foundation and associated awards, while in 1995, he opened Athena Publishing House in Bucharest.

=== After 2000 ===
Leonard Oprea continued his literary activity mainly by extending the Theophil Magus series, which by 2021 included 18 novels. These include literary innovations, such as the "breathings" and the haiku novel, which have received critical praise. In 2022 he publishes the novel “EPHAPHATHA sau Asasinul unui președinte?(EPHAPHATHA or, The Assassin of a President?)” considered by the literary critic Marian Odangiu to be "one of the best sociopolitical and historical novels of the last 30 years.",. In November 2023 the latter book received the "Special Prize of the Committee for Prose" from the "Timișoara Writers Association".

== Publications ==
- Domenii interzise ("Forbidden Areas"), Editura Albatros, Bucharest, 1984.
- Radiografia clipei ("The X-ray of an Instant"), Editura Dacia, Cluj-Napoca, 1990; Second edition: Editura Curtea Veche, Bucharest, 2003; Third edition: Editura Tracus Arte, Bucharest, 2016.
- Cămașa de forță ("The Straitjacket"), Editura Nemira, Bucharest, 1992; Second edition: Editura Curtea Veche, 2004; Third edition: Editura Eikon, Bucharest, 2016.
- Trilogia lui Theophil Magus ("The Theophil Magus Trilogy")
  - Cele Nouă Învățături ale lui Theophil Magus despre Magia Transilvană ("The Nine Teachings of Theophil Magus on Transylvanian Magic"), Editura Polirom, Bucharest, 2000.
  - Cartea lui Theophil Magus sau 40 de povești despre om ("The Book of Theophil Magus or 40 Tales about Man"), Editura Polirom, 2001.
  - Meditaţiile lui Theophil Magus sau Simple Cugetări Creștine la Început de Mileniu III ("The Meditations of Theophil Magus or Simple Christian Thoughts at the Beginning of the Third Millennium"), Editura Polirom, 2002.
- Theophil Magus - Confesiuni 2004-2006 ("Theophil Magus - Confessions 2004-2006"), Editura Universal Dalsi, Bucharest, 2007.
- The Book of Theophil Magus or 40 Tales About Man, AuthorHouse, 2003.
- Theophil Magus in Baton Rouge: A Haiku Novel, Xlibris, 2008.
- Trilogy of Theophil Magus - The Truth, Xlibris, 2008.
- Theophil Magus Living in Boston - Anna-Maria 101 Breathings, Xlibris, 2011.
- The Daily Agony of Theophil Magus: Jazz & Blues Haiku Novel for Anna-Maria, Xlibris, 2012.
- Theophil Magus in America – 1001 Respirații ("Theophil Magus in America – 1001 Breathings"), Editura Kron-Art, Brașov, 2013.
- Hello God ("Trilogy of Theophil Magus - The Life", Volume III), Xlibris, 2013.
- Noi Domenii Interzise and Domenii Interzise ("New Forbidden Areas" and "Forbidden Areas"), Editura Tracus Arte, Bucharest, 2015.
- Trilogia lui Theophil Magus (The trilogy of Theophil Magus), illustrated edition, updated and revised, Editura Eikon, Bucharest, 2015
- Lehamitea lui Theophil Magus (The Very-Spleen of Theophil Magus), Eikon Publishing House, Bucharest, 2016
- Theophil Magus—Moarte şi Viață (Theophil Magus--Death and Life), Eikon Publishing House, Bucharest, 2017
- Trezirea Șoimului Theophil Magus (The Hawk Awakening Theophil Magus), Eikon Publishing House, Bucharest, 2019
- Metafizica Simplității lui Theophil Magus (Theophil Magus's Metaphysics of Simplicity), Eikon Publishing House, Bucharest, 2021
- EPHPHATHA sau, Asasinul unui președinte? (EPHPHATHA or, the Assassin of a president?), Eikon Publishing House, Bucharest, 2022
- Domenii interzise ("Forbidden Areas"), Commemorative edition (With foreword by Nicolae Steinhardt), Eikon Publishing House, Bucharest, 2024
