= Elena Djionat =

Elena Djionat (1888-fl. 1936), was a Romanian educator, journalist, suffragist and women's rights activist. She was co-founder and leader of the Organizatja Reuniunii Femeilor Basaribene (Organization of Bessarabian Women) in 1928-1935.

== Life ==
Djionat was born in the Russian Empire and educated at the University of Odessa before becoming a teacher at the Princess Elena Primary School in Chisnau, and principal there in 1919-1935. She became involved in feminist work in 1907, but focused more on unification with Romania until Bessarabia became a part of Romania in 1919, after which she engaged in women's rights issue in response to the neglect of Romania to give women the right to vote. The women's rights movement was split in the 1930s between her and Elena Amistar. Nothing about her is known after 1936.
