= Rodica Bretin =

Romanian writer

Rodica Bretin (born 6 November 1958) is a Romanian writer specialized in history and fantastic literature.

Rodica Bretin was born in Brașov and since 1982 lives in Bucharest. A renowned writer in Romania and Eastern Europe, she has been a member of the Romanian Writers Union (USR) since 1991 and Fantasia Art Association (Cornwall, England) since 1996. She is also a scientific researcher, specialised in history, having participated at historical and archaeological campaigns in: Transylvania, Romania (1996), Languedoc, France (1998) and Milan, Italy (2002).

== Works ==
=== Fiction books ===
- Holographic Effect (Effect Holografic) (Albatros Publishing House, 1985)
- The White Hawk (Șoimul Alb) (Facla Publishing House, 1987)
- The Giant (Uriașul cel Bun) (Ion Creangă Publishing House, 1989)
- Neverending Road (Drumul fără Sfârșit) (Baricada Publishing House, 1991)
- The One who Comes from the Shadow (Cel care vine din Urmă) (Baricada Publishing House, 1993)
- World of Hind (Lumea lui Hind) (Coresi Publishing House, 1998)
- The Sandman (Omul de Nisip) (Image Publishing House, 2000)
- Iron Maiden (Fecioara de Fier) (Coresi Publishing House, 2002; second edition, Pocket Book Publishing House, 2006; third edition Eagle Publishing House, 2015; fourth edition Tritonic Publishing House, 2017)
- The City Without Past (Cetatea fără trecut) (Nemira Publishing House, 2015)
- The Fortress (Fortăreața) (Tritonic Publishing House, 2016)
- Men and Gods, volume 1 of The Protectors trilogy (Oameni şi Zei, volumul 1 din trilogia Protectorii) (Tritonic Publishing House, 2017)
- The Stargate, volume 2 of The Protectors trilogy (Poarta Stelară, volumul 2 din trilogia Protectorii) (Tritonic Publishing House, 2018)
- Elysium, volume 3 of The Protectors trilogy (Elysium, volumul 3 din trilogia Protectorii) (Tritonic Publishing House, 2019)
- The House Without Books (Casa fără cărți) (Pavcon Publishing House, 2020)
- The Twilight of the Chosen People (Amurgul elkilor) (Creator Publishing House, 2021)
- Tigers Dream in Colors (Tigrii visează în culori) (Art and Literature Publishing House, 2024)
- The Protectors (Protectorii) (Art and Literature Publishing House, 2025)
- The Five O'Clock Cat (Pisica de la ora cinci) (Corinth Editorial Group, 2026)

=== History books ===
- Files of the Impossible (Dosarele Imposibilului) (Pocket Book, 2003)
- The Time Tunnel (Tunelul Timpului) (Pocket Book, 2003)
- The Witches' Gate (Poarta Vrăjitoarelor) (Pocket Book, 2004, Nemira Publishing House 2015)
- Poltergeist: The Invisible Foes (Poltergeist: atacatori invizibili) (Pocket Book, 2005)
- The Mystery of Parallel Worlds (Misterul Lumilor Paralele) (Pocket Book, 2006)
- Lost in Time (Naufragiați în Timp) (Pocket Book, 2006)
- Voyages in Time and Parallel Worlds (Călătorii în timp și Lumi paralele) (Nemira Publishing House, 2015)
- Chronicles of the Impossible (Cronicile Imposibilului) (ePublishers, 2015)
- The Vikings - Warrior of the Nord (Războinicii Nordului) (ePublishers, 2015)
- Echoes from Beyond (Ecouri din tenebre) (Crux Publishing House, 2016; Creator Publishing House, 2022)
- The Last Frontier (Ultima Frontieră) (Pavcon Publishing House, 2021)
- The Vikings (Vikingii) (Creator Publishing House, 2023)

== Anthologist ==
Anthologist and translator of the mainstream/fantastic literature anthologies:

- Chronicles from the Forbidden Worlds (2003)
- Hunters of the Other World (2006)
- Co-anthologist at the Antares anthologies with Dan Apostol, 4 volumes (1991–1995), about ancient civilisations, unexplained phenomena, and fantastic literature.

== Translation works ==
- Dale Cooper, by S. Frost, 1993
- Lady Chatterley's Lover, by D. H. Lawrence, 1993
- La Feline Geante, by J.-H. Rosny aîné, 1993
- Dans le Ombre de la Guillotine, by O. LeBaron, 1994

== Literary awards ==
- Award for the Best Foreign Story for the story The Darkness, at the International Festival of Fantastic Art (Annecy, France, 1996)
- Volaverunt Award for the story The Conquistador, at the Festival of Valencia (Spain, 2001)
- The Best Foreign Novel awarded by Fantasia Art Association (Cornwall, Great Britain, 2005) for the historical novel The Iron Maiden
- The COLIN Award, at the 7th edition, 2017, for The City Without Past, a short story book.
- The OPERA OMNIA Award, at the 40th edition of the National Science Fiction and Fantasy Convention, Romania, 2019.
- Honorable Mention, 2021, for the story Requiem for a Revolver at the Writers of the Future contest.
- The Novelette Award, at the 43rd National Science-fiction and Fantasy Convention, 2022, for the story Twilight of the Chosen Ones from the volume with the same title.
- The Prose Prize, awarded in 2022 by the Association Buna Vestire and the Brasov branch of the writers' union for the volume Twilight of the Chosen Ones, Creator Publishing House, Brasov, 2021.
- The Fiction Award, 2023, for the story the Eight Death published in The Fiction Magazine in 2022.
- Honorable Mention, 2023, for the story The American Dream at the Writers of the Future contest.
- The Prize of the LIBRIS Literary Magazine for Prose, in 2023.

== See also ==
- List of Romanian writers

== Sources ==
- John Clute, Peter Nicholls:The Encyclopedia of Science Fiction, Orbit, London, 1993
- Nemira's Dictionary of Fantasy&Science-Fiction Romanian Writers, Nemira, Bucharest, 1999
- CDB's Catalogue of Authors, Pocket Book Publishing House, Bucharest, 2006
- Jean-Pierre Moumon: Antares Anthologies, La Valette, France, 1987 and 2008
- The Historian, Truro, Cornwall, Great Britain, 2006
- Writers' Union of Romania
- Today's Romanian Writers, Gates of the Orient Publishing House, Iasi, 2011
- Contemporary Romanian Writers, Arial Publishing House, Ploiești, Romania, 2013
- Personalities from contemporary Romanian Women, Meronia Publishing House, Bucharest, 2013
- Encyclopedia of Contemporary Romanian Writers from all over the World, Phoenix Publishing House, Chișinău, Moldova, 2020
