= Constantin Chiriță =

Romanian writer

Constantin Chiriță (March 12, 1925 – November 14, 1991) was a Romanian writer.

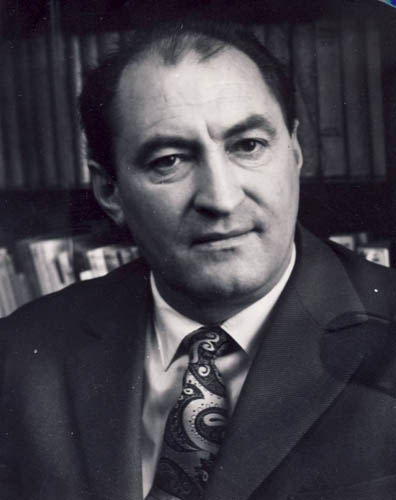
Constantin Chiriță

He was born in 1925 in Ibănești, Vaslui County, Romania. He attended the Gheorghe Roșca Codreanu High School in Bârlad, and finished his high school studies in Bucharest. He then attended the Politehnica University of Bucharest, but did not complete his degree. Instead, he started working for Scînteia, the official newspaper of the Romanian Communist Party.

His work includes mainly writings for the young public, and still is popular today among adolescents in Romania. His best known work is a five-volume cycle entitled Cireșarii first published in 1956 and tells the adventures of a group of youths. It was adapted into a television series during the 1970s.

Chiriță died in 1991 in Königswinter, Germany.
