= Petre Luscalov =

Romanian author (1927–2004)

Petre Luscalov (15 April 1927 – 15 January 2004) was a Romanian writer of children books. Some of his novels, such as Nufărul roșu, Ostrovul Lupilor, and Fiul munților were made into films. The book Ostrovul Lupilor became a bestseller of Romanian children’s literature.

Luscalov was born in Chișinău on 15 April 1927 and died in Bucharest on 15 January 2004, aged 76.

In the article Despre unele probleme ale eroului pozitiv (On some aspects of the positive character), published in Contemporanul in 1954, Luscalov argued that the positive character was missing from Romanian literature due to writers having a faulty idea about what it represents.

== Selected bibliography ==
- Luscalov, Petre (1950). Nufărul roșu. București: Editura Tineretului. OCLC 1407782618.
- Luscalov, Petre; Voinescu, Romeo (1963). Tăurașul. București: Editura Tineretului. OCLC 254685340.
- Luscalov, Petre; Darie, Iura (1961). Puiul de rață sălbatică. București: Editura Tineretului. OCLC 254590638.
- Luscalov, Petre (1969). Ostrovul Lupilor. București: Editura Tineretului.
- Luscalov, Petre (1974). Iubire interzisă. București: Editura Militară. LCCN 75529898. OCLC 40156287.
- Luscalov, Petre (1979). Fiul munților. București: Editura Ion Creangă. LCCN 80451895. OCLC 6091762.
- Luscalov, Petre; Marinescu, Dana (1981). Pasărea măiastră. București: Editura Ion Creangă. OCLC 893761635.

== Filmography ==
- 1981 Fiul munților
- 1976 Alarmă în Deltă
- 1973 Aventurile lui Babușcă (novel 'Ostrovul Lupilor')/(screenplay)
- 1964 Pisica de mare (writer)
- 1957 Erupția (writer)
