= Carmen-Francesca Banciu =

Romanian novelist and lecturer

Carmen-Francesca Banciu (born October 25, 1955) is a Romanian novelist and lecturer.

== Biography ==
Born in Lipova, Arad County, she was the daughter of a high-ranking Romanian Communist Party and government official. Banciu studied church mural painting and foreign trade at schools in Bucharest.

In 1985, she won the International Short Story Prize of the city of Arnsberg, Germany, an achievement which prompted a publication ban in Romania. In 1990, after the fall of the communist regime in Romania (the Romanian Revolution of 1989), Banciu moved to Berlin, and since 1996, she has not only written in Romanian, but also in German. In addition to writing, she works as a freelance editor and commentator for various news media and regularly teaches seminars on creative writing.

In 2005, Banciu was writer-in-residence at Rutgers University in New Brunswick, New Jersey.

== Works ==
- Manual de Întrebări ("Manual of Questions"), 1984
- Fenster in Flammen ("Windows in Flames", 1992
- Filuteks Handbuch der Fragen ("Filutek's Manual of Questions"), 1995
- Vaterflucht ("Flight from Father"), 1998
- Ein Land voller Helden ("A Land Full of Heroes"), 2000
- Berlin ist mein Paris ("Berlin Is My Paris"), 2002
- Deborah (radioplay), 2005
- Das Lied der traurigen Mutter, ("The song of the sad mother"), 2007

== Awards ==
- Arnsberg International Short Story Prize (1985) for Das strahlende Ghetto (trans. "The Beaming Ghetto")
- Luceafărul Literature Prize
