= Dora Pavel =

Romanian writer and journalist

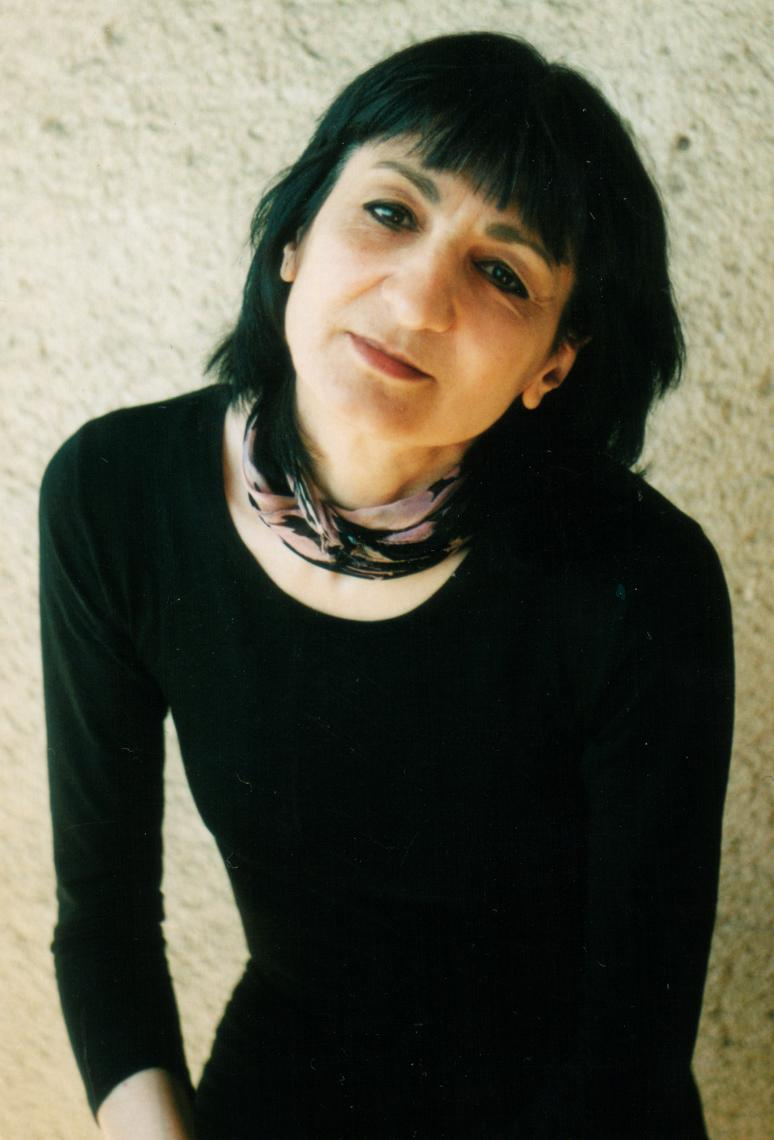
- Pavel in 2008
- Born: June 29, 1946 (age 80); Deva
- Occupations: novelist, short story writer, poet, journalist
- Writing career
- Period: since 1972

Dora Pavel (born June 29, 1946) is a Romanian novelist, short-story writer, poet, and journalist.

== Biography ==
Born as Dora Voicu to Viorica Pop and Eugen Voicu, both teachers, Dora Pavel graduated from the Decebal College in Deva (1964), and the Faculty of Letters of the Babeş-Bolyai University in Cluj (1969).

She graduated Decebal College in Deva (1964), and the Faculty of Letters of the Babeş-Bolyai University in Cluj (1969). She became professor of Romanian language in Alba Iulia and Deva, then researcher at the Institute of Linguistics and Literary History in Cluj; since 1990, she has worked as editor at the local Radio Station of Cluj, where she specialises in topics of Romanian language and literature.

She made her poetry debut in the literary magazine Steaua (1972), and her editorial debut in the collective volume Alpha '84 (1984) at Dacia Publishing House. She also publishes poetry and prose in such literary magazines as Tribuna, Steaua, Contrapunct, Apostrof, Contemporanul-Ideea Europeană, România literară, Viaţa românească, Poesis, Familia and Vatra.

== Works ==
=== Poetry ===
- Naraţiuni întâmplătoare (Casual Narratives), Cluj, Ed. Dacia, 1989.
- Poemul deshumat (The Exhumed Poem), Cluj, Ed. Dacia, 1994.
- Creier intermediar (Intermediary Brains), Oradea, Ed. Cogito, 1997.
- Muncile lui Don Quijote (The Labours of Don Quixote, an anthology), Piteşti, Ed. Paralela 45, 2000.

=== Short stories ===
- Întoarce-te, Esthera (Come Back, Esthera), Cluj, Ed. "Biblioteca Apostrof", 1999.
- Animal în alertă, Cluj, Ed. Dacia XXI, 2010

=== Novels ===
- Agata murind (Dying Agata), Cluj, Ed. Dacia, 2003; 2nd ed., Iaşi, Ed. Polirom, 2004; 3rd ed., Iaşi, Ed. Polirom, 2014.
- Captivul (The Captive), Iaşi, Ed. Polirom, 2006; 2nd ed., Iaşi, Ed. Polirom, 2017.
- Pudră (Powder), Iaşi, Ed. Polirom, 2010.
- Do Not Cross, Iași, Ed. Polirom, 2013.
- Agata muriendo, translated by Marian Ochoa de Eribe, Madrid, Editorial Crealite, 2013.
- No pasar (Do Not Cross), translated by Doina Făgădaru, Madrid, Dos Bigotes, 2018.
- Bastian, Iași, Ed. Polirom, 2020.
- Crush, Iași, Ed. Polirom, 2022.
- Efectul Caligari, Iași, Ed. Polirom, 2025.

=== Interviews ===
- Armele seducţiei (Weapons of Seduction; Dialogues), Cluj, Casa Cărţii de Ştiinţă, 2007.
- Rege şi ocnaş (King and Prisoner), Cluj, Casa Cărţii de Ştiinţă, 2008.
- Gheorghe Grigurcu, O provocare adresată destinului. Convorbiri cu Dora Pavel, Satu Mare, Pleiade, 2009.

=== Anthologies ===
- Young Poets of a New Romania, London & Boston, Forest Books, 1991.
- Transylvanian Voices. An Anthology of Contemporary Poets of Cluj-Napoca, Iaşi, The Center for Romanian Studies, 1997.
- Vid Tystnadens Bord, Stockholm, Symposion, 1998.
- Poètes roumains contemporains, Ottawa, Écrits des Forges, 2000.
- Il romanzo rumeno contemporaneo (1989-2010). Teorie e proposte di lettura, a cura di Nicoleta Nesu, edizione italiana di Angela Tarantino, premessa di Luisa Valmarin, Bagatto Libri, Roma, 2010.
- Fiction 16: Contemporary Romanian Prose, Iaşi, Ed. Polirom, 2010.

=== Editions ===
- Biblia de la Blaj (1795) (The Bible of Blaj), Rome (in collaboration with Tipografia Vaticana), 2000

== Affiliations ==
- Member of The Writers' Union of Romania
- Member of The Professional Journalists' Union of Romania

== Awards ==
- Romanian Academy's Award, Timotei Cipariu (2000)
- Romanian Writers' Union Award for fiction (2003)
- The I. D. Sârbu Award of The Writers' Union, Cluj (2006)
- The Pavel Dan Award of The Writers' Union, Cluj (2007, 2010)
- The Best Book of the Year – Literary Journalism Award of The Writers' Union, Cluj (2007)
- The Ion Agârbiceanu Award of The Writers' Union, Cluj (2013)

== Sources ==
- (in Romanian) Dying Agata: Review by Marius Chivu, in România literară, no. 7, February 23 – March 1, 2005
- (in Romanian) Interview by Oana Cristea Grigorescu, in Observator cultural, no. 67, Juny 14, 2006
- (in Romanian) The Captive: Review by Andrei Simuţ, in Observator cultural, no. 102, February 15-21, 2007
- (in Romanian) Weapons of Seduction: Review by Gheorghe Grigurcu, in România literară, no. 2, January 11-17, 2008
- (in Italian) Powder: Review by Irina Turcanu, in Sul Romanzo, November 10, 2010
- (in Romanian) Do Not Cross: Review by Cosmin Ciotloș, in România literară, no. 33, 2013
- (in Romanian) Do Not Cross: Review by Alex Goldiș, in România literară, no. 39, 2013
- (in Italian) Do Not Cross: Review by Mauro Barindi, in Orizzonti culturali italo-romeni / Orizonturi culturale italo-române, nr. 11, November 2013
- (in French) Giovanni Magliocco, L'errance post-mortem d'une identité fragmentée. "Pudrã" de Dora Pavel entre Néo-Gothique et Postmoderne, in L'errance post-mortem d'une identité fragmentée. "Pudrã" de Dora Pavel entre Néo-Gothique et Postmoderne, in Caietele Echinox, vol. 35, 2018, p. 366‒398
