= National Theater Craiova =

Cultural institution in Craiova, Romania

- Teatrul Național Marin Sorescu din Craiova
- Postcard of the TNC, c. 1975
- Interactive map of National Theater Craiova
- Address: Strada Alexandru Ioan Cuza 11; Craiova; Romania
- Coordinates: 44°19′10″N 23°47′59″E
- Owner: Dolj County; Romanian Ministry of Culture
- Capacity: 700 (main hall)
- Type: State-funded

Construction
- Opened: 1850; 176 years ago
- Years active: 1850–1856; 1856–1907; 1907–1927; 1927–1935; 1942–1973; (at various locations); 1973–present (at current location)

Website
- tncms.ro

The National Theater Craiova, formally named after playwright Marin Sorescu (Romanian: Teatrul Național Marin Sorescu din Craiova, TNC), is a state-run institution for performing arts in Craiova, Romania. It endures as the center of theatrical life in all of Oltenia, and overall as one of that region's most celebrated cultural institutions. Its origins lead back to a private company set up in 1850—though a permanent local troupe was only established in the 1860s, when managed by Theodor Theodorini and his wife Maria; sponsored and rebuilt by their famous daughter Elena, by 1880 it was already embroiled in political intrigue, and ignored by the affluent elites. It became a fully state-owned theater in 1889, under the Romanian dynastic regime. This change turned allegations of maladministration into issues of national interest, especially during 1898, when Ion Livescu led an actors' revolt against the state-appointed managers. The modernization effort begun by Livescu and Petre I. Sturdza, who changed focus away from crowd-pleasing operettas and melodramas, was carried forward by manager Emil Gârleanu, initially with help from Liviu Rebreanu. In the early 1910s, Gârleanu's TNC came to promote Romanian nationalism and historicism alongside the staples of modern drama, while also completing one of the earliest projects in Romanian cinema.

Virtually closed down during World War I, the TNC fared poorly in interwar Greater Romania. Its building burned down in 1927, with shows being performed at Carol I High School, or in cinema halls; actors were driven into poverty by the Great Depression, and the management team changed constantly. TNC programs continued to be shaped by the aesthetic preferences of average consumers, but it occasionally welcomed non-traditional stage directors, and sometimes embraced avant-garde drama. The institution broke down completely in 1934, when the actors staged a revolt against troupe manager A. de Herz; the TNC was closed down in 1935, and was only reopened in 1942, by which time Romania was under Ion Antonescu's Nazi-aligned dictatorship. Pushes for a fascization of the repertory lasted until Antonescu's toppling in 1944, after which the TNC embraced generic leftism, eventually narrowed down to socialist realism.

During the early stages of the communization era, the TNC was regarded, by both government officials and their critics, as a mediocre enterprise. A creative burst occurred in the mid-to-late 1950s, when Vlad Mugur was called in to direct; the program became more classical in nature, and national-themed plays were also showcased (including original ones by Mihnea Gheorghiu). The institution was again well-regarded in the 1960s, when a selective liberalization was initiated by communist leader Nicolae Ceaușescu. The period overlapped with Ion Dezideriu Sîrbu's employment as a dramaturge, and with a programmatic emphasis on Marxist humanism. The company premiered new plays, including Sîrbu's and Sorescu's, and introduced actors such as Tudor Gheorghe.

In 1973, Ceaușescu's regime erected the TNC's new building, which came to be lauded as one of the most functional and elegant projects in local communist architecture. The reintroduction of ideological scrutiny and censorship directly affected the TNC, especially in the 1980s; under Emil Boroghină's management, a new generation of directors, including Mircea Cornișteanu, Cristian Hadji-Culea and Silviu Purcărete, subverted pressures by recontexualizing plays and encoding critiques of Ceaușescu. The end of communism encouraged more experimentation, and, into the late 1990s, the TNC was internationally famous, especially for Purcărete's avant-garde productions; from 1994, it has been hosting its own Shakespeare festival. Cornișteanu's term as TNC manager consolidated national fame for local actors such as Mirela Cioabă, Vlad Dellakeza and Ilie Gheorghe, though the company was also affected by financial instability and a string of poor reviews. In the 2010 and 2020s, its program remained divided between local classics and fully experimental plays. Its routine was interrupted by the activity of guest directors, including Robert Wilson and Declan Donnellan.

== Roots ==
=== Beginnings of theatrical life ===
The early days of theatrical life in Craiova reflect developments in the cultural life of Wallachia—one of the two Danubian Principalities, existing as autonomous components of the Ottoman Empire. Craiova historian George Franga argued in a 1973 article that the beginnings of such activities can be traced to March 1830: a poster, written in French and German rather than the vernacular Romanian, announces that Antonachy Burelly's townhouse was hosting performances of comedies by August von Kotzebue. Franga also notes an opera performance in March 1837. This is more reliably attributed to a "German" touring company, which sang I puritani, by Vincenzo Bellini. In 1838, Craiova already had six music schools, one of which was housed in the Poroianu complex. They gave regular concerts, helping to consolidate a local tradition. As attested in a period letter by Ioan Maiorescu, before 1847 the scions of the local boyardom had fully embraced amateur theater, and were performing for each other in wintertime. Such private shows, done for a small audience, ranged from tragedy to pantomime. By 1840, Craiova was the permanent home of the French immigrant actors, identified as "Valeri" and "Theodor Gafrey". These two placed a demand with the Oltenian regency, seeking approval to perform "on days when there are no club meetings". As Franga notes, the two new arrivals were also managers of the "Craiova French Theater", attested in March 1841. They introduced Oltenians to the works of Eugène Scribe and Jean-François Bayard; at exactly the same time, the city welcomed in two English acrobats, Nicholas Craft and John Atterbury, who gave professional circus performances.

Theatrical life went through an unexpected hiatus during the Wallachian Revolution of 1848, and especially during its quelling by the Ottoman and Austrian armies (1848–1850), who restored order under a conservative Wallachian Prince, Barbu Dimitrie Știrbei. These two military forces also occupied Craiova, and its only usable auditorium, located within the Central School for Boys, became their barracks. During these events, Costache Caragiale's company in Bucharest had to shut down its theater; it is possible, though not fully certain, that Alecu Corcoveanu and his troupe of actors were performing at the time in Craiova's public gardens. One local tradition is that Caragiale himself came to Craiova, helping to form its permanent company. This account relies on details about Caragiale's associate, Ion Gestianu-Mihuț, who settled in Craiova in 1849, and remained there, as a member of the troupe, for the rest of his career. Scholar Lelia Nădejde believes that both Caragiale and his pupil, Constantin Dimitriade, were at Craiova in 1849.

In mid-1850, Dolj County's governor, Dimitrie Filișanu, heard a demand by his citizens, which was to set up a permanent theater. He acquiesced, bringing in Caragiale's former associate, Costache Mihăileanu, to organize a permanent company in Craiova. The employees that Mihăileanu and his sister Ralița took to Craiova are believed to have included Dimitriade, Mihail Pascaly, Constantin Serghie, and I. Vlădicescu, joined by sisters Maria, Polina, and Raluca Stavrescu. The first mention of shows being performed under Mihăileanu's direction is from 29 June (Old Style: 18 July) 1850—on that day, Vestitorul Românesc of Bucharest published an article by the Craiova intellectual, Gheorghe Chițu, with detail on what was being done to make the Central School into a theatrical venue. It is, according to Franga, also the first piece of theater criticism to come out of Craiova. Two plays were being produced—one by Caragiale, and the other by Vasile Alecsandri; as Franga argues, Caragiale himself most likely appeared in at least one of the roles.

Craiova in the 1850s, with the old theater building in the foreground

A teenager at the time, the Craiova native Ștefan Vellescu recalls being allowed to perform a small role in Molière's comedy, Monsieur de Pourceaugnac, which was his debut on the stage. In November 1850, Mihăileanu also directed, and starred in, Matei Millo's operetta, Baba Hârca. The ongoing performances infuriated some members of the Wallachian Orthodox hierarchy. In June 1851, the Archbishop of Râmnic, Calinic, observed that a Christian school was hosting petreceri de noapte sub denumirea de teatru ("nighttime parties that they call a theater"), and pleaded with Prince Știrbei that he suppress the new institution. The request was already anachronistic, since, from late 1850, the company had been ordered to evict the school, and a new hall was being built to accommodate its activities.

=== Stroescu, Gănescu, Theodorini ===
The budding institution was assigned its own hall, but this was hastily constructed, timber-framed with wattle-and-daub infill. Despite such modest conditions, it was already being referred to as a "national theater"—the name is used as such in demand for sponsorship by Toma Strâmbeanu, who may also have been the first Craiova-based playwright. The full program of the 1851–1852 season remains unattested, but it is known to have included three plays—a comédie en vaudevilles, a farce, and a regular work of drama; all had the same Wallachian author, I. Dimitrescu. The institution already had a monopolizing role on the city's cultural scene, which was generally poorer than that of other centers of culture. This issue was highlighted in 1966 by dramatist Ion Dezideriu Sîrbu:

The National Theatre of Craiova has been, for almost a hundred years now, the center of cultural life in Oltenia. [It] has stood in for an Atheneum, an Opera House, an Academy and a Library. It is only now, only for these past few years, that it has begun to cede its prerogatives, one by one; but in the last century it was a spiritual valve, the only spiritual valve, through which the rich soul of Oltenia could breathe, allowing for the only possible connection with the great literature of Europe and with the great ideals of the time.

Mihăileanu and his employees left Craiova in 1852, having been offered full-time employment by the National Theater Bucharest (TNB). The TNC survived, with Pavel Stoenescu as manager, who remained there to his death, and with Raluca Stavrescu, who worked in Craiova until 1875. Theodor Theodorini, a Moldavian-born actor, was called in as manager in August 1853; Prince Știrbei validated his appointment, but only as long as he promised not to engage in political "jibes", as Mihăileanu had. Theodorini divided himself among several theaters until 1859; he then spent the rest of his active life in Craiova, also creating a small theatrical school, distantly inspired by naturalist movements. Vellescu, who had studied under Caragiale, returned to Craiova in 1854, and rejoined the company. In early 1853, Theodorini had established an orchestra, whose first conductor was another Moldavian, Alexandru Flechtenmacher. The musician married a Craiova actress, Maria Mavrodin.

Pavel Stoenescu with wife Ralița Mihăileanu and daughter Maria (herself a future TNC actress)

During Theodorini's stay, conditions steadily degenerated; as Sîrbu observes, he was "at the mercy of a narrow bureaucratic 'Dolj government', [requiring him] to perform diplomatic and financial acrobatics". A local boyar, Pera Opran, was the actors' sponsor; for one season (1853–1854), he was manager, director, and actor, using composer Eduard Wachmann as conductor. On 31 December 1856, the building was destroyed in a freak fire, and Theodorini had to redirect his energies into having it rebuilt. The project required participation of the local boyars. In the newly erected building, they constructed themselves booths that were marked with their family names. In 1858–1859, the TNC's business side was handled by Scarlat Gănescu, who reestablished the orchestra and reemployed Flechtenmacher. He also recruited Stonescu and Ralița Mihăileanu's daughter, Maria, who spent the next 60 years at a TNC member. Gănescu's term overlapped with the unification of Moldavia and Wallachia, resulting in a federated monarchy, eventually called "Principality of Romania". At the start of the process, in January 1859, Flechtenmacher composed and performed the musical number Cimpoiul dracului, with unionist politician Eugeniu Carada in a singing role. According to Carada himself, the local boyardom was vexed by its political slogans, and stepped in to have it censored.

At the height of the 1850s political restructuring, the TNC went through another crisis. In April 1859, Gănescu fled to Bucharest, leaving behind the unpaid and disgruntled staff; Flechtenmacher quit in August. Theodorini had taken charge on 18 July 1859, deciding that Gănescu's previous acts had been voided. He himself celebrated the union's first anniversary, on 24 January 1860, by staging his own patriotic play, Românul este tot român, at the TNC. Faced with a foreclosure, he attempted to obtain state support; he also founded an SA company, nominally active from March 1860—but closed down abruptly in May, just as a period of large-scale social unrest was starting in Oltenia. Exactly a year later, with the TNC directly controlled by the Ministry of Internal Affairs, Theodorini was only allowed some limited autonomy, but had to submit his repertory for approval. The program he submitted shows that he was producing plays by Casimir Delavigne (Louis XI), Alexandre Dumas fils (The Lady of the Camellias), Victor Hugo (Ruy Blas, Le roi s'amuse), Friedrich Schiller (The Robbers), and Wachmann (Fata aerului).

=== Theodorini dynasty ===
Over the 1860s, Theodorini made discreet efforts to counter influence and censorship by the local politicians. He recruited a troupe of actors specifically to advance and proclaim, in his own terms, "the prosperity of the Romanian nation." In time, he expressed some solidarity with the liberal-and-radical circles: in 1862, he held a TNC benefit ball, supporting a defense fund for the imprisoned peasant spokesman, Mircea Mălăeru. Under his watch, the company registered some significant milestones. By 1864, it had become especially strong as a music theater, showcasing original works by Karl Theodor Wagner, who was at the time also TNC conductor. In 1866, with his non-singing troupe, Theodorini produced Nikolai Gogol's Government Inspector, which is upheld as the first-ever Romanian production of a Russian play.

From early 1865, Theodorini focused his efforts on obtaining increased state funding for the TNC. He received 20,000 lei, but only in exchange for moral and political guarantees, as well as a promise to produce at least six new plays per season (including localized shows from the Comédie-Française and Théâtre du Vaudeville). In 1866–1867, Valeri returned as stage director, producing a number of plays, by the likes of Delavigne, Hugo, Joseph Bouchardy, Duma père, and Bogdan Petriceicu Hasdeu (with a local monopoly on the latter's Râzvan și Vidra). Craiovans were still unusually hard to please: they only showed up for the premiere of Kean, with almost no spectators present for the second showing. The TNC was able to assist in Theodorini's personal triumph of early 1871, when it toured Bucharest (at a time when the TNB was facing bankruptcy). The elites were generally absent from such shows, though the lower orders filled up the stalls. Plays shown included Octave Feuillet's Julie, Alfred de Musset's Andrea del Sarto, and melodramas by Sardou; as noted by theatrical historian Ioan Massoff, the Romanian plays, by Vasile Alecsandri, Ioan Lupescu, and V. A. Urechia, were "of entirely modest value". Massoff also notes that Theodorini, who directed the production, had an unusually fast-paced method, which Bucharesters grew to dislike; by the end of the tour, the stalls were again nearly empty. The troupe itself is known to have detested Theodorini for putting them under financial stress.

Massoff observes that the effort of touring, and his return to an unforgiving public, made Theodorini mentally unstable. His wife, Maria Stavrescu-Theodorini, became the real manager, while her husband had to be hospitalized after on-stage fits. As noted by philologist Georgeta Țurcanu, his "superhuman efforts" to keep the TNC afloat were directly responsible for his downfall: "disgusted by Craiova's upper-crust, who had tried to turn the theater into a venue for its parties, [he] suffered a nervous breakdown and died, in full artistic maturity". Maria was already in charge for the 1871–1872, in which she tried to win back Craiovan spectators, bringing in new talents such as Aristizza Romanescu and Clotilda Calfoglu, and stagining more operettas than dramas; the TNC was however stipped of its municipal grants, and left to struggle. In May 1877, a new law on theaters mandated that the TNC be supervised by two censors, one appointed by the city government and the other by the Ministry of Public Instruction (the first such duo was made up of G. Fontanin and Ioan Theodorian).

Theodorini was finally left distraught by the death of his young daughter, Lucrezzia, shortly after she had debuted on stage. According to Sîrbu (who simplifies the account by noting that the manager "went insane"), Maria fully took over in 1878, precisely as Romania was obtaining independence from the Ottoman Empire. According to a retrospective published in Olteanul newspaper in 1886, during the 1870s the TNC was a modest moral and cultural guide, which enabled vulnerable women of the mahalale to uphold their self-respect. Local historian Tudor Nedelcea notes that the program of the period continued to be largely mysterious, with some plays attested only long after their premieres. He proposes that the wartime playbill included Gheorghe Neculau's adaptation from The Count of Monte Cristo, performed at fundraisers for the Romanian Land Forces; Nedelcea also argues that such shows were attended by poet Mihai Eminescu, who chronicled them in a newspaper article, possibly indicating his physical presence in Craiova.

The TNC's activity during the early years of the Kingdom of Romania (proclaimed in 1881) was in large part obscure. Sîrbu describes that period as one of "persecutions, indignities, [and] financial meltdowns." Despite threats that the theater would be condemned and razed, it continued to stage plays throughout the 1880s, and was briefly joined by a Moldavian operetta star, Vasile Hasnaș. In November 1886, it registered another milestone with the comedy O scrisoare pierdută—one of the major texts by Costache Caragiale's more famous nephew, Ion Luca Caragiale. It was an unusually great success, with four quick reprisals. Ion Anestin appeared as The Inebriated Citizen, and won Caragiale's attention—when the latter took on as chairman of the TNB (1888–1889), Anestin became a member of that more established troupe. In 1887, the theater stood as the first Craiova building to have electric lighting. It was then rebuilt and refurbished by Theodor and Maria's daughter, Elena Theodorini. A highly successful operatic singer, she was also scheduled to attend the grand reopening in September 1888.

Early managers
Theodor Theodorini

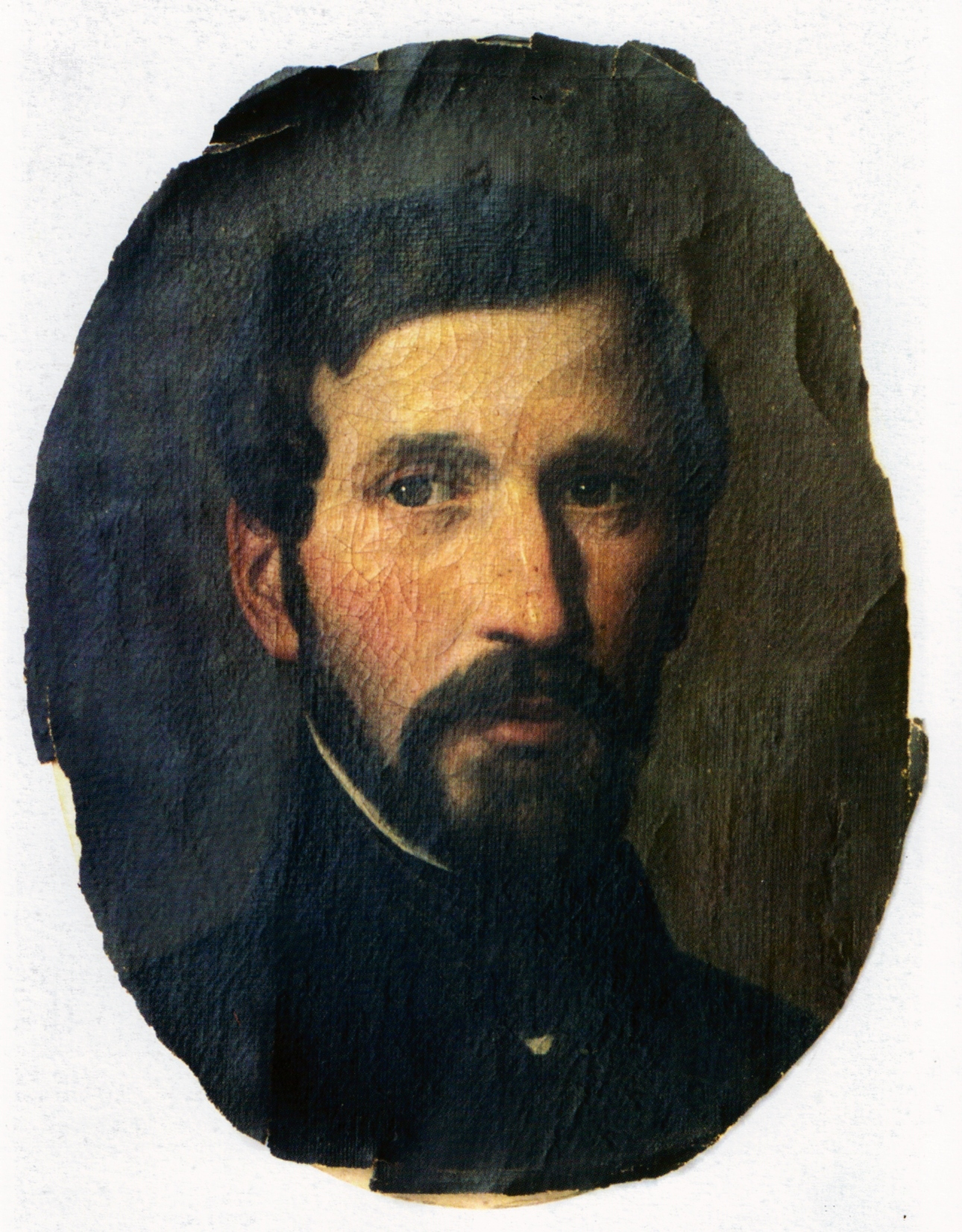
Pera Opran

Maria Stavrescu-Theodorini

== Modernization era ==
=== Livescu's rebellion ===
Ion Livescu (as Pygmalion of Tyre) with Clotilda Calfoglu and Mia Teodorescu in an 1894 photograph (for the TNC production of George Bengescu-Dabija's play)

Theodorini's troupe officially became a "national theater" only in September 1889, when it came to be budgeted by the state and was placed under a committee of caretakers: Nicolae Economu, Ulysse Boldescu, and Alexandru Grecescu. Initially, it took in 14,000 lei as a monthly subsidy, and employed a 40-man orchestra. Shortly after this revamp, the TNC came to be scrutinized by the right-wing Conservative Party, whose support base regarded provincial cultural institutions as money-pits. Maria Theodorini resigned in November 1889, after Grecescu had refused to increase funding. The right-leaning Universul paper argued in October 1891 that the institution was entirely unsound, making a profit of 87,600 lei while having expenditures of 97,000 lei. For that season, the TNC had 45 actors, 21 instrument-players, and two prompters, "or a total of 68 de people, who are supposed to be making a living [in] Craiova." Smaller portions of the budget also went out as royalties, with Caragiale alone collecting 715 lei in 1897.

Actor Ion Livescu, who joined the TNC in late 1895 on Boldescu's invitation, noted that his colleagues—including Calfoglu and a returning Anestin—were generally past their prime, as "former combatants alongside Theodorini". The only two other youths were Mia Teodorescu and Marioara Cornescu. Livescu also found that Craiovans were resistant to modernizing trends, wishing to see melodramas such as Two Orphans and anything by Matei Millo. The TNC had established its operetta school, which, as actor Velimir Maximilian recalls, was imported in from Bucharest "around 1890." It thrived at its new location, with Adelina Caiser and Irina de Vladaia serving as its leading ladies. In July 1892, Adevărul daily argued that Craiova's singers in the genre were Romania's best, and that all other operetta theaters, including Bucharest's various companies, could easily be closed down as long as Caiser and her Craiova colleagues remained active.

At the beginning of the 1894–1895 season, the regular actors were unpaid, and no longer showed up for work. The Public Instruction Ministry, headed at the time by Take Ionescu, decided to punish actors by ordering a mass review of their contracts, but was forced to rescind within days. The operetta section was touched by another controversy, after its dramaturge and librettist, G. D. Pencioiu, had added his own political couplets to Karl Millöcker's Der arme Jonathan. George Târnoveanu, who took over as committee leader later that season, is credited by Livescu with improving the state of affairs, managing to both increase the salaries and buy new props. He was unable to maintain the operetta section, which became fully itinerant after 1895.

Livescu was at the time directing, and starring in, George Bengescu-Dabija's play about Pygmalion of Tyre, claiming it as his first major success in the craft. He followed up with many other productions in what he himself describes as a "motley" program. Without entirely shunning the popular musicals, he added more modern works, including foreign classics (Ruy Blas, Eugène Labiche's Petits Oiseaux) and local texts. Examples of the latter included Răzvan și Vidra, Vasile Alecsandri's Fântâna Blanduziei, Ioan Bacalbașa's De focul birului, Urechia's Banul Mărăcine, and Caragiale's Năpasta.

Following changes in the city government team, lawyer N. Viișoreanu became a delegate on the TNC committee. He and Livescu had major disagreements over management issues, as well as over political affairs; Livescu, who obtained support from Anestin and various others, campaigned for Viișoreanu to be sacked and replaced with an apolitical manager. The National Liberal Party (PNL), meanwhile, had a platform of increasing funding for provincial theaters. Its 1898 cabinet announced that it would increase TNC funding by 15,000 lei; this provision was tacitly removed from the proposed budget during voting in the Assembly. As Livescu awaited to be heard by the Minister of Public Instruction, who was the reform-minded Spiru Haret, he was punished by Viișoreanu, who had him sacked from the TNC. The dispute dragged on for the duration of local elections in 1899, and was then carried to the courts. Though these ended up clearing his name, Livescu left Craiova, deciding never to return.

=== Between Olteanu and Gabrielescu ===
Petre I. Sturdza as Doctor Stockmann in An Enemy of the People, 1907 TNC production

Alexandru G. Olteanu, who served on the TNC's steering committee in the 1900s, complained that the institution was a battleground between the Conservatives and his own PNL colleagues; these conflicts also reflected tensions over the Public Instruction Ministry. As Olteanu noted, the PNL's third Sturdza cabinet, arriving in power in 1901, inherited a TNC whose debt ran at 42,000 lei, which was more than its annual budget (itself reduced to 30,000 lei in 1902). He and his colleagues managed to persuade the titular minister (still Haret) to ignore the deficit and provide an additional 5,000 in funding for the operetta—but were then surprised to note that the public still did not buy enough tickets. The city mayor, Nicolae Romanescu, also covered the deficit, albeit with smaller sums; however, the troupe was reduced to cut down on costs. An anonymous report from early 1903 informed Haret that the situation had still not improved for those who were kept on: "there are no payroll rosters, no formal minutes from the theater committee, [and] the actors have not been paid for months." The actors supplemented their income by going on tours of beer-gardens, for which they merged with various other troupes, including Liciu's. Maximilian joined them in mid-1902, but performances were nearly canceled due to heavy rains.

In 1904, opera singer Grigore Gabrielescu took over as TNC manager. His arrival did not immediately persuade theatergoers that an improvement was possible; as V. Bănescu wrote in the conservative Sămănătorul, the 1905–1906 season had been inaugurated by "two of those loathsome productions, contrived on flimsy and unseemly themes, spiced with slum-like wit, full of double entendres that would make any person of common sense blush". Gabrielescu was instead celebrated for his other work, in securing the institution's material survival. He thus obtained that the mayor's office purchase back the theater's building, which had been foreclosed by a bank, and provide an additional subsidy for the actors. Part of the credit went to actors Constantin Radovici and Romuald Bulfinsky, who were permanently employed at the TNC by 1904. Here, they staged Radovici's own highly successful play, Drama de la Belgrad, which stabilized the precarious budget.

Gabrielescu's rescue of the building was closely followed by a lawsuit, whereby Elena Theodorini demanded to be paid 12,000 lei in back-rent. In the 1906–1907 season, the building was closed for a while due to a large-scale peasant uprising, but Gabrielescu still reported net profits of 30,800 lei. From March, the company's lead actor and stage director was Petre I. Sturdza, who also arrived with his wife, Alice Negruzzi-Sturdza. Alongside Constantin Mărculescu, they proceeded to diversify the program, adding works by Dumas fils, Alphonse Daudet, and Henrik Ibsen, though still allowing Eugène Cormon's melodramas to be performed. The Sturdzas and their troupe took An Enemy of the People and Dumas' Ami des femmes to Brăila and Galați, and, as Petre notes, defied the snobbish society of Bucharest by also performing in that city, at the Lyrical Theater. They were sometimes met with indignant protests by their provincial competitors, who described Ibsen as a radical and Dumas as a pornographer. This was also when the first-ever Oltenian performance of Hamlet was done by Sturdza from a still fragmentary text; by 1909, it had become a favorite role for other troupe members, Mărculescu and Al. Demetrescu Dan.

In March 1908, the Sturdzas had a farewell show addressed to their "excellent and kind Craiovan audience" (with the Erckmann-Chatrian comedy, L'Ami Fritz), and afterwards left for better opportunities in Bucharest. As argued by literary historian Niculae Gheran, in the 1910s the Craiova scene trailed behind other centers, largely due to a "total lack of empathy by local authorities." He notes additionally that the "unreformed" public maintained its "bad taste", only allowing the company to act in tried-and-tested plays, including Baba Hârca. There was also a sizable supply of foreign plays, but, as reported by Românul newspaper, these were "melodramas and farces, translated in the most haphazard way", helping to enshrine the TNC's image as a "paragon of small-town theaters". The location itself had become particularly inauspicious, as detailed in notes kept by a contemporary, Corneliu Moldovanu:

The working conditions in Craiova were utterly deplorable! The hall looked like a stable and the stage was no bigger than a quilter's shop... The theater's stoves, which were hidden right under the footlights, threw out heat like bakery-ovens.

The TNC's failings as an education institution became a target of interest from the PNL, and especially from Haret, who had returned at the ministry. In September 1910, Haret assigned Olteanu as TNC chairman. In an interview with Viitorul, the new appointee noted that he was going to create a more varied program. He reported that he had also managed to sign up local celebrities, including Negruzzi-Sturdza, Mărculescu, Aristizza Romanescu; Olteanu was also keen to bring in new operetta acts, by Constantin Grigoriu and his troupe. The following year, he boasted as his main achievement the increase of his troupe's salaries. On 28 May 1911, Isidor Chețeanu took over for Olteanu. In his inaugural speech, he noted that "circumstances beyond his control had forced him to accept the directorship", which he had never otherwise sought. Chețeanu resigned just days after, allegedly because his wife was jealous of the actresses he met at his workplace.

=== Gârleanu–Rebreanu duo ===
TNC building c. 1910

On 11 June 1911, by order of a Conservative cabinet, writer Emil Gârleanu was made TNC chairman, and immediately brought in his friend, Liviu Rebreanu, to serve as dramaturge. The latter took a hands-on approach, working directly with stage director Demetrescu Dan, and once personally handling an outdoor performance in Sinaia. This change of management was also welcomed by the local magazine, Ramuri, as a change of fortunes. Its editor, D. Tomescu, referred to the Gârleanu–Rebreanu duo as "men of action", who stood poised to make the TNC into a leading stage of the nation. According to Gheran, the locally famous Gârleanu was in fact successful at persuading the titular minister, Constantin C. Arion, to allocate more funds for the TNC (though he still had to perform "repeated acts of groveling, so as to ensure payment of his actors and other staff members"). The team was able to commission a celebrated poet, Victor Eftimiu, to write them a play, Rapsozii, which then went into production at Craiova.

Even before the new season had opened, the managers sought to engage the public with performances at agricultural shows and at least one other open-air production, in Bibescu Park. The official opening was on 9 October 1911. Brought in from Bucharest, Agatha Bârsescu joined Bulfinsky in a performance of Cu ochii plâng, a one-act play by A. de Herz. The show also involved Ion Anestin, who was the troupe's oldest actor, who recited alongside poets Moldovanu, Ștefan Octavian Iosif, Ion Minulescu, and D. Nanu. Rapsozii was also premiered, with a cast that included Ștefan Braborescu; in it, Demetrescu Dan was Mihai Eminescu and Rebreanu's own wife, Fanny, appeared as Veronica Micle. On this festive occasion, also joined by Minister Arion, some of the seats were filled by the Rebreanus' literary friends—including figures such as Eftimiu and Dimitrie Anghel (co-authors of the rhyming prologue), I. A. Bassarabescu, Alexandru Cazaban, Oreste Georgescu, Anastasie Mândru, and I. U. Soricu.

The TNC openly stated its affiliations with Ion Luca Caragiale's school of comedy, celebrating that author's sixtieth birthday, in January 1912, with the first-ever "Caragiale Week". Several authors argue that, when it comes to Craiova, theatrical realism began with Gârleanu—the first chairman to have asked that Hamlet be done in period-accurate settings, when his predecessors had used Louis XIV furniture. His tenure also witnessed the first professional translations. Rebreanu was the first person tasked with a TNC program in this respect. Being himself highly proficient in Hungarian and German, he did his own versions of Arno Holz (Traumulus), Ferenc Molnár (The Guardsman), and Friedrich Schiller (The Robbers); for additional projects, he used other authors, for instance contracting Anghel to work on Fernand Vandérem's Cher Maître. With Gârleanu at the TNC, Craiova hosted several stage productions by Ermete Novelli and his company, including with The Taming of the Shrew. These were covered for Ramuri by Rebreanu himself. As he noted therein, the TNC hall was "almost entirely empty", despite Novelli's international stardom—he complained that Craiovans only packed in for "shows of no artistic value."

Authors such as Florea Firan argue that some 24 separate plays were performed while Rebreanu was a dramaturge; this claim is challenged by Gheran, who believes that the count includes works produced under Gabrielescu, and not discontinued by Gârleanu. Fanny Rebreanu, who was for a while the star actress, is known to have appeared in at least one staging of The Guardsman (April 1912). Gârleanu's refusal to grant her a vacation resulted in her leaving the company in May; she took her husband with her. Scholar C. D. Papastate observes that, from his months in Craiova, Rebreanu preserved a dislike of antisemitism and extreme Romanian nationalism, immediately recording their manifestations in an article for Rampa (which chided Craiova's public for having mistreated a Jewish actor, Al. B. Leonescu). Another Rebreanu piece, called Întâiul gropar ("The First Gravedigger"), discusses the Craiova actor and gym teacher, Al. Nanu. Rebreanu also looked back on his Craiova stint with an article in Rampa. He praised Gârleanu as having already elevated the institution's prestige, as effectively its re-founder. However, he declared his ennui at having had to deal with the regional scene. Completing his earlier observations, he argued that Oltenians only responded to melodramas by Adolphe d'Ennery, and to Grigoriu singing in Die keusche Susanne.

Gârleanu himself favored nationalist and historicist art, and agreed to produce Nicolae Iorga's play about Michael the Brave. He prioritized Romanian authors and local settings, obtaining that his company be the first to perform Moldovanu's Fluturii, Constantin Râuleț's Cei mai de samă, and Mihail Sorbul's Săracul Popa. In the years after Rebreanu's departure, the TNC became noted for the activities of actor Mișu Fotino, who was acclaimed for his contribution in the local adaptation of George Bernard Shaw's Pygmalion (1913). Also joining the troupe was Coco Demetrescu, who raised his young son, the future poet Radu Gyr, in the artistic atmosphere of the 1910s TNC. The authorities came to realize that, despite constant funding, the TNC was again running into debt. In July 1912, Carol I, as reigning King of Romania, personally stepped in, decreeing that the Ministry of Public Instruction, which had taken hold of the TNC building, be granted 28,000 lei especially for its upkeep. As inspector-general of the theaters, Haralamb Lecca was asked to investigate the underlying causes. He cleared Gârleanu of all suspicions, instead noting that "other people are at fault [for this]." At the time, Gârleanu had come to be interested in the artistic and educational potential of local film, writing a screenplay about the Neamț Citadel; a Frenchman, simply known as "Pierre", directed the subsequent production, filmed in the follies of Bibescu Park. All roles went to the TNC company of actors, with Fotino and Mia Teodorescu as leads. According to conflicting sources, production credits of this lost film should go to Gârleanu, Moldovanu, or even Rebreanu.

Early 1910s team
Al. Demetrescu Dan

Victor Eftimiu

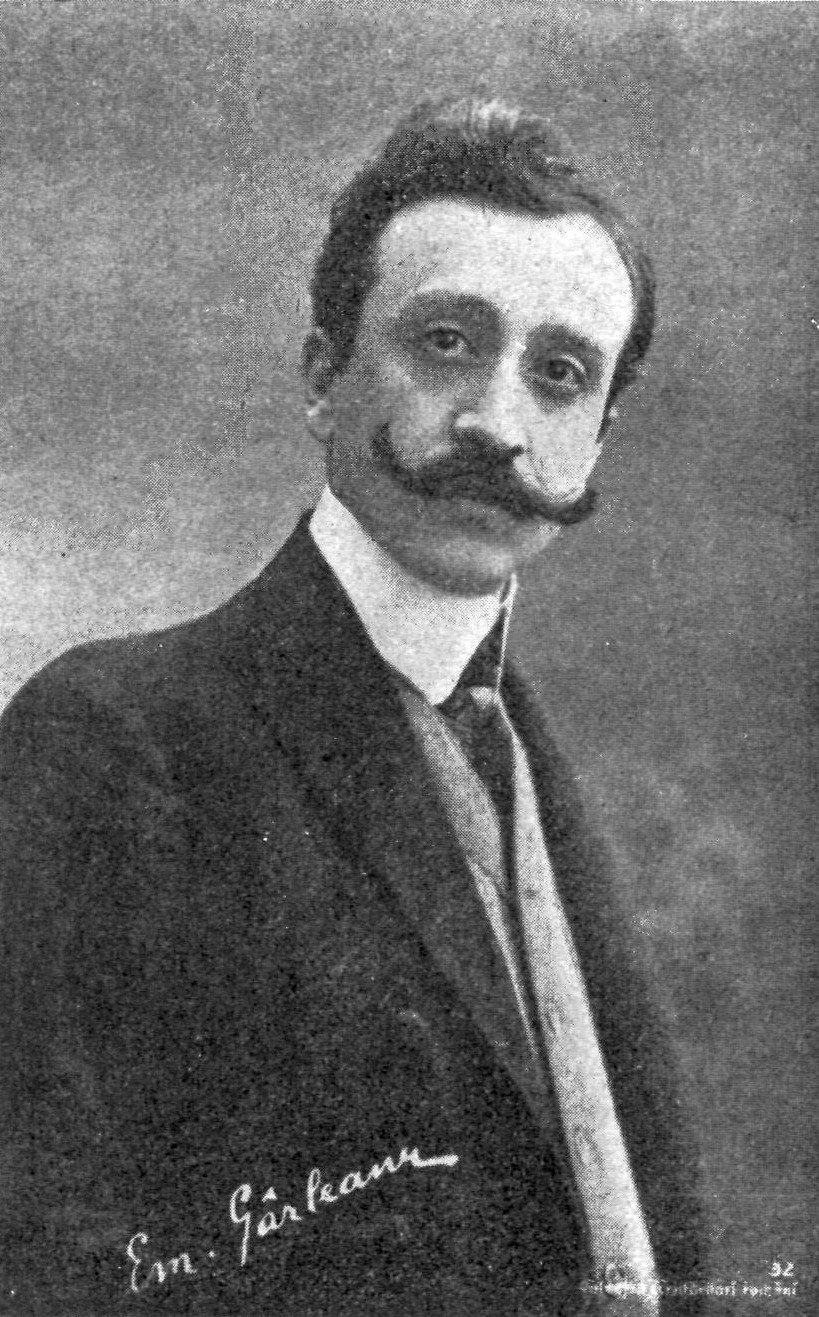
Emil Gârleanu

Fanny Rebreanu

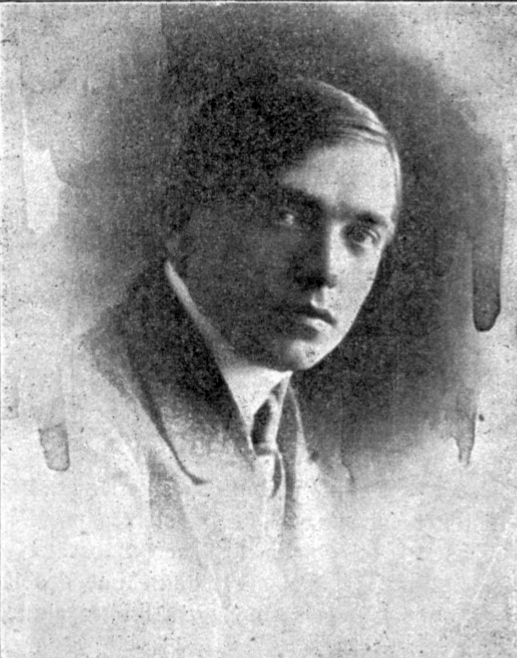
Liviu Rebreanu

== In Greater Romania ==
=== World War I and subsequent decline ===
Gârleanu was largely absent from Craiova during mid-1913; although seriously ill, he was making efforts to enlist for service in the ongoing war in the Balkans. He was operated on for pyonephrosis in Câmpulung, in April 1914. As his wife reports, during his departure there was already a concerted attempt to remove him; she describes a cabal headed by Craiova's PNL mayor, Nicolae Romanescu. Gârleanu failed to recover from surgery and died some days after. His predecessor Gabrielescu, who was afflicted by a disease which impaired his ability to sing, eventually shot himself in March 1915. During the early stages of World War I, Romania kept neutral, but divided between supporters of the Entente and the Central Powers. In early 1916, TNC actor Ionel Băjescu-Oardă was arrested by the Siguranța, and charged with being part of a swindlers' syndicate.

Shortly after declaring for the Entente in mid-1916, the Romanian Kingdom was suffered a set of heavy defeats; its southern portions, including Oltenia, were occupied by the Central Powers. During that interval, Anestin made his final comeback, agreeing to revive a semblance of activity on the TNC stage. The rest of the troupe followed the Romanian authorities into fortified Western Moldavia, temporarily joining the Iași National Theater. Together with violinist George Enescu, Fotino and Băjescu-Oardă entertained the wounded soldiers. During a temporary peace in summer 1918, occupied Craiova was visited by the Sturdzas and their traveling troupe.

Months later, changes in military and political conditions resulted in victory for the Ententist side, as well as in the creation of Greater Romania. Some of the troupe left for permanent employment in the new territories—the National Theater Cluj made successful efforts to recruit a Craiova trio, formed by George Mihăilescu-Brăila, Nicolae Neamțu-Ottonel, and I. Stănescu-Papa. Discussing the early interwar period, historian Ana-Maria Popescu suggests that the Craiova theater, "perhaps even more than others", was characterized by "hasty" productions and a mixture of genres, from "classical Romanian drama" to boulevardier. She argues that the sheer quantity of plays and styles "creates the impression of artistic instability", but also that every season included at least some premieres that attest "to a constant and constantly elevated artistic taste." The TNC quickly changed its managers in this new political setting: Constantin N. Cantuniari (1918–1919) was replaced by a lawyer, Vasile G. Sandulian (1919–1920), then by the returning 1910s chairman, Olteanu (1920–1921). Sandulian also returned, for a second stint (1921–1922), being followed by Iancu Constantinescu (1922–1923) and Ștefan Boțoiu (1922–1923).

The main stage director was Fotino, but he was forced into resignation by Boțoiu in May 1923. His position was taken, and then held for many years on end, by Constantin Mărculescu, seconded by Demetrescu Dan and Emil Bobescu. The company was struggling, submitting specific requests for funding. In one document from 1921, it demanded that its troupe and its pensioners receive 2,000 kilograms of onions for their nutritional needs. It also faced unwanted competition from unlicensed companies and local restaurateurs, who put up cheap shows that divided the public. The Craiova hall, meanwhile, attracted various companies from other parts of Romania. In March 1919, it hosted a Bucharest troupe managed by Marioara Voiculescu; this feat was matched in 1921 by Tony Bulandra, and in 1923 by both Bârsescu and Ion Manolescu. The TNC departed on its own tours, including an inaugural visit to the newly unified regions. In February 1922, it performed in Timișoara, Deva, and Alba Iulia. The TNC was the subject of much mockery in articles signed by a local, "Petre Diacu", which appeared in Viața Romînească during the early 1920s. The author was tracked down by the infuriated elite, who discovered that he was Petre Pandrea, a student at Carol I National College (which had replaced the Central School); Pandrea only narrowly avoided being expelled. Young actors were still recruited in that context—including A. Pop Marțian, who debuted at the TNC in a 1922 staging of O scrisoare pierdută.

=== Under Drăgoescu and Dongorozi ===
In early 1923, Grigore Drăgoescu became TNC chairman. He himself told a reporter that Boțoiu had had to step down after a government investigation, "the cause of which is not known to me", while also noting that the theater as he entered it was in a "precarious situation", with many actors having resigned. Drăgoescu managed the institution until 1926, and also rehired Fotino. Honored by Sîrbu as one of two "hearty chairmen" (alongside Olteanu), he openly spoke about the TNC's financial troubles, which "drove us to the point where we went about the city with a subscription list, raise pennies for the urgent needs of our theater." According to a period note in Curierul Olteniei newspaper, such efforts was rendered ineffectual by the widespread indifference of local literati.

Drăgoescu, who ended up donating his own salary for the project, still managed to modernize the theater in sweeping moves, changing its electrical wiring, also building a dome and a proscenium. He took pride in having banned all non-theatrical people from entering the backstage area, and also in having stabilized the budget, allowing him to pay his actors both in salaries and bonuses. During his tenure, eighteen troupe members went on a sponsored study trip to Vienna. The TNC formed its own team of set designers, including painters Alexandru Brătășanu and Vasile Velisăratu, and, by employing the White Russian émigré Elena Barlo, also had the first female costume designer in Romania. Victor Bumbești was called in to direct plays, winning the public with a modernist version of Anghel and Iosif's Legenda funigeilor. A twenty-year-old Radu Gyr was invited in to contribute texts. It was at the TNC that he premiered his first work in musical comedy, Căciulița Roșie. In November 1925, Gyr also contributed entr'actes for Molière's George Dandin, in which his father was the lead. These numbers were performed by actors Leonard Divarius and Margot Boteanu; academic commentary on the play was by a visiting scholar, Ion Al. Vasilescu-Valjean.

The TNC briefly employed another director, known to the local public simply as "Daniel". Poet Constantin Nissipeanu, who places Daniel's arrival to 1926, recalls that he had trained with Max Reinhardt and the Vilna Troupe, and that he stayed in the city after falling in love with a local lady. His one season at the TNC was "extraordinary", giving local theatergoers a taste of the theatrical avant-garde. Nissipeanu additionally sees him as protected by actor Tudor Călin, but as increasingly opposed by Drăgoescu, who had him sacked. Popescu, who recounts the same events as taking place in 1925, also mentions that the main conflict over Daniel's stay was between Drăgoescu and the local writer-activist, Elena Farago. Upon Daniel's departure, Farago also resigned from the TNC steering committee. The events are briefly mentioned in a letter that Liviu Rebreanu sent to Farago in December 1925: "I don't know what happened at the Craiova theater committee, [but] regret that that famous committee doesn't realize how much it dishonors itself by [ejecting] the only valuable element it still had".

Drăgoescu himself was replaced by a local writer, Ion Dongorozi. His brief term, covering 1926–1927, began with opportunities for growth; Dongorozi signed up a new stage director, Victor Ion Popa. Their partnership made the TNC a nationally famous stage, with acclaimed productions of František Langer (Velbloud uchem jehly), Molière (The School for Wives, Tartuffe), Luigi Pirandello (Henry IV, Right You Are), Jules Renard (Poil de Carotte), and William Shakespeare (Richard III). Manolescu also took up Shakespearean tragedy, with a 1925 version of Hamlet—the first integral performance of that play on any Romanian stage. Bumbești and Bobescu both worked with Dongorozi. The former had noted productions of The Government Inspector and Maxim Gorky's The Lower Depths, whereas Bobescu did a similarly well-regarded version of one play by Leo Tolstoy (The Power of Darkness). The managerial team was joined by poet Eugen Constant, who was also the TNC's accountant. Also then, Dongorozi invested in propaganda, with literary meetings that were attended by the local celebrities, including Tudor Arghezi and Vasile Voiculescu; the company inaugurated countryside tours, with performances given at Băilești, Cetate, Filiași, and Segarcea.

=== Tomescu and Sturdza ===
Smouldering ruins of the TNC building after the 1927 fire

In his overview of theatrical history, Ion Valentin Anestin referred to "the Dongorozi season" as a "swan song" of the old TNC. The crises affecting all local theaters were deepened in 1925, when the leu was devalued, and even more so in 1929, when Romania entered the worldwide recession. The TNC building burned down on 1 August 1927, possibly after a homecooking mishap involving one of the ushers; the troupe could be seen attempting to rescue props from the flames, including by climbing on the rooftop. The company returned in September, with Zaharia Bârsan's Trandafirii roșii. It and other shows were performed out of Cinema Modern, with the actors dressing and rehearsing in the Craiova Prefecture Building.

The fire coincided with a nation-wide PNL electoral sweep. Shortly after, Dongorozi, who had been supported by the People's Party, was removed from his position; a local newspaper, Știrea, suggested that Boțoiu had undermined, then replaced him. On behalf of the Brătianu cabinet, Constantin Argetoianu immediately pledged 20 million lei for a TNC reconstruction effort, with then-mayor Emanuel Tătărescu promising an additional 5 million; other authorities got involved, and a caretakers' committee was formed (with Argetoianu, Richard Franasovici, Nicolae Titulescu, and Ion G. Duca among the members). As Livescu observes, "there was talk of building a new theater [in Craiova] according to modern plans and requirements. However, no such measures were ever taken." For a while, the company was fully itinerant. It found a temporary home in Timișoara, which had a national theater, but no staff. The Ministry of Arts pledged 10 million lei for it to relocate there during 1927–1928, with Timișoara city hall throwing in an additional 1 million; the terms were not met, and the TNC left after only two months.

Boțoiu's short term was mired in controversy, and, in January 1928, minister Alexandru Lapedatu ordered him to step down. Drăgoescu was invited to resume his position, but declined; Lapedatu's second choice was D. Tomescu, who accepted. As announced in June by Rampa, the TNC was being poorly managed by Tomescu; seven traveling actors, performing in Oltenian towns on behalf of the TNC, were involved in a traffic accident outside Târgu Jiu, and were "barely pulled out alive from the wreckage." According to the same source, the TNC had degraded "beneath any artistic standard", and was effectively tricking its prospective audience with money-grab shows.

Tomescu opened the 1928–1929 season with plays directed by Bumbești. These were Barbu Ștefănescu Delavrancea's historical play, Viforul, with noted performances by Remus Comâneanu, Marioara Crețulescu, N. Dimitriu, Coca Gorgos; and Henri Bernstein's Samson, featuring Nelly Dordea and Stela Ploeșteanu-Poenaru. The troupe still considered other possibilities: in 1929, it formally demanded permission to enter the Kingdom of Yugoslavia and stage shows for the Romanian Serb diaspora. In December 1929, the TNC caretakers reemployed Petre I. Sturdza on a temporary contract. He produced Bjørnstjerne Bjørnson's En fallit, introducing Comâneanu as Berent and Dimitriu as Sannæs. Another long series of conflicts between the TNC and its troupe began in 1930, when actress Ploeșteanu-Poenaru sued her employers; her example was followed in 1933 by Margot Boteanu (now married Poenaru). The institution continued to exist in improvised settings, moving between local cinemas. It used Cinema Modern until early 1932—when the lease expired, central authorities proposed that the company be broken up and reconstituted in Timișoara, which still had no active Romanian theater.

=== Herz interlude ===
TNC troupe c. December 1932, under A. de Herz's management, performing in Sorana, by Herz and Ioan Alexandru Brătescu-Voinești. From the left: Anuța Ștefănescu, Tantzi Benescu, Mitza Jianu-Lobodă, Kuki de Herz, Tantzi Blezu, Remus Comăneanu, Aurel Munteanu, Dem. Psatta

From 1 October 1931, the TNC also had a new manager, the comedian and dramatist A. de Herz. Under his watch, the company began work on new productions, including primarily two that were written and directed by Herz himself—Aripi frânte (1931) and Mărgeluș (1932). Headlining plays included Doamna Ieremia by Iorga—performed just as its author had begun serving as Prime Minister of Romania—and French works such as André Mouëzy-Éon's La Chienne (with Nicolae Velculescu) and André Picard's Kiki (with a guest performer, Tantzi Cutava). Herz also employed Bobescu for Nikolai Evreinov's The Chief Thing. Arcadiu Baculea adapted The Idiot, by Fyodor Dostoevsky. Its director was lambasted by a local critic, who reserved praise for Dordea as Nastasya Filippovna. After visiting Craiova in mid-1932, writer Aurel Savela reported that its theater crew was talented, but that many spectators were non-paying seat-fillers.

Herz presided over a period of poverty and intrigue; according to Massoff, his unruly character did little to help his troupe reach a state of calm, with scandal spilling out into the streets of Craiova. During late 1932, former TNC accountant Eugen Constant was highly critical of the "streetwise" manager, seeing him as incompatible with "the Oltenian psyche". Constant claimed that the institution was excessively promoting German plays, with "nudist displays and libidinous gestures", and also implied that Herz was engaged in fraudulent accounting. As the season opened in November, Romanian Police had to provide protection to Herz and his employees, just as the prosecutor's office was opening an investigation into his management (a deeply flawed one, according to Massoff). Shortly after, the nationalist newspaper Calendarul reported with satisfaction that Herz, a Jewish man, was only surviving in his post because of his government supervisor, Alexandru Mavrodi, who "provides homes to all the con artists, and makes a mockery of our national theaters, to the minorities' enjoyment."

The Timișoara-relocation debate, which had provoked additional public outrage, was by then effectively suspended. At the time, local potentates discovered that headmaster N. Balaban had begun work on an unusually large auditorium at Carol I College. Since the annex was illegal, it was confiscated and assigned to the TNC. The respite ended in 1933, when a new mayor of Craiova canceled the Carol-hall requisition order, forcing the TNC to sign a new contract with Cinema Modern. Herz managed to relocate his actors into Carol Hall for the 1933–1934 season, albeit under a lease. Funds were to be provided by the mayor's office, but it failed to honor its commitment; Balaban, returning as headmaster, demanded that the lease be canceled.

According to Popescu, Herz's political sympathies, which were opposed to the governing PNL, caused the institution to be severely under-budgeted: its yearly funds dropped from 6 to 1.5 million lei between 1933 and 1934. During that interval, the TNC began staging weekly shows in Târgu Jiu, reporting packed halls. Herz and his crew also returned to Timișoara, with a crew that included Comăneanu, Dordea, Leonard Divarius, and Herz's daughter Kuki. They reportedly had great success, in particular with Sorana (co-authored by Herz and Ioan Alexandru Brătescu-Voinești), but also with Der dunkle Punkt, by Gustav Kadelburg, and The Miser, by Molière.

For a while, the TNC continued to stage new plays, as directed by Bobescu: Beaumarchais's Barber of Seville (1934) and Louis Verneuil's Azaïs (1935); these were produced alongside Herz' written-and-directed Omul de zăpadă (also 1935). The 1934–1935 season was unusually short, opening with Aripi frânte, and continuing with Sacha Guitry's L'Illusionniste, with Bernstein's La Griffe, as well as an attempt at reviving the operetta (with M. Choufleuri). Ion Minulescu returned to the TNC for stagings of his own Allegro ma non troppo, using the occasion to lambast Craiovans for their cultural apathy. In late 1934, the actors went on strike and initiated a collective lawsuit, after Herz had not paid their wages for three months. As observed by several authors, this was ultimately a doing of a PNL cabinet. The latter had intentionally delayed payments, ostensibly to punish Herz's acts of insubordination.

Interwar managers
Ștefan Boțoiu

Grigore Drăgoescu

Ion Dongorozi

Petre I. Sturdza

A. de Herz

=== 1935 closure and fascist reestablishment ===
The TNC was shut down by government order on 1 April 1935, leaving the actors unemployed. The official reason cited was "budgetary constrains". The troupe continued to perform for a while, being directed by N. Neamțu-Ottonel in a production of Madame X, by Alexandre Bisson (1936). It afterwards scattered; actresses Boteanu-Poenaru and Maria Burbea-Făgădaru were assigned to the National Theater Cluj. In October 1936, there was a delayed protest of the local intelligentsia, led into battle by Mihail Albu and Constantin Șaban Făgețel; as Popescu writes, these petitioners were animated by "sometimes vehement and extremist" nationalism. The Carol hall, meanwhile, was used for a performance by the touring company of the National Theater Bucharest, in October 1935. It was not assigned back to the school, but was eventually declared unfit for public use after a formal inquiry in 1938. According to Popescu, the decision was political, resulting from Balaban's maneuvers.

The theatrical movement continued during World War II, which began after Romania had begun an experiment with authoritarian rule—with a corporative constitution and a single party, the National Renaissance Front (FRN). At the regime's peak in August 1940, stage director Ion Sava was told by the titular Minister of the Arts, Radu Budișteanu, that the TNC would soon reopen. A ministerial decree on this subject was published in early September, splitting financing between the ministry and Craiova city hall. In a later memoir, George Ciprian claims to have been proposed the position of chairman, which he lost only because Budișteanu made inquiries about his private life. Just days after the decree had come out, the FRN regime crumbled, leaving room for General Ion Antonescu to establish another dictatorship, one more explicitly aligned with Nazi Germany. Initially, he also called upon the fascist Iron Guard, forming a "National Legionary State" (1940–1941). Radu Gyr, who had since joined the Guard, emerged as inspector of theaters, and, in December 1940, made additional efforts to reestablish the TNC—referring to it as the cradle of his own youth. In 1940–1942, another movement to reopen the TNC coalesced around a more senior Craiova intellectual, the historian C. D. Fortunescu; he addressed two petitions to the authorities, one of which comprised a historical overview of the institution.

On 15 August 1942, Antonescu's regime issued a new decree for reestablishing the TNC, and also reinstated Ștefan Boțoiu as manager. The Carol hall was again used, though Antonescu made promises to invest in a "palace of the arts", that would have accommodated the theater as well. The 1942–1943 season only opened on 29 December, with Lucian Blaga's take on the Meșterul Manole myth. In his thank-you message to the authorities, Boțoiu claimed that the hall was "packed-full" with spectators. Nicolae Massim and Traian Ciuculescu were used as stage directors, with George Löwendal and Iosif Vescovi as the set designers. Ciprian also visited, directing there his own play, The Man and His Mule. Burbea-Făgădaru and Boteanu-Poenaru both returned to be part of the regular company; in May 1943, the former was exposed as half-Jewish by the antisemitic journalist Ștefan Panduru, who demanded that she be removed from her job.

During August 1943, the TNB recruited TNC actresses Silvia Fulda and Getta Tudorache for a touring performance with Pământ—by Nicolae Vlădoianu and Soare Z. Soare. In October, the TNC reopened with four premieres. This unusually high number was explained by Capitala daily as caused by Oltenia's social structure: "theater enthusiasts do not match those large numbers we get [in Bucharest]; furthermore, the population of commuters does not yield the attendance numbers required for any productions to achieve a long consecutive run." Massim directed a celebrated rendition of Our Town, by Thornton Wilder, relying on talents such as Fulda, Virginia Bude, and Manu Nedeianu. Capitala newspaper reported this as a great success for Boțoiu, "putting in their place the gossipers who [...] shake the very foundations of the theater". Ciuculescu also garnered good reviews with Visul unei nopți de iarnă, by Tudor Mușatescu, with Nedeianu acclaimed for his contribution as servant Manole. Demetrescu Dan's take on I. L. Caragiale's Conu Leonida and Stormy Night was also on the bill, as a double show. It had lauded performances by Comăneanu and Ovidiu Rocoș.

As Popescu writes, Boțoiu's Antonescian reconversion marked "a particularly difficult political moment, when the two tendencies, that of official politics and that expressed by actors, who wanted to make art, not politics, were increasingly difficult to reconcile". According to later reports, all attempts to protest against Boțoiu's arbitrariness had been stifled by his friendship with a regime potentate, Constantin Vasiliu. Both Antonescu and Vasilescu endorsed Boțoiu during "Oltenia Week" festival of October 1943. They appeared as guests for a TNC staging of Divarius' Liberatorul.

== Communist era ==
=== 1944–1949 transition ===
Shortly after an anti-fascist coup in August 1944 toppled Antonescu and brought Romania under a Soviet military occupation, the political mood changed in rapid strides, with the previously outlawed Romanian Communist Party (PCR) emerging as a powerful player. On 27 October, General Radu Gherghel and his colleagues hosted a TNC gala for the Red Army. Entertainment was provided by the local actors and, on the Soviet side, by Lezginka dancers. Tiberiu Iliescu, who was also editor of a modernist and left-wing magazine, Meridian, had been made TNC chairman on 24 October. He was replacing the already disgraced Boțoiu. Leftist newspapers had come to identify the latter as a "petty dictator", who had replicated Antonescu at a city-level, or, more radically, as a "fascist propagandist" performing services for the Nazis.

Iliescu opened the 1944–1945 season with The Lower Depths. The selection was upheld as a good example by the Union of Patriots' Tribuna Poporului, since it was a "play for the masses". Alexandru Kisilievici won praise as the director, as did actors Fulda and Iancu Economu. In November 1944, Iliescu organized a series of "experimental conferences" at the TNC, inviting Grigore Preoteasa (who discussed Tudor Vladimirescu's modern legacy) and Matei Cristescu (who covered the literary aspects of French Resistance). In April 1945, the journalists at Fapta praised Iliescu for taking a risk with Paul Claudel's L'Annonce faite à Marie, which used Elena Sterienescu in the lead role. In the interview, the chairman informed his public that, should they like it or not, "I will persevere, until Craiova's people will get used to having good things." In his subsequent artistic program, Iliescu sought to combine a classical repertory (comprising Delavrancea, Shakespeare, Shaw, Tolstoy, Gorky, and Alexander Pushkin) with newer works—by Marcel Achard, Karel Čapek, Ilya Ehrenburg, Leonid Leonov, Ayn Rand, and George Mihail Zamfirescu. As he himself recalled in a 1976 interview, they were performed not just on the conventional stages, but also "in factories [and] orphanages."

With time, allegations surfaced that Iliescu was rarely found at his workplace, and that he had done nothing to prevent the stealing of operating suplies, including 153 lightbulbs and much of the carpeting. He was also much resented by his actors. As reported by critic and diarist Valentin Silvestru, by 1946 they were preventing him from even entering his workplace; the Ministry of Arts resorted to sending in another writer, Geo Dumitrescu, to take over all his attributes (initially in a non-official capacity). Iliescu was pushed out by Dumitrescu on 2 November 1946, only preserving his other office, as a ministerial inspector in Oltenia. In his own account, he had to resign due to "small machinations" by people who still functioned as under "the bourgeois regime". An unusually heated competition followed between his prospective replacements. It ended on 22 February 1947, when Romuald Bulfinsky won the appointment.

Bulfinsky's mandate witnessed the full imposition of a Romanian communist regime in early 1948. Immediately after, a trade unions' commission (headlined by Aurel Ion Maican and Velimir Maximilian), staged qualification exams for the theatrical staff; Ciuculescu was given a poor review, having failed to answer some of the more basic questions about stagecraft. In May, the PCR central organ, Scînteia, observed that the closing TNC season had been a disparate collection of classical plays (The Miser), "plays that are critical of the old regime" (Alexandru Kirițescu's Gaițele), and samples "of contemporary-progressive writing for the stage" (Arnaud d'Usseau and James Gow's Deep Are the Roots). Scînteia censured the TNC for also choosing Mircea Ștefănescu's comedy, Micul infern, which stood as a "dangerous [...] eulogy to bourgeois family life." During the summer break, Bulfinsky's troupe, answering a command by the PCR (then known as the "Workers' Party"), toured Oltenia with Gaițele, performing for agricultural cooperatives and workers' unions, in places from Oravița to Băile Govora.

On 21 September 1948, director and writer Marin Iorda lost his chairmanship at the National Theater Iași, and was instead moved to the similar post in Craiova, where Bulfinsky had resigned. Manager Alexandru Dincă, who led the TNC in the 1970s and '80s, described the 1948–1948 season as pioneering "fresh, original playwriting that attempted to present the New Man in all the complexity of the concerns and events he was experiencing." As Dincă notes, such premieres included Lucia Demetrius' Cumpăna and Mihail Davidoglu's Minerii. In early 1949, Iorda himself directed O scrisoare pierdută, for which he adopted the viewpoint of Marxist-Leninism. Iorda had a "creative session" with the agitprop department in Dolj Region, where he described Caragiale's text as an anti-bourgeois fable.

Transitional TNC chairmen, 1944–1945
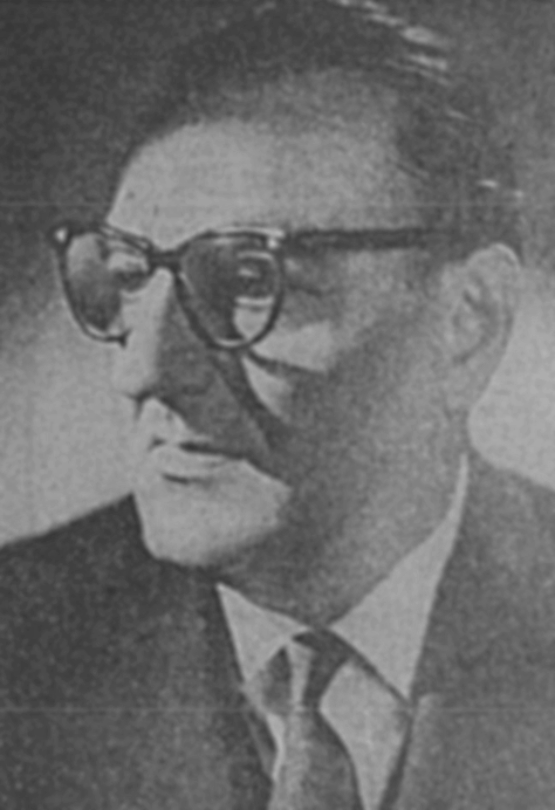
Tiberiu Iliescu

Geo Dumitrescu

Romuald Bulfinsky

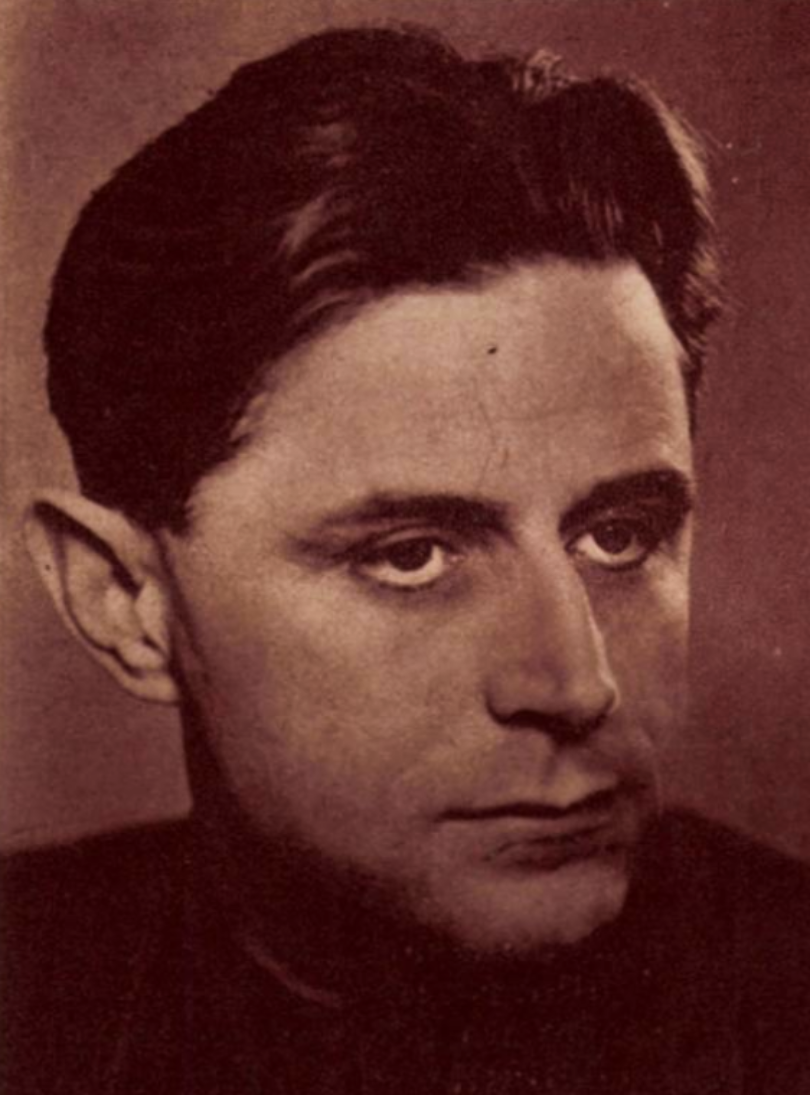
Marin Iorda

=== Early-1950s restructuring ===
Scene from Aurel Baranga's Într'o noapte de vară, TNC production of c. 1953

By April 1950, Iorda had been replaced with Ilie Rizea, who signed up as TNC chairman for an appeal to ban all nuclear weapons. Between 1951 and 1953, Ștefan Bossun of Ramuri, who was also serving as head of the local Writers' Union, worked as the TNC dramaturge. Russian and Soviet plays were now a major component of the program, with one count suggesting that 58 such texts were taken up for production at Craiova between 1946 and 1981. As acknowledged by the local paper, Înainte, in the early 1950s plays were selected to reflect the social messages and aesthetics of socialist realism, and sometimes specifically for their lambasting of "American imperialism".

In 1950–1951, the program included Maria Banuș's Ziua cea Mare (with which the TNC toured Coțofenii din Față and Maglavit), Boris Lavrenyov's Golos Ameriki (performed in front of Jiu Valley coal-miners), and Oleksandr Korniychuk's V stepakh Ukrayiny. O scrisoare pierdută was also part of the regular program, being shown for the public right before the local elections of December 1950. Communist gatherings continued to be hosted at the TNC, as with a March 1951 symposium of the Democratic Women's Union. Two Oltenian women farmers spoke there about their extended visit to Soviet Georgia. In June, the TNC was running Lozan Strelkov's Razuznavane, as part of a national program to showcase authors from the various people's democracies (in this case, Bulgaria).

The TNC held a Caragiale festival for that author's birth centennial in early 1952; it was followed shortly by Nikolai Gogol's death centennial, for which it staged The Government Inspector. Also then, it was producing Davidoglu's Cetatea de foc and Arkadi Perventsev's Mladshiy partnyor, as well as a string of musical plays for open-air performances—with the Craiovan Philharmonic as a partner. It continued touring, performing with Howard Fast's Thirty Pieces of Silver in Caracal during July 1952. In October, it marked the nation-wide "Week of Soviet Theater" by staging Huseyn Mukhtarov's Allanyň maşgalasy. By 1953, the company had been fully integrated with the official trends of "fighting against formalism", as one of the two venues which staged Aurel Baranga's communist work, Într'o noapte de vară. In mid-1954, it announced that it would tour 35 Romanian cities with Krechinsky's Wedding, by Aleksandr Sukhovo-Kobylin. The 1954–1955 season opened with Baranga's Mielul turbat and Aleksei Arbuzov's Tanya.

TNC anniversary in 1955: George Ciprian (on the right) shaking hands with Remus Comăneanu, as Madeleine Nedeianu watches

During early 1956, the TNC, chaired by Tiberiu Penția, submitted to sessions of criticism and self-criticism under the auspices of an "artists' council". Its inspectors argued that the company was overall commendable, "eager to raise [to] the great tasks set before it at present", but that the plays were often "formalistic" and hardly watchable (council members refused to even sit though TNC rehearsals of Konstantin Simonov's Istoriya odnoy lyubvi and I. Marinescu's Pățaniile bobocului Mac-Mac). Dramaturge Ștefan Balint was singled out for having failed to diversify the program. As the council noted, Horia Lovinescu, with his Citadela sfărîmată, was the only Romanian author being produced, and no Craiovan playwrights had even been invited to write for their local stage.

Such lines of criticism were also brought up by director Sorana Coroamă, who observed that the TNC had decided to enter the Decade of Original Playwriting Festival of May 1956 with Virgil Stoenescu and Octavian Sava's light comedy, Nota zero la purtare, adding "gestural vulgarity" to an already undemanding text. As announced in August 1957 by its actor Remus Comăneanu, the TNC was promised its own "monumental quarters"—though it had to wait for the Philharmonic to get its own. Critic Eugen Atanasiu commended the TNC's improvements for the 1956–1957 season, when Ion Olteanu was called in to do The Devil's Disciple, by Shaw (Atanasiu did not however praise Sterienescu and the other actors, who could not rise to Olteanu's "analytical" demands).

=== Between Mugur and Gheorghiu ===
Innovation was apparent in early 1957, when the newly recruited director Vlad Mugur registered a major hit with Oscar Wilde's Bunbury, which was also performed in Bucharest. Reviewed in Scînteia as a pleasant and "honest" show, it brought together Comăneanu and a host of recent graduates from the Drama Institute—Silvia Popovici, Victor Rebengiuc, Dumitru Rucăreanu. As noted almost 40 years later by critic Dumitru Chirilă, Mugur's work at the TNC had made the institution "one of the major hotspots in Romanian theatrical life". Mugur himself had initiated the influx of young talents, also bringing in Gheorghe Cozorici, Amza Pellea, Eliza Plopeanu, Constantin Rauțchi; as well as director Dinu Cernescu and Radu Penciulescu, alongside stage designer Constantin Piliuță and Ion Popescu-Udriște.

Cernescu took pride in having helped initiate a "brutal" awakening of "sleepy and backward" Craiova. He noted that the institution, managed by Manu Nedeianu, was the home of talented, but time-ravaged actors, such as Comăneanu, Boteanu-Poenaru, Ovidiu Rocoș, as well as Nedeianu and his wife Madeleine. In March 1957, the TNC premiered Lichnoye delo, by Alexander Stein. Reviewer Petre Ștefan applauded this as a "daring" and "difficult" endeavor, which initiated introspection about political repressions; he praised Pellea as "the communist engineer Khlebnikov, expelled from the party following dishonest machinations by the careerist Poludin."

Silvia Popovici and Victor Rebengiuc in a scene from Bunbury (directed by Vlad Mugur in early 1957)

Gheorghe Cozorici as Tudor Vladimirescu in Mihnea Gheorghiu's eponymous play (directed by Dinu Cernescu in December 1957)

More steps toward a national-and-peasant-themed repertory followed. During the 1957–1958 season, the TNC premiered a work by the Oltenian dramatist Mihnea Gheorghiu, depicting the Oltenian rebels of 1821, and eponymously titled after Tudor Vladimirescu. It was welcomed in the official press as a fulfilment of a cultural program promoting socialist patriotism. Cozorici was celebrated as Tudor, but the production was panned for its excessive caricatures of the boyars (one of whom was portrayed by Comăneanu). Cernescu, who directed it, called the text "rather boring and pretentious", suggesting that it was Gheorghiu's vanity project. The supply of patriotic plays was increased with Baranga's Arcul de Triumf and Nicolae Tăutu's homage to Ecaterina Teodoroiu. Such productions alternated with renewed borrowing from Soviet communist literature: in early 1958, Mugur premiered Vsevolod Vishnevsky's Optimistic Tragedy, with Jules Perahim as set designer and Olga Tudorache as The Woman Commissar. The same director relied on Cozorici for the first postwar performance of Hamlet in all of Romania. Petre Dragu, who was serving as dramaturge, reported that both plays had unusually "substandard" playbills. He blamed himself and the "chaotic labor" that other troupe members had forced on him.

In early 1959, Cernescu set up a TNC "experimental studio", describing it as in a "continuous struggle against those who [...] reject innovative pursuits—namely, those pursuits that elevate socialist realism to its absolute peaks." The company returned to open-air shows, with Cernescu directing Boteanu-Poenaru and others on a raft anchored at Nicolae Romanescu Park; the selected text was Le baruffe chiozzotte, by Carlo Goldoni. Cernescu also did an adaptation of The Good Soldier Švejk, which premiered in February 1959. It earned him attention in Socialist Czechoslovakia, allowing him to attend the Karlovy Vary Festival. In August 1959, the TNC and the Philharmonic collaborated on Filaret Barbu's operetta, Ana Lugojana, headlined by tenor Claudiu Moldovan.

The 1959–1960 season included Mugur's take on Pygmalion, introducing Rodica Tapalagă as Eliza, and Valentina Balogh's production of The Young Guard (shown during the third all-Romanian competition of young creators, where it was downvoted as too aestheticized). A 1962 production of Bertold Brecht's Arturo Ui brought in good reviews for director Radu Miron and the two main actors—Nae Floca-Acileni, Ion Pavlescu. The Cernescu group had irreconcilable differences with the Nedeianus, and was slowly pushed into leaving Craiova. As Cernescu recounts, he and his colleagues only abandoned their posts after being threatened with arrest. In one of his more detailed memoirs, he reports that he, Cozorici and Pellea were actually imprisoned for a while, in an attempt to frame them as homosexuals.

=== Sîrbu's arrival ===
During the mid-to-late 1960s, when Nicolae Ceaușescu became leader of the PCR and initiated liberalization measures, the TNC was largely defined by the activities of its dramaturge, Ion Dezideriu Sîrbu—though Sîrbu himself always regarded Craiova as a "most terrifying and absurd" place of banishment. He arrived there in August 1964, after a decade in which he had been sacked from academia, imprisoned, then socially marginalized by the regime, only accepting the job as a last resort. As such, his literary breakthrough was delayed past the point of de-Stalinization. Additionally, Sîrbu was kept under constant watch by the Securitate to 1969, and again in 1974–1986, being sometimes "invited in" and chided about his anti-communist opinions. He was however allowed to write articles on behalf of the TNC. In his 1966 overview, Sîrbu expressed pride in the TNC's ability to maintain its veteran actors, its "undulating history" notwithstanding. He nominated Boteanu-Poenaru, who was readying to celebrate her golden jubilee as a Craiova actress, and Nedeianu, who was entering his 40th year.

Projects of the period included workshops with readings from rediscovered classics such as Costache Faca, a section of repertory plays, and seasonal tours of other Oltenian theaters. At the peak of the 1964–1965 season, critic Mihai Florea commended the TNC for embracing fantasy and creativity in its new version of The Man and His Mule, in J. B. Priestley's Mr. Kettle and Mrs. Moon, in Alexandru Mirodan's Șeful sectorului suflete, as well as in Guilherme Figueiredo's The Fox and the Grapes. He commended directors Balogh and Georgeta Tomescu, stage designer Viorel Penișoară-Stegaru, as well as the newly recruited actors, including Emil Boroghină. Sîrbu himself additionally observed that the "fidgety and unstable" Craiovans had been elevating their tastes, while preserving their interest in "strong" or "total" plays, rather than the more subtle texts. To support this, he referred to the TNC's "Shakespeare Week", which had focused on Othello, as well as to new successes with Tartuffe and Paul Everac's Simple coincidențe. In tandem, he noted, the public was no longer as enthusiastic about tried-and-tested crowd-pleasers (such as Gaițele and Victor Eftimiu's Cocoșul negru).

In April 1967, Ceaușescu and other high-ranking PCR activists toured Oltenia alongside their guest Todor Zhivkov, who was serving as Bulgarian Premier. Both communist leaders attended a special show at the TNC, which consisted largely of folk dances from either of their cultures. Meanwhile, the program had been expanded with Barbu Ștefănescu Delavrancea's Viforul—as Chirilă writes, it and Othello were ample proof that Oltenians now had "a solid theatrical culture and a homogenous ensemble." The TNC also introduced Oltenians to plays by Euripides (Alcestis), Ben Jonson (Volpone), Lope de Vega (La villana de Getafe), and Federico García Lorca (The House of Bernarda Alba). The experimental drive continued in early 1968, when Penișoară-Stegaru created distinctly modernist settings for Gorky's Egor Bulychev (Petre Sava Băleanu of the Romanian Television was invited in to direct). Sîrbu's play Frunze care ard, which embraced Marxist humanism, was also performed at the time, with Balogh directing; its line about universal brotherhood as embedded within "a communist's personality" was reportedly much appreciated by Craiova's workers, one of whom quoted it at a PCR rally. The troupe performed with Othello and Alexandru Voitin's Procesul Horia in Yugoslavia, reportedly winning glowing reviews for Pavlescu and Eva Pătrășcanu.

TNC actors Elena Gurgulescu and Valeriu Dogaru in Nu sînt turnul Eiffel (1969)

Before the summer break of 1968, the TNC also hosted Cătălina Buzoianu's directorial debut, with Miss Julie, from a text by August Strindberg. During the 1968–1968 season, it was mainly involved in promoting local playwrights, and redid Nota zero la purtare, with Gheorghe Jora directing. In tandem, it relied on Valeriu Moisescu for a production of Ecaterina Oproiu's romantic comedy, Nu sînt turnul Eiffel. It was celebrated by Contemporanul magazine as "one of the best" versions of that play, for being paced "à bout de souffle" and "well-acted". The institution allowed Moisescu to do his own version of Caragiale's D-ale carnavalului, remarked by critics for its pious closeness to the original text, as well for singer Tudor Gheorghe's role at Catindatul. Gheorghe was additionally well-liked for his solo recitals at the TNC, taking a national prize of the theaters' syndicate in December 1969.

=== Early 1970s overhaul ===
Upon taking over as chairman, Alexandru Dincă pushed for more Romanian playwrights to be added; overall, between 1944 and 1984, "we have brought 350 plays to the stage, with over 200 of these belonging to the corpus of contemporary Romanian drama". Despite efforts he made to reach a young audience, spectators from that age group were reportedly in short supply; criticism of Craiova's youth intensified after the TNC's own stagehand, Adrian Stanache, was put on trial as the leader of a pilferers' gang. The company was at the time performing with Sîrbu's own Arca bunei speranțe, a biblical parable, in August 1970; this was not a local production, but rather done by the touring actors of Teatrul Tineretului (with noted performances by Cornel Nicoară, Carmen Galin, and Valentin Uritescu). The text was tame in terms of cultural dissidence, with no hints about Sîrbu's rejection of communism—it was thus ignored by both the PCR and its critics, leaving the author to enjoy only a regional fame. In early 1971, Mugur directed Zodia taurului, which was Mihnea Gheorghiu's updated play about the 1821 events—with Valeriu Dogaru as a lauded Tudor.

Sîrbu reported that construction of a new TNC building was already under way at the time of his writing, adding: "[this] symbol of a great victory in Romanian art will have not a single curtain, not one projector, not one armchair from the old theater, but it will still hold in it the spirit of sacrifice, greatness and enthusiasm of those countless founding-figures". At the PCR's Tenth Congress, held in 1969, a resolution was passed specifically mandating for the building to be fully budgeted. The competition was won by architect Alexandru Iotzu, whose project was done with input from architect-director Liviu Ciulei. Iotzu's work had an enduring popularity, which was brought up in a 2019 overview by architect Horia Mihai Coman: "In spite of its communist origins, the theatre building has earned its status as one of Craiova's landmarks. Its success can be (quite) easily attributed to the qualities that stem from its architectural aesthetics." Journalist C. Isac described the new conditions as follows:

The huge stage can be adapted to any need, extending into the hall, reducing itself, as per any requests made by the creators of shows; thanks to the superior technique that went into its construction, it lends itself to all of the established types of stages: Italian, Elizabethan, or arena. The projectors, in multiple arrangements, can create whole sets; the control and adjustment systems allow countless uses of light and luminescent effects, and the electro-acoustic installation allows a varied range of sound effects. Elegant cabins, elevators, mechanisms of the latest type—all are in support of the artists who, in turn, give all their talent to the audience. Seen from the stage, the hall seems like an immense rotunda to which the paneling and carpets give a distinguished solemnity. [The TNC has] 700 comfortable, generously spaced armchairs, light filtered through the beams of a deep ceiling, [and] vast foyers [...].

Scene from Gheorghe Robu's Locul tău sub soare, on its September 1973 premiere at the TNC. With Iosefina Stoia and (on the far right) Remus Mărgineanu

A former TNC actor, Amza Pellea arrived in to take over as chairman in 1973—but did so on condition that he not appear on stage. The new building was opened in spring 1973 with Alexandru Davila's Vlaicu Vodă, and with Sîrbu's own A doua față a medaliei (a fast-paced comedy, moderately praised for Pavlescu's acting and Moisescu's direction). Shortly after, it hosted a nation-wide Maria Tănase Festival of traditional music. In opening the 1973–1974 season, Pellea chose Locul tău sub soare, a debut play by prosecutor Gheorghe Robu (defined by Robu himself as a commentary on "socialism [as] a new humanity").

Other offerings on the Pellea program included Caragiale (with a reprisal of O scrisoare pierdută), Everac (Viața e ca un vagon), Leon Kruczkowski (Śmierć gubernatora), Arthur Miller (The Crucible), Mihail Sebastian (Ultima oră), and Sophocles (Oedipus Rex). In June 1974, the troupe appeared at Bucharest's Teatrul Mic with Marina Bașta and Emil Boroghină's show, combining various folk ballads into a single narrative; musical numbers were done by Gheorghe Zamfir.

=== Cornișteanu's breakthrough ===
In March 1975, Tomescu staged Gian Franco Venè and Roberto Pallavicini's political play, Referendum, in a critically lauded version, with as Nicolae Radu as Walter Reder. From May, the TNC was complimented by a "T 94" studio, which linked it directly to the amateur theater scene, used for recruiting new talents and testing out ideas. Dincă had by then returned as chairman, replacing Pellea. His actors never took a break, with the TNC hosting several new shows in summer 1975—including Dumitru Radu Popescu's Acești îngeri triști, which marked a directorial debut by Mircea Cornișteanu, and a recital from Edith Piaf's memoirs, by Anca Ledunca. New plays entering production included Leonid Leonov's Metel and Gheorghiu's Capul. Gheorghiu took pride in noting that his text, which brought up Michael the Brave's sacrifice, was met with "a spontaneous patriotic demonstration", whereby "the entire audience joined the actors in singing Eroi au fost, eroi sunt încă".

In December 1975, the TNC became the first, and for a while the only, theatrical institution to be granted the Meritul Cultural decoration, as awarded by Ceaușescu himself. In his second term as chairman, Dincă expanded on traditional policies that made the TNC a regional theater of Oltenia—with season-long performances in smaller cities and towns, as well as in the industrial areas of the Jiu Valley. He took pride in noting that he recruited amateurs, who were then professionalized at the Drama Institute and returned to become permanent fixtures at the TNC. Tudor Gheorghe recalled of this period:

I am nostalgic, truly, for the roads we used to travel, for the plays we used to perform at Segarcea, Calafat, Băilești, Vânju Mare. That's because a unique and almost unrepeatable phenomenon took place: after each show, [the local authorities] would, of course, slaughter a sheep, pull out some wine, and a thing would happen that can no longer happen—an agape, a lovable kind of partying among all of us...

Experiments alternated with a revival of A. de Herz's boulevardier writings; in 1976, Balogh directed a new version of Omul de zăpadă, seen by critic Ionuț Niculescu as "a pleasant surprise". Later that season, Balogh directed Ledunca and a female-dominated cast in Ecaterina Oproiu's Interviu. Drawing a comparison with the parallel staging at Bulandra Theater, columnist Virgil Munteanu referred to Balogh's version as "tame". In January 1977, the TNC marked Caragiale's 125th birthday with a festival that brought in troupes from across Romania and endured as a seasonal event. Dincă also remained committed to Gheorghiu's style of communist plays, showcasing his Patetica 77 in the Cîntarea României festival of 1977. For the 1977–1978 season, the TNC received good reviews for Cornișteanu , who did Teodor Mazilu's Sărbătoare princiară and Stanislav Stratiev's Roman Bath, as well as for Tomescu (directing Bașta in Osvaldo Dragún's Heroica de Buenos Aires). Balogh chose Fata procurorului, a political text by Silvia Roșca; this production was panned by Ion B. Vlad of Ramuri, who called it a throwback to "the infancy of 'socialist realism'": "the artificially-staged situations, the lack of all coherence in action, and the schematic nature of the characters suffocate the very idea of dramatic literature".

Balogh continued to have bad reviews in the 1978–1979, when she worked from an adaptation of Dinu Săraru's novel, Clipa. Critic Paul Tutungiu argued that this production had unwittingly made communist heroes look like parvenus. She was praised during the next season, when she did Everac's Un pahar cu sifon: as noted by columnist Constantin Radu-Maria, she and her lead, Leni Pințea, correctly identified the nuances in a complex text. Aso then, Remus Mărgineanu won Tutungiu's acclaim for his directorial take on Aleksei Arbuzov's Zhestokie igry. The same critic was impressed by Cornișteanu's return with A treia țeapă, by Marin Sorescu—with a physically demanding part of Mărgineanu, as the impaled Turk, and an unusually grave Tudor Gheorghe, as Vlad Țepeș. In January 1980, the play and its director took top prizes at the Festival of Historical Drama, hosted by the TNC itself.

=== Early 1980s: dissent and conformity ===
Dogaru (center) with Anca Ledunca and Petre Gheorghiu-Dolj, in Dario Fo's Accidental Death of an Anarchist, as directed by Valentina Balogh

Cornișteanu returned in 1980–1981 for another well-reviewed show, with Horia Lovinescu's Jocul vieții și al morții în deșertul de cenușă (where Tudor Gheorghe played Cain to Dogaru's Abel). Balogh made her own TNC comeback with Dario Fo's Accidental Death of an Anarchist. It earned accolades for the central duo, Dogaru and Petre Gheorghiu-Dolj, the former of whom was crowned best male actor at the 1981 festival in Brașov. The farcical side of the program was completed by Mihai Duțescu's Anticamera, which had Boroghină and Mărgineanu in comedic roles, and later by Tudor Popescu's Jolly Joker, done under Balogh's direction. In March 1981, the TNC toured Socialist Czechoslovakia with well-received productions of Caragiale (O scrisoare pierdută) and Oldřich Daněk (Dva na koni, jeden na oslu). Craiova iself continued to host Soviet plays and Soviet–Romanian cultural events; in late 1981, while staging Valeria Vrublevskaya's Katedra, the TNC was visited by Alexander Grigoryan of the Yerevan Russian Theater. In early 1982, that institution hosted Cornișteanu and the Craiova actors for stagings of Aurel Baranga's Interesul general.

Late-1982 productions included Theodor Mănescu's Politica. Directed by Cornișteanu with T 94 input, and carried by Gheorghiu-Dolj as the lead, it shed a critical light on the radicalism of 1950s communists. Cornișteanu sought to break out of the allowed targets of criticism by staging Sorescu's Există nervi. It had unofficial viewings that were also attended by members of the public; these were ended abruptly by the PCR official, Miu Dobrescu, who described as an attack on the regime's ideology. The issue was mentioned by Sorescu himself in a 1983 interview:

I have simply lost the will to write. It has been a year since a local screening blocked Mircea Cornișteanu's staging of my play, Există nervi, at the National Theater in Craiova—an act that practically broke the hand with which I reached to hold my pen. An air of suspicion floats around; the distrust that certain officials harbor toward all living playwrights is so thick you could cut it with a knife. Distrust. Like a fog.

Instead, the TNC centered its season on Aldo Nicolaj's psychological drama, Farfalla... Farfalla..., done by Mărgineanu. It impressed critic Radu Anton Roman as "a miniature sketch, short-winded yet razor-sharp, a delicate and almost flawless siderography." For Caragiale's birthday in early 1983, Cornișteanu took episodes from the dramatist's correspondence, and glued them together as a show. The 1983–1984 program featured Cristian Hadji-Culea's production of Valeriu Anania's mythopoeia, Greul Pămîntului. Writer Adrian Dohotaru rated it as "one of this season's major events", with its few shortcomings "stem[ming] from a text that is dramaturgically dense, albeit admirable in its atmosphere, poetry, and dreamlike quality". Also then, Boroghină took up Polen pe insulă—which was Carmen Firan's debut as a dramatist, as well as Tamara Popescu's first major role. In early 1984, Cornișteanu had his own take on D-ale carnavalului, with treasured contributions by Gheorghiu-Dolj, Mirela Cioabă, Iosefina Stoia, and Vladimir Juravle.

While setting itself the goal of staging all Caragiale plays (including in modern retellings), the TNC became involved with the nationwide celebrations marking the ruby jubilee of the 1944 anti-fascist coup. As Dincă indicated, there was a special program of shows marking this occasion: Sîrbu's Seară de taină ("depicting of the insurrectional struggles that occurred in Craiova during the glory days of August 1944"), Mănescu's Politica, Duțescu's Fotografii mărite, and Tudor Gheorghe's patriotic recital, Aceasta este țara mea.

During early 1985, Cornișteanu was showcasing Ion Druță's Svyataya Svyatykh—journalist Victor Parhon noted that the version was technically accomplished, but "a certain soulful thrill was missing", not least of all because the Moldavian dialect had been discarded. The title also had to be changed, to omit its mystical references (which Ceaușescu's censors now frowned upon). Critics praised Boroghină, who, in the 1985–1986 season, mounted Mihail Sebastian's Jocul de-a vacanța; they were additionally impressed by the cast, including Dogaru and Valer Dellakeza. Cioabă impressed critics as the protagonist in D. R. Popescu's Paznicul de la depozitul de nisip, as directed by Mihai Manolescu. Manolescu also handled Caragiale's tragedy Năpasta (with Tudor Gheorghe using an unprecedented angle on the main character), as well as Sîrbu's Iarna lupului cenușiu and Antonio Mattiuzzi Collalto's Tre gemelli veneziani—the latter of which received mixed reviews.

=== Final Ceaușescu years ===
Diana Gheorghian and Tudor Gheorghe in Dumitru Radu Popescu and Silviu Purcărete's Piticul din grădina de vară, during a May 1989 tour in Bucharest (shortly before performances were banned)

The TNC cultural agenda diversified during the late 1980s. From March 1986, T 94 reopened as a "poetry studio", co-hosted by Ramuri, and showcasing Sorescu's texts. In November of that year, the TNC main stage hosted a rock concert, with Iris as the core attraction. Plays taken up at the time included Dina Cocea's Familia, as directed by Manolescu. Pințea, described as that show's pivot, was also distinguished nationally for her one-woman recital, Mai departe de vis. The TNC opened in 1987–1988 with a revamped A treia țeapă, replacing Manolescu's take on Victor Ion Popa's Mușcata din fereastră, which had flopped. Pințea starred in W. Somerset Maugham's Theatre, taking the national prize for best actress. By then, T 94 had an autonomous program, with texts by authors such as Robert Anderson, Alexander Gelman, and Silvia Kerim.

During the final stages of 1987, the TNC was a participant in the PCR's outreach efforts, staging Titus Popovici's Puterea și adevărul for the workers at Oltcit and ITMA factories, as well as, on its home stage, a musical show called Hymn of Praise to the Socialist Homeland. Boroghină took over as TNC chairman in February 1988, and, as historian Doina Modolea observes, immediately began testing the censors' vigilance. Three TNC directors were featured, each with his own daring production: Cornișteanu, who redid Sîrbu's Arca bunei speranțe; Aureliu Manea, with Anton Chekhov's Uncle Vanya; and, "above all", Hadji-Culea, with his new version of Teodor Mazilu's Mobilă și durere. The TNC toured Bucharest several times in 1988, with a set of "representative productions", initially including Mobilă și durere as well as Ion Băieșu's comedy, Preșul. It returned in December with A treia țeapă, to widespread acclaim.

A new arrival, Silviu Purcărete, took on D. R. Popescu's Piticul din grădina de vară, premiering it on 27 March (World Theater Day) 1989; Tudor Gheorghe had the lead role, as a soothsaying imbecile, while Ana Ciontea appeared as a political prisoner. The effort was initially appreciated by cultural officials, with Purcărete taking the first prize at Cântarea României 1989, where Pințea was also voted in as best actress. Overall, Purcărete had reused a standard communist text by making into a dog whistle about the regime's overextension, with hints about the recent Brașov rebellion. These were eventually picked up by the PCR leadership, who banned the play and initiated an investigation. As Modola notes, Boroghină only evaded imprisonment after the veteran communist actor, Radu Beligan, spoke in his favor.

Ilie Gheorghe and Tudor Gheorghe in Marin Sorescu's play, Vărul Shakespeare, on its 1990 premiere at the TNC, with Mircea Cornișteanu directing

The attempted clampdown was shortly followed by the Romanian Revolution of 1989, which toppled communism. Immediately after these events, the Union of Theatrical Professionals (UNITER) granted its top prizes to Uncle Vanya and Piticul din grădina de vară, proclaiming Purcărete as the best director of 1989. The TNC's earliest contributions in post-communist culture include a January 1990 conference on "Us and European Consciousness", where Andrei Bantaș drew comparisons between Shakespeare and Mihai Eminescu—with recitals provided by Boroghină, Dogaru, and Pințea. In March, the season reopened with Vărul Shakespeare, done as another collaboration between Cornișteanu and Sorescu. The 1990–1991 season was inaugurated with Edward Albee's Who's Afraid of Virginia Woolf?, with Cornișteanu directing and Beligan "impeccable in the role of George."

== Post-1989 ==
=== Purcărete's stardom ===
In late 1990, the TNC went on tour in the Moldavian SSR, with a playbill that included Uncle Vanya, Piticul, Mobilă și durere, and Albee's play (but not also Preșul). Early the next year, British director Faynia Williams directed a four-man TNC crew (including Tudor Gheorghe and Ilie Gheorghe) in a rendition of The Brothers Karamazov, adapted for the stage by Richard Crane. In August, Purcărete took a critics' prize at the Edinburgh International Festival, for a show combining Ubu Roi and Macbeth. On its return to Craiova for the 1991–1992 season, the cast was joined by Ștefan Iordache, who described the TNC as "an island", where he intended to live until his eventual retirement. Hadji-Culea likewise returned to the city, staging Pragul albastru, which was also the tenth of Sîrbu's plays to be performed at the TNC; Tudor Gheorghe and Dellakeza appeared therein as embodiments of peasant life in the Apuseni Mountains. The institution celebrated Felix Aderca's centennial, in November 1991, by putting on his Muzică pentru balet. Directed by Ioan Ieremia, it was mainly a satire directed at the Iron Guard's antisemitism.

Purcărete continued as the star director, obtaining another international success with Titus Andronicus—lauded for Iordache's "withdrawn but untamed" Titus, it was also shown in 1992 at the Panasonic Globe Theatre in Tokyo. Titus Andronicus also took four UNITER awards for 1992, including one for best show and another one for best debut, going to Ozana Oancea. During 1993, Purcărete took his actors on tour with Ubu–Macbeth, Titus, and an adaptation of Phaedra, with spotlights at TransAmériques, the Holland Festival, and the Viennese Festwochen. In September, Titus Andronic was showcased at the Melbourne International Arts Festival, with members of the troupe recording dialogues and fragments of Romanian poetry on 2000FM.

As observed by cultural journalist Dorin Popa, Purcărete and Bucharest's Andrei Șerban were the only two Romanian directors to reach world fame in the post-revolutionary quinquennial. The company continued to put up other productions, with national or international success. In early 1994, Watermans Arts Centre hosted a TNC troupe, directed by Daniela Peleanu, with Harold Pinter's Caretaker. At home, Tudor Gheorghe headlined the "Oltenian rhapsodists" festival on the TNC main stage. Hadji-Culea adapted George Orwell and Peter Hall's Animal Farm into another TNC production, set to music by Nicu Alifantis. Critic Natalia Stancu praised the cast (including Dellakeza, Ion Colan, Ilie Gheorghe, and Natașa Raab) for its "precision and fantasy". Critic Val Condurache argued that the show was entirely ignored by the community, a sign that Boroghină had exhausted his competence. Other authors similarly described the production as "dated" or "expired".

Ștefan Iordache and fellow TNC actors in a touring performance of Titus Andronicus (1993)

In November 1994, on the heels of Titus Andronicus, the TNC inaugurated an annual "Craiova Shakespeare Festival". Ieremia had his directorial return in early 1995, choosing Sorescu's Iona. An acclaimed production, it had Ilie Gheorghe in the title role; Stancu described its "ingenious staging solutions" as "worthy of a Silviu Purcărete". It and Titus Andronicus were presented at that year's Singapore Festival. Ieremia also did George Astaloș's O masă pe cinste—seen by a Timopolis newspaper columnist as "a backdrop for a string of gags designed to put you in a good mood". In early 1996, Purcărete secured more distinction with Danaïdes, a multimedia adaption from Aeschylus. It immediately took an award from the Romanian critics' association, being hailed by them as "Europe's best show of the decade". In a contemporary article, author Carmen Firan observed that the troupe was practically absent from Craiova, being in permanent abroad, and that this had come to irritate local theatergoers "who feel frustration over losing their own theater". She also noted:

Reviewing such a production becomes practically impossible; mere references to staging technology are simply insufficient to convey what is constantly unfolding on screen and stage. [Purcărete's show is] an extraordinary adventure of contemporary theater, unique not only in Romania.

=== Late 1990s apex and crisis ===
The 1996–1997 season debuted with political controversies tied to the parallel general elections. Ion Iliescu, who was the incumbent President of Romania as well as the Social Democratic candidate, found himself heckled after attending a TNC show; the incident led to a brawl between his partisans and supporters of the rival Democratic Convention. After the CDR's upset, Boroghină was challenged by Ion Caramitru, the new Minister of Culture, who demanded that all theatrical managers pass a qualification exam—a requirement that Boroghină regarded as insulting. The institution was expanding its pool of directors and actors. Boroghină recruited Gábor Tompa for another Hamlet, which won national awards for both the production and its two leads, Adrian Pintea and Mihai Constantin. The TNC also staged the world premiere of Harding Lemay's From a Dark Land, done by an American director-in-residence, Tom Ferriter. Tania Filip was both the translator and the star of the play, with Lemay personally attending her performances.

In March 1997, the TNC marked Sorescu's recent death with a staging of his Matca; Peleanu was called in to direct. In May, Titus Andronicus resumed its international tours, this time alongside Pinocchio in Venice—using TNC actors, directed by Robert Delamere, and a text by Edward Carey. During mid-1998, Purcărete and Boroghină were doing Oresteia as a multinational collaboration, also involving the Barbican Centre, the Théâtre de l'Union, and various cultural funds; Maia Morgenstern joined the troupe, as Clytemnestra. The TNC's international reputation was again criticized as wasteful, this time by Tudor Gheorghe. He spoke about the TNC's looming decline, arguing that the internationally touring section of the troupe was holding on to three famous plays, after which it would return to a public that barely remembered it. Another issue, which was carried in the national press, was that the actors still had very modest living conditions, with 15 of them living out of their dressing rooms at the TNC building.

For Eugène Ionesco's Killer, which premiered in January 1998, the TNC relied on director Theodor Cristian Popescu, and on Valentin Mihali as an acclaimed Berenger. During the next season, Boroghină reinforced home performances by adding Mihai Măniuțiu, with a "radically dynamic" take on Timon of Athens—well-liked for the interplay between Ilie Gheorghe and Dellakeza. It was taken, again alongside Titus Andronicus, to the Gdańsk Shakespeare Festival, taking an institutional award presented by Theatrum Gedanense. Meanwhile, Peleanu did a celebrated version of Sorescu's Paracliserul, centered on Dogaru, while Constantin Dicu directed Careul, a comedy by the Craiova physician Constantin Voiculescu, which had mixed reviews. In 1999, Vlad Mugur returned to the TNC, after a 43-year absence from that stage, with The Servant of Two Masters, by Carlo Goldoni. The show, centered on Iosefina Stoia, was seen by columnist Maria Laiu as "refined" and "almost flawless".

In mid-to-late 1999, the TNC was hit by the Vasile Cabinet's austerity policies. In that context, the Ministry of Culture considered handing it over to the Dolj County administration. Several actors presented their resignations in September, but still appeared on stage at the October preview of Luigi Pirandello's Right You Are. Directed by Mugur on an austerity budget, it was noted by critic Ion Parhon for its good acting, including by Dellakeza and by Mugur's wife Magda. It and the Goldoni production earned him a national prize at the UNITER gala in April 2000. A deepened crisis was averted between these days, with government having agreed to allocate 2.2 billion lei in emergency funding. Boroghină stepped down as TNC chairman in July 2000, though he remained involved with the Shakespeare Festival. Ilarion Ștefănescu was made interim manager, and decided to open the 2000–2001 season with mainly older shows by Purcărete, going back to Ubu, and Mugur. The latter was also included with a new production: Goldoni's Women's Gossip, with Dellakeza and a debuting Luiza Cocora.

=== Cornișteanu's management ===
Tudor Gheorghe in concert at Craiova, June 2007

Mircea Cornișteanu took over management in late 2000, announcing that the TNC was returning to a program comedy. This was inaugurated by Éric Assous and Pierre Sauvil's Portefeuille, which he directed himself. In Pitești, the TNC and Alexandru Davila Theater also co-premiered a show about Mihai Eminescu's muse, Veronica Micle (played by Mirela Cioabă). During mid-2001, the TNC hosted Petre Bokor's adaptation of The Complete Works of William Shakespeare (Abridged), which earned accolades for its three-actor crew. Also then, Cornișteanu attracted notice by returning to Dumitru Radu Popescu's works, with a world premiere of Regii pețitori. It received both encouragement, as "interesting" and "daring", and poor reviews (as combining Popescu's "old literary obsessions" with a "fear of the helplessness of old age"). Late that year, Cornișteanu did a noted version of Matei Vișniec's Frumoasa călătorie a urșilor panda, with Mihali and Romanița Ionescu. Debuting director Claudiu Goga was hosted at the TNC with a new version of The Government Inspector, praised for switching focus on Nikolai Gogol's mysticism. For the Caragiale Festival of early 2002, Cornișteanu broke with cultural taboos by using manele songs as a musical background; Sorin Leoveanu earned high praise as a new Catindatul. Later that year, Elemér Kincses directed Mihali and Natașa Raab in what Stancu describes as a "faithful yet creative" retake on Năpasta.

From 2002, the TNC stood up to the new Social Democratic cabinet and its Minister of Culture, Răzvan Theodorescu, who had ceded some of the financial control to Dolj's authorities. Some of the latter reported being vexed by the drop in quality, with proof that the TNC troupe was being pushed to perform in sub-provincial community-centers. During early 2003, Cornișteanu reported that severe underfinancing was pushing him to cancel the Shakespeare Festival. An inspection uncovered that he himself had spent almost 40% of the directors' budget on his own productions. Also in 2003, Cornișteanu was staging Casa cu țoape, by Puși Dinulescu. This controversial show had Leni Pințea as a déclassée building supervisor. It was panned by critics as needlessly vulgar, while Dolj's officials wanted it censored as obscene. Late in 2003, the TNC rebounded with Kincses' version of Arturo Ui. Goga returned with a new vision on The Lower Depths, but columnist Ion Cazaban described as "linear" and inferior to other Gorky productions at the TNC.

In April 2004, Purcărete returned at Craiova to direct Twelfth Night, welcomed as a major theatrical event that could rekindle activity in that city. At the beginning of the following season, László Bocsárdi did the The Miser, in a much-applauded version starring Ilie Gheorghe, Mihali, and Cioabă. While both Purcărete and Ilie Gheorghe took UNITER awards in 2005, other productions were panned; critic Doru Mareș thus argues that Dumitru Crudu's Crima sângeroasă, directed by Șerban Puiu at the TNC, was one of the year's "absolute [and] dangerous errors". The 2005–2006 season had Romeo and Juliet, respectively portrayed by Cătălin Băicuș and Oana Bineață, with directorial credits shared by Cornișteanu and Yannis Paraskevopoulos; also then, the manager directed his crew in a play based on Alice Voinescu's diaries. Noted guests also included Alexa Visarion, who did The Cherry Orchard, seen by critic Ludmila Patlanjoglu as a modern classic and an exquisite psychological study. Around the same time, Cornișteanu launched a TNC magazine, SpectActor.

The TNC was officially renamed after Sorescu in June 2005. In early 2007, Cornișteanu realized his 1980s project of seeing Există nervi done at the TNC, albeit with Kincses directing. Filmmaker Mircea Daneliuc directed his own scenario, Doi pinguini. Geni Macsim drew praise for her acting, but Daneliuc's stagecraft was seen as rather unrefined. Another well-liked Shakespearean production came in March 2008, when Purcărete premiered his Measure for Measure. While the Shakespeare Festival was not dropped, lack of funding meant that its hosting was shared with Bucharest. In early 2010, this also meant that Bocsárdi's Hamlet was staged at the TNC, while Robert Wilson postponed his own version, which was supposed to star Leoveanu. Noted productions for that year include Toma Grigorie's Ce mai taci, Gary, which reworked Sîrbu's published diaries into a dramatic structure. Bocsárdi's staging of Albert Camus' Caligula won him and his lead, Leoveanu, top prizes at the 2012 UNITER gala, where Dellakeza took a lifetime achievement award. In late 2011, Cornișteanu and Bokor premiered a co-production of the TNC, Nottara and the Tulcea company, with Michael Frayn's Chinamen—with Cerasela Iosifescu and George Alexandru.

=== Since 2012: Bleonț and Boureanu ===
A main event of the 2011–2012 season was Purcărete's version of the Shakespearean Tempest, which impressed reviewers with its dark atmosphere. In December 2012, A Stormy Night was reimagined by Cornișteanu, in a well-received show. Here, Dellakeza, Băicuș and Iosifescu appeared alongside Claudiu Bleonț. Wilson finally arrived at the TNC in early 2014, doing Ionesco's Rhinoceros. Starring Ilie Gheorghe, Bleonț, Dellakeza, and Băicuț, it was welcomed by critic Elisabeta Pop as "too good, too short", and an "invasion of beauty". Bocsárdi also returned, with István Örkény's Tóték—seen by critic Nicolae Prelipceanu as well-done, but not entirely impressive. These ran alongside Mihaela Michailov's problem-play, Profu' de religie, described by Prelipceanu as simplistic, but "very pleasant".

British director Ben Humphrey at the TNC's Shakespeare Festival, April 2018

Cornișteanu's shows included a well-received Peter Quilter's sex comedy, The Morning After, on which he used Raab and Băicuș. He stepped down as chairman once his contract expired, in early 2016, leaving Alexandru Boureanu as his replacement. Cornișteanu was meanwhile pursued by the National Authority for Integrity in Office, which alleged that he had engaged in acts of corruption while at the TNC; the former manager countersued and won his case in early 2020, after a ruling by the High Court of Cassation and Justice. At the time of Boureanu's takeover, the TNC was hosting young director Bobi Pricop, whose take on Ivan Vyrypaev's Illyuzii won a prize at the Festival for Short Drama (Oradea, 2016). The company was registering additional success with Paraskevopoulos' take on The Seagull—with celebrated performances by Leoveanu, Iosifescu, and Vlad Udrescu. Its other guest director was the American film producer Peter Schneider, with a multimedia version of Julius Caesar. The show was panned, with Adrian Mihalache arguing that Schneider had shown little interest in motivating Bleonț and the other members of his cast. Laurențiu Tudor redid Orestia, also in the multmedia genre (with references to vlogging and Skype).

As noted by reviewer Mircea Morariu, Boureanu's new direction focused on encouraging young directors, beginning with Dragoș Alexandru Mușoiu and Andrei Măjeri. Mușoiu premiered Sarah Ruhl's In the Next Room, carried by Iosifescu and Bleonț. Morariu sees the casting as "nearly flawless", and commends Mușoiu for picking a daring text. Măjeri, meanwhile, worked with Blood Wedding, by Federico García Lorca. The production, produced at the TNC in early 2017, was reviewed by Morariu as generally promising, but overdone. During 2017–2018, Pricop was leading Bleonț and a small crew of actors in performances of Tim Crouch's Author, which experimented with the fourth wall. Timon of Athens and A Midsummer Night's Dream were merged into a single show, directed by Charles Chemin in 2018—with well-received performances by Bleonț, Leoveanu, and Marian Politic, but reserved appraisals of Chemin's dramatic vision.

After the season break in 2018–2019, the TNC took accolades for David Drábek's Čokoládový dům, as directed by Radu Afrim. Mihai Măniuțiu returned, alongside his wife Anca, with their own text about Ajax the Great, combining themes from Sophocles—Bleonț was cast as the titular character. Morariu sees it as "majestic", in particular for its choreography (by Andreea Gavriliu), but overall too focused on formal aspects. In tandem with experimentation, the TNC contributed conventional works. These remained the most popular: in December 2014, Kincses' Năpasta was the company's longest-lived show, with over 100 stagings. The company was also performing another classical hit, The Servant of Two Masters. It was still on the playbill in 2020, and still appreciated by critics, despite Mugur having died in 2001. In early 2018, as part of the Great Union centennial, it helped produce a Boroghină show at Nottara, which centered on patriotic poems.

During the 2021–2022 season, Boureanu called in Ukrainian director Andriy Zholdak, who took up Henrik Ibsen's Lady from the Sea; Costinela Ungureanu was the star actress. Oedipus Rex, directed by Declan Donnellan and centered on local actor Claudiu Mihail, was reported as another hit—in particular for its complete removal of the fourth wall. Shows for 2023 included Gen. Snowflake, done by Pricop with a class of Babeș-Bolyai University students (and tackling topics such as online identity and body shaming). During October 2024, the TNC celebrated its most successful director in a "Purcărete Week", attended by, among others, Bleonț, Victor Rebengiuc, and Marius Manole.
