= Firan =

Firan may refer to:

- Firan language, Nigeria
- Carmen Firan, poet
