= Mammoth (play) =

1990 satirical play by Bulgarian playwright Stanislav Stratiev

Mammoth (Bulgarian: Мамут) is a 1990 satirical play by Bulgarian playwright Stanislav Stratiev. It was written in 1989, but premiered at the Satirical Theatre of Sofia on October 12, 1990.

== Plot ==
The play centres around the Associate Professor of Linguistics Ivan Antonov, his wife Martha—a professor of composition at the conservatory, and their son Bozhidar. Suddenly, in the middle of the night on the wall appears the shadow of the mammoth, which is said to appear wherever an unsolved crime is committed. Gradually the shadow of the mammoth appears throughout the block, neighborhood, and finally across the city.
