= Bengescu =

Bengescu is a Romanian surname. Notable people with the surname include:

- George Bengescu-Dabija (1844–1916), writer
- Gheorghe Bengescu (1848–1922), diplomat and literary historian
- Hortensia Papadat-Bengescu (1876–1955), writer, niece of George
