= D.L. (play) =

D.L. is a play by Bulgarian playwright Ana Vaseva. A production was put on in 2005 by directors Svetoslav Nikolov and Milena Stanojevic at the Satirical Theatre in Sofia, with music by Eva Spassova. The play starred Bojan Mechkov, Zornitsa Lazarova, Irena Todorova, Nevena Dencheva, and Stela Krasteva.
