= Ion Dongorozi =

Romanian writer (1894–1975)

Dongorozi in 1923

Ion Dongorozi (January 4, 1894 – May 20, 1975) was a Romanian prose writer.

Born in Tecuci, his parents were Dionisie Dongorozi and his wife Ecaterina. After attending Vasile Alecsandri High School in Galați, he studied at the literature and philosophy faculty of the University of Bucharest, as well as at the pedagogical institute in the same city. He made his published debut after World War I in Convorbiri Literare magazine. His work also appeared in Ramuri, Universul literar, Scrisul românesc, Rampa and Adevărul literar și artistic. A high school philosophy and geography teacher in Craiova and Bucharest, he directed the National Theater Craiova from 1926 to 1927. During his tenure, Dongorozi introduced Sunday performances in schools, prisons and barracks; organized conferences featuring prestigious invitees; and held traveling shows throughout Oltenia. He served as Prefect of Caraș County in 1931. He co-authored textbooks with Simion Mehedinți.

His short prose, in a picturesque Sămănătorist style, appeared in a number of volumes: Cum s-a despărțit tanti Veronica, Filimon Hâncu (1924), La hotarul dobrogean (1924), Signor Berthelotty (1926), Socoteli greșite (1926), Examen de bacalaureat (1928), Ancheta (1930), Țucu (1931), Reprezentație de adio (1932) and Belfer îndrăgostit (1934). He also wrote Castelul preutesei (1943) and Chipuri de copii (1944). He ceased writing for over a decade before returning with a new ideological outlook. This conformed to the demands of the communist regime that had assumed power, as exemplified in A deraiat un expres (1957), Vâltori (vol. I, 1958) and Stea de cinema (1971).
