= Cluj-Napoca National Theatre =

Theatre in Cluj-Napoca, Romania

Coordinates: 46°46′13″N 23°35′50″E

Lucian Blaga National Theatre
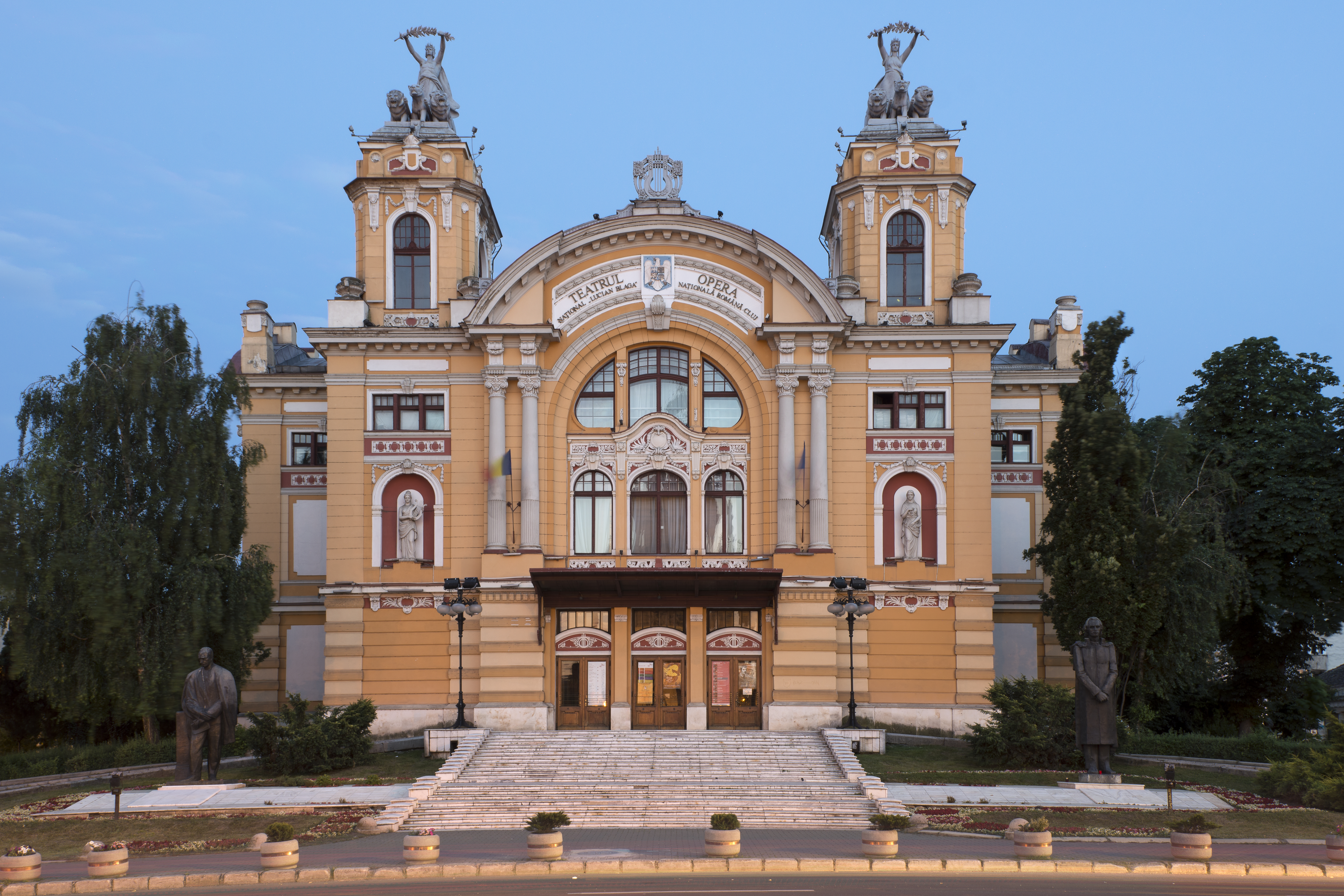
- Front view
- Interactive map of the Lucian Blaga National Theatre area

General information
- Architectural style: Neo-baroque
- Location: Cluj-Napoca, Romania
- Construction started: 1904
- Completed: 1906

Design and construction
- Architect: Ferdinand Fellner and Hermann Helmer

Other information
- Seating capacity: 928

Website
- www.teatrulnationalcluj.ro

The Lucian Blaga National Theatre (Romanian: Teatrul Național Lucian Blaga) is in Cluj-Napoca, Romania, sharing its building with the Romanian Opera.

== Building ==
The theatre was built between 1904 and 1906 by the Austrian architects Ferdinand Fellner and Hermann Helmer, who designed several theatres and palaces across Europe in the late 19th and early 20th century, including the theatres in Iași, Oradea, Timișoara, and Chernivtsi (Romanian: Cernăuți). The project was financed using only private capital: Sandor Ujfalfy bequeathed his domains and estates from Szolnok-Doboka County to the National Theatre Fund from Kolozsvár.

The theatre opened on 8 September 1906 with Ferenc Herczeg's Bujdosók. Until 1919, as Cluj was part of the Kingdom of Hungary, it was home to the local Hungarian National Theatre (Hungarian: Nemzeti Színház). The last performance of the Hungarian troupe was Shakespeare's Hamlet, September 30, 1919.

Since 1919, when Cluj passed under Romanian administration, the building has been home to the local Romanian National Theatre and Romanian Opera, while the local Hungarian Theatre and Opera received the theatre building in Emil Isac street, close to the Central Park and the Someșul Mic River.

After the Second Vienna Award of 1940 and the annexation of Northern Transylvania by Hungary, the building was again the home of the Hungarian Theatre. On 31 October 1944 the Romanian and Hungarian actors celebrating the freedom of the city held a common benefit performance for Russian and Romanian wounded soldiers.

The hall has a capacity of 928 places. It is in the Neo-baroque style, with some inflexions inspired by the Secessionism in the decoration of the foyer.

The building of the National Theatre in Cluj-Napoca is listed in the National Register of Historic Monuments.

== History ==
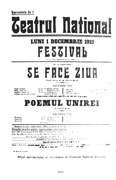
First Romanian advertising material, Nov 1919

The Romanian National Theatre was officially opened on 18 September 1919, simultaneously with the Romanian Opera and the Gheorghe Dima National Music Academy. The inaugural performance, Poemul Unirei (English: The Unification Poem) by Zaharia Bârsan, took place on 1 December 1919.

The founder and first director of the National Theatre of Cluj was Zaharia Bârsan, actor, stage director, playwright and animator. Some of the first members of the National Theatre include Olimpia Bârsan, Stănescu-Papa, Dem Mihăilescu-Brăila, Nicolae Neamțu-Ottonel, Jeana Popovici, Stanca Alexandrescu, Ion Tâlvan, and Ștefan Braborescu.

Between 1936 and 1940 director Victor Papilian moved towards modernity. In that period, a studio was created, in order to connect the public with modern dramatic productions. Some famous actors of the time include Magda Tâlvan, Maria Cupcea, Titus Croitoru, Violeta Boitoș, Viorica Iuga, Nicolae Sasu, and Gheorghe Aurelian.

In 1940, as a result of the Second Vienna Award, the theatre, like other Romanian institutions, had to move to the Romanian part of the artificially divided Transylvania. While the local university moved to Sibiu, the national theatre moved to Timișoara. In December 1945, at the end of World War II, as Cluj became part of Romania once again, the theatrical institution returned to Cluj and restarted its activity, under the directorship of Aurel Buteanu.

Between 1948 and 1964, although under the initial stages of the Communist regime, the theatre managed to keep true to its artistic values. Famous names of the time include Marietta Sadova, Ștefan Braborescu, Radu Stanca, Viorica Cernucan, Maia Țipan-Kaufmann, Ligia Moga, Gheorghe M. Nuțescu, Emilia Hodiș, Gheorghe Radu, Aurel Giurumia, Alexandru Munte, and Silvia Ghelan.

After 1965, with Vlad Mugur as director, the theatre focused on aesthetic values, refusing the ideological and moralising line imposed by the increasingly strict Communist authorities. The performances became based on a balanced type of Modernism. In this period the National Theatre established itself as an important European theatrical institution, due to the prestigious artistic tours in Italy with performances such as Iphigeneia in Tauris by Euripides, Caligula by Albert Camus, A Midsummer Night's Dream by William Shakespeare. Among the young famous artists of the time there were Silvia Popovici, Valentino Dain, Melania Ursu, Valeria Seciu, George Motoi, Dorel Vișan, and Anton Tauf.

The directors that followed, Ion Vlad, Maia Țipan-Kaufmann, Petre Bucșa, Constantin Cubleșan, and Horia Bădescu, continued to try, often successfully, to avoid Communist censorship by maintaining a balance between national and universal dramatic texts and between classical and modern elements. Famous artists of the time include Mihai Măniuțiu, Gelu Bogdan Ivașcu, Maria Munteanu, Ileana Negru, Miriam Cuibus, Marius Bodochi, Petre Băcioiu, and Dorin Andone. In this period, performances such as Săptămîna luminată by Mihail Săulescu, The Lesson by Eugène Ionesco, and Murder in the Cathedral by T. S. Eliot were staged during several tours in England, France, Yugoslavia, Finland, the United States, and Egypt.

After the Romanian Revolution of 1989, the performances became more diverse and modern. Names of this period include Victor Ioan Frunză, Mihai Măniuțiu, Mona Chirilă, Anca Bradu, Theodor-Cristian Popescu, Liviu Ciulei, Crin Teodorescu, Lucian Giurchescu, Mircea Marosin, Sorana Coroamă-Stanca, Horea Popescu, Gheorghe Harag, and Dinu Cernescu. The directors of the theatre until 2000 were, successively, Victor Ioan Frunză, Anton Tauf, and Dorel Vișan.

In 2011 Mihai Măniuțiu became the director of the Cluj-Napoca National Theatre, which performed original classic and modern, Romanian and universal plays. Stage directors include Vlad Mugur, Mihai Măniuțiu, Sanda Manu, and Alexandru Dabija.
