= Vlad Mugur =

Romanian-born German theater director

Vlad Mugur (born 22 June 1927, Bucharest, Romania; died 22 July 2001, Munich, Germany) was a Romanian-born German theater director.

He graduated from the Bucharest Theater Institute (directing class) as valedictorian in 1949, but he had already started to direct plays two years earlier, in 1947.

In 1965 he became director of the National Theater in Cluj. He held this job until 1971, when he defected to Italy, as he disagreed with the so-called July Theses- the attack on non-compliant intellectuals, initiated by the Romanian Communist Party Secretary General, Nicolae Ceauşescu. Later, he moved to Munich, Germany, where he collaborated for a while with Radio Free Europe, before moving to Koblenz.

In Romania he staged plays at the theaters in Bucharest, Cluj (Teatrul Naţional Lucian Blaga and Kolozsvári Állami Magyar Színház), Craiova, Târgu Mureş, Galaţi, among others.

In Germany he directed plays at theaters in Munich, Konstanz, Hanover, Esslingen, Münster, among others.

He staged plays by William Shakespeare, Carlo Goldoni, Luigi Pirandello, Konstantin Simonov, Anton Chekhov, Vsevolod Vishnevskiy, Peter Handke, Walter Jens, Alexei Arbuzov, Albert Camus, Radu Cosaşu, Alexandru Andrițoiu, etc.

He was married to Magda Stief, an actress.

The Vlad Mugur Prize- which is awarded by the Cluj-Napoca Hungarian Theatre is named after him.

== Prizes ==
The UNITER Prize for 1999.

The Theatrical Personality of the Year for 2000, by the Tofan Foundation.
