= Satirical Theatre =

Theatre in Sofia, Bulgaria

Coordinates: 42°41′30″N 23°19′35″E

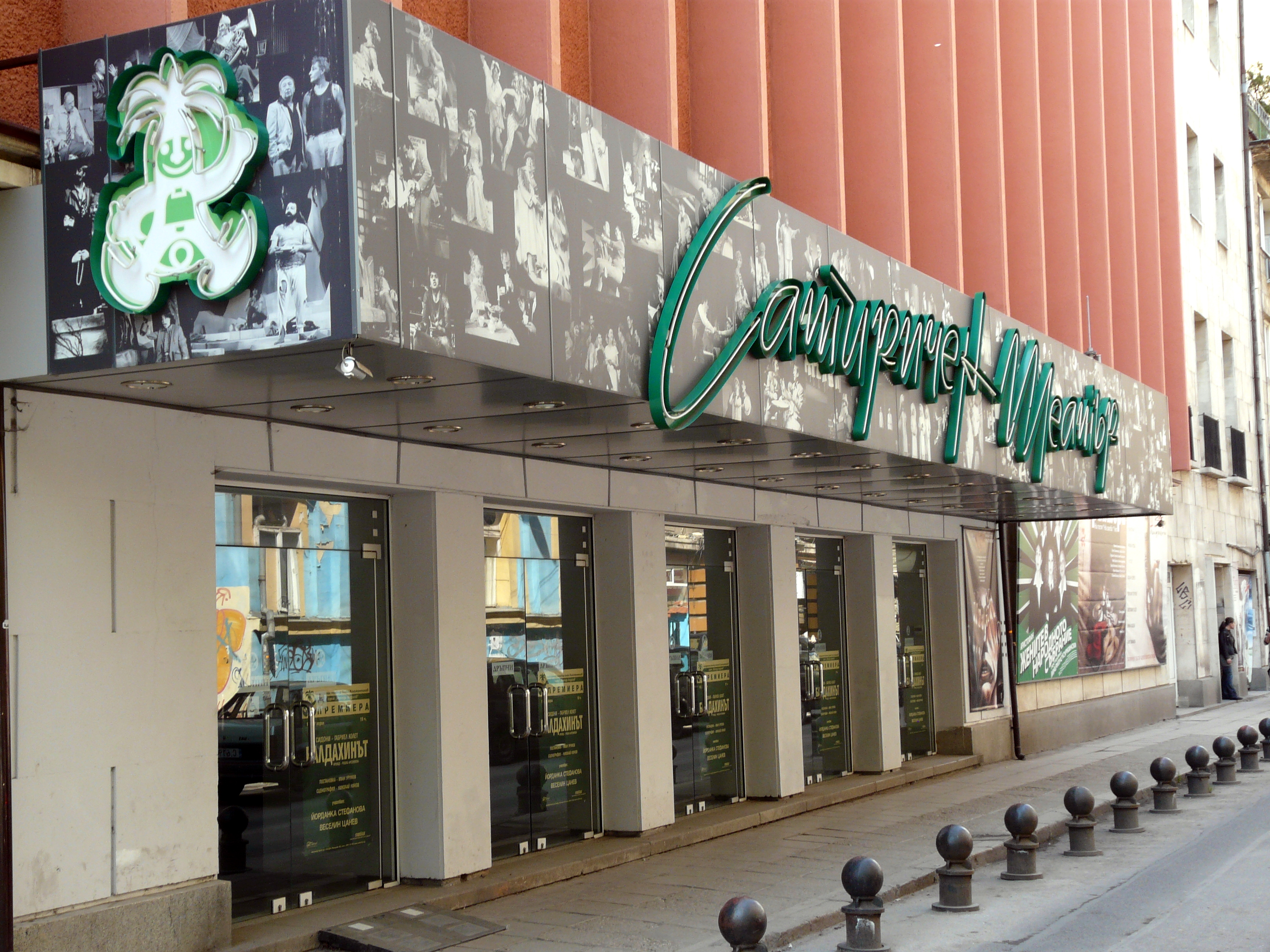
Satirical Theatre

The Aleko Konstantinov State Satirical Theatre (Bulgarian: Държавен сатиричен театър „Алеко Константинов“, Darzhaven satirichen teatar „Aleko Konstantinov“), commonly known as the Satirical Theatre, is a theatre in Sofia, Bulgaria, located on Georgi Rakovski Street, known as "Sofia Broadway". It was established in 1957 and named after writer Aleko Konstantinov, author of the satirical series Bay Ganyo. In 1974, the theatre put on a very successful production of Stanislav Stratiev's The Roman Bath, which was put on for more than ten years. In 2005 the theatre put on a production of Ana Vaseva's D.L..

There are two stages in the theater. Both the large "Stastliveza" stage and the smaller "Metody Andonov" stage are accessible to those with disabilities. It frequently hosts scheduled exhibitions in its foyers. The theater has received thirteen wins and thirty-two nominations in different categories for the title of most distinguished Bulgarian theater.
