= The Roman Bath =

The Roman Bath (Bulgarian: Римска баня) is a 1974 absurdist play by Bulgarian playwright Stanislav Stratiev. A very successful production was put on for well over ten years from February 11, 1974, until the early 1990s at the Satirical Theatre in Sofia, making it the longest-running production in the theatre's history. In 1984, the show was awarded the "Award of Sofia", and two years later, it was performed at the "Theatre of Nations" festival in Nancy, France. It is cited as Stratiev's funniest work.

== British production ==
In 2010, the play had its British premiere at the Arcola Theatre in Hackney, London. Michael Billington of The Guardian wrote: "Russell Bolam's production camouflages this through its phenomenal energy and Jean Chan's design skilfully shows the havoc created by the apartment's space invaders. Ifan Meredith's Ivan, first seen arguing with and then desperately kissing a taxi-ordering machine, also conveys the difficulty of leading a rational life in an irrational universe. And there is lively support from Bo Poraj as a manically egotistical academic, Jonathan Rhodes as a buccaneering dealer in stolen goods and Rhona Croker who invests Ivan's redemptive lover with a nice sense of erotic mischief. I'm not sure how closely the play relates, as Butcher suggests, to our own mad world. But Stratiev, who died in 2000, emerges as a fascinating writer who realised that comedy is ultimately the best weapon for subverting state power".
