= Mihai Măniuțiu =

Romanian-born theatre director, writer and theoretician

Mihai Maniutiu (born 1954) is a Romanian-born theatre director, writer and theatre/performance theoretician. He has directed over eighty productions in important theatres, many of which have been toured internationally, broadcast on European TV channels, and won numerous awards in the categories for Best Director, Best Production, and Originality. Maniutiu is a professor at the Faculty of Theatre and Television of the Babeș-Bolyai University in Cluj-Napoca, Romania and Artistic Director and General Manager of the National Theatre of Cluj. In addition to teaching directing, acting, and performance studies (MFA & Doctoral Programs) at the Faculty of Theatre and Television of the University of Cluj, and his position of General Director of the National Theatre in Cluj, Maniutiu has also been Artist-in-Residence at the Center of Excellence in Image Study at the University of Bucharest (MFA Program in Performance) since Fall 2009.

In 1998, he co-founded, with fellow-artists Marcel Iureș and Alexandru Dabija, Romania's first independent theatre, The Act Theatre in Bucharest, the Patrons of which are Judi Dench and Tom Cruise, among other international personalities. Since 2009, he is a Visiting Professor of Drama at the University of California, Irvine (UCI). In 2009, he directed a production, based on Euripides, entitled The Bacchae Trilogy, with an especially strong ensemble of mainly graduate actors and faculty artist Keith Fowler. Continuing to the present at UCI (now as a Distinguished Professor), in 2013 he directed a re-imagining of Euripides' Trojan Women, entitled After Troy. Most recently he has written and directed a piece titled "The Electra Project" which was inspired by several sources of the classic Electra story. "The Electra Project" featured a large ensemble composed of student actors, supplemented by the Romanian musicians known as Grupul Iza, or The Iza Group. In 2024, he directed a production of Ionesco's, The Bald Soprano at UCI in the Robert Cohen Theater.

As a writer, he has published eleven books of short stories, one book on Shakespeare, The Golden Round (Bucharest: Meridiane Press, 1989; second edition Bucharest: Camil Petrescu Foundation Press, 2003), and three books of theatre theory: On Mask and Illusion (Despre Masca si iluzie, Bucharest: Humanitas, 2007); Act and Mimetic Representation (Bucharest: Eminescu, 1989; Hungarian edition Aktus es utanzas, Cluj: Koinónia Publishing, 2006); and Rediscovering the Actor (Bucharest: Meridiane, 1985). His most recent fiction book is "Memoriile Hingherului" (Cluj: Bibliotek, 2010).

Maniutiu holds a PhD in Theatre Theory from the Caragiale Academy of Theatrical Arts and Cinematography in Bucharest (2006).
