= Stanislav Stratiev =

Bulgarian writer (1941–2000)

- Born: 9 September 1941; Sofia, Bulgaria
- Died: 20 September 2000 (aged 59); Sofia, Bulgaria
- Occupations: Playwright, screenwriter, author
- Writing career
- Period: 1958–2000
- Website: www.stanislavstratiev.org

Stanislav Stratiev (Bulgarian: Станислав Стратиев; 9 September 1941 – 20 September 2000) was a Bulgarian playwright, screenwriter, and author.

== Biography ==
He began his career as a journalist while studying for an MA in literature at Sofia University. Stratiev's career as a playwright took off in 1974 with the runaway success of his first play, The Roman Bath, which was performed at the Sofia's Satirical Theatre for more than 10 consecutive seasons to packed halls. That was followed by The Suede Jacket, The Bus, and many others. Stratiev's plays have been performed in Belgium, China, the Czech Republic, Estonia, Finland, France, Germany, Greece, Hungary, India, Ireland, Italy, Morocco, Poland, Romania, Russia, Sweden, Syria, the Slovak Republic, Turkey, and others. His play It's a Short Life (translated in French as La vie bien qu'elle soit courte) won the First Prize at the Maubeuge International Theatre Festival in 1990. On the Other Side was runner-up in the BBC World Service Radio's Playwriting Competition 1993 and was produced and broadcast by the BBC. While most popular as a playwright, Stratiev also wrote prose works combining social satire and lyricism, translated into more than 30 languages all over the world. His film scripts earned him international acclaim too: Equilibrium won a silver medal at the 13th International Film Festival in Moscow in 1983; Childhood Sun won "The Child in Our Time" award at the MIFED (Mercato internazionale del film e del documentario) in Milan that same year. The cult comedy A Band With No Name was recognized as the best Bulgarian film of all times by the readers of the 24 Chasa daily in 2005 and favourite Bulgarian film by the listeners of Atlantic radio in 2006. From 1975 until his death in 2000 he worked as literary director of the Sofia Satirical Theatre.

== Plays ==
- The Roman Bath
- The Suede Jacket
- Bus
- The Perfectionist
- Don't Lose Your Spirit
- It's a Short Life
- Mammoth
- On the Other Side
- Empty Rooms

== Films ==
- The Wardrobe (1974)
- The Warden of the Fortress (1974)
- Short Sun (1979)
- Childhood Sun (1981)
- A Band With No Name (1982)
- Balance (1983)
- Even God Has Come Down To See Us (2001)
- Sparrows in October (2006)

== See also ==
- Lists of Bulgarians
- Orkestar bez ime
