= Mihai Florea =

Romanian publicist, writer, and historian

Mihai Florea (1929–1986) was a publicist, theater historian, and script writer for radio and television. He was born in Buzău. Florea was presenter of the popular program Floarea din Grădină on the Romanian Television.
