= Carmen Firan =

Romanian-American poet

Carmen Firan (born 29 November 1958, Craiova) is a poet, novelist, short story writer, journalist, and playwright, resident in New York City.

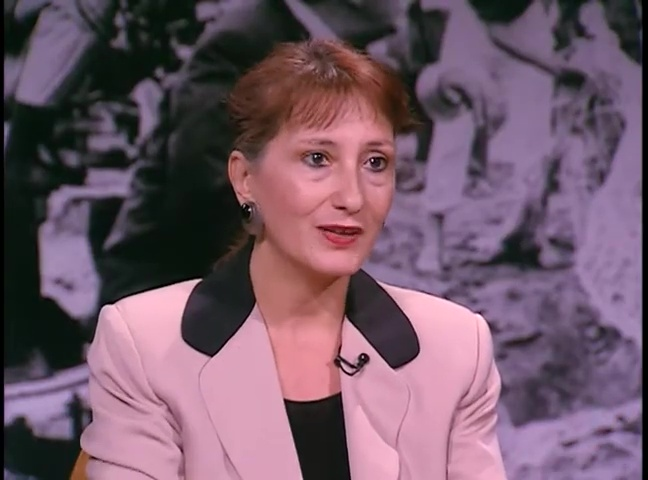
Firan on CUNY TV's City Cinematheque, 2004

She has published twenty books of poetry, novels, essays and short stories. Her writings appear in translation in many literary magazines and in various anthologies in France, Israel, Sweden, Germany, Ireland, Poland, Canada, U K, and the U.S. Her recent books and publications in the United States include: Interviews and Encounters. Carmen Firan in dialogue and poetry with Nina Cassian (Sheep Meadow Press), Inferno, Rock and Dew (Sheep Meadow Press), Words and Flesh (Talisman Publishers), The Second Life (Columbia University Press), The Farce (Spuyten Duyvil Press), In The Most Beautiful Life (Umbrage Editions), and The First Moment After Death (Writers Club Press).

She is a member of PEN American Center and the Poetry Society of America and serves on the editorial board of the international magazineInterpoezia (New York). She is the co-editor of Naming the Nameless (An Anthology of Contemporary American Poetry), Stranger at Home, Poetry with an Accent, and Born in Utopia (An Anthology of Romanian Modern and Contemporary Poetry).

== Works ==
=== Short stories and novels ===
- Umbra pierduta (2018)
- Judecata. Adrian Sangeorzan vs Carmen Firan cu un verdict de Andrei Codrescu (2016)
- Timp in doi (2016)
- Interviews and Encounters, Carmen Firan and Nina Cassian, (2016)
- Dreptul la fericire, (2016), in Romanian
- Dialogul Vantului cu Marea, Nina Cassian in conversatie cu Carmen Firan, (2015)
- Unde incepe cerul (Where the Sky Begins)(2014), in Romanian
- "Inferno" (2011), in English
- "Detectorul de emotii" (2011), in Romanian
- Miracole mici si mijlocii (2009), in Romanian
- Words and Flesh (2008), in English
- Puterea cuvintelor (2008), in Romanian
- The Second Life: Collection of Novellas and Short-Stories (2005), previous stories translated into English: Somewhere in the East, Light in the Attic, The Second Life, Three for Inferno, The Boiler Man, Post-Meridian, Parking, Concession, and The Russian Fur Hat
- Caloriferistul si Nevasta Hermeneutului ("The Boiler Man and the Master's Wife") (2005)
- Farsa (2002), translated into English as The Farce
- Tot Mai Aproape ("Getting Closer") (1991), in Romanian

=== Poetry ===
- Sertarul cu albine ("Bees in a Drawer") (2015), in Romanian
- Rock and Dew (2010) in English
- Cuvinte Locuite ("Inhabited Words") (2006), in Romanian
- Cuceriri Disperate ("Desperate Conquests") (2005), bilingual, Romanian with English translation
- Voci pe Muchie de Cutit ("Voices on a Razor's Edge") (2003), bilingual, Romanian with English translation
- Afternoon With an Angel (2000), in English
- The First Moment After Death (2000), in English
- Accomplished Error (1999), in English
- Punished Candors, (1998)
- Places for Living Lonely,(1997)
- Pure Black,(1995)
- Staircase under the Sea,(1994)
- Tamer of Stolen Lives,(1984)
- Paradise for Monday,(1983)
- Illusions on My Own,(1981)

=== Plays ===
- Cum sa te desparti intr-o zi perfecta (How to Separate in a Perfect Day) (2017)
- Lumina din Pod ("Light in the Attic") (2002)
- Vis in Acvariu ("Dreaming into an Aquarium") (1985)
- Vinatoare Imaginara ("Imaginary Hunting") (1983)
- Polen pe Insula ("Pollen on the Island") (1982)

== Presences in anthologies ==
- Born in Utopia (An Anthology of Romanian Modern and Contemporary Poetry). - editors Carmen Firan and Paul Doru Mugur, with Edward Foster - Talisman House Publishers, 2006
- Testament - Anthology of Romanian Verse - American Edition - monolingual English edition - Daniel Ioniță (editor and translator), with Eva Foster, Daniel Reynaud and Rochelle Bews - Australian-Romanian Academy Publishing - 2017 - ISBN 978-0-9953502-0-5
- Testament - 400 Years of Romanian Poetry - 400 de ani de poezie românească - bilingual edition - Daniel Ioniță (editor and principal translator) with Daniel Reynaud, Adriana Paul & Eva Foster - Editura Minerva, 2019 - ISBN 978-973-21-1070-6
- Romanian Poetry from its Origins to the Present - bilingual edition English/Romanian - Daniel Ioniță (editor and principal translator) with Daniel Reynaud, Adriana Paul and Eva Foster - Australian-Romanian Academy Publishing - 2020 - ISBN 978-0-9953502-8-1 ; LCCN - 202090783
