= George Bengescu-Dabija =

Wallachian poet, playwright and army general

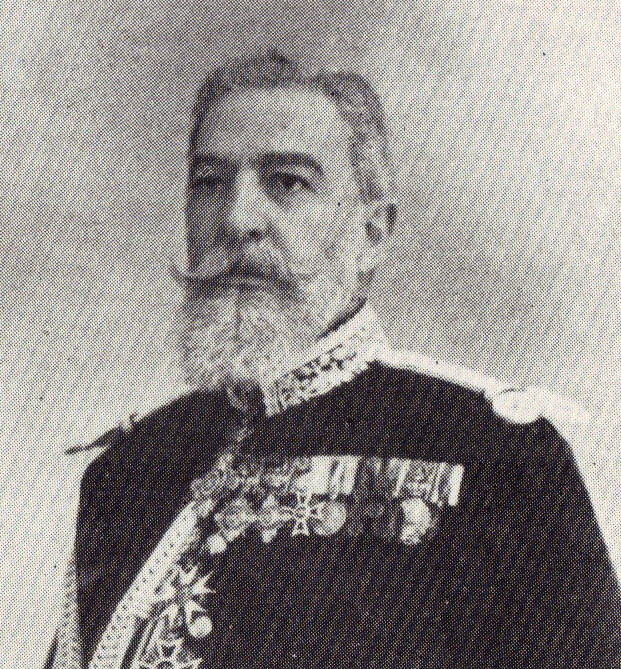
- Born: George Bengescu; June 30, 1844; Bucharest, Wallachia
- Died: January 13, 1916 (aged 71); Bucharest, Kingdom of Romania
- Occupations: Poet, playwright, and army general
- Spouse: Sofia Dabija
- Parents: Titus Bengescu (father); Louise Salviny von Uffmann (mother)
- Relatives: Hortensia Papadat-Bengescu

George Bengescu-Dabija (June 30, 1844 – January 13, 1916) was a Wallachian, later Romanian poet, playwright, and army general.

== Biography ==
Born in Bucharest, his parents were Titus Bengescu and Louise Salviny von Uffmann, who was of Austrian origin. His wife and devoted collaborator, who polished his verses, was Sofia Dabija; he added her name to his own. His niece was Hortensia Papadat-Bengescu. After his father died during his youth, Bengescu joined the army at age fifteen. He attended military academies in Austria and France, eventually becoming a general. For five years, he taught a course on general administration at the Higher War School, and published a number of military-related books. He served as Senator for Fălciu County, was a member of Junimea and contributed verses and plays to its Convorbiri Literare organ. He sometimes used the pen names G. Bradu and Glonț ("bullet") or his initials, B. D.

Bengescu-Dabija's concerns included the cultivation of the language and the valuing of its folk resources, as well as the reorganization of the theatre for the purposes of national uplift, along the lines begun by Vasile Alecsandri and Bogdan Petriceicu Hasdeu. His literary debut work was the 1870 Amorul unchiului, a vaudeville act adapted from Eugène Sue; Matilda Cugler-Poni appeared in the stage version. He wrote librettos for operetta shows and added comic and dramatic pieces to the repertory; these include Radu III cel Frumos (1875), Cucoana Nastasia Hodoronc (1877), and Pygmalion, regele Feniciei (1886).

He died in Bucharest in 1916, at age 71.
