= Aleksei Arbuzov =

Soviet playwright

Aleksei Arbuzov

Aleksei Nikolayevich Arbuzov (Russian: Алексей Николаевич Арбузов; May 26 [O.S. May 13] 1908 – April 20, 1986) was a Soviet and Russian playwright.

== Biography ==
Arbuzov was born in Moscow, but his family moved to Petrograd in 1914. His father was Russian and his mother was Greek. Orphaned at the age of eleven, he found salvation in the theatre, and at fourteen he began to work in the Mariinsky Theatre. In 1928 he joined a group of young actors in the Guild of Experimental Drama; after its dissolution he joined a traveling agitprop theater for which he began to write plays. He moved to Moscow in 1930; in 1935 he wrote the play A Long Road and in 1939 Tanya, his two most successful plays. Avril Pyman writes of him, "The charm of his work lies in his shrewd but affectionate attitude to his fellow-man; he sees through human foibles to the basic desire to lead a good and useful life, and creates plausible, even likeable, 'positive' characters."

Several of Arbuzov's plays deal with personal transformation and redemption within a Soviet context. In Tanya (1939), a woman whose life is shattered by the death of her husband finally finds meaning and purpose in serving the sick in a Siberian village. An Irkutsk Story (1960) describes how the shallow and hedonistic life of 25-year-old Valya is transformed by the love of Sergei, foreman of an excavator crew building a dam in Siberia. Following the death of Sergei in a drowning accident, she finds new meaning in joining the construction crew and raising her children. This affectionate immersion into the emotional lives of his characters brought rebukes from some Soviet literary critics. For example, Dmitry Shcheglov wrote, "Upon turning to a play by Arbuzov, we are engulfed in a pleasant atmosphere of universal love, nobility, and friendship; however, these fine feelings fail to guide us, to mobilize us, or to direct our minds and thoughts toward a great goal." Arbuzov's characters embrace the communist ideal of working to build a classless society, but it is the celebration of their personal struggles that endeared Arbuzov to Soviet audiences.
