= Al. C. Calotescu-Neicu =

Romanian columnist and epigrammatist (1888–1952)

Alexandru С. Calotescu-Neicu (1888–1952) was a Romanian columnist and epigrammatist.

Born in Turceni, Gorj County, he attended primary school in his native village. He then went to the Traian High School in Turnu Severin, followed by Carol I High School in Craiova. After two years at the Gheorghe Chițu school in the same city, he studied agriculture at the University of Hohenheim. He published epigrams, tales and translations of Guy de Maupassant and Johann Wolfgang von Goethe. Together with Dumitru Tomescu and Constantin Șaban Făgețel, he took part in founding Ramuri magazine. With Ion Dongorozi and Făgețel, he edited Vatra magazine. He was a member of the Romanian Writers' Union.

Calotescu-Neicu's residence in Broșteni village was a gathering place for writers, scientists and artists, including Tudor Arghezi, Ion Minulescu, Alexandru Cazaban, Mihail Drumeș, Simion Mehedinți, Petre Ștefănescu Goangă, Ion Popescu-Voitesti, Ion Nestor, Constantin S. Nicolăescu-Plopșor, Remus Comăneanu, Anghel Chiciu and Mircea Olarian. His contributions appeared in Cele trei Crișuri, Cosânzeana, Neamul Românesc, Viață literară, Ilustrațiunea română, Facla and Arhivele Olteniei. He died in Goranu, a village now administered by Râmnicu Vâlcea city.
