= Tiberiu Iliescu =

Romanian writer and schoolteacher (1906–1978)

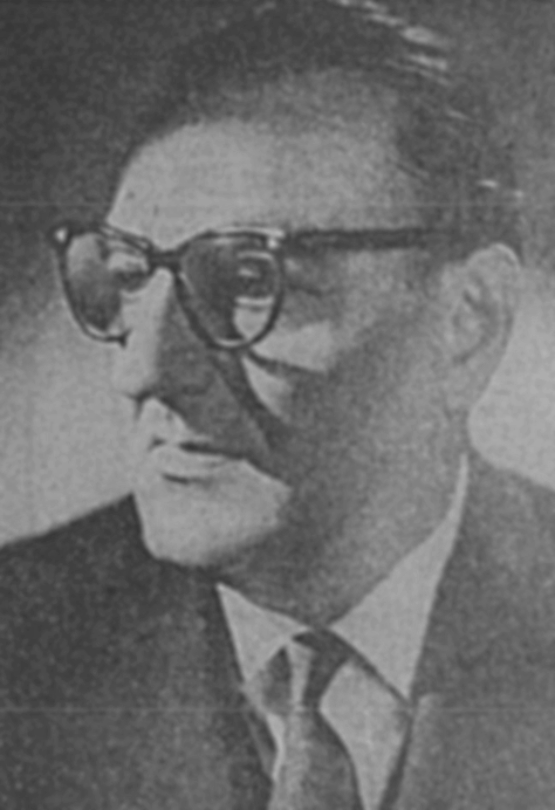
- Iliescu c. 1968
- Born: 21 December 1906; Craiova, Kingdom of Romania
- Died: 12 April 1978 (aged 71); Bucharest, Socialist Republic of Romania
- Occupations: Journalist; editor; critic; translator; schoolteacher; librarian; civil servant; theater manager; trade unionist
- Writing career
- Period: c. 1924–1970
- Genres: Lyric poetry; prose poem; essay; short story; novella; biography; satire; reportage; travel writing
- Movements: Literary modernism; surrealism; proletarian literature

Tiberiu Iliescu (21 December 1906 – 12 April 1978) was a Romanian writer, editor and teacher, intimately associated with the city of Craiova and the wider Oltenia region. He was born there into an artisan's family, and published his first literary contribution while still a student at Carol I High School. He studied at the University of Bucharest, during which time he became involved with literary modernism, coming under Tudor Arghezi's influence. Iliescu then worked at various provincial schools, returning to Craiova to teach at Frații Buzești. Alongside Constantin Nissipeanu and Mihnea Gheorghiu, he helped create an Oltenian avant-garde cell, which, from 1934, put out Meridian magazine. It acquired a national notoriety, attracting established modernists, or up-and-coming talents, from across the Kingdom of Romania. In the late interwar, Iliescu was especially known for his prose poetry, which merged with literary and social criticism, with biography, or with surrealistic elements.

Meridian lived to its stated goal of shocking the bourgeoisie, and was rejected by the local elites. It became associated with leftist causes, and overall with proletarian literature. Iliescu himself later claimed that he was already a Marxist before World War II, but his boast was treated with some suspicion by the local school of Marxist literary criticism. Under the fascist regimes of the 1940s, Meridian continued to appear sporadically, reducing its political content—though it also featured occasional, subtle, critiques, such as when Iliescu praised the old-regime politician Nicolae Iorga (assassinated by the Iron Guard in 1940). Meridian's most documented association with the anti-fascist resistance movement and the underground Communist Party was through a wartime contributor, Petre Pandrea.

Though the extent of Pandrea's participation remains debated (with Iliescu denying that he was ever an ideological or financial backer), the two men had a close friendship; in Pandrea's account, Iliescu directly helped with rescuing hundreds of anti-fascists who were facing the death penalty. Following the anti-fascist coup of 1944, Iliescu returned to political favor, helping consolidate generically leftist, and then specifically communist, organs of power in Oltenia. He himself served as chairman of the National Theater Craiova in 1944–1947; resolutely committed to making Craiova into a hub for modernist-and-political drama, he found himself challenged over allegations of financial misappropriation, and only preserved as a functionary at the Ministry of Arts.

Iliescu was ignored, and sometimes distrusted, during the early stages of the communist regime, when Pandrea was incarcerated as a result of factional conflicts. He himself worked as a teacher and translator in Bucharest, only making his comeback in the late 1960s, after formal retirement. He published an anthology of his interwar pieces, as well as an entirely new book in the reportage genre; he died in 1978, just as he was coming to be seen as a mentor of the neo-modernists, an anti-fascist forerunner of the regime, and a relevant figure on Oltenia's artistic scene. His son, Petruș Mircea, moved to Sweden as a religious scholar, but made returns to Romania so as to cultivate and defend Iliescu Sr's legacy.

== Biography ==
=== Early life ===
Born at Craiova on 21 December 1906, Iliescu was of a lowly origin. Pandrea, who befriended him when they were both in their thirties, believes that his ethnic and social background was Romani, and that his later matrimonial woes would have been smoothed out had he married into his own "Gypsy" community. This view is contrasted by Iliescu's own autobiographical narrative, outlined in a 1976 interview. According to this account, his father Petre "Tache" Ciobanu, originally from Gănești-Lăcusteni, was an orphaned and illiterate peasant, who had walked to Craiova to set up a quilting shop. Later in life, Ciobanu took the surname Iliescu. He and his Maria had thirteen children together, but only four survived to adulthood. Revenues from the family business allowed the future poet and his siblings to have an education. One of his brothers, Atanasie, went on to work as an editor of Minerva daily, under Ioan Slavici; another one, Mircea, became a physician; a third, Grigore, was a colonel in the Romanian Land Forces.

Tiberiu himself began his education at a school maintained by the Roman Catholic diocese (and initially located near Madona Dudu Church), where he was colleagues with another future poet, Constantin Nissipeanu. He was in Craiova, enlisted at School No. 4 in Craiovița neighborhood, during the early years of World War I. He witnessed the Romanian defeats of 1916, and stayed behind as the city was occupied by the Imperial German Army. One of his childhood memories was of Uhlans randomly spearing geese on Craiovița's streets. He also recalled being "dirt-poor", with wooden clogs and no money for a proper uniform. When he won a school competition, he could not represent it at the next level, due to his derelict appearance, and had to be replaced by the runner-up, Barbu Ștefănescu, who could appear in uniform. For a while, he resented Ștefănescu, but they later became good friends.

In postwar Greater Romania, young Iliescu went on to study at Carol I High School, and debuted as a writer in 1924—with a piece taken up by Revista Tineretului. He recalled also sending his poems to Foaia Tinerimii and Cosânzeana of Cluj, but "they never published anything; not even an answer." Upon graduation, he left for Bucharest. He studied philosophy and letters at the city university, while also clerking at the Finance Ministry. Though struggling to make ends meet, he made a point of never skipping lectures by his favorite professors—including Mihail Dragomirescu (whom he regarded as slightly ridiculous, but a sound literary theorist), Vasile Pârvan ("a visionary"), Ovid Densusianu, Nicolae Cartojan, and Orest Tafrali.

Iliescu also became a regular at Tudor Arghezi's magazine, Bilete de Papagal, though without ever meeting his publisher. As observed by scholar Victor Durnea, his works for Bilete "do not evidence any sort of gift"; Durnea proposes that Iliescu only became a real poet later in life, after embracing surrealism. More leniently, sociologist Constantin Crișan notes his debt to Arghezian poetic language, as a prelude to his "forging his own poetic style." The aspiring poet took his diploma, magna cum laude, in January 1930, when he also gave up on clerking. He was afterwards a schoolteacher of Romanian and French, moving between Craiova, Calafat, Târgu Jiu, and ultimately Deva. While living in the latter town, he founded the journal Decebal and contributed to the local literary newspaper, Credință și Biruință.

=== Meridian circle ===
Iliescu had returned to Craiova by 1934, when he was teacher at Frații Buzești; he also handled the school library, assisted by his student (and future literary collaborator) Mihnea Gheorghiu. Iliescu was joined by Ion Mihăescu (or Mihăiescu) and Constant I. Manea in putting out a literary journal, Meridian. As he reported later, the two other men, while published authors, were mainly selected because of their good standing in society (since "I myself was a bohemian"). Manea was especially important to the enterprise since he lived on Copertarilor Street, and was thus a neighbor of the magazine's printer, Mitirel. Meridian appeared with several interruptions until 1946. Though provincial in focus, it became celebrated as a hub of modernist Romanian literature, and as such a landmark in national culture. According to poet and critic Dorin Tudoran, it was "one of the most spectacular avant-garde magazines" ever to be published in Romania. Iliescu looked back on the Meridian period as one of conscious rebellion: though he knew that poets, and especially modernists, risked "dying of hunger", he made a point of unsettling the local upper-classes, "who had no other concern than to sell grain, build themselves palaces, and have their bellies as big and full as possible." Another focus was on combating the cultural monopoly of Romanian nationalism, in its right-wing, traditionalist version. Iliescu thus claimed:

My great satisfaction is that I fought for the affirmation of a modernist movement in places dominated by many pranksters, by those folks who made our national specificity, which they interpreted backwards, I would even say stupidly, idyllically, into a pretext for their anti-artistic commercialism.

The magazine, published out of the Iliescu family home of Doamnei Street, was immediately controversial. It was also highly unpopular, as jocularly explained by Iliescu: "I would drop 7 copies at the bookstore, and returned to find 11." Over decades, he also held a grudge against elitist writers such as Eugen Lovinescu and Șerban Cioculescu, who had mocked Meridian's "grotesque" themes and punctuation errors (explained by Iliescu himself as jibes against Meridian's and his own samples of proletarian literature). In tandem, he found himself vilified by nationalists such as Nicolae Iorga and Nae Ionescu—but responded in kind, calling the former "a gladiator for rent", and the latter "a crusader from the fog", "immobile as a tree on some ravine." According to Durnea, such brief portraits, not all of them polemical, are Iliescu's most recognizable literary works; he also cites "caped prince" (for Alexandru Macedonski), "priest of the plains" (Nichifor Crainic), and "metropolitan musketeer" (Camil Petrescu). The critic observes however that Iliescu overdid himself in the genre, by employing "undue satirical twists", and especially by "overestimating the talent of some ideological allies".

Iliescu also left detail on the recruitment of various Meridian writers—claiming to have ensured there the debut of figures such as Gheorghiu, Alexandru Balaci, Ion Caraion, and Geo Dumitrescu. While most were rarely in direct contact with him, sending in their works from Bucharest, he memorized his personal encounter with Eugène Ionesco, whom he disliked. Iliescu only agreed to feature Ionesco's precisely because he was obnoxious in his interpersonal relations, a "nagging voice" to grate the bourgeoisie. Other more or less frequent contributors included Nissipeanu, Gheorghiu, Geo Bogza, Eugen Constant, Horia Lovinescu, Pericle Martinescu, Sașa Pană, Paul Păun, Stephan Roll, and Cicerone Theodorescu.

The exact nature of Iliescu's own political convictions at the time has been debated among critics. When Ileana Vrancea published one of his 1930s articles in a 1962 anthology of Marxist literary criticism, fellow scholar Nicolae Liu doubted that Iliescu was at all a Marxist at that stage, and for the next ten years. Iliescu himself described the interwar as a time of renewed contact with the proletariat: already "an intuitive communist, as I had been since childhood", he now became a secret adherent of Marxism-Leninism. The author of short prose, including a number of novellas, he was featured in various other magazines (such as Presa Olteniei, Poezia, Condeiul, and Știu). His debut volume came out in 1938 as a collection of mainly prose poems, Flori de frig ("Flowers of the Chill"), whose title may have been a nod to René Ghil and the Symbolist movement. As noted by academic Dumitru Micu, they are overall surrealist in tone—and among the more representative works of that species. The conservative establishment picked up on the book's leftist bias, and also disliked its avant-garde touches. As Iliescu himself noted, he was defended from calls for censorship by a number of young journalists—including Constant and Miron Radu Paraschivescu. In 1940, he published in Craiova his translation of Theodore Dreiser's novel, Jennie Gerhardt.

From 1938, Romania was governed by right-wing totalitarian regimes, going through the "National Renaissance Front" (1938–1940), the "National Legionary State" (1940–1941), and finally Ion Antonescu's military-led governments (1941–1944). When Antonescu tolerated criticism of the Iron Guard, including for its killing of Iorga, Iliescu published an homage to his former adversary. Therein, he voiced his regret for the "gladiator" remark, stating his respect for Iorga's final contributions as "an adviser with the prudence of ancient scribes." Literary historian Ioana Pârvulescu discusses the piece as one of the more obvious samples of changes in modernist discourse about Iorga—once dead, the savant was reclaimed as a quasi-democratic ally. As she writes:

Tiberiu Iliescu [now] writes a solemn, mythologizing article (all pronouns referring to the Professor are written in capital letters), with notes of remorse. The author feels the need to make a comparison precisely between Arghezi and Iorga, known more as antagonistic than kindred spirits [...]. Tiberiu Iliescu advances, perhaps even as his own pro domo, the following hypothesis: "I am sure that while detesting each other in public, they adored each other in secret [...] The two men, who were supposed to complement each other, had met, and the scruples of individual asperities kept them apart, but without contesting each other intimately."

=== World War II ===
Mihăescu, who had ended his collaboration with Iliescu in 1937, noted in a 1990s interview: "Meridian had begun, after 1940, to have a sort of communist vibe; it published a lot of those left-wing people." In one instance, Iliescu actively discouraged the perception that Petre Pandrea, a known Marxist author, was a Meridian backer; according to his account, Pandrea was mainly in Craiova as a philandering lawyer and a "wasteful" chatterer, who only joined the circle in earnest during 1942. Such lambasting was nuanced by Iliescu's son, Petruș Mircea—who was also Pandrea's godson. He argued that Pandrea, who was also his godfather, represented world-class literature at Meridian, and that his articles on Constantin Brâncuși consolidated the magazine's reputation. Memoirist Vlaicu Bârna (the author of one Meridian-featured poem) mainly notes the magazine for Pandrea's essays and for the texts sent in by Paraschivescu, who was a communist (and, as Bârna puts it, also a suspected NKVD plant).

Pandrea reports that Petruș Mircea was Iliescu's only son, but born from his friend's third marriage. He had also been present for the civil wedding, alongside Paraschivescu—and claims to have felt saddened that neither of them apparently took their vows seriously. The lawyer-diarist also claims that he did sponsor Meridian, paying its 25 staffers with funds extorted from a rich tanner out of Calafat, whom Pandrea had helped stay out of prison. Pandrea additionally claimed that Iliescu and the other Meridian writers were a cell of the anti-fascist resistance movement. He credits them, and himself, with having rescued as many as 300 anti-fascists and Jews, rounded up at Mediaș and facing trial in Craiova (in other estimates, he inflates this number to 1,000). As Pandrea notes, Iliescu, Balaci, Gheorghiu and Marcel Saraș networked in support of the prisoners, who were thus spared the death penalty.

In June 1941, Antonescu aligned Romania with Nazi Germany, engaging Romanian troops in the effort on the Eastern Front. Iliescu was drafted into the Romanian Land Forces and sent to the front; he was injured there, and sent home as an invalid. He was again active in Craiova during late October 1942, when Mihăescu reported that he was "awaiting in some ward to have a miraculous surgery." The same author noted the "great material and moral sacrifices" required for issuing Meridian, adding: "Tiberiu Iliescu's spirit of rebellion has pulled in resentments from all of the literary bourgeoisie". A former student, D. Marian, recalls attending a session of the Meridian literary circle, organized by Iliescu and Saraș while Romanian troops were being decimated at Stalingrad. Guests of this session included a Symbolist doyen, Ion Minulescu. As Marian notes:

Minulescu recited [his own] poems with the broad gestures of a perfect actor. [...] In the midst of the war, some passages from Glasul morilor seemed subversive, especially since a slogan circulating at the time was "peace, bread, freedom".

The publication had reemerged with new issues by March 1943. Chronicling this event for Timpul daily, Virgil Ierunca noted a massive drop in quality. He pleaded with Iliescu that he reverse the trend, by restoring one of the few "modern art magazines [that existed] in the poverty and drought of our serious publications". Pandrea reconnected with Iliescu at Dragomir's tavern in Bucharest, during mid-1943. Their meeting was also attended by Pandrea's brother-in-law, Lucrețiu Pătrășcanu, who was presiding over an underground cell of the Romanian Communist Party (PCR). As Pandrea recalls, "Tiberiu Iliescu had the unfortunate inspiration of dragging along Zalovici, his childhood friend, a Jew and graduate of law, who sold neckties". This event placed Iliescu at the center of an intrigue, which opened with Pătrășcanu storming out of the tavern, later explaining to Pandrea that Zalovici was spying on the Meridian cell for the Gestapo; Pandrea did not believe this to be true, until years later, when Zalovici confessed to him, and then to the authorities. He then realized that Pătrășcanu could have only known this from his friend, Belu Zilber, who was a double agent for the PCR and the Romanian Siguranța.

=== TNC manager and opinion leader ===
On 10 September 1944, just shortly after the anti-fascist coup of 23 August, Iliescu helped establish a coalition of Oltenian democratic schoolteachers. Together, they demanded unionization in their field of activity, as well as the elimination of far-right ideology in schools. On 24 October 1944, he was made chairman of the National Theater Craiova (TNC). This institution had been ravaged by fire in 1927, then suspended due to budget cuts in 1935, and finally reestablished in 1942—still without its only building, and doing its production with Carol I High School. During the Antonescu years, it had been led by Ștefan Boțoiu, whom the post-coup newspapers accused of fascist activities and embezzlement. Iliescu's takeover was welcomed by the left-wing daily, Ultima Oră, who reported that he was "finally" replacing someone installed "in a completely arbitrarily manner by the dictatorial regime, [...] a petty dictator who flaunted the common-sense of all Craiovan people".

During his time at the TNC, Iliescu promised (and, in his own assessment, also delivered) a familiarization of Craiova's public with ancient and modern dramatists, ranging from William Shakespeare, Alexander Pushkin and Maxim Gorky to Marcel Achard, Ayn Rand and George Mihail Zamfirescu. In November 1944, he organized a series of "experimental conferences" at the TNC, with lectures provided by Grigore Preoteasa (who discussed Tudor Vladimirescu's modern legacy) and Matei Cristescu (with musings about the literary aspects of French Resistance). Iliescu himself opened the 1944–1945 season with a rendition of The Lower Depths, praised by the Union of Patriots' Tribuna Poporului as "a beautiful first step on the road of his artistic fulfilment." In April 1945, the journalists at Fapta praised him for taking a chance with L'Annonce faite à Marie, by Paul Claudel (with Elena Sterienescu in the lead role). Asked what he was going to do if faced with rejection, Iliescu scoffed: "I will persevere, until Craiova's people will get used to having good things."

Petruș Mircea notes that, by 1944, his father's Doamnei home had become a rallying center for Craiova's intelligentsia. The building's walls were also decorated with canvasses painted by Corneliu Baba and Ștefan Hablinschi. In its final edition, Meridian resumed its mordant polemics with the Bucharest academics—in one issue, art historian Vasile Georgescu Paleolog debated Cioculescu over the exact meaning of "synesthesia". At that stage, Iliescu Sr was also an actor in the political takeover of Craiova and its Dolj hinterland, in support of the PCR. In February 1945, Meridian held its "literary matinee" at the TNC, with Gheorghe Duțulescu presenting his views on socialist ideology. Linguist Alexandru Niculescu, who was a Craiova student in March, reports seeing Iliescu and Saraș engineering the local uprising against the anti-communist Rădescu cabinet in March 1945; weapons in hand, they stormed into the prefecture, imposing Dumitru Cumpănașu as head of Dolj's administration.

In January 1946, Mihai Ralea, as Minister of Arts in the First Groza cabinet, made Iliescu an inspector of theaters in Oltenia "with his personal residence in Craiova". In May, he was inducted into the Romanian Writers' Society alongside a cohort of new members—also including Constant, Pandrea, Pătrășcanu, and Craiova's Ion Popescu-Polyctet. Though Iliescu boasted that Meridian was finally being read by the masses, his cultural status was being questioned outside their in-group. According to Liu, his preface to the TNC's program showed that he was still out-of-step with the PCR, in particular because it described the stage in non-political terms, as an instrument for "evading daily constraints." Allegations surfaced that he was only occasionally present at his office, and that during his tenure large portions of the inventory had been stolen (including carpeting and 153 lightbulbs).

=== Under early communism ===
As reported by critic and diarist Valentin Silvestru, Iliescu was much disliked by his actors, who, in 1946, prevented him from even entering his workplace. Geo Dumitrescu was sent in to take over as manager, albeit without official recognition. The news was recorded in the press on 2 November 1946, which noted that Dumitrescu had taken over after Iliescu had been reassigned to full-time inspector in the Ministry of Arts. Later records indicate his stint as an adviser for the Ministry of Education. When asked by Tudoran to explain the circumstances of his departure from the TNC, Iliescu presented it as a resignation:

The bourgeois regime no longer existed, but the habits it left behind were still strong. A new regime cannot automatically change mentalities. People carried on with their small machinations, their big slanders, their gossip, their denunciations, their anonymous letters. These had an effect. So I left the theater.

At the TNC, there was an unusually heated competition over who would replace Iliescu. It lasted to 22 February 1947, when Romuald Bulfinsky emerged as the winner. On 12 December 1946, in the aftermath of a legislative election in which the PCR claimed victory, Iliescu had attended a rally of the National Peasants' Party. Here, the Peasantist leader, Iuliu Maniu, publicized his discourse about widespread communist fraud, and insisted that the election be canceled.

The communist regime, fully established in the early days of 1948, did not welcome Iliescu into the nomenklatura. He moved to Bucharest, where he resumed work as a teacher, and, as Durnea notes, was "quasi-absent from literary life"; exceptions included his translation of Molière's classical play, Love-Tiff, published in a 1956 collection. Communist repression affected several members of the Meridian group, primarily including Pandrea. Arrested for his connections to Pătrășcanu (himself disgraced and executed), he spent the years 1948–1952 and 1958–1964 in communist confinement. In his diaries, Pandrea does not nominate Iliescu as one of his persecutors, instead invoking him as one of those whom the regime shunned, despite his and Meridian's support for young interwar communists; he held a grudge against the latter, nominating Gheorghiu as an opportunist. Mihăescu was similarly arrested by the Securitate in mid-1951, and held in various prisons, without trial, until 1956.

Pandrea and Iliescu were briefly reunited during the former's time out of prison, within a drinking circle that also included sculptor actor Ludovic Antal, journalist Emil Serghie, philosopher Sorin Pavel, and sculptor Ion Vlad. In that context, Pandrea reports that his friend was a heavy, unrepentant drinker, who chided Baba for having "betrayed" the bohemian life. Such stances enraged Vlad, who argued that Baba was at liberty to do as he pleased, and that artists needed their prolonged solitudes. The two figures also quarreled over matters of literary history, in which Iliescu, to Vlad's indignation and against popular belief, suggested that the peasant raconteur, Ion Creangă had never been a good friend to the national poet, Mihai Eminescu.

During Pandrea's second imprisonment, Iliescu found himself treated with suspicion in official circles. In March 1960, he returned to Craiova to visit his relatives, and to reconnect with friends such as Gheorghiu; also joining him was Claudiu Moldovan, head of the Oltenia Philharmonic. An anonymous communist informant denounced them for drinking heavily at Bobocică's tavern, where Iliescu spoke in French. Moldovan was handed the note and decided to publish it in 1982, for his and his readers' amusement; in the accompanying article, he explained that Iliescu was reciting from Paul Verlaine.

=== Retirement and final return ===
Official biographies mention Iliescu's time as headmaster of Mihai Viteazul High School. In 1963, he took his retirement from that same institution. The second half of that decade witnessed his reappraisal. His Meridian career was revisited by critic Smaranda Rădulescu in a 1966 article for Ramuri (Iliescu himself agreed with the assessment of his journal as a progressive voice). The same year, Mihăescu and Ion Sofia Manolescu had established a private literary museum in Alexandria. The news was picked up by Astra journal, which credited Mihăescu as one "who—during those dictatorial years—, and alongside Tiberiu Iliescu, curated the audacious magazine that was Meridian".

In 1968, Iliescu republished and expanded Flori de frig under a new title, La cocoșul spânzurat ("At the Hanged Rooster"). Its new parts were, according to Crișan, a veritable "essay in literary psychology", with echoes from Arghezi and George Călinescu, and with notes on authors from Edgar Allan Poe and Virginia Woolf to Urmuz. The book was received with some displeasure by Sebastian Costin of Scînteia Tineretului, who proposed that its state-run publisher, Editura pentru literatură, had more important writers to include in its author series:

We do not know—and therefore will not challenge—the quality of Tiberiu Iliescu's journalism. But are there no other collections at Editura pentru literatură in which names such as his could feel more at ease?

Iliescu's third and final volume, published in 1970, was in the reportage genre—called De la Porțile de Fier la Poarta sărutului ("From the Iron Gates to the Gate of the Kiss"), it was described by the author himself as "a passionate incantation for magnificent Oltenia, evoking landscapes, events, memorable people, monuments and epochal achievements." He declared his literary models to have been the local classics of travel writing: Bogdan Petriceicu Hasdeu, Alexandru Odobescu, and Alexandru Vlahuță; Durnea instead sees it as a pastiche from Geo Bogza, but done "without Bogza's artistry." By October 1972, Iliescu had been welcomed into the Bucharest chapter of the Writers' Union of Romania (USR), frequenting its prose section—led at the time by novelist Fănuș Neagu. In September 1973, Iliescu had handed a manuscript of biographies and travelogues to be published at Editura Eminescu (as Cartea regilor particulari, "The Book of Private Kings"), and was preparing a new edition of the Love-Tiff, at Biblioteca pentru toți (within Editura Minerva).

Iliescu had sold his Doamnei Street home soon after his mother's death. In 1976, when he was interviewed by Tudoran for Luceafărul, he was living at No. 2 Lotrioara Alley, in Titan (eastern Bucharest). His house was fitted with a large bust of Charles Baudelaire, a poet whom he called "my obsession". The writer himself died in Bucharest on 12 April 1978, in reportedly unexpected circumstances, "with a smile on his face". This was announced to the world by his surviving brothers (Mircea and Grigore), by his widow Florica, as well as by children Anca and Petruș Mircea. Both children emigrated a while after. Petruș Mircea settled in Sweden and was allowed to finish his studies there, becoming an expert in Eastern Orthodox church architecture.

== Legacy ==
The funeral ceremony, partly organized by the USR, was held at Străulești II Cemetery on 15 April. In penning the obituary, the Union paid homage to Meridian as "a literary magazine with an anti-fascist stance, [...] in whose pages were published all writers who fought against the fascist regime." An Oltenian poetic anthology, edited in 1982 by Justin Constantinescu and Ion Deaconescu, only mentioned Iliescu, instead of sampling him, adding that he was among those still "honing their craft"; the issue was noted by Iliescu's old adversary, Șerban Cioculescu, who informed them that Iliescu had "died not so long ago, at over 70 years of age, [as] a steadfast representative of avant-garde poetry" (as Cioculescu observed, the anthologists had most likely been "scared off by Tiberiu Iliescu's showboating"). The "honing their craft" remark was also discussed by Săptămîna columnist Artur Silvestri as one of several aspects that made the book scarcely quotable, and overall a document in "involuntary mystification".

Iliescu was entirely absent from Marin Mincu's 1983 anthology of local avant-garde literature. This was noted by the Craiova neo-modernist poet, Marin Sorescu, who argued that Mincu should have taken away from the chapter on Virgil Teodorescu, which was "as big as an average booklet." A biographical dictionary produced by Florea Firan in 1986 introduced another confusion, which was derided in the local press: it presented a caricature of Iliescu, done by his friend Neagu Rădulescu, as if drawn by Urmuz (who was already dead when Iliescu was debuting).

Several aspects of Iliescu's life and career were revisited after the Romanian Revolution of 1989. In a 1997 interview, his son Petruș Mircea reported still not knowing what had happened to his father's sizable art collection. In 2006, Xenia Karo published in Craiova a selection of Iliescu Sr's works, as Pagini alese. Later that year, Karo also produced a critical monograph. It won her a special prize of Mozaicul review, with funds provided by Petruș Mircea—who returned from Stockholm to give his own lectures about his father. By 2011, he was engaging in publicized disputes with Tudoran, accusing him of having illegally used the Meridian trademark for his own magazine; Tudoran argued that the name had been used by other Romanian publications, before 1934, and that his own journal, covering the Romanian diaspora, was in any case not subject to local commercial law. Tudoran also answered Iliescu Jr's other claim, namely that he had ignored his father's work in articles covering Meridian—Tudoran noted that he had dedicated Iliescu Sr fifteen pages in one of his books, and therefore that he was the author most involved in keeping alive his legacy.
