= Eugen Constant =

Romanian writer and labor organizer (1890–1975)

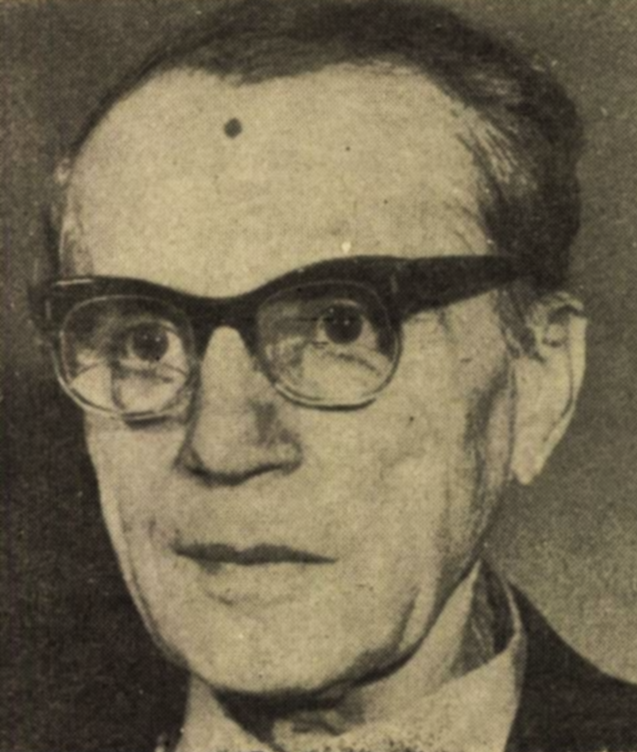
- Constant in 1966
- Born: Eugen Constantinescu; 25 October 1890; Craiova, Kingdom of Romania
- Died: 27 February 1975 (aged 84); Craiova, Socialist Republic of Romania
- Occupations: Journalist; activist; accountant; civil servant; schoolteacher
- Writing career
- Period: c. 1917–1973
- Genres: Lyric poetry; sonnet; social poetry; political poetry; satire; social novel; essay; memoir; biography; verse drama
- Literary movement: Symbolism (Romanian); Proletarian literature; Neo-romanticism; Neo-classicism

Eugen Constant (né Constantinescu; 25 October 1890 – 27 February 1975) was a Craiova-based Romanian writer, labor organizer, and political activist. Born into relative poverty, he was trained as an accountant and worked for long as a teacher in trade schools. He was called up under arms during World War I, making his debut as a poet at Iași, in 1917. His early works alternated between displays of Romanian nationalism and themes borrowed from the Symbolists; he was often seen, by both contemporaries and later reviewers, as a minor, indigestible poet, and his one social novel, published in 1935, was similarly panned. Eugen's output, like that of his brothers Paul and Savin, largely illustrated the author's leftist convictions and tropes, showing influences from Marxism; during the 1920s and into the Great Depression, he was in permanent contact with the Romanian Communist Party, which directed his contributions in trade unionism. He took a public stand in defense of workers and activists during the Grivița Strike of 1933, his propaganda leading to his near-prosecution by the Romanian monarchy.

Despite stints with his brother Paul in Sibiu, where he founded two literary magazines, and after making failed attempts to take up work in Bucharest, Eugen Constant remained attached to Craiova. He was affiliated with local journals, including Năzuința and Radical, before creating his own, Condeiul, publishing it until after the break of World War II. His socialism apparently toned down during the late 1930s and early 1940s, and he revived his nationalism; possibly sympathetic to the Iron Guard, he was kept on by Ion Antonescu's dictatorship, serving as a factory leader of the state-run leisure service. He turned back toward socialism immediately after anti-fascist coup of August 1944, joining the newly established Union of Patriots, and endorsing the communists' mounting control of Romanian society. The communist regime granted him favors, especially during his old age. His contributions to proletarian literature were generally considered as not up to the aesthetic standard, despite his enthusiastic support for communist policies.

== Biography ==
=== Early life ===
Born in Craiova on 25 October 1890, Eugen Constantinescu had eight siblings, four of whom also became writers: Iancu, Paul (1895–1981), Dumitru "Savin" (1902–1928), and Lucia. Their father was Dumitru Constantinescu, a quilter, and their mother was Eufrosina née Ghindeanu. Eugen's childhood was spent at his father's rented apartment on Craiova's Copertari Street, which he described as a place for "industrious artisans" and "workers macerated by a horrible capitalist exploitation", and where he was made to prioritize learning over any other activity, including play. Showing some gifts for music, he was for a while a choirboy in Elie Michăilescu's ensemble. His family, however, restricted his career choices to accounting: he attended a local commercial school in 1902–1904, then enlisted at the Gheorghe Chițu Higher School of Commerce, taking his graduation diploma in 1909. His teacher of history and political economy was Vasile Mihăilescu, who took a public stand in support of the 1907 Romanian peasants' revolt, and spent time in prison as a result. E. Constant notes that he had feared for Mihăilescu's life, but also that he had ignored his political opinions, his standing as a "visionary of the new social order", until he himself had become a leftist. He was at the time seeking advice from the celebrated novelist, Mihail Sadoveanu, with whom he had correspondence in 1903.

Eugen fought and withdrew with the Romanian Land Forces during the invasion of 1916–1917, when Craiova and the whole of Oltenia came to be occupied by the Central Powers. He was for long stationed in Western Moldavia, at Iași, where he debuted as a poet—his first published sonnet, La datorie, was distinctly nationalistic in content. Overall, however, his poems were in line with the Symbolist movement, with critics pointing to similarities with George Bacovia. Young Constant was indebted to Charles Baudelaire and Alexandru Macedonski, the latter of whom he always admired as a poet of "social revolt", "entirely devoted to the people's cause". He viewed himself as primarily influenced by a Craiova author, Traian Demetrescu. As read by critic Florin Faifer, Constant's first published contributions show him to be "depressive and skeptical", "a misanthrope and misogynist", depicting "a world of shadows that merges the odd and the grotesque." The early Constant only abandons this setting when he explores natural landscapes, or in samples of "social poetry", where he is energized by his hatred of the upper classes.

Still at Iași, Eugen presented his works to Mihai Codreanu, the consecrated Parnassian, who reportedly enjoyed them and treated him as a literary colleague. Upon his return with the end of war (and the establishment of Greater Romania), he had relocated back to his old home on Copertari; Paul, who had reached an officer's rank, settled at Sibiu in Transylvania. Eugen also rejoined Chițu School in 1918, and served for one year as a teacher of Romanian language. He was standing in for Mihail Cruceanu, whom he had met at a socialist rally held during that year; as he explains in his memoirs of the encounter, Cruceanu had asked him to take over "for a couple of days", since he had been delegated at the inaugural congress of the Romanian Communist Party (PCR), but ended up being arrested and tried.

Still using his birth name Eugen Constantinescu, he issued his sonnets as Oglinzi aburite ("Blurred Mirrors") in 1918. In May 1919, he became a regular at Ramuri magazine, having been invited there by poet Elena Farago; alongside Cruceanu, he attended sessions held in Farago's house, whereby they discussed the option of setting up a regional trade union of literary professionals. According to Constant, he himself was "disoriented" about the labor movement until his meetings with PCR members—which began in "winter 1921". Cruceanu introduced him to Marxism, providing him with samples of works by Karl Marx, Vladimir Lenin, and Nikolai Bukharin.

=== 1920s politics ===
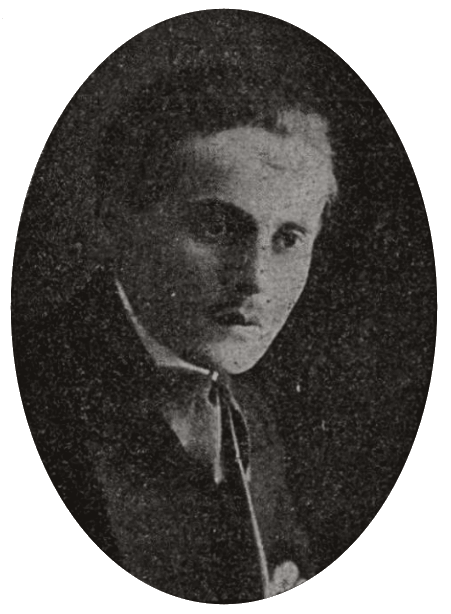
Constant in 1923

Later in the 1920s, as Farago had established a new magazine, called Năzuința, Eugen became a regular; he was also acquainted with another Năzuința writer, Ion Dongorozi, whose novel he reviewed in a 1922 issue of Flamura magazine. Farago promoted the Constants: Savin was a regular, while Eugen was published with an entire volume, Galerii de ceară ("Wax Exhibits"). It appeared in 1924, and was the first book to feature his pseudonymous signature. It was also immediately censured by critic George Baiculescu, who declared his astonishment that Farago had allowed such "absurdities" to appear under her aegis. According to Baiculescu, only some small portions of Galerii de ceară resembled genuine poetry, while the rest put a reader's patience to the absolute test. During this period, Savin debuted as a poet, with lyrics that contained explicitly Marxist messages. Seen by his brothers as the most gifted of the Constantinescu-Constant family, he was retained at the University of Bucharest to serve as assistant professor to Mihail Dragomirescu.

In 1926, Eugen joined Paul and Savin Constant in publishing a collective volume, known simply as Poezii ("Poems"); his chapter was titled Amurg prin vitralii ("A Sunset in Stained Glass"). He was keeping books for Gheorghe Negrețu and his "Orient Bank", later recalling that he was being paid "sporadically" for his services. It was then that Dongorozi, who had become manager of the National Theater Craiova (TNC), took him along as the troupe's accountant. He also attended literary soirees at that institution, including one in which the celebrated Tudor Arghezi and Nicolae M. Condiescu read out samples from Arghezi's work. In time, he himself was published in Arghezi's magazine, Bilete de Papagal. His TNC tenure, during which he tried to reform the finances, ended abruptly in 1928, after the entire building had been destroyed in a "mysterious fire" (possibly started by an usher's stove). In October of that year, Eugen and Paul lost their brother Savin, who was crushed and killed in a train collision at Recea. A friend, the poet Nicolae Milcu, happened to be riding one of the trains involved; he was unscathed, but also died, of tuberculosis, in 1930.

For about fifteen years, Eugen was a teacher at the Obedeanu school for tanners. He spoke at the school's end-of-year festivities in July 1929, using the rostrum to denounce capitalist exploitation, and being identified by his colleagues as the voice of "warm and sincere socialism". He was let go with pay by the TNC, but in November 1930 served as accountant for Madona Dudu Church. By his own account, he had a "notorious" confrontation with the church caretakers, who were also landowners. Beyond Ramuri, he was a regular in many regional magazines and newspapers, either under his main pseudonym or with various others (Inimosu, Evghenie, Silvirgil, Condeierul, Vulcan). New venues that featured his work included the modernist Radical, put out in Craiova by Constantin Nissipeanu and Ionathan X. Uranus; for a while, he was editor of his own publications—Garda ("The Guard", 1928–1931) and Strigătul Oltean ("The Oltenian Yell", 1929). When historian Constantin S. Nicolăescu-Plopșor decided to publish his own journal, as Pământ și Suflet Oltenesc, Constant reportedly helped him with proceeds from his literary conferences.

In a 1929 volume called Punte peste veacuri ("Bridge over Centuries"), E. Constant issued poems that, according to the critic Constantin Șăineanu, displayed "a talent that would be better suited to another cause". As Șăineanu observes, the volume was utterly pessimistic and "devoid of any profound ideas", and thus could only appeal to "those who have failed at life". In 1930, Constant collected his political essays and his literary criticism in Încrustări în rama bibliotecii ("Inlays on the Bookcase Frame"). The Universul house critic, Paul I. Papadopol, reserved some praise for this collection, which showed its author's "sincerity [and] taste". He recommended Încrustări as "a useful guide for all those seeking to understand Romanian literature as it was in the year 1930." According to Faifer, the volume's "leftist vehemence" and lampoon-like qualities are extreme, especially given that Constant's style is also needlessly complicated, or "Gongoristic". Alongside Paul Constant, Eugen also edited the Sibiu-based magazines Provincia Literară and Armonia Literară (1932–1934). He self-published the poetic series Cu dalta pe lespezi ("Chisel on Slabs"), which won encouragement from Papadopol. He read the pieces as fundamentally neo-romantic and neo-classical, highlighting Constant's use of the amphibrach, and viewing him as a better poet than he was a satirist. During this period, E. Constant focused his attention on the TNC, which was managed by A. de Herz. He described Herz as "entirely adverse to the Oltenian psyche", implied that he was guilty of embezzlement, and claimed that the plays he staged at the TNC were only notable for their "nudist displays and libidinous gestures".

=== As a "jobless intellectual" ===
In the early 1930s, E. Constant was serving as chairman of the United Workers' Syndicates; shortly after the Grivița Strike of 1933, he produced his poetry volume Socluri devastate ("Dados Destroyed"), which he himself described as a document of "proletarian rage". Published at no charge to Constant by a workers' cooperative, it provoked the political establishment with its mock-dedication to Virgil Potârcă (one of the politicians who had quashed the strike), addressed as "thou oppressor of the working class". In 1934, while serving with Cruceanu on Craiova's Anti-Fascist Committee, Eugen became a staff member of the union magazine Apărarea Ceferiștilor ("In Defense of the CFR-Workers"), outlining there his beliefs regarding class conflict. He himself later depicted himself as an outside ally of the PCR, answering that group's call to "fashion poetry into a weapon, to be used against the enemies of the workers and their cause." As PCR men and striking unionists had been brought to trial in Craiova, the poet established a committee of support for the prisoners. The newspaper, which was secretly curated by a PCR cadre, hosted Constant and Victor Eftimiu's letters of protest; these were simultaneously published in Clopotul, put out by the PCR man Scarlat Callimachi of Botoșani. In his version of the text, Constant noted his own history of "frantically flogging the parasitical elements who disparaged work and who never did more than to live on its extracted essence."

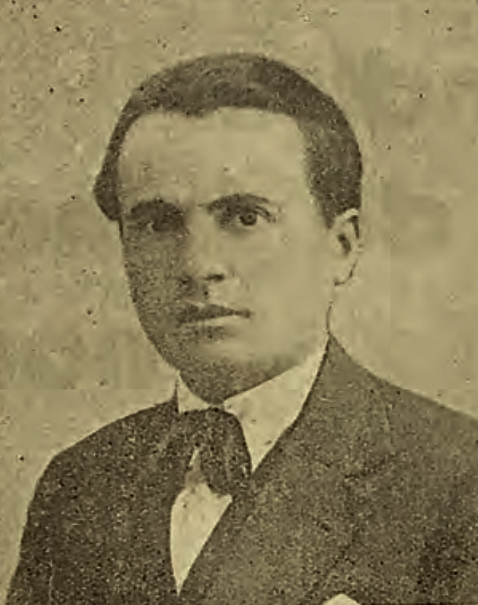
Author's portrait, as included in the original edition of Condicar de lume nouă

Such positioning made Constant relevant to the main left-wing circles in Bucharest. He claims to have been invited by Sadoveanu to become a permanent editor of the national daily Adevărul, but reports that he ultimately lost this opportunity when one of his children fell ill, requiring him to stay in Craiova. He decided instead to focus on improving Craiova's standing as a center for socialist culture. For most of the Great Depression, E. Constant survived as (in his own words) a "jobless intellectual". By his own account, he was investigated for his seditious poems, and appeared before a young examining magistrate. The interrogations turned out in his favor: the judge was persuaded about the validity of Marxism, renounced his position in the state apparatus, and later joined Constant's own editorial team at an "independent opinion newspaper". Constant's own polemical articles were heavily influenced by Arghezi and Geo Bogza.

Constant was still a hero in nationalist circles: in 1935, Gabriel Drăgan, who put out the bimonthly Reacțiunea Literară, described him as a pure poet from the provinces, untouched by modern decadence. Drăgan recommended and published Constant as a hero to his circle, seeing him as compatible with Bazil Gruia, Victor Papilian, and Sandu Teleajen. For his part, Constant became explicitly anti-fascist, mocking Adolf Hitler (as "Handsome Adolf"). He was inspired by the social and political climate of his day when writing his social novel, the 1935 Condicar de lume nouă ("Chronicler of a New World"). Though well-liked by the columnists at Curentul daily for its "truthful, often cruel" light on contemporary life, it is described by Faifer as a flop: "Overflowing with bile, [it] cannot hide its author's vengeful thoughts. Venom, pettiness, grudges and spite betray the ulcerating sensitivities of one misfit, his head filled with illusions." Similar themes were explored by Paul Constant in his own novel, Râia ("Scabies"). Published in 1936, it had more success, earning him a prize from the Romanian Academy.

Eugen made his debut in verse drama in 1938, with Pământ blagoslovit ("Blessed Earth")—noted by Curentul for its "patriotic enthusiasm", it showed an elderly schoolteacher instructing youths to ready themselves for death in defense of Romania's borders. In 1940, he put out a second and final volume of Încrustări. At Condeiul ("The Pen") magazine, which he published in 1938–1942, he outlined his defense of Arghezi's modernist novel, Ochii Maicii Domnului, which, he later claimed, was also meant as an attack on Arghezi's fascist enemies. He similarly upheld the Jewish author Felix Aderca, whom the nationalist press had claimed to expose as a pornographer. Despite his earlier endorsement of Constant's poems, Papadopol, having turned nationalist, argued that Constant was the only person who still regarded Aderca as a talented author, and wondered if the two men were not in fact related to each other. Constant and Papadopol had a publicized quarrel with one another, largely centered on Constant's rejection of his putative labeling as an "anarchic poet", in line with Arghezi. Papadopol reacted by noting that he had never viewed Constant as significant enough to be one of the incriminated category, suggesting that he was merely involving himself in the cultural debate for simply being "fidgety". To Constant's delight, his poetry was positively reviewed by the senior scholar C. D. Fortunescu in the regional journal, Arhivele Olteniei (December 1938 issue). Fortunescu described him as a poet of "revolt against a human order that is based on lies"—words seen by Constant as proof that Fortunescu was a man of "progressive conceptions".

=== World War II and communist era ===
Historian Roland Clark notes that E. Constant had at least a dose of sympathy for fascism, and "links to the Iron Guard", given his participation in the January 1938 funeral procession for Guardist Maria Cristescu. During the early stages of World War II, he worked for publications that had been vetted by Ion Antonescu's dictatorship. In April 1941, he issued Vestitorii ("The Announcers"), a "magazine for nationalist doctrine" that featured contributions from Dan Botta, Virgil Carianopol, and Ion Filotti Cantacuzino. In 1943, he published another poetry volume, Elanuri răstignite ("Crucified Impulses"). He was working as an accountant at the army's tannery in Bucovăț. In November 1943, he was also leading the factory branch of the "Labor and Light" leisure service, advising workers about the importance of Christian worship. In this capacity, he also organized a benefit show for the Craiova workers. As he reports, he had a hard time being accepted by his superiors, since he had been noted as a "democratic writer", and since he clearly resented the country's alliance with Nazi Germany. He therefore welcomed the anti-fascist coup of 23 August, and the subsequent leftward shift in Romanian politics, as a "restoration of the country's dignity".

Immediately after the coup, Constant became a registered member of the PCR-aligned Union of Patriots (UP). He also played a part in setting up the PCR's own local daily, Înainte, which published its first issue on 3 September; PCR activist Ion Popescu-Puțuri was the head editor. Before the end of 1944, the Romanian Social Democratic Party had established its regional organ, Oltenia Muncitoare, which had E. Constant as both a regular contributor and editor. In October, after Tiberiu Iliescu took over as manager of the TNC, he began serving on its readership committee, which decided on which plays would enter production; he returned to that position for the 1947–1948 season, and was sole literary secretary of the TNC in 1949–1950. Constant spoke at numerous public rallies of the UP and the Bloc of Democratic Parties, including one held at the TNC, and was elected as factory representative by Bucovăț's tanners. His own Muzica stelelor ("Music of the Stars"), another work of verse drama, was performed in June 1945 at Craiova—not by the TNC, but by an amateur troupe tied to the UP. It appeared in print in 1947.

Constantinescu was admitted into the revamped Romanian Writers' Society in May 1946. In 1950, after the Romanian communized republic had been established, "Eugen Constant" was officially recognized as his legal name. In 1957, when he was visited by a teen-aged poet Darie Novăceanu, he was inhabiting a house outside Romanescu Park—his family home on Copertari having by then been befallen by an "unjust indifference". Novăceanu sought to re-popularize Constant's poetry, managing to have some of his peasant-themed verse hosted in publications that commemorated the 1907 uprisings. In November 1959, Contemporanul magazine rejected his "Song of the Bricklayer", describing it as "a lengthy assemblage of stanzas that gathers, without selectivity or significance, facts and aspects of labor." At around that time, Paul was publishing a series of hajduk-themed novels that were imbued with communist imagery. An anthology grouping Eugen's verse and various articles only appeared in 1964, followed in 1967 by another such collection, Gravuri și rezonanțe ("Engravings and Resonances").

Retrospective editions of Constant's lifelong poetry were issued by Bucharest's Editura pentru literatură in 1965 and 1968. In a 1966 interview for Ramuri, he attested to his work in celebrating "all those forces that are engaged in cementing happiness, under the party's judicious leadership." Journalist Vartan Arachelian asserted that such writings "cannot stand a test of values, enduring only as a document". Revisited by Faifer in 2016, the post-1944 pieces appeared "celebratory to the point of where they are no longer poetry." The senior writer was a reading guest at Craiova's "Macedonski Days" festival of May 1970, alongside Cruceanu, Carianopol, Nissipeanu, Marin Sorescu, and Leonid Dimov. On 29 January 1971, President Nicolae Ceaușescu awarded him the Meritul Cultural medal, first class. The following year, interviewed by Radio Romania's department of oral history, Constant contributed directly to Ceaușescu's cult of personality, claiming to have met, and to have been impressed by, the future state leader in 1934, when Ceaușescu was a teen-aged PCR militant. His final play, Făclierii ("The Torchbearers"), was put out by Înainte in 1972; like all of his work in the field, it is dismissed by Faifer as "wholly insignificant." In 1973, he collected other samples of his interwar writing, reissuing them as Vibrații republicane ("Republican Vibrations"). He died in Craiova on 27 February 1975, almost six years ahead of Paul Constant, and was buried at Ungureni Cemetery on 2 March.

== Legacy ==
Eugen Constant was outlived by his wife, Raisa, and by their son and daughter—Virgil and Silvia. Over the late 1970s, Novăceanu maintained interest in his poetry and prose. In 1980, he collaborated with Scrisul Românesc on publishing a selection of the deceased poet's verse, before an edition of his biographies and memoirs (collected as Evocări). The latter work is panned by Faifer, who notes its "overdone sociological touches". In 1983, Silvia Constant donated some fifty items from her father's belongings to the Museum of Oltenia—some became part of its permanent exhibit. By then, the Dolj County Library was managing the "Eugen Constant Literary Club". After the end of communism in 1989, Constant still had a following in his native city, with his centennial being marked by a public gathering with speeches by Florea Firan and Valeriu Râpeanu. In April 2001, a memorial plaque was added to the poet's final home on Eroilor Street, which was still inhabited by his daughter.
