= Traian National College =

High school in Drobeta-Turnu Severin, Romania

Coordinates: 44°37′26″N 22°39′34″E

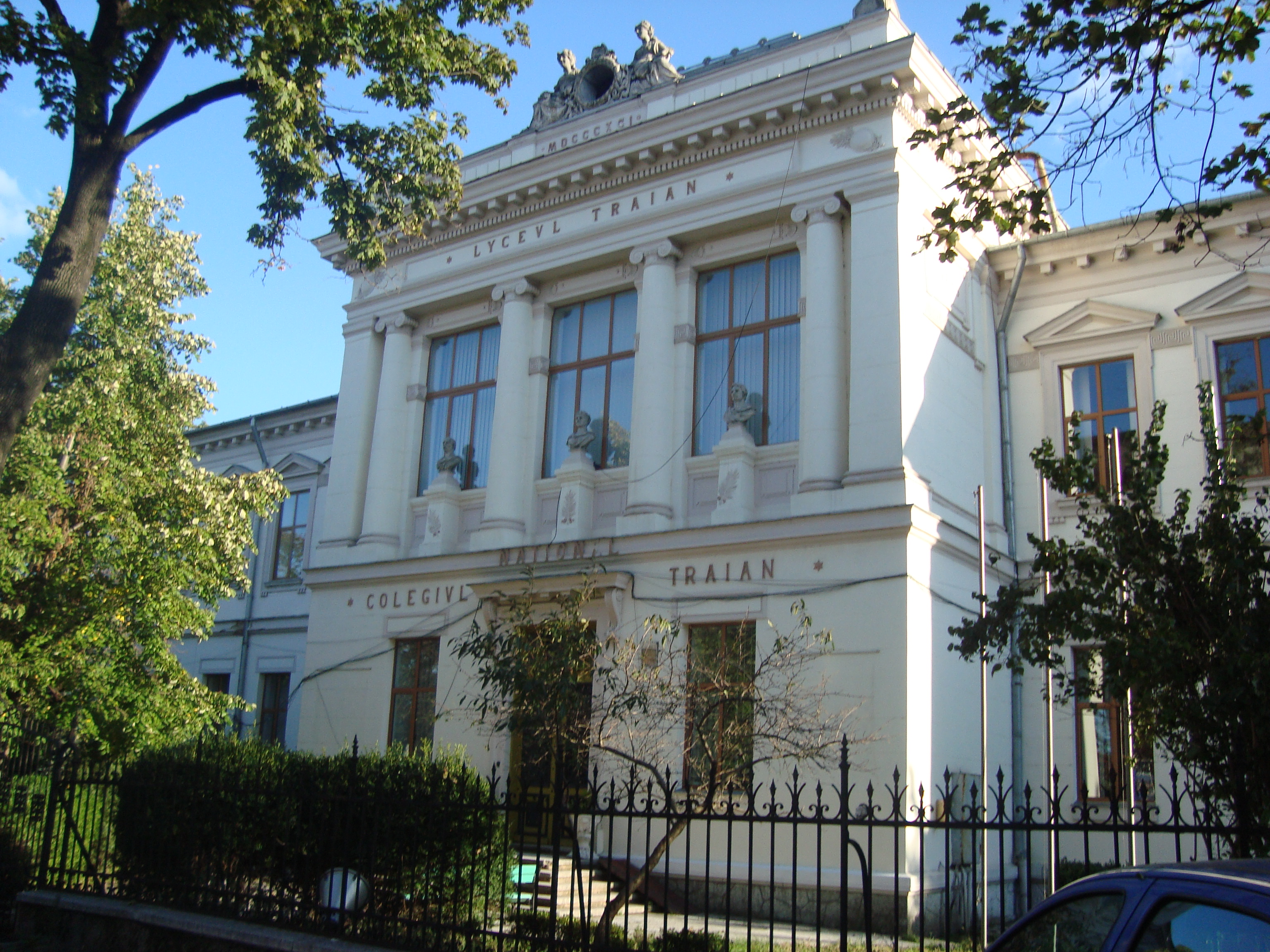
Traian National College

Traian National College (Romanian: Colegiul Național Traian) is a high school located at 6 Carol I Boulevard in Drobeta-Turnu Severin, Romania.

The idea of a high school for Turnu Severin appeared in 1864, when the nascent Romanian state implemented an education reform; at the time, local students had to go to Craiova or elsewhere for high school. A normal school opened in 1877; it was named after the Roman emperor Trajan due to his association with the local Trajan's Bridge. Meanwhile, an apprentices' school was founded in 1872. The two institutions had shut down by 1883, when their furniture and books were used to establish a new gymnasium. The first years were difficult: the school was located in several rented buildings and in the old town hall; there were a maximum of four teachers for nearly 80 students.

A permanent building, designed by Alexandru Săvulescu, was approved in 1890. Prime Minister Gheorghe Manu attended the groundbreaking, alongside Bogdan Petriceicu Hasdeu, sent by the Education Ministry. Construction proceeded quickly, with the final touches made in late 1891. An attempt to rename the school after Neagoe Basarab was soon dropped. Theodor Costescu, who arrived in 1892, is considered the key figure in the school's early years. He was responsible for introducing a uniform in 1893 and opening a library in 1896. He also designed a garden with flowers and bushes brought from the Mühle House in Timișoara, Austria-Hungary; this was completed in 1899. He was dismissed as principal later that year after a change in government. King Carol I visited in 1897.

In 1902, a bronze bust of Carol I, sculpted by an alumnus who had settled in Italy, was placed on a pedestal of Ravenna granite and set up at the school. During World War I, when the area was occupied by the Central Powers, part of the teachers continued to work, while others withdrew to the Western Moldavia region, along with the government. Several students and teachers enlisted in the Romanian Army, while a few teachers, including George Oprescu, were detained in German camps located in Bulgaria. A school stadium was completed in 1923, and a dormitory, now a museum, in 1926. A new, easterly wing was built between 1937 and 1948. In March 1949, early during the communist regime, Gheorghe Eftimiu and Ion Bocârnea, two 12th-grade students who belonged to the anti-communist resistance movement, were executed in Isverna forest. Over the ensuing decade and a half, three teachers as well as alumni died in prison. A bust of Mihai Eminescu was inaugurated in 1958, and a statue of Costescu and a student in 1972. The western wing opened in 2003. Around 1000 students in grades 9 through 12 attend the school.

Alumni include Gheorghe Ionescu-Sisești, Șerban Cioculescu, Ștefan Odobleja, Ioan-Iovitz Popescu, Victor Gomoiu, Ecaterina Andronescu, Mihai Stănișoară, Geo Saizescu Lascăr Vorel, and Al. C. Calotescu-Neicu. The school building is listed as a historic monument by Romania's Ministry of Culture and Religious Affairs.
