= Theodor Costescu =

Romanian educator and politician

Teodor D. Costescu (March 15, 1864 – March 25, 1939) was a Romanian educator and politician.

Costescu was born in Rovinari. After graduating from the University of Bucharest with a degree in natural sciences, he became a teacher at Craiova in 1887. He then transferred to Traian High School in Turnu Severin, building up the new institution. He was responsible for several new school buildings in the local Mehedinți County. Costescu served the county as prefect, senator and, from 1912, Conservative-Democratic deputy. In 1934, he was elected an honorary member of the Romanian Academy. He served as a general secretary in the Ministry of Industry.
