= Elena Farago =

Romanian poet, translator and children's author (1878 - 1954)

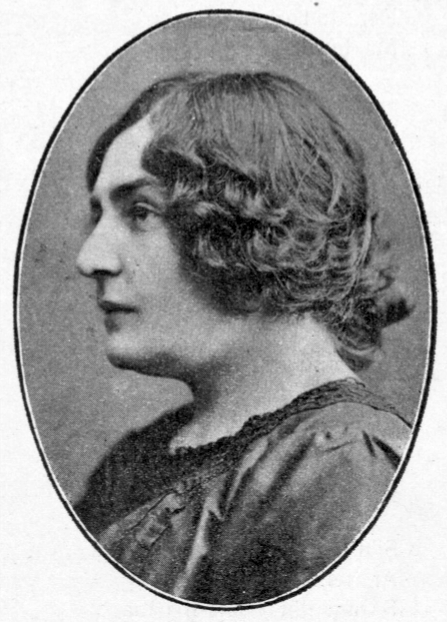
- Born: 29 March 1878 Bârlad, Romania
- Died: 3 January 1954 (aged 75) Craiova, Romania
- Occupation: Poet; children's author; translator
- Genre: Poetry; children's literature

Elena Farago (born Elena Paximade; 29 March 1878 – 3 January 1954) was a Romanian poet and children's author. She also translated works by Ibsen, Nietzsche, Maeterlinck and numerous others into Romanian.

== Early life and education ==
Born in Bârlad, her parents were Francisc Paximade, who came from Tenedos and established a cereal export business at Galați, and Anastasia (née Thomaide); the two married in 1873. On her father's side, she descended from an old and noble Greek family; through her mother, she was of Greek, Turkish and Romanian origin. Orphaned at a young age, she was raised in the home of Junimist George Panu and briefly with Ion Luca Caragiale, through whom she came to know Alexandru Vlahuță and other contemporary writers. Between 1884 and 1890, she had an incomplete education at the Varlaam and Drouhet boarding schools in her native town. Through her husband, the bank clerk Francisc Farago, she was drawn into socialist circles, attending lectures by Ioan Nădejde, Constantin Dobrogeanu-Gherea, Vasile Morțun and Constantin Stere, also meeting Barbu Brănișteanu and Christian Rakovsky.

== Career ==
She made her debut with the 1899 poem "Gândul trudiților", which appeared in România muncitoare. Her work also appeared in Adevărul, Epoca, Sămănătorul, Floarea darurilor, Revista noastră, Făt-Frumos, Luceafărul and Ramuri. She sometimes signed with the pen names Fatma, Andaluza and Ellen. From 1921 until her death, she headed the Alexandru and Aurelia Aman foundation in Craiova, which today is the Elena Farago Memorial House. She also worked as an inspector for children's charity homes. Farago founded Năzuința magazine in 1922.

Her first book was Versuri (1906), followed by poetry volumes Șoapte din umbră (1908), Șoaptele amurgului (1920) and Nu mi-am plecat genunchii (1926); these reappeared in editions she put together (Poezii alese, 1924; Poezii. 1906-1926, 1928; Poezii, 1937), or posthumously, in partly re-edited versions (Poezii, 1957; Versuri, 1978). Farago also published poems for children (Pentru copii, vol. I, 1913, vol. II, 1920; Copiilor, 1913; Din traista lui Moș Crăciun, 1920; Bobocica, 1921; Să nu plângem, 1921; A ciocnit cu ou de lemn, 1943; Într-o noapte de Crăciun, 1944; 4 gâște năzdrăvane, 1944; Plugușorul jucăriilor, 1944), and children's prose books (Să fim buni, 1922; Ziarul unui motan, 1924; Într-un cuib de rândunică, 1926; Să nu minți, să nu furi, 1944).

She translated from Henrik Ibsen, Friedrich Nietzsche, Catulle Mendès, French classical and symbolist poetry (Emile Verhaeren, Henri de Régnier, Paul Verlaine, Sully Prudhomme, Edmond Haraucourt, Maurice Maeterlinck), Anatole France and Lafcadio Hearn. Some of these texts appeared only in magazines, while others were published in the Biblioteca pentru toți and Lectura series. She won prizes from the Romanian Academy (1909, 1921), the Femina Prize (1925) and the national prize for poetry (1937). An accomplished poet of chaste love, delicate confessions and motherhood, Farago is also among the more prominent names in Romanian children's literature. She died in Craiova on 3 January 1954. Her daughter Coca also became a writer.

== Sources ==
- Constantin D. Papastate, Elena Farago. Craiova: Editura Scrisul Românesc, 1975.
