= Ramuri =

Romanian literary magazine

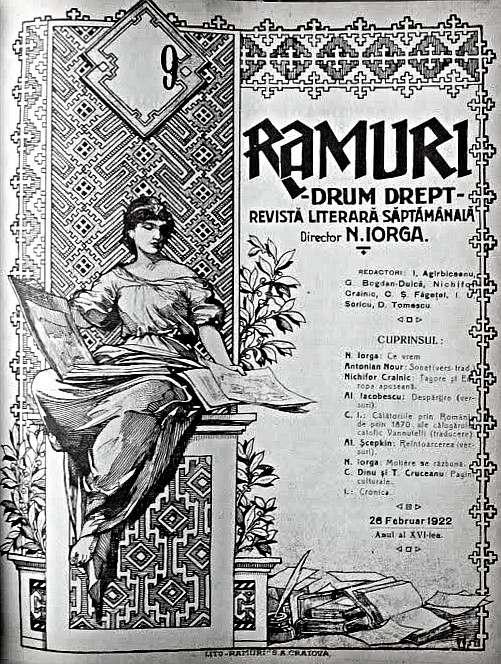
- Cover of a Ramuri and Drum Drept twin issue (Issue 9 for 1922)
- Categories: Literary magazine
- Frequency: 12 issues/year
- Publisher: Ramuri Foundation; Writers' Union of Romania
- First issue: 5 December 1905; 120 years ago
- Country: Romania
- Based in: Craiova
- Language: Romanian
- Website: revistaramuri.ro
- ISSN: 1220-6342
- OCLC: 935478645

Ramuri ("Twigs" or "Branches") is a Romanian literary magazine put out from Craiova, the informal capital of Oltenia region. Its first edition appeared from December 1905, and was closely tied to Nicolae Iorga's Sămănătorul, published in Bucharest; both magazines stood out as voices of traditionalism and Romanian nationalism, reacting against the more cosmopolitan currents in what was then the Kingdom of Romania. At this stage, it was mainly edited by Constantin Șaban Făgețel and D. Tomescu, with support from Iorga, Elena Farago, and various others. At this stage, Ramuri was also noted for its promotion of exceedingly minor Oltenian writers, compensating instead with translation work. Before and during World War I (when it was briefly chased into exile by The Romanian Debacle), it managed to obtain sporadic contributions from some of the leading traditionalists and moderates, and in practice became eclectic. At various intervals, it merged into Iorga's other magazine, Drum Drept, maintaining its traditionalist credentials while the nationalist movement went into crisis. For most of the 1920s, Iorga took over as Ramuri's manager—though his influence there was undermined by contributors from the modernist camp, and in particular by Făgețel's friend Tudor Arghezi.

The magazine's publishing company enjoyed success during the interwar period, though Ramuri itself was always struggling during that interval. The issue contributed to a split between Făgețel, who came to support the National Liberal Party in hopes of obtaining material aid, and Iorga. It continued to appear with interruptions throughout that period and World War II, being discontinued in 1947. When it reemerged in 1964, it was under the Romanian communist regime, which controlled its content. For the first five years, its editor-in-chief was an Oltenian journalist, Ilie Purcaru, who had modernist sympathies. In this new edition, Ramuri discarded traditionalism and presented both Arghezi and modernist sculptor Constantin Brâncuși as its intellectual mentors. Purcaru also proceeded to openly challenge communist censorship; his close associate was Miron Radu Paraschivescu, who opened Ramuri to contributions by the marginalized group of Onirist poets. The magazine became a target for surveillance by the Securitate, especially after hosting a positive review of the far-right theorist Nae Ionescu. Paraschivescu was sidelined, and Purcaru replaced with Alexandru Piru, who mainly used it to publish contributions to literary history and literary theory. Piru also endorsed the July Theses, whereby President Nicolae Ceaușescu announced a curb on cultural liberalization.

After a short interlude in 1976–1978, Ramuri was taken over by poet Marin Sorescu, who changed the editorial line to accommodate modernist literature. Despite Sorescu's own flirtations with, and concessions to, national-communist dogmas, the magazine openly engaged in increasingly bitter debates with established national-communists, such as Eugen Barbu and Corneliu Vadim Tudor; it featured contributions by former political prisoners of the regime, including Ion Dezideriu Sîrbu and Nicolae Steinhardt, but alongside conventional pieces by pro-regime authors, and samples of official propaganda. Sorescu and his associates, including Gabriel Chifu, found themselves supervised and harassed by Securitate agents. Closely reviewed by censors, Ramuri appeared infrequently in the final months before the Romanian Revolution of 1989. It re-emerged in 1990, with Sorescu reconfirmed as editor, publicizing its connections with the Romanian crew at Radio Free Europe. Within a year, Chifu, backed by the Writers' Union of Romania, stripped Sorescu of his managerial duties, arguing that he was incompetent—this sparked an enduring controversy, with Sorescu's supporters arguing that he had been sidelined for refusing to endorse liberal doctrines. Ramuri remained in print after that date, but with interruptions and changes of management.

== 1905–1947 ==
=== First editions ===
The magazine's first period was tied to the cultural life of what was back then the Kingdom of Romania. Ramuri was closely preceded by N. Popescu-Gorgota's Noua Revistă Olteană, also appearing at Craiova, which had many of the same contributors and is described by scholar Florea Firan as a predecessor; it also emerged as a regional satellite of the more influential Sămănătorul—itself put out from Bucharest by Nicolae Iorga. Constantin Șaban Făgețel and D. Tomescu, both of whom were still in high school, later described themselves the regional magazine's "only two" founders, though Nicolae Bănescu is generally mentioned as their partner. As cultural sociologist Z. Ornea remarks, Ramuri was planned as a separate venture in mid-1905, while Sămănătorul and its traditionalist ideology were experiencing their "zenith". However, by the time it was actually ready for print, Iorga's doctrines were being "overshadowed"; Ramuri therefore "had the misfortune of long-surviving the current that had overseen its birth". It appeared from 5 December 1905 until May 1947, with interruptions, changes in publication location and frequency. At first, it was monthly, then in 1908–1910 a bimonthly, appearing weekly in October 1910–May 1911, and again bimonthly in 1912–1914 (in 1913, it was subtitled "Illustrated literary magazine").

As reported by Tribuna newspaper in October 1908, Făgețel had not set up an editorial address, and those in charge of the magazine met for business in one of the members' homes, usually the most spacious and better heated one. Ramuri was led over the years by a committee, the composition of which appeared in a square on the front cover until 1923. In its first stage, the committee was composed of Bănescu, Făgețel, D. N. Ciotori, Nicolae Vulovici, Ștefan Braborescu, and Gheorghe Ionescu-Sisești. Other editors included Elena Farago, Emil Gârleanu, I. M. Marinescu, C. D. Fortunescu, and later Constantin S. Nicolăescu-Plopșor. From its early years, the magazine adopted a mix of traditionalism, agrarianism, and nationalism, as promoted by Sămănătorul; the staff of the two publications, together called a Sămănătorist current, were close. "Credințele și gândul nostru" ("Our Beliefs and Thought"), the magazine's manifesto (signed by Tomescu), eulogized the literary course charted by Iorga, considered a veritable "emperor of thought", while Sămănătorul represented "the most proper and healthy direction" in Romanian literary life.

As observed by literary historian Victor Durnea, Tomescu's text was not completely obsequious: while it upheld traditionalist literature, especially that produced by Romanians isolated in Transylvania and other parts of Austria-Hungary, as the model for nationalist struggle, it noted that authors still needed to be vetted in terms of literary worth. Overall, Ramuri considered itself "a timid green shoot, sprouted from the vigorous trunk of a literary current that had conquered the entire Romanian soul", as Făgețel wrote. At this early stage, Ramuri cultivated a cordial rapport with other magazines put out by Iorga's disciples—in January 1906, it gave extremely positive coverage to A. C. Cuza's aesthetic guidelines, as published by Făt Frumos of Bârlad. Soon after its inception, the magazine identified itself with the Sămănătorist struggles in the social and political sphere. During the peasants' revolt of early 1907, members of its circle, including Ionescu-Sisești, were arrested and threatened with prosecution, and were praised by Iorga himself as his fellow martyrs; Bănescu was reportedly "chased about with revolvers".

As noted by Ornea, Sămănătorism required not just a rejection of art for art's sake, but also a near-complete denial of aesthetics. With an article he published in mid-1907, Tomescu elaborated on this, arguing that only didactic art in support of nationalism and the "social aspect" of literature had any reason for being cultivated in Romania. By February 1909, it was attacking Convorbiri Literare, which, as a cultural mouthpiece for the Conservative Party, had cultivated elitism. This elicited an answer from Convorbiri's Simion Mehedinți, who informed his public that he did not intend to encourage any "sickly" polemics. Other articles setting forth Ramuri's vision include "Rostul și atitudinea noastră" ("Our Purpose and Attitude"; 1908, Tomescu) and "După șase ani de luptă. Literatura în 1911" ("After Six Years of Struggle. Literature in 1911”; 1911, Făgețel). With these, Ramuri mounted an attack against Alexandru Macedonski and his disciples in the Romanian Symbolist movement, described by Tomescu as cosmopolitans with the "blurry eyes of sickly souls". This notion was also carried in a poem by "Chesefe and Nevepe", which borrowed the characteristic prosody of Symbolist Ion Minulescu to poke fun at the Macedonskians:

Iată-l pe maestrul Macedonschy
Cu ceata lui de nespălați,
Lugubru azi cum se ridică
Din lumile celor uitați.
—Sărmane Trubadur — fosilă,
Cum moare glasu-ți de sybilă!

Translation:

Gaze thou upon their Macedonski maven
As he lifts up the pack of the unwashed,
Lugubrious, yet seeking one's poetic haven,
Just when you'd think that they had all been quashed.
—O Minstrel — o my poor, poor corpse,
Your Sibyl's voice has squandered all its force!

=== Farago's eclecticism ===
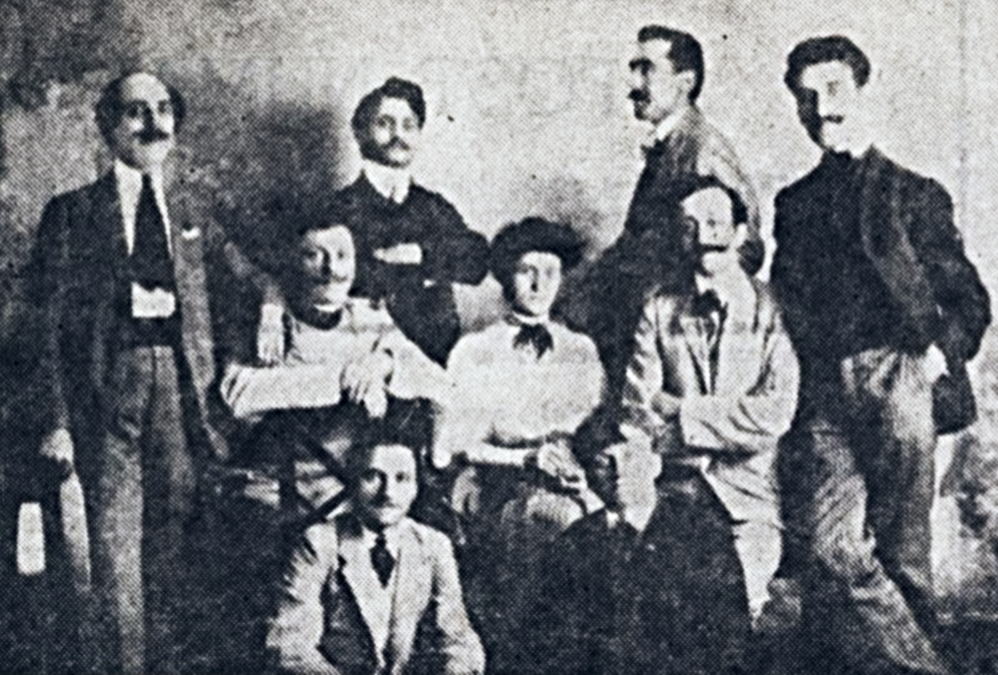
Writers of the Ramuri group in Craiova, around 1908. Left to right: (back row) I. C. Popescu-Polyclet, Anastasie Mândru, Corneliu Moldovanu, D. Tomescu, (middle row) Nicolae Vulovici, Marilena and Emil Gârleanu, (front row) D. Petrescu, I. Dragoslav

According to philologist Gabriel Coșoveanu, Ramuri also had a regionalist ethos, as an "emblem of the Oltenian spirit". In practice, it was eclectic, and tolerated dialogue with other branches of regional culture. In 1908, Farago used Ramuri's publishing house to issue a collection of her own poetry, which consisted largely of "free interpretations" from French Symbolists such as Paul Verlaine. Poet and schoolteacher Mihail Cruceanu, who identified as both a Marxist and a Symbolist, notes that, by 1915, she was the central figure in Craiova's cultural life, with a salon that grouped himself, "nationalists such as those from Ramuri", and a mainline Conservative, Vasile Sandulian. Meanwhile, Făgețel was reportedly resisting offers made by the Conservative-Democratic Party, which was offering to pay him for running its rival newspaper.

Poetry held an important place in Ramuri; contributors included Octavian Goga ("Revedere", "A fost odată"), George Topîrceanu, Ștefan Octavian Iosif, Nicolae Davidescu, Farago, Vulovici, Al. Iacobescu, Al. C. Calotescu-Neicu, Ștefan Bălcești, I. C. Popescu-Polyclet, Victor Eftimiu, Ecaterina Pitiș, George Tutoveanu, I. M. Marinescu, Maria Nicolau, and Dem. Bassarabescu. The future novelist Dem. Theodorescu published some of his works, done in verse, in the Ramuri edition of 1907. The magazine similarly discovered schoolteacher Ada Umbră, whose poetry it featured in a 1908 issue. In 1909, it hosted the debuting poet Felix Aderca, who was at the time a Sămănătorist, but would later serve as a leading figure in modernist rebellion.

Prose contributions were supplied by Ioan Slavici ("Amurg de viață", "Fragmente din jurnalul intim în formă epistolară"), Dimitrie Anghel ("Pelerinul pasionat", "Povestea celor necăjiți", "Tinereță"), Mihail Sadoveanu ("Biserica Jitarului"), and Liviu Rebreanu ("Ordonanța domnului colonel", "Mărturisire"). Ion Agârbiceanu was present almost from the beginning, with a large number of sketches and short stories ("Adormirea lui Moș Ioniță", "Râvna părintelui Man", "Lumea bătrânilor", "Legământul diavolului", "Baba Ilina se pregătește de drum", "Se-mpacă doi dușmani", "Pocăința neamului"). Other prose writers, with Sămănătorist affinities, included Gârleanu ("Călătorie", "O lacrimă pe o geană"), Ioan Alexandru Brătescu-Voinești ("Părtașul"), Caton Theodorian ("De închiriat", "În paraclisul iubirii"), Alexandru Lascarov-Moldovanu ("O vizită"), Ion Ciocârlan, Eugen Boureanul, Petre Partenie, Tiberiu Crudu, and Ion Dragu. Through Gârleanu, the magazine obtained contributions from Olga Bălcescu-Gigurtu, a niece of the historian Nicolae Bălcescu, who debuted in Ramuri with distinctly feminine prose.

Referring to the 1900s and 1910s, Ornea sees Ramuri as promoting "obsolete" local writings, "most often rated below the most basic level of one's exigence". He is critical in particular of the "indescribable" Oltenian contributors, a category that comprises Bănescu, Făgețel and Tomescu, as well as Nicolau, Vulovici, Eugeniu Revent, Lucreția Stergeanu, M. Străjan and Const. S. Stoenescu (but not the more competent Farago). The more viable works, including those by Goga, Sadoveanu, Topîrceanu, I. A. Bassarabescu, Aron Cotruș, I. Dragoslav and George Ranetti, were only obtained with great effort on Făgețel's part. Numerous translations also appeared, sampling works by Johann Wolfgang von Goethe, Friedrich Schiller, Dante Alighieri, Giovanni Boccaccio, Giacomo Leopardi, Rabindranath Tagore, Alexander Pushkin, Mikhail Lermontov, Ivan Krylov, Henryk Sienkiewicz, Anton Chekhov, Rainer Maria Rilke, Paul Valéry, and the verses of Charles Baudelaire, rendered by Ion Pillat and Al. T. Stamatiad. Meanwhile, Farago translated Émile Verhaeren, while D. Nanu, Leconte de Lisle. Other translators included Iacobescu, I. M. Marinescu, Iorga, and M. D. Ioanid. Travel literature was contributed by Iorga, Ionescu-Șișești (notes from Germany), Virgil Tempeanu ("Note de drum"), and C. D. Ionescu ("Prin Munții Mehedinților"). The magazine included a literary and an arts column, sections of poetry, prose, translations, commentaries ("Notes"), folklore, articles on aesthetics, art theory, philosophy, psychology, morals, history, geography, ethnography, as well as letters, memories, commemorations and obituaries. Among the artists who illustrated the pages were Francisc Șirato, Mircea Olarian, Costin Oper, Nadia Bulighin, I. Nițescu, Sever Burada, O. Rădulescu, and G. Billek.

Ramuri created its own publishing house and printing office informally in 1911, when it put out works by Mihail Sorbul, and more formally in 1915. The magazine itself reappeared as a literary weekly in 1915–1916; for most of that interval (24 January 1915 to 15 July 1917), it was merged with Iorga's Drum Drept. During this stage of its existence, it became mocked by the post-Symbolist poet and journalist Ion Vinea, who took Ramuri and Sămănătorul as icons of incompetence. As Vinea put it, his and Aderca's new poetry could not by understood by such critics, since "they're so uncultured that they think the end of a line is where they're supposed to breathe out." This period saw Romania entry into World War I. Ramuri lost two members of its staff during the subsequent campaigns of September 1916: Vulovici died in the Battle of Transylvania, and administrative director Tiberiu Constantinescu was killed at Turtucaia. The magazine was printed at Bucharest throughout that year, at Iași in 1917 (during The Romanian Debacle), and not published at all in 1918. Făgețel returned to Craiova following the war's final stages, when he focused on publishing a nationalist newspaper, Ardealul—entirely focused to covering the ongoing union of Transylvania with Romania.

=== Iorga's tenure ===
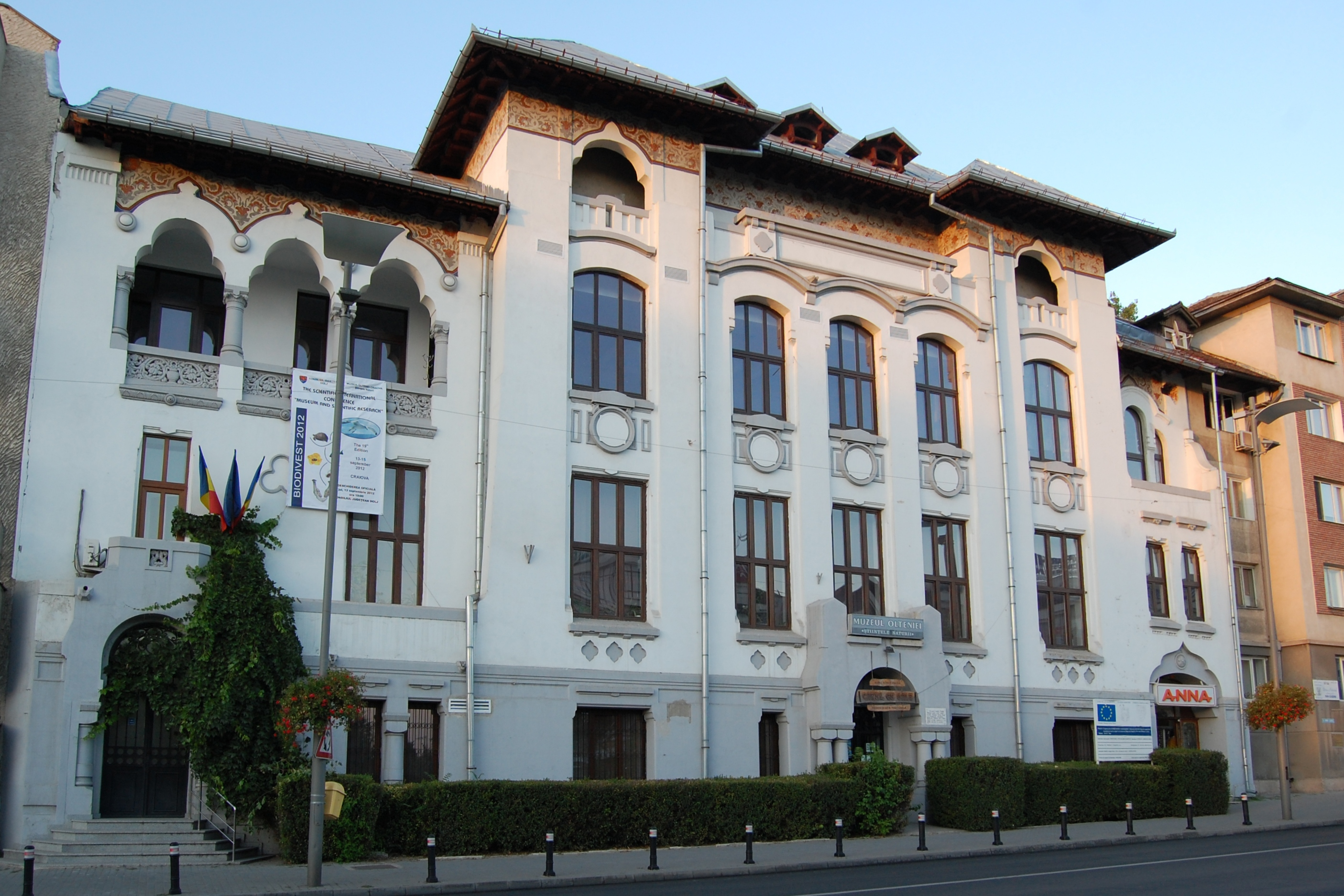
Ramuri Palace, photographed in 2012

When it reemerged at Craiova in 1919, Ramuri continued to draw contributions from Farago, but also had new affiliates, such as poets Eugen Constant, Nicolae Milcu, and Marcel Romanescu. Iorga himself was directly involved with the magazine's publication in the 1920s, after the establishment of Greater Romania—and Ramuri was again a bimonthly in 1919–1921. In January 1921, Iorga informed his Oltenian readers that "Ramuri magazine has again been entrusted to me"; in parallel, Făgețel was busy handling a Ramuri printing press and editorial office. By December, the magazine was struggling to recover contributors who had since rallied around magazines such as Eugen Lovinescu's Sburătorul. According to Nanu, Făgețel was the public face of this effort to "revive Sămănătorul", but Iorga directed him discreetly. Nanu was pleasantly surprised that, after having published in Sburătorul an article which openly questioned Iorga's politics, his own poetry was still welcomed at Ramuri. Reaching out across ideological divides, Făgețel also cultivated the post-Symbolist poet Tudor Arghezi. In September 1921, Arghezi asked his support toward liberating an Oltenian member of the Socialist Party, who had been arrested during a workers' strike.

In 1921, the publication opened its own "Ramuri Palace" in Craiova, in a building designed largely by architect Constantin Iotzu (with additional decorative work by Iorga and Francisc Trybalski). The first issue for 1922 credited Iorga as director, again mentioning that the magazine had merged with Drum Drept into a weekly publication. In that format, the editorial board included Agârbiceanu, Făgețel, Iacobescu, Tomescu, Gheorghe Bogdan-Duică, Nichifor Crainic, and I. U. Soricu. In this twinned incarnation, the review hosted Iorga's essay against the emergence of a Romanian decadent movement, including his translation of "healthy" Western European poetry (Iorga encouraged Romanian authors to model themselves on the latter category). Sburătorul derided this effort, and especially its assumption that modernism in other countries was based on nationalism and "ethno-psychological normality". According to this source, Iorga and his disciples had not ceased promoting "sectarian reactionarism" and artistic "mediocrity". Iorga's text was instead welcomed by Tiberiu Crudu in Revista Moldovei, who also commended Iorga's renditions from French, English, Italian and German poetry. Various editorial constraints meant that these samples, though rhyming in the Romanian version, generally appeared in blank verse; exceptions included a fragment from John Masefield, seen by Crudu as outstandingly translated. The same reviewer noted a major decline in the output of literary prose, with Agârbiceanu as the only genuine writer still featured in that issue. In later years, this sector was represented by debuting authors, such as Cezar Petrescu ("Învierea căpitanului Lazăr", "Omul din vis"), Gib Mihăescu ("Scuarul"), and Victor Papilian ("P. N. V.", "Popa ăl bătrân").

Shortly after, Ramuri had regained its independence; Iorga served as its director continuously from 1923 to 1927, with Drum Drept still used as a subtitle throughout those years (to April 1927). Folklore played an important part in this edition; its collectors included Constantin Rădulescu-Codin, D. Lungulescu and Traian Păunescu-Ulmu. Scholarly studies on the subject were signed by Alexandru Dima, Scarlat Struțeanu, Ovidiu Papadima, Dumitru Caracostea, and Al. Popescu-Telega. In 1925, Iorga allowed Nicolăescu-Plopșor to publish in Ramuri one of the folktales he had collected from Oltenia, but publicly indicated his displeasure that the text was relying heavily on the Oltenian dialect. Iorga suggested that this focus had destroyed the narrative, and that Nicolăescu-Plopșor did not display a "loving hand" in transcribing the source material.

Literary commentary was offered by Iorga, Bogdan-Duică, Caracostea, Tudor Vianu, Tomescu, Făgețel, Dima, and Păunescu-Ulmu. Most articles in this area promoted traditionalist literature; modernist literature was often met with visible reservations (Petre Drăgescu, "Extremismul literar"; Păunescu-Ulmu, "Tradiție și literatură"). In August 1923, Ramuri hosted Iorga's entire conference against Expressionism, which he regarded as a Germanization of Romanian culture (by 1924, the issue was expanded upon in several Ramuri articles, with Iorga detailing his accusations against modernists such as Aderca). This stance nominally placed Ramuri in conflict with Crainic's own magazine, Gândirea, which had welcomed Expressionism as compatible with the Sămănătorist legacy. As noted by art historian Dan Grigorescu, Iorga steered clear of polemics with Crainic. He "distinguished between Crainic's own poetry (which he treasured) and Expressionist poetry." Iorga's effort was backed by Ion Sân-Giorgiu, who in his 1923 articles for Ramuri was describing the Expressionists (whose ranks he would later join) as "obsessed" with metaphors. In 1926, N. I. Herescu, who had been a contributor to Ramuri before setting up the rival regionalist publication, Năzuința Românească, argued in Gândirea that Făgețel and Tomescu's enterprise was dying. After most professional writers have "escaped from under Iorga", the remaining contributors were of an inferior quality: "[they] will drink, eat, breathe just like you and me, but when it comes to writing poetry, they do so with their feet".

Iorga was particularly active. His 90 articles, published over 43 issues, touched on numerous questions of literary history and aspects of daily life in the past. He signed an article about the towns of Oltenia during the modernization phase of 1760–1830, with similar interests being expressed by Bănescu, Furtună, Lazăr Toma, Fortunescu, Sextil Pușcariu, Ioan Lupaș, M. Strajaru, and Constantin Cehan-Racoviță. Through Iorga, Ramuri also lambasted the internationally famous novelist Panait Istrati, describing his novels as a continuation of Romania's own lowbrow literature, the penny dreadful. The magazine engaged in polemics with Lovinescu, Mihail Dragomirescu, Ovid Densusianu and certain modernist factions (for instance: "Intelectualizarea", "Impertinență sau aiurea", by Tomescu), on the subject of promoting national characteristics in literature. Vianu wrote "Universul moral al lui Macedonski" and "Gustul literar", Struțeanu surveyed the work of Mihai Eminescu, Petre Partenie commented on Vasile Alecsandri. Among the poets who were featured by Ramuri after 1920 were Arghezi ("Oraș medieval"), Lucian Blaga ("Lume"), Ion Pillat ("Elegie", "Recuerdo", "Cules"), Vasile Voiculescu ("Avariție", "Înaintea aurorei", "Apocalips"), and Zaharia Stancu. In 1928, Ramuri also hosted debut poems by an Arghezian disciple, Ilariu Dobridor. The theater was represented by Eftimiu (Rapsozii), Iorga (Tudor Vladimirescu, Sarmală, amicul poporului), and G. M. Vlădescu (Omul care nu mai vine). Blaga was also featured in this category, with a fragment of Zamolxe, which is often seen as a sample of Expressionist drama.

Contributors were also interested in documents and archives, unearthing important new information about writers such as Grigore Alexandrescu, Bogdan Petriceicu Hasdeu, Iosif Vulcan, Costache Caragiale, Ioan Maiorescu, and Traian Demetrescu. The magazine also included a review of magazines, as well as notes and commentaries on morals, religion, psychology, education, history, geography and ethnology, bringing an essential contribution to shaping the cultural landscape of its day. Other authors included Emanoil Bucuța, Zaharia Bârsan, Nicolae Constantin Batzaria, Nicolae M. Condiescu, Ion Dongorozi, Anastasie Mândru, Mihai Moșandrei, Gavril Rotică, George Vâlsan, George Voevidca, I. Pavelescu, G. D. Pencioiu, Soricu, and Liviu Marian. Early on, the eponymous publishing house worked on reissuing various of Iorga's early works as a poet, translator, historian and culture critic. He gave them approval, but later stated his disappointment, noting that Ramuri had taken "disagreeable" editorial decisions, such as putting out Istoria românilor în chipuri și icoane as a single, virtually unreadable, volume. Iorga was also disappointed by the graphic quality of his Roumanie Pittoresque (1925), and by Făgețel's incompetence in promoting his monograph on the Balkans. In mid-1929, Făgețel declared his frustration that Iorga's account of life during World War I had only sold 2,500 copies, and that Ramuri's best-selling author was Dongorozi (who sold more copies than Cezar Petrescu).

=== 1930s trends ===
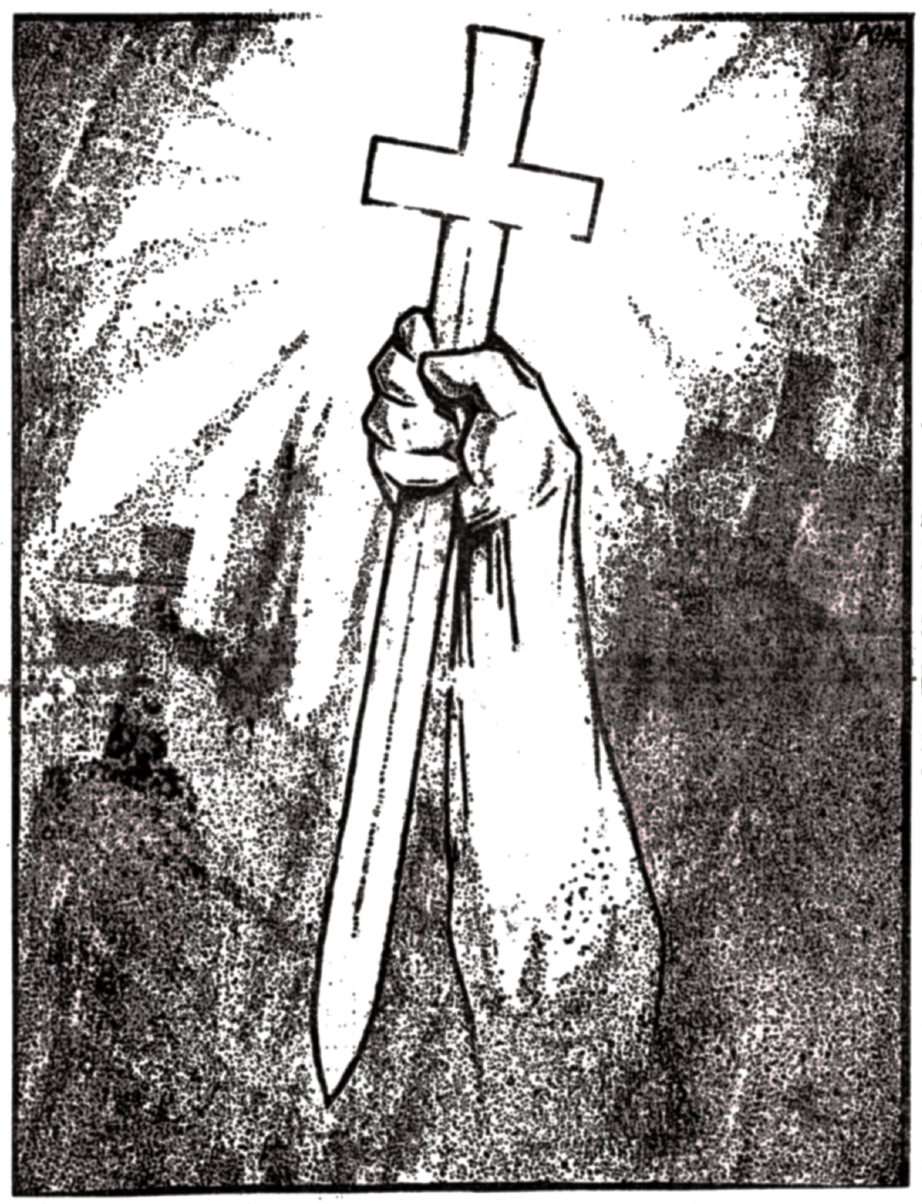
Allegory of Nichifor Crainic's Christian militancy (January 1933 drawing by Victor Ion Popa)

In a 1927 article for Sburătorul, which spoke of Sămănătorism as being soundly defeated, Aderca also noted that Făgețel was no longer interested in editorial work, and was mainly a printer, as well as a perennial candidate for the office of Craiova Mayor. This account is partly supported by Iorga. According to him, Făgețel had run the Ramuri enterprise into debt, and as a result had tried to win favors from the political establishment, joining the National Liberal Party. Aderca also noted that the defense of aesthetic traditionalism fell exclusively on Tomescu, whose long topical essay was hosted by Ramuri. To the rise of modernist culture, Tomescu was opposing the poetry of apparent neo-Sămănătorists, including Voiculescu and Radu Gyr. With Iorga no longer in charge, in mid-1929 Arghezi published in Ramuri a tribute to Aderca himself, described therein as one of the most accomplished aesthetes in modern Romania. As remarked by journalist A. P. Samson, Ramuri had "discarded N. Iorga's directional flashes in favor of being nudged into potholes by Tudor Arghezi, who is strong as a poet, but a scatographer in his prose".

At a literary meeting staged by Ramuri in 1929, Arghezi proceeded to explore his own roots (described by Tomescu as planted in "Oltenia's vigorous soil"), and gave some of his first impressions regarding the region's natural beauty. Arghezi took his polemic with Iorga further. Also in 1929, he published in Ramuri the piece "Dobitoacele noastre literare", wherein he argued that traditionalist literature had treated peasants as "dumb animals", incapable of adapting themselves to the benefits of civilization. Still an occasional contributor to Ramuri, Tomescu published articles which (as Durnea notes) effectively conceded that Sămănătorism had died. Epigrammatist Ion Popescu-Polyctet was also at Ramuri in 1929, producing an anthology of Oltenian verse. Făgețel's magazine put out a bibliophile edition, also in 1929. "As large as an encyclopedia", it took a gold medal for design at the Barcelona International Exposition, but was no longer in print in 1930–1933. Craiova's Ramuri hall was by then a venue for public debates, airing a large array of grievances and projects. Around 1930, Cruceanu, who had joined the clandestine Romanian Communist Party, appeared there to lecture on monopolies and cartels. This topic allowed him to flaunt conventions by citing Vladimir Lenin's Imperialism, the Highest Stage of Capitalism as a scientific reference. On 7 August 1933, Grigore Filipescu, who favored economic liberalism as a means of tackling the Great Depression, was scheduled to speak at Ramuri; his intervention was prevented by advocates of debt relief.

Through Tomescu, Ramuri documented the rift occurring in 1935 between Iorga and Crainic, as the latter chose to embrace the Christian right—his defense of the Romanian Orthodox Church as a source of Romanian identity having never been explicit in Sămănătorism. Tomescu voiced his support for Sămănătorist ideology, especially against Crainic's admiration of fascism; he argued that Iorga had already stated "all the elements of the nationalist doctrine", accusing Crainic, who quoted from Nikolai Berdyaev, of being an undisclosed Slavophile. Ramuri had entered a steep decline even after the 1933 revival—as reported in June 1935 by the cultural journalist Mihail Sebastian. Offering his musings on the "decomposition of our provincial cities", Sebastian noted: "The magazine Ramuri, good or bad as it may have been, no longer appears, or, if does still appear, is no longer visible." The same was reported by the nationalist daily Porunca Vremii, whose reviewers noted that they had not seen any issue of Ramuri ever since the festive edition of 1929.

In 1937, Dumitru Mercaș reviewed another issue (with articles by Dima, Struțeanu, and Păunescu-Ulmu) for the provincial magazine Însemnări Ieșene, commending those involved for their "great effort" of keeping Ramuri afloat. Porunca Vremii welcomed the relaunch, in particular for nationalist content put out by Păunescu-Ulmu and Făgețel, but also for a scientific essay by Dragomirescu, but disliked the inclusion of Ion Biberi, who was an ideological nonconformist. I. D. Ioan of Convorbiri Literare was less welcoming, suggesting that the writing team at Ramuri approached exciting topics without rising to the occasion. For instance Păunescu-Ulmu wrote polemically against the young generation, but "[the youths'] higher and more fecund sense of purpose eludes [his] sclerosed neurons." Noting that Ramuri had begun publishing a political column, Ioan advised it to renounce covering literature altogether (though he also mentioned the presence of a "vigorous young talent", Val Mugur).

As a publishing venture, Ramuri was active throughout the 1930s, with Alexandru Busuioceanu launching his Apollo Collection, comprising livres d'art mostly dedicated to the classics of Romanian painting and sculpture. In a 1931 piece, former Ramuri editor Crainic commended Busuioceanu's effort, while noting that the enterprise could not supply "the precision and graphic panache that such a collection would require." From 1936, Făgețel curated an "Oltenian Writers' Collection", which issued works by (among others) Calotescu-Neicu, Dima, and Biberi. In 1938, the publishing venture also featured the first-ever monograph on the Oltenian modernist sculptor, Constantin Brâncuși, as authored by Vasile Georgescu Paleolog. The Ramuri imprint also issued notable works of political literature, including Alexandru Sahia's account of his trips in the Soviet Union (which doubled as a defense of Soviet policies) and the first Romanian textbook of geopolitics, which had three authors (including Anton Golopenția).

=== Fascist period and World War II ===
Romanian government leaders Ion Antonescu and Mihai Antonescu with Constantin S. Nicolăescu-Plopșor and other Craiova intellectuals, at "Oltenia Week" of October 1943

The late interwar saw the radicalization of some nationalists, who converted to fascism, while others embraced political moderation; this also divided the Ramuri staff and its affiliate poets. An associate of Oltenia's left-wing groups, sociologist Petre Pandrea recalled that Făgețel was an early sympathizer of the far-right movements. In the late 1930s, after a period of supporting left-wing causes, Eugen Constant frequented the Iron Guard—even as Iorga himself was emerging as one of the Guard's critics on the right. The extremes of nationalism were also probed by Crainic, who had moved on to publish the independent newspaper Calendarul, which ended up being taken over by the Guardists. Nicolăescu-Plopșor was an organizer of the dissident National Liberal Party-Brătianu, and was involved in street battles during the general election of December 1933. By May 1940, he had joined the catch-all National Renaissance Front (FRN), formed around the authoritarian King Carol II, and was active within its Oltenian sections. The regime also attracted Făgețel, who entered the FRN in January 1939. He and Tomescu were then co-opted by the group's Social Service in Ținutul Olt.

The magazine itself continued to appear into the early years of World War II, and in 1940 curated another bibliophile edition, called Oltenia—with contributions by Arghezi, Fortunescu, Papilian, Romanescu, and Constantin Rădulescu-Motru. It also ran its own library, managed by Ștefan Bossun in 1940–1948. In 1941, the country was governed by Ion Antonescu, who increased authoritarian pressures, aligned Romania with Nazi Germany, and committed Romania in the war against the Soviet Union. Ramuri published a six-months issue, covering the second half of 1941. According to the chroniclers at Viața Basarabiei, it displayed the state of its editorial committee as an "honest" but "exhausted" group of intellectuals: Vianu was present with an essay, and Ion Minulescu with "banal" Symbolist poems; Păunescu-Ulmu mounted an attack on George Călinescu's "infamous" work of literary history, and contributed his own "speculations" in folkloristics. Purely literary, "remarkable" prose was contributed by Nicolae al Lupului, while poems from the front (in Nazified Ukraine) were penned by Ion Mara. As Antonescu expanded the corpus of antisemitic laws, Ramuri joined in the celebration, publishing memoirs by Constantin Gongopol. These gave negative accounts of his erstwhile collaboration with Jewish journalists, accusing them of having controlled the interwar press.

Some of the content remained focused on Oltenian regionalism, as with Ion Donat's essay about "Oltenia's place in Romanian history", taken up by Ramuri in December 1942. In late 1943, Ramuri celebrated "Oltenia Week", which was largely a Tomescu initiative. Also then, the magazine hosted a series of literary meetings, attended by Bălcești, Farago, Iacobescu, Minulescu and Nicolăescu-Plopșor, as well as by Virgil Carianopol, Mircea Damian, George Gregorian, and chanteuse Maria Tănase. The event was given a lukewarm review by Pandrea. An animator at the new magazine Meridian, which was vocal in its opposition to Ramuri, he saw Făgețel and Tomescu as unable to shake off their "elegiac and retrograde" Sămănătorism. According to Pandrea, the latter current was of Western Moldavian source, and as such had always been ill-suited to the Oltenian psyche. He recommended instead an Oltenian modernism—connected with the rawest folklore, and bridging Arghezi's literary expression with Brâncuși's visual simplification. With the first, double, issue for 1944, Ramuri expanded on its traditionalist agenda, carrying an essay by Petre Drăgoiescu, explicitly set out against all forms of "literary extremism", as well as a prose work by Marta Pavelin and conventional poetry—works that another contemporary reviewer, Ovidiu Rîureanu, described as entirely outdated.

Some members of the Ramuri circle were more tolerant of modernism, and also fought for political diversity. At the height of Antonescu's dictatorship, Făgețel was presiding upon an Oltenian Writers' Association, which also recruited Arghezi. When the latter came into conflict with the regime, and was deported inside the region (at Târgu Jiu internment camp), Făgețel continued to speak out in his favor. As a publishing venture, Ramuri issued Liviu Bratoloveanu's versified diary, Eu și Dunărea. As explained by Bratoloveanu some thirty years later, the book was "toned down" in comparison to his earlier and later communist-inspired works, since the "full-on fascist regime" had made it impossible for leftists to communicate freely. Antonescu's ouster in August 1944 restored democracy, but also inaugurated a flare-up of violence and times of scarcity. Tomescu's final manuscript, outlining his lifelong aesthetic vision, was mishandled and partly lost during the events, after only the introductory parts had been published in Ramuri.

Ramuri's depreciation was still ongoing after the coup, despite it being placed under the patronage of the Michael I Royal Foundation. Before the full closure, only one issue saw print for all of 1945, and none appeared in 1946. With the onset of Soviet occupation and the rise of the Communist Party, Făgețel was increasingly seen as a reactionary. The communist organ Scînteia welcomed Ramuri's reemergence in January 1947, but immediately noted its disappointment that the magazine was still in its "ivory tower". It expressed distaste that the writers featured included those who had been associated with Crainic and Gândirea, listing Dima, Papilian, Păunescu-Ulmu, and Voiculescu. Among Făgețel's friends, Arghezi also noted that the magazine had become too "thick" in content, suggesting that Ramuri we redesigned as a 16-page weekly. The final issue, appearing in May of that year, was mocked by another communist newspaper, România Liberă, as "offering asylum to a handful of obsolete and confused intellectuals". The contributors were ridiculed in turn, but also listed for their ideological nonconformity: Al. Popescu Teiușan, for an essay which criticized "people's democracies" and rejected the indoctrination of children; Romulus Vulcănescu, for his association with nationalist doctrines; Ion Caraion, for his "inept" poems. Făgețel's death on 5 December 1947, exactly 42 years after Ramuri's first issue, put an end to any hope of seeing the magazine revived. Tomescu had also died by January 1948, when a parastas service was held for him and Făgețel at the Bucharest White Church.

== 1964–1978 ==
=== Relaunch ===
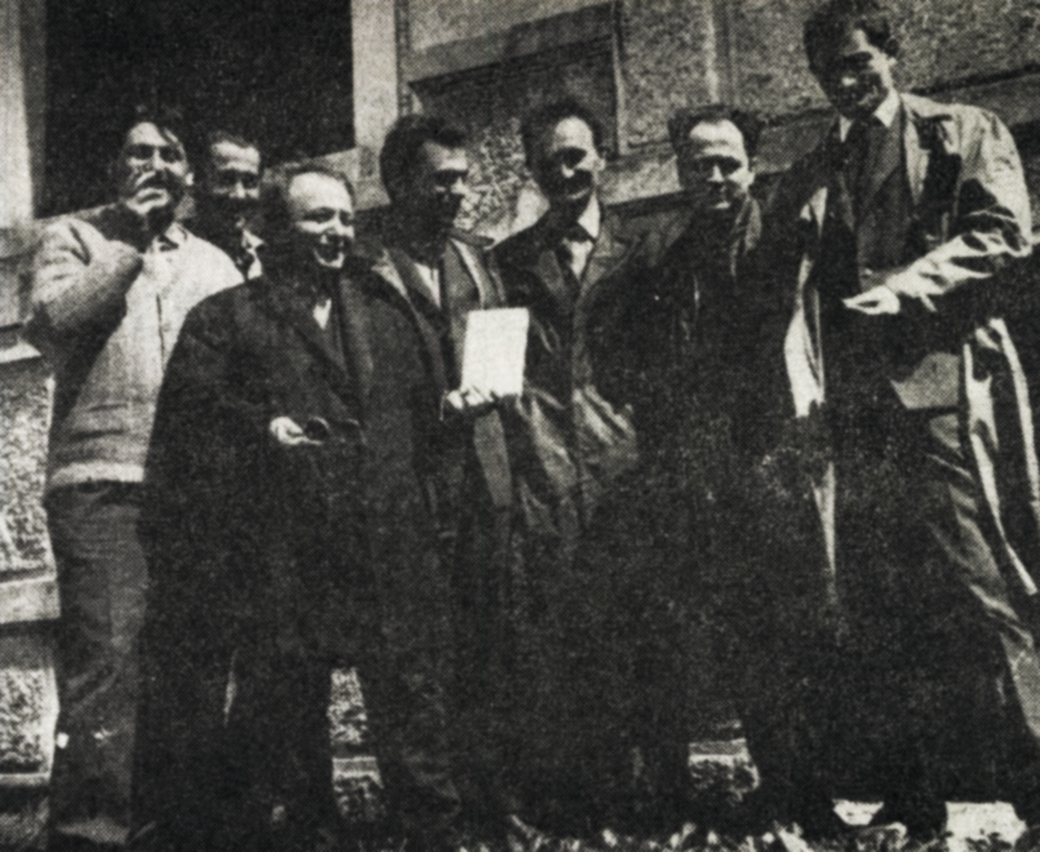
Staff of Ramuri in August 1964. From the right: Paul Anghel, Ion Caraion, Ștefan Bănulescu, Ilie Purcaru, Petre Dragu, Romeo Popescu, Ilarie Hinoveanu

As observed by historian Al. Firescu, Făgețel had been branded a xenophobe after the creation of a Romanian People's Republic, when Socialist Realism was the cultural norm. The magazine was revived as a monthly publication appearing at Craiova from August 1964. That date was selected to coincide with the 20th Liberation from Fascist Occupation Day—marked as a major socialist holiday. The issue opened with an account by Arghezi, describing his feelings about the Oltenian town of Târgu Cărbunești; also included were included lyrics by Marin Sorescu and Nicolae Dragoș. Much of the issue was Brâncuși-themed, with a portrait of him as a symbol of the magazine itself, done by Benedict Gănescu, alongside the summary of a round-table on the life and times of Brâncuși (with participants such as André Frénaud).

Beginning with the second issue, Ramuri had contributions from an old collaborator, Vianu, as well as from Vianu's colleague, Călinescu. The staff chronicler at Luceafărul was more impressed by the third issue, which established Ramuri as "one of the most interesting profiles in our press, both in what it publishes and in its graphic format." Returning with a historical essay on Constantin Brâncoveanu, contributed by Paul Anghel, this issue also had critical takes on new Romanian poetry (one by Alexandru A. Philippide, the other by Carlo Salinari), and an analysis of the standard Romanian literary schoolbook, by George Muntean. Arghezi returned in 1965 with quasi-sociological musings about Oltenia, describing Oltenian migrations to other areas of Romania as not unlike the seasonal migration of swallows, and expressing his verdict that Romanians and Bukovinans formed the best two specimens of the Romanian people.

Ilie Purcaru was this edition's first managerial director, seconded by Gănescu as artistic designer and Dinu Săraru as theater columnist. In 1985, Purcaru and Ilarie Hinoveanu, who was for a while the second editor, reminisced that the magazine was given the go-ahead by a local communist leader, and future President of Romania, Nicolae Ceaușescu. From the first days of 1965, the two men were joined by an editorial board, comprising two of the first-edition contributors, Constant and Nicolăescu-Plopșor, alongside Sina Dănciulescu and Petre Dragu. Their institutional overseer was the Committee for Culture and the Arts in Craiova Region (later Dolj County), accounting for their pledge to uphold "the teachings of Marxism-Leninism"; the editorial offices were in the same building as the local daily, Înainte.

This incarnation considers itself a successor of Făgețel's enterprise, celebrating 1980 as its 75th anniversary, and 2005 as its centennial. In its first year, it received contributions from C. D. Fortunescu, who had collaborated from the first issues of the first edition, and who was aged ninety. This pedigree was highlighted in 1984 by museologist Tiberiu Alexa, who saw Ramuri, Familia, Viața Românească and Convorbiri Literare as the four Romanian cultural magazines to have preserved not just an interwar tradition, but also their city of residence. Self-exiled from Romania, nationalist writer Pamfil Șeicaru discussed the continuity issue in his letters to Crainic—who had survived communist imprisonment and was being tacitly rehabilitated. Șeicaru expressed consternation that Crainic had not been made editor of the revived Ramuri, "so as to provide [it] with adequate content", adding: "What good does it do to borrow the title, if it no longer corresponds with 30 years of [Iorga's traditionalism]?"

=== Onirism and "productive heresies" ===
The new edition's first 25 years of existence coincided with the second half of Romania's communist regime. Hinoveanu states that the magazine was closely following the agenda imposed by Ceaușescu, as Communist General Secretary, during the party's 9th Congress in 1965. These directives allowed for a recovery of interwar cultural themes, generating what Hinoveanu called a "free multilaterally developed culture within a free multilaterally developed society." In 1965–1966, Miron Radu Paraschivescu, a dissident poet engaged with the anti-Stalinist left, was tasked with answering letters to the editor. As one who reviewed aspiring authors, he was eventually allowed in April 1966 to publish Ramuri's literary supplement, Povestea Vorbei ("The Story of the Word"), which he turned from a provincial-level publication into a nationally-famous institution for debuting young writers. A group of Onirist authors, previously indexed by communist censorship, was welcomed by this venue, which became that group's original mouthpiece. As later reported by the Onirist Dumitru Țepeneag, Paraschivescu, having once been engaged with Surrealism, was hoping to construct a "'holy alliance' of the entire avant-garde." As Ramuri's editor-in-chief, Purcaru also tested censorship—by allowing a former political prisoner, Leon Kalustian, to contribute a set of articles on the interwar diplomacy of Nicolae Titulescu.

Around the same time, the magazine featured an "article series" by Țepeneag, wherein he sought to revive interest for writers of the first modernist generations—variously including Caraion, Mateiu Caragiale, Eusebiu Camilar, and Constant Tonegaru. The Caraion piece irritated the censors, and only appeared in a heavily modified version, prompting Țepeneag to suspend his participation. Caraion himself was a regular presence at Ramuri, part of a team of translators that also grew to include Sorescu, Aurora Cornu, Geo Dumitrescu, Ștefan Augustin Doinaș, Mihnea Gheorghiu, Tașcu Gheorghiu, and Teohar Mihadaș. Over the following decades, Ramuri put out numerous authors in translation—variously including Endre Ady, Anna Akhmatova, Ivo Andrić, Alain Bosquet, Robert Desnos, T. S. Eliot, Lawrence Ferlinghetti, Allen Ginsberg, Eugenio Montale, Ovid, Octavio Paz, Plato, Ezra Pound, Robert Sabatier, William Saroyan, Georg Trakl, Giuseppe Ungaretti, Walt Whitman, and Sergei Yesenin.

Paraschivescu only preserved his Povestea Vorbei until December 1966, when censors intervened "for ideological reasons". The event earned attention within the anticommunist Romanian diaspora, who was probing the limits of anti-Soviet liberalization at home. Radio Free Europe's Monica Lovinescu surmised that Paraschivescu had not been sidelined because of his modernist aesthetics, but simply because he and the Onirists were advocating generic independence from the party line. As she put it: "One cannot possibly overstate just how much M. R. Paraschivescu, with his productive heresies, stokes and supports the youths' own courage." Before his ouster, Paraschivescu had granted editorial space to many writers who had been fully banned, and were just then allowed to resume work (examples range from Aurel Ciurunga and Nicolae Crevedia to Iordan Chimet and Gellu Naum). He had personally handled the publication of poems by the Onirists, including Leonid Dimov and Vintilă Ivănceanu, but also the first poems by a post-Onirist generation of poets—Ștefan Agopian and Virgil Mazilescu. Other Paraschivescu discoveries were Norman Manea, whose first experimental short-story was taken by Povestea Vorbei in 1966, and the literary historian Florea Firan, who in 1995 published a Ramuri-themed monograph.

=== From Purcaru to Piru ===
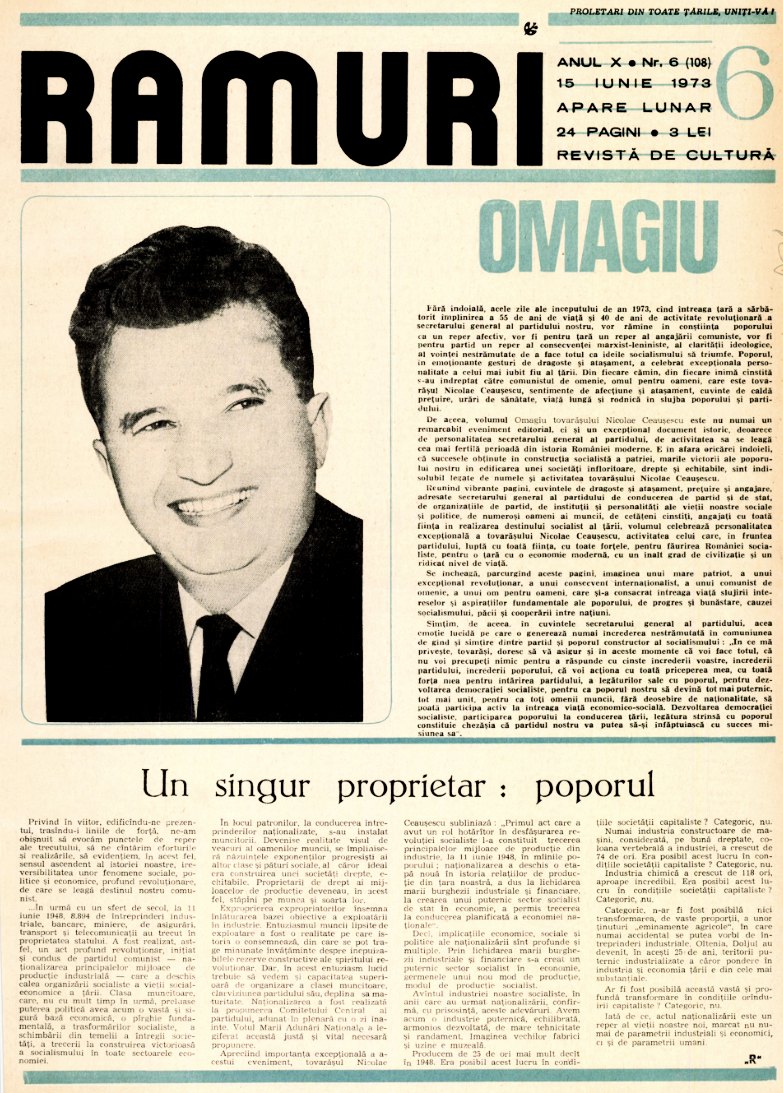
June 1973 cover of Ramuri, with portrait of Nicolae Ceaușescu and an editorial article eulogizing the nationalization of 1948

Purcaru was largely absent from Romania in 1966–1967, when he covered the Vietnam War from North Vietnam; during this interval, Ramuri discovered another new poet, Daniela Crăsnaru. At the beginning of the post-Paraschivescu decade, in February 1967, Ramuri was the center of a cultural circle involving Pandrea, Georgescu Paleolog, and Nicolăescu-Plopșor; their activities focused on recovering contributions by other old-regime figures, including Brâncuși and novelist Gib Mihăescu. Ramuri's enduring interest in reconnecting with old-regime literature was another topic of interest for observers in the diaspora, but also a source of irritation for the regime at home. As early as 1961, Securitate spies heard reports that Paraschivescu was supporting the rehabilitation of Nae Ionescu—officially still reviled as an ideologue of the Iron Guard—, on grounds that Ionescu was primarily a "man of talent". In February 1968, Mircea Eliade, the self-exiled philosopher and culture critic, reported his astonishment that Ramuri had been allowed to host a retrospective on Ionescu, who had been his own intellectual master. Eliade feared that "such 'excesses' might be used by the Stalinists (or whatever they're called) to turn the screws back on them." In April, as leader of the Communist-Party cell in Craiova, Ștefan Voitec both praised and chided Ramuri: the magazine had a "luminous tradition", but had allowed itself to publish promote a "distorted image of [Ionescu], glossing over his reactionary ideas." A case file in the Securitate archive, compiled shortly after, spoke of Ramuri as reviving fascism. This source focused its report on Purcaru's editorial praise of Ionescu, and noted that Ramuri had almost succeeded in publishing articles by surviving former members of the Iron Guard and the National Christian Party.

After Pandrea's own death in July 1968, the magazine put out installments from his posthumous papers, including a fragmentary novel. It also delved deeper in history with its recovery efforts: also in 1968, it became the first publication to host Eminescu's fragmentary translations from Immanuel Kant's Critique of Pure Reason. During Purcaru's tenure, Ramuri launched a debate about the "crisis of [Romanian] prose" and pioneered the reportage genre, with contributions made by Purcaru himself—and also by other writers, including Anghel, Adrian Păunescu, Mihai Pelin, Mihai Caranfil, and Ștefan Tunsoiu. In June 1967, Purcaru had been interviewed by Scînteia Tineretului newspaper regarding his expectations from this type of writings. He commented that the Romanian reportage had been granted a "solemn funeral" by Geo Bogza in 1945, since every other such work published since had been copying "a foreign model, arrived here from some place, the sort of place where there are no opinions, and no actual press, and no actual reportage". The censors picked this out as a reference to Soviet propaganda, and the corresponding fragment was cut out of the interview.

In June 1969, Purcaru was replaced by Alexandru Piru, who took Ilarie Hinoveanu as his adjunct. Together, they refashioned Ramuri into a magazine of literary theory. This trend was noted in July by România Literară magazine, since that month's issue featured a high number of theoretical essays, including Teodor Bugnariu's take on Marxist literary criticism, Adrian Marino's "Critique of literary ideas", and Piru's own musings about literary critics as poets; other portions focused on Oltenian literary history, with Șerban Cioculescu showcasing his discovery of a dramatic poem about Tudor Vladimirescu. Immediately after his arrival, Piru organized his own selective recovery of interwar modernism, focusing in particular on Ion Barbu's brand of Hermeticism. This allowed him to openly mock the rival scholar Ovid Crohmălniceanu, who had previously stood for the disgraced school of Socialist Realism, and to favor interpretative formulas advanced by Basarab Nicolescu; at Ramuri, this implicit attack on Crohmălniceanu was also taken up by two young columnists, Mihai Ungheanu and Ovidiu Ghidirmic, both of whom pivoted toward Ceaușescu's national communism.

Literary criticism remained a leading focus of the magazine throughout the following decades, when Ramuri hosted articles by seniors such as Cioculescu, Crohmălniceanu, Dima, Marino, Ion Biberi, Mihai Novicov and Vladimir Streinu, but also new-generation critics of every background and orientation—Mircea Iorgulescu (who made his debut here), Vartan Arachelian, Dan Culcer, Dinu Flămând, Gheorghe Grigurcu, Nicolae Manolescu, Romul Munteanu, Eugen Negrici, Eugen Simion, Cornel Ungureanu, and Dan Zamfirescu. The journal also hosted Dorin Teodorescu on his 1970 debut; he was subsequently employed as a regular columnist. With less regularity, Ramuri hosted contributions to art, film, theatrical and music criticism, with authors such as Săraru, Petru Comarnescu, Lucian Pintilie, Valentin Silvestru, Ion Dezideriu Sîrbu, and Anatol Vieru.

Piru's tenure coincided with the July Theses, whereby Ceaușescu reissued social commands in the field of culture—and, as such, selectively introduced neo-Stalinism into the national-communist doctrine. According to Lovinescu, Piru originally resisted the trend, criticizing Nicolae Breban and Alexandru Ivasiuc for supporting "socialized literature", but by May 1972 reappeared in public with a "firebrand defense of censorship". Throughout those years, the editorial work at Ramuri was handled by Piru, Marino, Grigore Traian Pop, and Niculae Gheran. The latter published memoirs of the period, noting that much of their time, officially described as participation in literary colloquiums, was spent on erotic pursuits (with aspiring women poets from the provincial towns of Oltenia) and drunken escapades. According to Gheran, Piru was well liked by his students at the University of Craiova: when Înainte hosted an article sharply critical of his tenure, they rebelled and nearly stormed into the editorial offices, with Piru himself intervening to stop them; however, his own move to Oltenia was a haphazard decision, or a "tribute to an autumnal fling of his." In April 1976, Piru was replaced with an editorial board, including Romulus Diaconescu and Pelin as the executive directors. Under their watch, Ramuri was mostly focused on Oltenia, and became compatible with the generic lines of communist propaganda.

== 1978–1992 ==
=== Sorescu's arrival ===
Sorescu's promotion to manager of Ramuri, made official on 15 July 1978, brought in a number of changes, and earned him the respect of other cultural figures. According to a September note by poet Nicolae Prelipceanu, his arrival was a qualitative boost for Ramuri—introducing the public to new talents, such as Dorin Tudoran and Ion Cocora. During Sorescu's period as editor, with Diaconescu kept on as the second editor, Ramuri was primarily a poetry magazine, and had a mild regionalist focus. The publishing venue had also employed Sîrbu, who was a known dissident and a former political prisoner. Reportedly, the Transylvanian Sîrbu, who deeply resented Craiova as his place of exile in the Balkans, also had an ongoing rivalry with Firan; he only enjoyed the company of G. T. Pop (who was himself of Transylvanian origin). Sîrbu's exact relationship with Sorescu is the topic of dispute: some witnesses argue that they were friends, though Sîrbu denied this in his diaries. Also according to Sîrbu: "When I come up to visit Ramuri's offices (which I only do at solstice), they all stop talking and turn pale: they all act as if one of them—who exactly, I couldn't tell you—has just been castrated on the spot, without anesthesia, but they're not to talk about it." Overall, Sîrbu's presence made the magazine a target of constant surveillance by the Securitate, who relied on a growing network of Craiova informants. Building on documents provided by historian Clara Mareș in 2012, literary critic Dan C. Mihăilescu opined that the network must have included Sorescu himself, who "managed to both inform on Sîrbu and protect him, being, as it turns out, himself the target of surveillance"; according to Mihăilescu, collaboration with the Securitate had by then become virtually obligatory for people involved in editorial work.

Sorescu left his mark by obtaining that the magazine be moved to a new office, the "imposing" rooms on Săvinești Street No 3. He also infused the magazine with his "metaphoric-aggressive" style, including in the publicized polemics. In the late 1970s, Ramuri hosted criticism of the national-communist venues, engaging itself in polemics with writers Eugen Barbu and Corneliu Vadim Tudor. The latter two censured Sorescu's novel, La lilieci, as an attack on "national specificity"; in his reply, carried by Ramuri of December 1978, Sorescu ridiculed Barbu, signaling a push-back against the national-communist supremacy in arts and letters. Sorescu's friend and collaborator, Tudor Nedelcea, recalls that Ramuri was supposed to feature revelations about Barbu's habitual plagiarism, but that the Communist Party delayed its imprimatur for this piece, giving Barbu forewarning, and ample time to prepare his response. According to other accounts, including one by diarist Mircea Zaciu, Sorescu was blocked from expanding on this topic by the head censor, Dumitru Popescu-Dumnezeu, who warned Ramuri that they risked upsetting the Soviets. To Barbu's chagrin, Sorescu also managed to obtain an increase in circulation (which was handled by the local censorship and propaganda apparatus). This was granted after his friend, the poet Gheorghe Izbășescu, engaged in astroturfing on Ramuri's behalf, telling officials that Ramuri was in high demand among the readers of Onești. In addition to supporting liberalization in the arts, Ramuri had also created itself a sports page. It was largely dedicated to Romanian football, with contributions by Ilie Balaci and by Sorescu himself; both covered the exceptionally productive seasons of CS Universitatea Craiova.

Sorescu himself was seen as sufficiently compatible with the other strands of nationalism, including Edgar Papu's Protochronism. In 1977, Papu and fellow philosopher Constantin Noica established a "board of initiative" for a Ramuri supplement on the theory of culture, also obtaining support from Anghel and Mihai Șora. Though Protochronism was already supported within some of the Communist Party's higher echelons, the project was disavowed in 1978, after being vetoed by Leonte Răutu, and the Securitate proceeded to enhance its surveillance of Papu. In the early 1980s, Securitate informants centered their accusations on Sorescu's protegé, Gabriel Chifu, who had been brought in as a member of the editorial staff. Such allegations had it that Chifu, who had been awarded a national prize by the Union of Communist Youth, was in fact a favorite of the anticommunists—since his literary work had also been given a positive review by Lovinescu at Radio Free Europe. The controversy also divided the former writing and editorial staff, with Purcaru standing out as a supporter of Barbu, and interviewing him in October 1982. During their exchange, Purcaru alleged that Ion Caraion, who had since defected to the West and was emerging as a critic of the regime, had always been a spy for outside forces—including at Ramuri.

=== Serescu against the Securitate ===
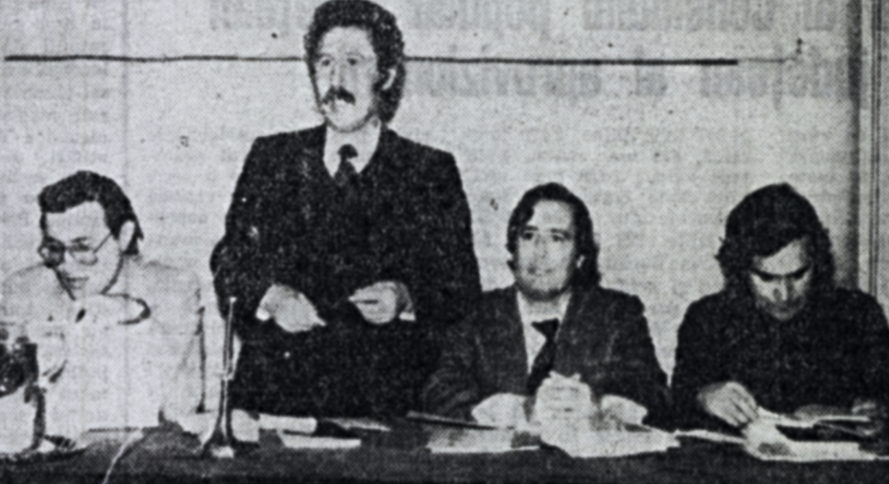
March 1983 session of Ramuri literary club; from the left: Dinu Flămând, Marin Sorescu, Justo Jorge Padrón, Omar Lara

Ramuri persisted in its attempts to celebrate Eliade, and prepared an issue marking his anniversary, fully printed before in April 1982. All copies had to be melted down, allegedly on Ceaușescu's orders, upon Eliade's publicized siding with the anticommunist priest Gheorghe Calciu-Dumitreasa. By May, Sorescu was being followed around for having briefly engaged with the Transcendental Meditation movement, which the communist regime had since banned. The affair almost resulted in his being banned from literature altogether, until Nedelcea began circulating a photocopied bibliography, providing communist officials with direct proof of Sorescu's international fame. Both the magazine and its writer were endorsed internationally in March 1983, when Ramuri's literary club hosted Justo Jorge Padrón and Omar Lara in Craiova. Writing in 2006, literary historian Valentin Tașcu, himself a contributor to Ramuri, argued that during the 1980s the magazine had been required to promote "politicized texts"—but also that it largely toed the party line, and was never "overzealous" in this respect.

In June 1984, the Securitate heard additional reports that, at a Ramuri conference, Chifu had told the audience that "inadequate people have been planted in all of society's key spots" and that the magazine now stood for a "supreme nostalgia", that of art for art's sake. This speech resulted in Chifu and all of his associates being closely monitored by the regime. Sorescu was still allowed to travel abroad, and was part of the Romanian delegation in Rome during December 1984. He was joined there by his former Ramuri colleague, Marino; the two were attending a function where it was announced that Marino had been shortlisted for the Herder Prize. According to Marino, the news sent Sorescu into a fit of jealous rage—contextualizing the reason why, upon his return to Craiova, Sorescu issued at least one article specifically downplaying Marino's scholarly contribution.

From March 1986, the National Theater Craiova opened a "poetry studio", co-hosted by Ramuri, which also made a point of showcasing Sorescu's work. With Romania advancing through the final stages of Soviet-style communism, Securitate officers were reviewing allegations that Sorescu had presented the staff of Radio Free Europe with his copy of Nicolae Steinhardt's samizdat (detailing Steinhardt's experience as a political prisoner of the communists). Steinhardt, by then a monk and librarian at Rohia, was also a contributor to Ramuri—in June 1985, he reviewed Doina Graur's book of religious cosmology. In January 1987, the magazine also hosted his essay on the life and times of Sofronie Miclescu, which touched on Miclescu's role in promoting the union of Moldavia and Wallachia during the 1850s. The text as sent by Steinhardt also included a disparaging reference to the anti-unionist leader, Nicolae Vogoride, as pramatie primejdioasă ("dangerous scoundrel"); this was eliminated from the published version, prompting Steinhardt to declare his bemusement, in a letter he addressed to Sorescu: "Someone apparently jumped in to defend that inveterate intriguer".

In late 1987, Ramuri's almanac edition also doubled as a Festschrift marking Eliade's recovery. Put out by Mircea Handoca, it featured a contribution by Steinhardt, who had been Eliade's personal friend. Its other focus was Marcel Proust, whose correspondence with Antoine Bibesco and other Romanians was rendered in translation—as the beginning of a longer series. Also in 1987, the Securitate intervened to prevent Ramuri from publishing two articles about Noica, who was presented therein as "Europe's greatest philosopher." The July 1989 issue of Ramuri appeared with significant and unexplained delay. Rumors collected at the time by diarist Liviu Ioan Stoiciu had it that the magazine had not been sufficiently enthusiastic in covering preparations for the 14th Communist Party Congress, and that censorship forced it to reprint that issue. According to Sorescu's own testimony, he was still being attacked for his involvement in the Transcendental Meditation affair, and effectively sidelined in October, when "I had been replaced in all by name with Romulus Diaconescu"; Ramuri never printed issues for November and December 1989. That period also witnessed Sîrbu's death in Craiova. The funeral, which had two writers and two Jiu Valley miners as pallbearers, was attended by at least some of Ramuri's editors.

=== 1989 Revolution and aftermath ===
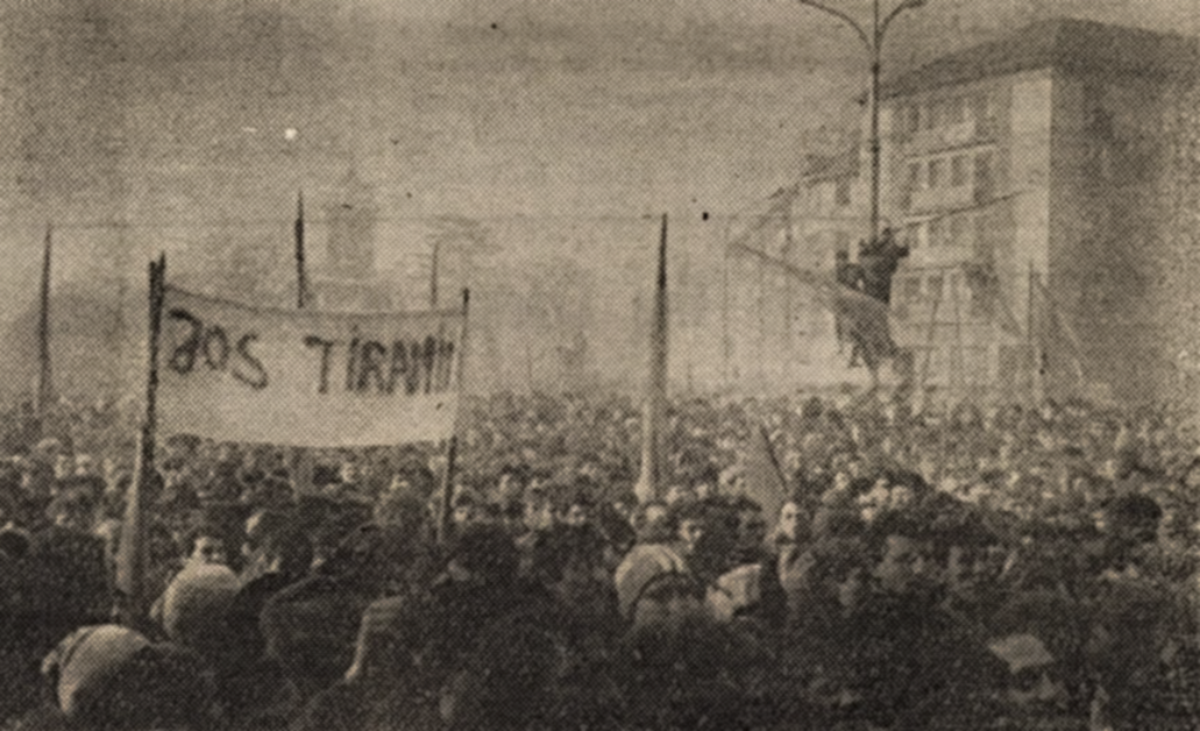
Anti-Ceaușescu rally in Craiova at the height of the Romanian Revolution

According to Nedelcea, Sorescu, though mainly active from Bucharest, was still manager of Ramuri during the Romanian Revolution of December 1989, which ended communism. As reported by the same source, Sorescu was invited to participate in the revolutionary events, but refrained from such engagements; Nedelcea also argues that foreign powers extended his friend an offer to take over as President of Romania, but that Sorescu again declined, after realizing that he was expected to endorse Transylvanian devolution in exchange for such honors. Ramuri reappeared with a special issue on 25 December 1989, under the provisional title of Ramuri în Libertate. Another, regular, issue appeared in January 1990 with an editorial note by Sorescu, announcing to Romanians that: "The nightmare is over". Also that month, Sorescu resumed his traveling abroad. He established a collaboration with Radio Free Europe, through both Lovinescu and Virgil Ierunca, praising them at Ramuri, and reportedly informing them that he was "no longer afraid". While visiting the RFE's studio in Paris, he also met the exile Paul Goma, who remained his staunch critic; as a sign of reconciliation, Sorescu invited Goma to write for his magazine.

Ilie Gheorghe and Tudor Gheorghe in Sorescu's play, Vărul Shakespeare; photograph published by Ramuri of March 1990

For a while, Ramuri persevered in its attempts to establish an international profile. It set up an International Festival of Poetry, which had its first edition in 1990. Its main guests included authors from Socialist Yugoslavia, among them Petru Cârdu, the Romanian Serb. Sorescu stayed on at Ramuri only until February 1991, when he came into conflict with his colleagues, who voted to have him sacked. In their justification, which earned support from the overseeing Writers' Union of Romania, they alleged that Sorescu had been dictatorial in his behavior, and disrespectful of other writers (among them Manolescu, Ana Blandiana, and Eugène Ionesco). Sabin Gherman, whom Sorescu had included on Ramuri's editorial team in 1991 (where he remained until 1992), defended the decision: "we did not sign the request against the poet Sorescu, but against Sorescu as clerk, as editor-in-chief." As reported by Gherman, Sorescu had made it a habit of vetoing the entire staff, "chang[ing] the entire content" as he saw fit, and based on personal animosities—against Gheorghe Grigurcu and Emil Cioran, and against any political content.

Sorescu responded in Adevărul daily, suggesting that the Ramuri staff resented his a-political line (including his refusal to publish current-affairs commentary), but also agreeing to hand in his resignation. He ridiculed the new editorial team, headed by Chifu, as "tiny venomous monsters", reproaching his own past leniency toward them; a note in Adevărul and a piece by Gheorghe Tomozei endorsed such claims, arguing that Chifu and the others were virtual unknowns in the literary world. Sorescu was instead criticized by Libertatea daily and by writer Mircea Dinescu, who noted that, under his watch, Ramuri was losing 1 million lei each year. Among Sorescu's defenders, novelist Fănuș Neagu acknowledged that the latter claim was true, but also asked the Writers' Union to disclose the budgetary expenditures of other magazines which it sponsored. Literary historian Theodor Codreanu regards Sorescu as primarily a victim of "radical" post-communist revisionists, who included both Lovinescu and Manolescu, and who, he argues, wanted to "fully suppress" traditions such as Protochronism. Another scholar, Paul Cernat, writes: "Sorescu's ouster from at Ramuri magazine [...] and his subsequent resignation from the Writers' Union were seen by many as consequences of his reprehensible political views".

The April 1991 issue, which was the first one to feature Chifu as editor, also witnessed severe budget cuts; for a while after, Ramuri appeared in smaller format, and with a noticeable decline in the quality of its print. In October, Carol Sebestyen, the columnist at Orizont, described Ramuri as heavily politicized, with current-issue articles of "questionable taste". Despite his resignation, in September 1992 Sorescu was identified as Ramuri editor by Fernand Jué company of Villers-sous-Saint-Leu, France, which sent the magazine a rotary printing press. According to Chifu's critics, this potential was entirely wasted, as the press ended up being used for labeling locally produced spirits. Over those months, Chifu turned the magazine into a bimonthly. According to a review in Orizont, its quality actually increased: "Splendidly illustrated with works by Francis Bacon, this magazine is lively, exciting, and with a certified intellectual ascent." In December 1992, Ramuri appeared with a note condemning the Stolojan Cabinet for having massively reduced public expenditure, including for state-dependent cultural venues.

== Current edition ==
The magazine reappeared in 1993, when economic policy was being steered by the Văcăroiu Cabinet. Chifu stayed on as editor-in-chief, but some of his attributions were supplanted by an "honorary editorial board", whose members were authors Dinescu, Ștefan Augustin Doinaș, Mircea Iorgulescu, Eugen Negrici, and Virgil Nemoianu. In April 1995, România Literară looked back on Ramuri's 90-year existence as "exemplary for the evolution of the Romanian literary press, for the confrontation between 'local patriotism' and value, between conjectural obligations and an aesthetic program". The unsigned columnist cited Chifu's argument that Ramuri had returned to its "animators" stage, as under Făgețel, being pushed into it by a constant need to secure money. The columnist also noted with satisfaction that the magazine was largely modeled on România Literară itself, to the point of copying the textual arrangement, and praised Marius Ghica as a translator of Lorand Gaspar, but also questioned some of the content choices (in particular the publication of a "rambling" diary by George Astaloș). Largely a conventional literary publication, which covered cultural events throughout Romania, Ramuri maintained some of its Oltenian focus, particularly in poetry. Sorescu was at the time the Minister of Culture, serving until his death in December 1996. According to Nedelcea, his demise was hastened by the injustices he had suffered (including the Ramuri affair), and also by a "dubious vaccine" he had received "at some airport."

Over the following years, the magazine, whose triumvirate staff included Chifu, Diaconescu and Ghica, went into another period of relative decline. This was attested in October 1998 by Marino, the former Ramuri house critic, who saluted the appearance in Craiova of a rival literary sheet, Mozaicul. According to Marino, Ramuri was by then a "semi-official magazine", and as such affected by the pitfalls of "official culture"—including, "above all, a lack of money." In his personal notes, Marino describes himself as flattered by Chifu's attempts to reconnect with him, though he also notes that he was never interested in being reactivated as a literary critic, since he did not consider himself one. Viewed as "mediocre" when compared to Mozaicul in a 2000 piece by critic Cezar Paul-Bădescu, Ramuri had a relaunch and graphic redesign in April 2002.

In later years, the magazine continued to be regarded as not entirely up to its previous standards. In his 2006 dictionary entry, Tașcu noted that Ramuri had always had a "likable aesthetic format", adding: "except for these past years". That year, the Ramuri Foundation, as editor of the magazine, qualified for state financing by the National Cultural Fund, to the amount of 4,550 lei. It also still obtained contributions from writers such as the Bucharest-based Horia Gârbea, who had been assigned a permanent column in 2008. Chifu and his co-editor Coșoveanu reportedly focused on their activities at the Writers' Union, and neglected Ramuri, with the former of two leaving for Bucharest in 2005. Chifu, who relinquished his office at the magazine in 2009, later recounted that "endless financial constraints" had been a permanent stress, and that Ramuri would not be able to survive without state sponsorships. In 2010, Ramuri's management went to the poet and literary critic Paul Aretzu, who had been associated with the magazine since his debut in 1971. He formed a new editorial team, co-opting Florea Miu and Gabriela Gheorghișor as his deputies. Dumitru Chioaru and Nichita Danilov became regular columnists. By 2018, the magazine was again struggling: it had lost the Săvinești offices to a court decision, and had moved out to a small apartment at IJK apartment bloc, on Olteț Street. Here, the four-person staff shared space with the local branch of the Writers' Union.
