= Lucreția Suciu-Rudow =

Romanian poet

Lucreția Suciu-Rudow (September 3, 1859 – March 5, 1900) was a Romanian poet from Austria-Hungary.

She was born in Oradea. Her father Petre was a Romanian Orthodox priest active in the church school system in Oradea and a protopope in Beliu, who later settled in Ucuriș. Her mother Maria was a poet. The family home at Ucuriș hosted a small literary circle attended by George Coșbuc, Gheorghe Bogdan-Duică and Aurel Popovici. Lucreția, a cultivated woman who knew French, German and Hungarian, made her debut in 1884 in Familia, with the poem "Suvenir" ("Souvenir"). She regularly published poems in the magazine until 1895. In 1889, she published her collected poems in a single volume printed at Sibiu, also publishing poems in Tribuna and a translation of Gotthold Ephraim Lessing's Laocoön. She married Wilhelm Rudow, who had obtained a doctorate in philosophy at Halle University; a philo-Romanian, he wrote a German-language history of Romanian literature. From April to November 1897 at Oradea, the couple published Foaia literară, a weekly magazine that ran for 30 editions. Its contributors included Coșbuc, Maria Cunțan and Ilarie Chendi. Her own submissions included verses and a romantic tale, Logodnica contelui Stuart ("Count Stuart's Betrothed"). Her work was popularized by Convorbiri Literare, which printed a number of her poems in 1898. Its patron Titu Maiorescu saw in her verses the sure signs of a Transylvanian cultural renaissance. Another review where she appeared was the Arad-based Tribuna poporului. Her last years were marked by suffering from tuberculosis.

Suciu-Rudow's work consisted almost of love poetry. According to one critic, she possessed an authentic sensibility, sharply heightened by her illness and by a strong sentimental disappointment. She was influenced by Mihai Eminescu, from whom she borrowed motifs, images and rhythms, reproducing their atmosphere. However, she went beyond mere imitation: her lines were charged with sincerity, spontaneity and a characteristically feminine delicacy and grace. German Romantic poets such as Nikolaus Lenau and Heinrich Heine, whom she knew very well, were another influence, as seen through her light melancholy, pained regret caused by incomprehension, faded love and resignation. Her tone was consistently one of romantic sentimentalism, and she surpassed all prior Transylvanian female lyric poets through her musicality, elegant language and discretion. At times, her verses have the liveliness of Coșbuc's rhythms, and the theme of darkness recalls his "Vântul" and "Prahova". Several of her poems, such as "La drum" ("On the Road"), point to greater potential through their naturalness, pictorial images and adequate rhythm. Maiorescu, commenting about "La scaldă" ("Bathing"), noted its "carefree naturalism, almost at the level of ancient liberties", while Nicolae Iorga found that the same sonnet could be compared to Victor Hugo's "Sara la baigneuse".
