= Sămănătorul =

Romanian literary and political magazine between 1901 and 1910

Sămănătorul (Semănătorul)
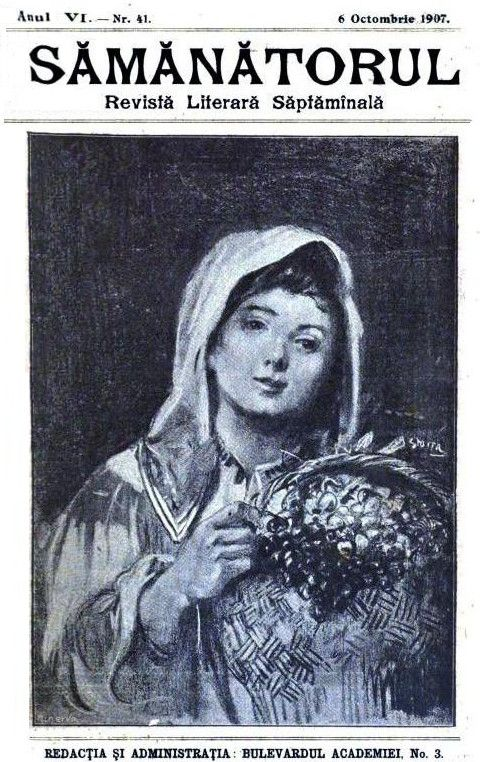
- Sămănătorul issue, cover dated October 6, 1907
- Editor: George Coșbuc, Nicolae Iorga, Ștefan Octavian Iosif, Mihail Sadoveanu, Alexandru Vlahuță
- Categories: literary magazine, political magazine
- Frequency: weekly
- Total circulation: approx. 300
- First issue: December 2, 1901
- Final issue: 1910
- Company: Editura Minerva
- Country: Romania
- Language: Romanian

Sămănătorul or Semănătorul (pronounced [səmənəˈtorul / semənəˈtorul], Romanian for "The Sower") was a literary and political magazine published in Romania between 1901 and 1910. Founded by poets Alexandru Vlahuță and George Coșbuc, it is primarily remembered as a tribune for early 20th century traditionalism, neoromanticism and ethnic nationalism. The magazine's ideology, commonly known as Sămănătorism or Semănătorism, was articulated after 1905, when historian and literary theorist Nicolae Iorga became editor in chief. While its populism, critique of capitalism and emphasis on peasant society separated it from other conservative groups, Sămănătorul shared views with its main conservative predecessor, the Junimea society, particularly in expressing reserve toward Westernization. In parallel, its right-wing agenda made it stand in contrast to the Poporanists, a Romanian populist faction whose socialist-inspired ideology also opposed rapid urbanization, but there was a significant overlap in membership between the two groups. Sămănătorul's relationship with the dominant National Liberal Party was equally ambiguous, ranging from an alliance between Sămănătorul and National Liberal politician Spiru Haret to Iorga's explicit condemnation of 20th century Romanian liberalism.

Promoting an idealized interpretation of local history, basing its aesthetic ideals on the work of national poet and conservative essayist Mihai Eminescu, the publication advertised itself as the voice of oppressed Romanians in Transylvania and other areas controlled by Austria-Hungary prior to World War I. Its irredentism, as well as its outspoken criticism of the political and cultural establishment, made Sămănătorul a popular venue for young Romanian intellectuals from both the Kingdom of Romania and the regions surrounding it. The traditionalist literary faction coalescing around the magazine was generally opposed to modernist literature and the aesthetics of modern art, but was more tolerant of Symbolism. In time, Sămănătorul became host to a subgroup of the local Symbolist movement.

Although short-lived, Sămănătorul was a major influence on later Romanian literature and culture in general. Its legacy stood at the center of cultural debates between traditionalism and modernism lasting throughout the 20th century. While Iorga personally tried to revive it with the magazines Drum Drept and Cuget Clar, Sămănătorism was adopted by other traditionalist or agrarian currents, and was a contributing factor to the cultural tenets of local far right and fascist groups. During the interwar period, it also made a significant impact in Bessarabia (a region since divided between Moldova and Ukraine). The Sămănătorist ideology itself was traditionally criticized for encouraging isolationism and xenophobia, as well as for its flirtation with antisemitism. In literary and art criticism, the term Sămănătorist acquired pejorative connotations, denoting specific pastoral and patriotic clichés.

== History ==
=== Origins ===
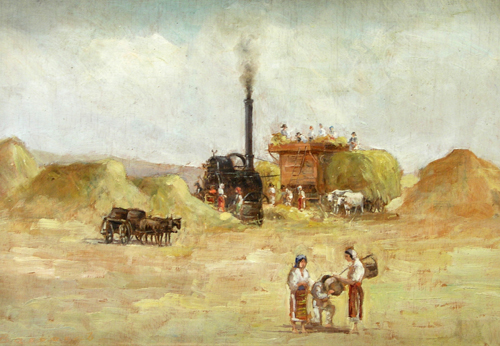
Ludovic Bassarab's La treierat ("Threshing"), showing peasants in Romanian dress around a combine harvester

The establishment of Sămănătorul was linked by researchers to a set of significant events of fin de siècle European economic history. Spanish historian Francisco Veiga placed the emergence of Sămănătorul in direct connection to a European-wide evolution of capitalism and related phenomena affecting the middle class: "In the traumatic circumstances of late 19th and early 20th century imperialist crises [...] and the rejection of urban-industrial society by the petty and medium bourgeoisie threatened by the crisis of capitalism, Sămănătorism can be identified with those groups of intellectual movements seeking to preserve national identity in front of threats, by resorting to an idealized past." Alongside the "identity crisis" provoked by "the traumatic advance of industrial modernization inside a country with a majority peasant and illiterate population", researcher Paul Cernat discusses the "decline" of local boyar aristocracy as issues preparing the ground for Sămănătorul and like-minded journals. Likewise, Swedish art historian Tom Sandqvist views Sămănătorul's focus on the peasant community as a source of legitimate culture as connected with economic change and "emerging industrialization": "In the mid-1870s grain prices had declined catastrophically, and it became more and more obvious that the image of the grateful farmer and the 'natural' village community as bearer of true Romanian culture was false and did not correspond very well with a reality characterized by utmost poverty, misery, autocratic boyars, ruthless profiteers, moneylenders, and village gendarmes". The emergence of Sămănătorism and Poporanism, Sandqvist notes, happened "in spite of this—or rather because of it", since both still proclaimed "the special character of Romanian culture as deriving from the traditional village community." Researcher Rodica Lascu-Pop presents a similar perspective, discussing Sămănătorism as "an echo of mutations occurring in society at the beginning of the century: the acute crisis of the peasant issue [...], the social gap between the urban and rural environments."

The historical moment represented by Sămănătorism has also been linked by historians with various tendencies in Western culture. Its rejection of industrial society was thus seen as equivalent to the sentiments expressed in the poems of Robert Frost in the United States or Francis Jammes in France. Comparatists John Neubauer and Marcel Cornis-Pope described the magazine as part of the larger phenomenon of "populism and agrarian nationalism" in East-Central Europe, together with Poland's Głos magazine and Slovakia's Naturizmu current, with the ideologies of Hungary's Dezső Szabó or the Népi írók, Válasz or Kelet Népe groups, as well as with the political program of Estonia's Jaan Tõnisson. Commentators have also found specific similarities between Sămănătorul and various cultural or political movements in Poland, from the Galician intellectuals' interest in the local peasantry during the late 19th century (Chłopomania) to the ideology of Roman Dmowski's National Democracy. Literary critic Mircea Anghelescu also places the Sămănătorist movement's beginnings in conjunction with intellectual fashions prevalent in Romanian culture during the national revival and before World War I: the patriotic travel literature of Vasile Alecsandri, Grigore Alexandrescu and George Melidon; the Neo-Brâncovenesc style in Romanian architecture; and the rediscovery of national Romanian costume by Romanian Queen Elisabeth (Carmen Sylva). His colleague Valeriu Râpeanu contrasts the initial rise of Sămănătorism with the moment of "crisis" experienced in Romanian letters, at a time when a generation of major writers—Ion Luca Caragiale, Barbu Ștefănescu Delavrancea, Alexandru Vlahuță etc.—were approaching the end of their careers.

In large measure, the propagation of Sămănătorist ideas was also helped along by the sentiment that the conservative establishment had abandoned the cause of Romanians living in Transylvania, Bukovina and other regions controlled by Austria-Hungary (particularly those who, the new intellectual leaders cautioned, were threatened by Magyarization policies). The group's protest against the political class' perceived lack of patriotism was joined with what Veiga defines as "an offshoot of renewed Romanian agitation in Transylvania". In parallel, Veiga notes, the group was also reacting against "an opportunistic international policy" and the penetration of foreign capital on the Kingdom's markets. At the time, however, the National Liberals were reluctantly committed to supporting King Carol I's alliance with the Central Powers, and, through it, with Austria-Hungary. According to literary historian Z. Ornea, the will to demonstrate "the unity of the Romanian population in matters of specific spiritual life" formed one of the characteristics of Sămănătorism.

=== Establishment ===
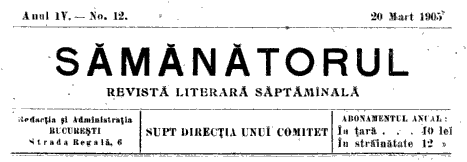
Magazine logo, issue no. 12, dated March 20, 1905. The paper is published Supt direcția unui comitet ("Under the direction of a committee")

Published in the capital Bucharest, Sămănătorul was co-founded by two already established writers, Alexandru Vlahuță, from the "Old Kingdom", and the Transylvanian-born George Coșbuc, in late 1901. Both of them were already known as editors of magazines with traditionalist agendas: Vlahuţă had founded and edited the magazine Vieața, while Coșbuc had done the same with Vatra. Among the original staff of writers were several formerly associated with Vieața: Ștefan Octavian Iosif, Dimitrie Anghel, Ion Gorun, Constanța Hodoș and Vasile Pop. The regular contributors included Ion Agârbiceanu, I. A. Bassarabescu, Panait Cerna, Elena Farago, Emil Gârleanu, Octavian Goga, Constantin Sandu-Aldea, Ioan Slavici and I. E. Torouțiu. Other notable collaborators throughout the early years were Zaharia Bârsan, Paul Bujor, Ilarie Chendi, Virgil Cioflec, Alexandru Davila, Sextil Pușcariu and Constantin Xeni, alongside the lesser known Ion Ciocârlan and Maria Cunțan.

The new publication received support and funds from Spiru Haret, the National Liberal Education Minister, who saw in it an opportunity for improving the lifestyle of peasants, for raising the interest of intellectuals nationwide, and for endorsing planned changes to the state-sponsored education system. It is sometimes described as a successor to Semănătorul, a magazine published in Bârlad during the 1870s, and to a similarly titled magazine published in Galaţi during 1899. In the years after it was set up, Sămănătorul inspired the creation of like-minded smaller journals published in provincial cities, from Craiova's Ramuri to Bârlad's Făt Frumos. Its doctrine was largely replicated in Transylvania by the publication Luceafărul, founded in 1902 by Goga and his fellow activists Alexandru Ciura and Octavian Tăslăuanu.

The new magazine's first-ever issue carried the date of December 2, 1901. Printed in cooperation with Editura Minerva publishing company, it was financed and owned by Iosif, who also worked on the editorial staff. The editorial office itself was located at Regală Street, No. 6, near Calea Victoriei (on present-day Ion Câmpineanu Street) and in the same building as Minerva's printing presses. The editorial piece introducing the first-ever issue, written by the two main editors but left unsigned, carried the title Primele vorbe ("The First Words"), and expressed concern over the lack of positive messages in Romanian literature. This overview was completed in the second issue by Coșbuc's piece, Uniți ("United"), which condemned what he called "imported" and "sick" literature.

The paper frequently alternated the spellings of its name over the following years: founded as Sămănătorul, it became Semănătorul from 1901 to 1902, returned to the original spelling until 1909, and changed back to the e spelling in its final year. The two were literal synonyms for "the sower", but their metaphorical meaning was more complex. Historian Irina Livezeanu wrote: "The Romanian word and concept is not easy to translate. It derives from the verb a semăna or to sow, or plant (seeds), and suggests that literature should be fundamentally rural and agrarian, concerning itself with the life and customs of the 90 percent of the Romanian population who were indeed peasants or 'sowers'." The term also refers to the dispersion of ideas among the general public, in line with Haret's own agenda. Literary historian George Călinescu connects the programs of Vieața (whose name, an antiquated spelling for viața, means "the life") and its successor by commenting on their titles: "[Sămănătorul] was supposed to deal with 'life' and 'plant' ideas into the masses." He also notes that the notion had been highlighted by Vlahuţă in one of his poems, also titled Sămănătorul:

Pășește-n țarină sămănătorul
Și-n brazda neagră, umedă de rouă,
Aruncă-ntr-un noroc viața nouă,
Pe care va lega-o viitorul.

The sower steps into the field
And into the black furrow, moist with dew,
He casts his chance for a new life,
One which the future only can ensure.

The finality of this program was seen by Râpeanu as comprised by the poem's final part, which reads:

Tu fii ostașul jertfei mari, depline:
Ca dintr-un bob să odrăslească mia,
Cu sângele tău cald stropește glia!

You be the soldier of the highest, fullest sacrifice:
For one grain to father one thousand others,
Let your warm blood spill over the furrow!

=== Sadoveanu and Iorga's arrival ===
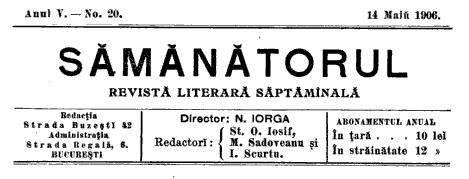
Magazine logo, issue no. 20, dated May 14, 1906. Nicolae Iorga is credited as the editor in chief, Mihail Sadoveanu and Ștefan Octavian Iosif are two of the other editors

In 1903, Sămănătorul was joined by Mihail Sadoveanu, the future novelist, who was described by critic Tudor Vianu as the group's greatest asset. It was also that year when Nicolae Iorga began publishing his first articles for the paper. In Sanqvist's definition, Iorga, "one of the most representatives of Romanian ethno-nationalism beside the philosopher and poet Lucian Blaga", was the publication's "most important contributor", while Neubauer and Cornis-Pope refer to him as "the most powerful and original thinker of the [East-Central European] region." By 1904, Sadoveanu had achieved national fame with his debut volumes, published simultaneously by Minerva and praised by Iorga in his chronicles for the magazine (one of which proclaimed 1904 "the Sadoveanu year"). In parallel, Iorga's slowly introduced his own tenets, beginning with a May 1903 article titled O nouă epocă de cultură ("A New Cultural Epoch"), which called for setting up a national culture beyond social class distinctions, and referred to the "wicked monkey business" and spiritual "corruption" arriving from the Western world. He later took charge of a permanent Sămănătorul column, carrying the title Cronică ("Chronicle").

Iorga's other contributions were polemical pieces, targeting various of his colleagues who opposed what he defined as a new direction in historiography (școala critică, "the critical school"): Bogdan Petriceicu Hasdeu, Grigore Tocilescu, V. A. Urechia and A. D. Xenopol among them. One such piece read: "With all my powers, I follow a cultural and moral ideal for my country, and whoever shall stand in the way of this, my life's most cherished goal, is my enemy, an enemy I will never spare no matter what, however unpleasant or painful this may prove, no matter what troubles I may encounter as a result." His position received endorsement from another Sămănătorul contributor, literary chronicler Ilarie Chendi, who alleged that, since Romanian literature was facing "spiritual decadence", the main exponents of a moral consciousness were historians of the new directions (a reference to Iorga, Ion Bogdan and Dimitrie Onciul).

Iorga's criticism of his older peers often focused on topical and personal issues, such as when he argued that Xenopol was a poor judge of literary value, who had promoted mediocre writers (from Xenopol's own wife Cornelia "Riria" Gatovschi to Victor Vojen). Elsewhere in his articles for the magazine, he called Tocilescu "a scholar of the least substantial species and a critic whose norm is the personal gain". In 1904, also involved in the polemic was Ion Găvănescul. Originally acknowledged by Iorga as a figure of importance on the academic scene, Găvănescul was referred to as "a scoundrel and a coward" in one of his new articles for Sămănătorul. Another such piece criticized researcher George Ionescu-Gion, whose published work on the history of Bucharest was judged inconsistent and poorly structured by Iorga (arguments he retracted decades later). In tandem, his articles for the magazine defended linguist Sextil Puşcariu, who had sided with his colleague's methods but was being himself exposed to criticism from Luceafărul. In 1905, Iorga also used Sămănătorul to express some regret for the tension reached during the conflict between his generation and the older Hasdeu or Xenopol: "It was also the fault of the young men, all of us being too keen on advertising and enriching ourselves, at the expense of old men who had not been much focused on consuming, and were far from being satisfied."

In 1905, editorial leadership over Sămănătorul was assumed by Iorga. This moment, Veiga argues, signified a change in policies and appeal: "Sămănătorul only managed to acquire have its own force when it progressively transformed itself into a catalyst for a whole series of young discontent intellectuals". Integrated within such changes of discourse, Veiga writes, were Iorga's "fickle" opinions, which had turned into suspicions that the National Liberal Party was endorsing clientelism and a camarilla regime. Despite its growth in influence, the publication had a modest circulation by Romanian standards, reportedly publishing no more than 300 copies per issue. George Călinescu, who indicates that Iorga was trying to link the venue with "a clearer program" and "his own direction", assesses that such goals failed to introduce a fundamentally new approach, and contends that the magazine continued to maintain a "secondary role" when compared other platforms of its kind.

=== 1906 campaign, successive splits and Iorga's departure ===
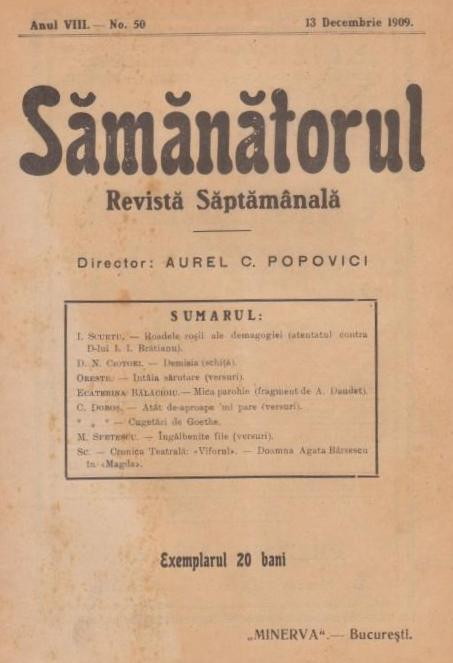
Front page of Sămănătorul under Aurel Popovici's direction, December 1909 issue

Iorga's form of campaigning produced significant results in March 1906, when, incited by the Bucharest National Theater's decision to host a performance in French (instead of translating the play into Romanian), he organized a boycott and mass student rallies which degenerated into street battles. Later in 1906, Iorga had ended his association with the magazine. On October 22 of that year, Sămănătorul announced that the split occurred in amiable terms: "Mr. N. Ioga [...] announces us that his many duties prevent him from carrying on as the magazine's [editorial] director, but that he wishes us best of luck and wants us to triumph". However, according to one account, he had decided to leave after his editorial policy had made him the target of criticism in other magazines.

Iorga went on to publish a new journal, Neamul Românesc, and created, together with the Iași-based agitator A. C. Cuza, the Democratic Nationalist Party, which stood for a similar agenda but added explicitly antisemitic content targeting the Jewish Romanian community. That same year, a left-wing dissident group, comprising Sadoveanu, parted with Sămănătorul to affiliate with Viața Românească journal, newly founded by the Poporanists Constantin Stere and Garabet Ibrăileanu. A third dissident wing emerged at the same stage: Chendi, Iorga's former associate, left the circle in 1906 to create the rival periodical Viața Literară (set up and disestablished in 1907). According to Cernat, Sămănătorul itself experienced "reactionary ideologization" following the breakups.

The paper steadily declined over the following four years. This phenomenon is described by Râpeanu as owed to a loss of direction: "[Sămănătorul] no longer enjoyed the same impact, no longer sparked the interest or the polemics of 1903–1906. It brought nothing new to the landscape of Romanian literature. One could say that, in parting with Sămănătorul, N. Iorga took its soul with him." Among the last major issues affecting the journal's history was the peasants' revolt of 1907, which aired the social tensions of the Kingdom and was met with violence by the National Liberal cabinet of Dimitrie Sturdza. According to Sandqvist, traditionalist perspectives "clashed badly with reality" during the events, leading "almost immediately to a regressive approach among many intellectuals [...] who had previously encouraged and endorsed Romania's turn to the West".

== Political outlook ==
=== General principles ===
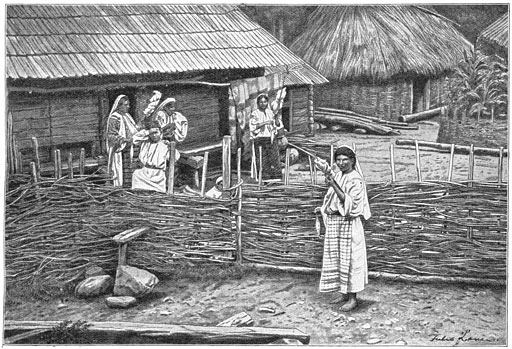
A peasant household near Bistriţa Monastery, ca. 1906

A dominant portion of Sămănătorul's outlook sought to define and preserve the notion of Romanian specificity through the lens of Romantic nationalism. This vision, Veiga notes, was "the first systematic attempt" of its kind in Romania, and implied recourse to "intellectual myths." Attached to the portrayal of peasants as models of excellence was Iorga's own scholarly perspective on Romanian history and the origin of the Romanians. By that moment in his career, Iorga had come to construct a theory according to which Romanian peasants living in the Early and High Middle Ages had organized themselves into communal republics ruled by representative democracy, and was arguing that the Romanian state itself had grown organically around an unattested uncodified constitution. This went in tandem with his suggestion that there was an ancient solidarity between the traditional social classes of free peasants and boyars. Veiga, who views this concept as a major component of Sămănătorism, interprets it as the "model of Volksgemeinschaft—real or fictitious". In order to recover that cohesion, the historian was proposing a specific set of institutions, from political bodies representing the villages (obști) to credit unions working for the benefit of peasants.

A figure who inspired much of Sămănătorul's outlook was the deceased national poet and cultural critic Mihai Eminescu, who, as both a conservative and nationalist, had been a maverick member of the Junimea literary club. Researcher Ioana Both describes the "reactionary" circle formed around the magazine as a main source for the "cult of Eminescu", as well as for some of the earliest Eminescu anthologies. In a 1903 article for the magazine, Iorga welcomed the publication of his posthumous writings as the revelation of a "new Eminescu", or "a complete man" opposed to the modern times which had "shattered" mankind. The same author deemed Eminescu's activism an "Annunciation" for the new ideology of a "healthy race". According to Iorga's rival, cultural historian and classical liberal thinker Eugen Lovinescu, the historian shared in particular the "reactionary" attitudes of Eminescu: a "hatred" of the bourgeoisie who endorsed Romanian liberalism, support for "protectionism" and the nostalgia for "patriarchal life".

Another main element of Sămănătorul's preoccupations was didacticism, twinned with calls for education reform: the magazine urged the education system to actively and primarily dedicate itself to the cause of peasants. This closely followed the National Liberal agenda, which had facilitated innovation in the field after 1898, and was in tune with the wide-ranging reforms pushed by Spiru Haret. In Veiga's account, the interest in educating the lower classes was partly owed to European precedents: the Jules Ferry laws in France and the Realschule system in the German Empire, as well as the efforts of Romanian Transylvanian teachers to compete with the officially-endorsed Hungarian-language institutions of learning. In parallel, the policy reflected Iorga's belief that spreading awareness of Romanian culture would cement the unity of Romanians on either side of the Carpathian Mountains. According to historian and comparatist Ștefan Borbély, an additional reflection of the group's educational theory was its encouragement of a "public fantasy" by depicting children as "nasty" human beings who need to be kept in tight check.

=== Radical nationalism ===
The rejection of cosmopolitanism by Sămănătorul implied the recourse to arguments that many cultural historians have described as samples of "xenophobia". Historian of ideas Lucian Boia discusses Sămănătorism among the earliest nationalist currents which promoted isolationism and promoting the Romanians' "own specific genius", rather than trying to remedy Romanian marginality on the world stage by accepting Westernization. He paraphrases this view as: "[Romanians] are not Western and nor should they try to become Western." Cultural historian Lucian Nastasă refers to Sămănătorul's attitudes as an attempt to impose "defensive prophylaxis" on Western ideas, and "a sort of spiritual autarky". In criticizing the "old school" of historians, Nastasă notes, Iorga was in large part reacting against historians who did not value ethnocentrism in history, as well as airing professional and personal grievances.

The 1906 campaign against cultural Francophilia was nevertheless explained by Iorga himself not as hostility toward French culture, but mainly as a belief that Romania needed to emancipate itself from foreign influence. Iorga had maintained a poor impression of Parisian society (in particular its Latin Quarter) from the early 1890s, when he had first visited the city. His claim, echoing the sentiments expressed decades earlier by Eminescu, was that France's influence stood for two distinct models: a negative one, of "coffeehouses and taverns" which had wrongly been perceived as factors of civilization by "our youth"; and a positive one, represented by "the French literary and scientific societies", and supported by "the sacred family of French bourgeoisie, which is the nation's foundation." He also claimed that the upper class' preference for French was tantamount to a loss of national character, "the history of a ruling class' decline and a people's straying away from the natural path indicated by its past and leading into its future." Some of these views were echoed by other key affiliates of Sămănătorul, such as Coșbuc (who believed that the commonplace use of foreign languages among the cultivated was expanding the gap between the elite and the mass of the people). Primarily focused on condemning the perceived pessimism of other currents, Primele vorbe editorial also stated the goal of doing away with the "mockery" and "sullying" of Romanian language by "those who scatter empty phrases".

The attack on foreign influence was nevertheless limited, being contained by the ambiguous stances of its leaders. According to Valeriu Râpeanu: "There was talk of [Iorga's] opacity and the fight against translations and literature in general. N. Iorga was nevertheless demanding [...] the expansion of the translated works area to all sets of European literature: German, English, Italian, Russian, Nordic." Boia also notes that Iorga was not an isolationist, having already pioneered research into Romania's traditional links with the Eastern European sphere.

Iorga's contributions for Sămănătorul occasionally stood as manifestations of his antisemitism, as was the case with a November 1904 article. The text was structured around the allegation that Iași city had been taken over by the non-emancipated Jews and the policies of Zionism: "Iaşi is three-quarter Jewish. They own its wealth, its life, its activity. The flame of Zionism was lit and burns more brightly over there. We [Romanians] only have two things in Iaşi: the school and the church. And the King of Romania arrives into [the city] persecuted by the filthy business-minded existence of another nation. Through his acts and his deeds, our past and present are again inextricably linked in opposition to the pagan and hostile alien. For no matter how long the polluted wave of the gain-seeking ones shall be sweeping over us, the land is ours. And the wind shall at once take with it the chaff it brought upon us, and we shall endure."

A leading presence among the political theorists contributing to Sămănătorul was the Transylvanian Aurel Popovici. Political scientist and literary critic Ioan Stanomir notes a paradox in the synthesis of platforms endorsed by Popovici: a proponent of federalization in Austria-Hungary rather than an advocate of the irredentist cause (inventor of the United States of Greater Austria concept), but a conservative voice in line with those of his Sămănătorul colleagues, the intellectual leader was also a vocal supporter of scientific racism and racial antisemitism. Popovici's essay Naționalism sau democrație ("Nationalism or Democracy"), serialized by Sămănătorul from 1909 to 1910, outlined its author's growing admiration for authoritarianism. While the conservative tone was preserved by references to the 18th century theorist Edmund Burke and by an outspoken critique of social contract philosophy, Naționalism sau democrație mirrored other theories about the organic, popular, nature of Romanian statehood, and borrowed from the racial theories of Eminescu, Arthur de Gobineau and Houston Stewart Chamberlain. The approach, Stanomir writes, was "counterfactual". The essay also depicted Jews in general as anti-Romanian, profiteering and manipulative, while claiming that they exercised their power by controlling the Cisleithanian and Romanian press (Neue Freie Presse, Neues Wiener Tagblatt, Adevărul, Dimineața). Its title alluded to its central theme, which is Popovici's belief that democracy was an enemy of national identity (coupled with his claim that Romania had an opportunity to choose between the two systems).

=== Sămănătorul, Junimism and mainstream conservatism ===
While Sămănătorul had emerged from a partnership with the National Liberals, Iorga's background made him close to Romania's traditionalist conservatism, represented at the time by the Junimea and the Conservative Party (the National Liberal's competitor within the Kingdom's two-party system). The main point of contention between him and the other groups was irredentist policy: like Nicolae Filipescu and other dissenting Conservative, Iorga objected to the political current's inclination toward preserving the status quo on the Transylvanian issue. Discussing this ideological transition, Ioan Stanomir noted: "The hybridization [of Iorga's discourse] allows for the integration of a nationalist and populist seam."

In addition to referencing the Junimist Eminescu, the arguments put forth by Iorga owed much to the Junimea doyen and Conservative Party politician Titu Maiorescu. Like Maiorescu, Eminescu and Iorga both cautioned against the National Liberal version of modernization and Westernization, which they viewed as too imitative and fast-pace to be naturally absorbed by Romanian society ("forms without substance"). However, Stanomir notes, the newer discourse, with its references to a supposedly ancient legislation and radical criticism of the 1866 Constitution, was a radical break with the Junimea worldview: "The distance between Iorga's critique and the Junimist hypothesis is obvious and can be identified in the weight that national tradition is assigned with the ideological discourse. At no moment in its evolution did Junimism, as an ideal form of conservative liberalism, intend to correlate constitutional deconstruction with the praise of an ancient constitution that would have preceded modernity. The fundamental flaw of the 1866 Constitution [in Junimea's opinion] was most of all its inadequacy, and this inadequacy could be gradually corrected by stimulating a bourgeois environment and by increasing the constitutional norm's very efficiency." Overall, Stanomir proposes, Sămănătorism stood for a break with Junimist "Victorianism" by the "imposition of a Romantic paradigm", a process in which "the stem of 'reactionarism' [produced] a form of heterodox conservatism".

While Maiorescu and his circle of followers generally upheld the values of art for art's sake and neoclassicism in front of didacticism, there was a measure of overlap with traditionalist currents in Maiorescu's theories about the inspirational value of Romanian folklore, as well as in his endorsement of the poporan ("people's") and realist literature illustrated by the work of Junimists such as Ion Creangă or Ioan Slavici. There followed numerous rapprochements, made possible by the measure to which Junimism was opening itself to traditionalism and nationalism shortly after 1900. Sămănătorul's existence coincided with a final transition in Junimist ideology, during which the club's magazine, Convorbiri Literare, came to be led by scientist Simion Mehedinţi, who adopted an agenda closer to that of nationalist groups. According to Z. Ornea, the aged founder of Junimea had, for reasons unknown, chosen not to enter a fight with a didacticist current he would have otherwise been likely to reject. Before Maiorescu's retirement, Mehedinţi had even contributed to Iorga's journal and, Ornea notes, remained "a Sămănătorist of strict observance who only lacked the gifts of an apostle." In highlighting the closeness between Convorbiri Literare and the traditionalist venue, George Călinescu also notes that they shared contributors between them, citing the cases of short story writers I. A. Bassarabescu and Nicolae Gane.

These developments had as their side effect a schism within Junimea itself, provoked when Maiorescu's disciple Mihail Dragomirescu created his own magazine, Convorbiri Critice. Opposed to Convorbiri Literare, the new publication sought to reinstate and closely follow Maiorescu's early theories, seeking to extend their application into the 20th century. However, Dragomirescu's own ideological approach was also relatively close to that of Sămănătorul, accepting some of its nationalist and didacticist guidelines. Convorbiri Critice therefore became the center of a club comprising various authors formerly affiliated with either Sămănătorul or Făt Frumos. Another isolated Junimist to resist Sămănătorist literature was novelist Duiliu Zamfirescu, who spoke out against the views on peasantry promoted by current, as well as against Maiorescu's views on poporan works, and who promoted his own form of conservatism. Reviewing these choices, Ornea argued that there were still essential links between Zamfirescu's views and those of his Sămănătorist adversaries.

=== Sămănătorul, socialist groups and Poporanism ===
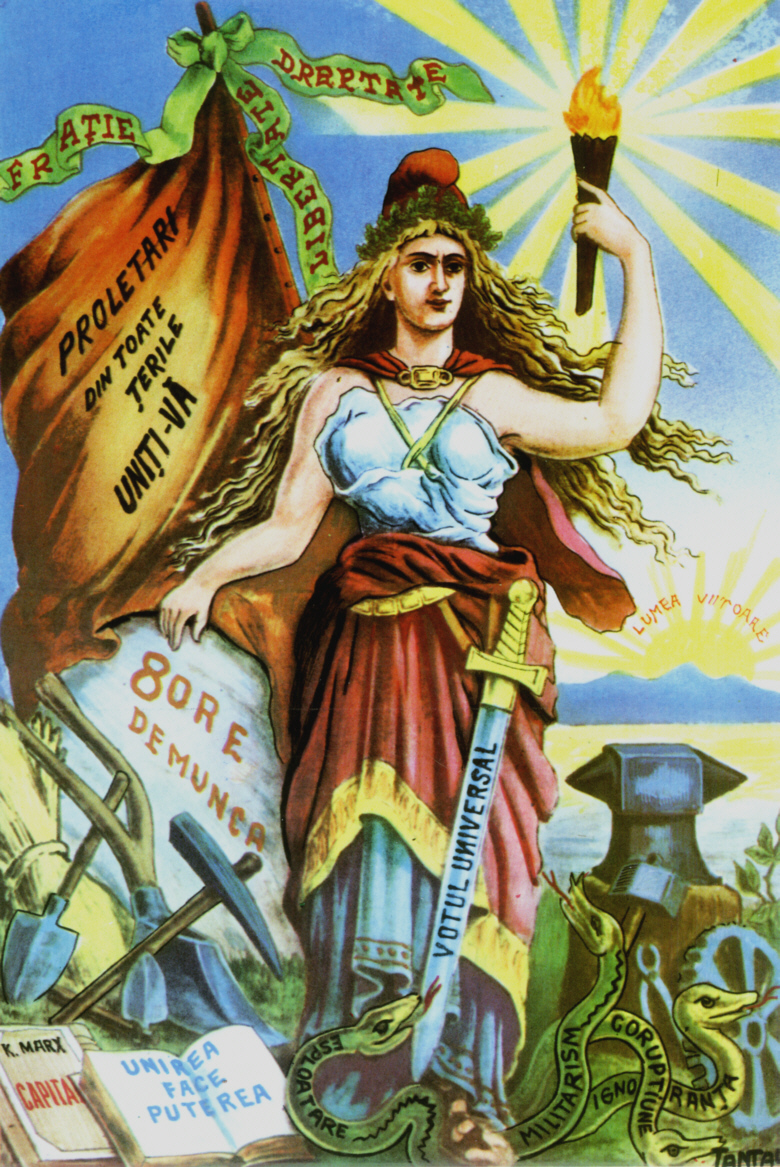
Socialist imagery in an illustration for Lumea Nouă literary review, 1895

On the left-wing of the political spectrum, the Sămănătorists met the advocates of socialism, who had survived the fall of the Romanian Social Democratic Workers' Party. Although the two currents disagreed over central issues, they also held a set of common beliefs, particularly in matters of literary theory. While he had entered a polemic with Vieața, the leading socialist figure and literary critic Constantin Dobrogeanu-Gherea admired (and probably inspired) Vlahuţă's branch of didacticism, preferring it to early Junimism. According to Călinescu, the entire Sămănătorist movement was a mutation of Dobrogeanu-Gherea's ideology, which "subordinated art to a social goal": "The nationalists kept the central point which suited them, that is art as a means, and only replaced the goal [...]. Even some of the ideals are shared between them. The socialists display interest in the peasants, this being our proletarian class for the time being; the nationalists, as the peasants they themselves are, are of course revolutionary peasantists."

Critic Mihai Zamfir, who notes that Dobrogeanu-Gherea was by then blending his Marxism into a "more autochthonous" perspective on politics, also argues that he and his colleagues at Contemporanul review were by then becoming aware that Romanian socialist literature was failing their expectations. In his assessment, the local product of Marxist guidelines was "sub-mediocre", the theorist himself being "perfectly aware" of such inadequacies. Zamfir concludes that "the more and more vociferous nationalists around Sămănătorul" were one of the factors to replace "socially-themed" currents, and that their success prompted Dobrogeanu-Gherea to part with literature. Likewise, Râpeanu notes that, contrary to the Marxist leader's expectations, Contemporanul and its 1890s satellite Literatură și Știință had not "managed to set up a current", and that they compensated by publishing traditional authors such as Vlahuță.

Sămănătorul also competed for the public's attention with the left-leaning populist movement, Poporanism—the latter owing some inspiration for its rural socialism to the Narodnik movement of the Russian Empire. Despite the generic disagreements, the two groups shared views on a number of topical issues, and even a number of partisans. Lucian Boia identified the main difference as one between the "patriarchal" views of the Sămănătorists and the "more social" perspective of Poporanism. A similar point was earlier made by Călinescu, who noted that the Poporanists were "nationalist democrats" rather than socialists, and that they advocated amending the traditionalist pronouncements for reaching the same basic goals. Historian Ion Ilincioiu describes both movements as being rooted in "Romantic philosophy", Sămănătorul's "aggressive" anti-capitalism being opposed to the Poporanists' attempt at reforming the system from within.

== Literary and artistic credo ==
=== Aesthetics ===
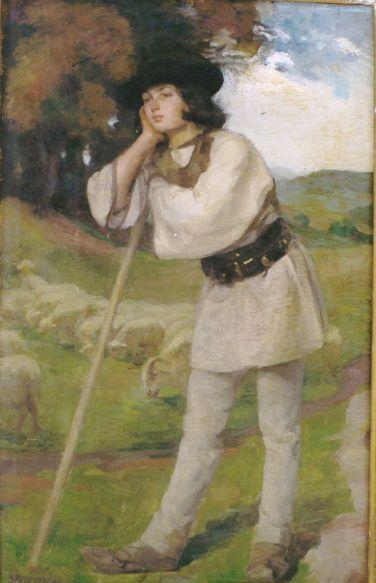
Ipolit Strâmbu, Ciobănaș ("Shepherd Boy"), 1907

Sămănătorul's views on aesthetics, Romanian literature and Romanian art were closely connected to its discourse about Romanian specificity, the peasant class and didacticism. Discussing the Sămănătorist stage of Iorga's career, Sandqvist notes: "In Iorga's opinion literature and culture in general must be oriented toward the specific nature of the Romanian people and [...] bring forth a love for the Romanian village and its people. To him art has a specific ethical-ethnic function, a mission to stimulate and to express the Romanian farmer, in accordance with the notion of the need for the artist and the poet to unite in a 'holy' union with the woods, the rivers and the whole of nature in a constant uprising against a civilization that has alienated man from his natural, original existence." Such pronouncements on the matter were reported with critical detachment by historians: Veiga writes that the peasant promoted by Sămănătorul was "archaic and eternal, very 'decorative' and bucolic", while Sandqvist refers to both Sămănătorists and Poporanists as producing "nationalistic anthems", "unctuous songs of praise to the Romanian peasant and the Romanian village", as well as "pathetic glorifying of the past". According to Paul Cernat, the Sămănătorist worldview favored, instead of both modernity and art for art's sake, "an idyllic, rudimentary-populist, picturesque-ethnographic and sentimental moralism." Other researchers have also described Sămănătorist writings as being primarily characterized by excessive patriarchal nostalgia.

One essential theme of Sămănătorist literary theory was the imagery of urban alienation. In Călinescu's definition, the group reacted against what it perceived as "the neuroses [and] the putrefaction of the urban class", and was demanding instead "a 'healthy' literary production, which could only be rural." Art and literary critic Dan Grigorescu notes in this nationalist guideline the opposition between "the 'tentacular' city, the 'killer' city, [and] the patriarchal image of rustic life." On the margin of the Sămănătorul circle, this Sămănătorist sensibility was specifically identified in some poems written by Octavian Goga during the same years. In matters of style, the Sămănătorist circle was also interested in prolonging the legacy of Junimist writers, starting with Vlahuţă (who adhered closely to or imitated Eminescu's poetics). The Junimist affiliate and folk writer Ion Creangă was one of Sămănătorul's recommended sources of inspiration for prose writers. However, Tudor Vianu notes, this was questionable, since Creangă's uncomplicated "rural authenticity" made him "the least Sămănătorist among our writers."

Committed to preserving the legacy of painter Nicolae Grigorescu as a mainstay of Romanian visual arts, Sămănătorism also touched the field of art criticism. Vlahuţă, a great admirer of Grigorescu, had already dedicated him a monograph in which he stated his special appreciation for the painter's pastoral themes: "And how handsome the shepherds guarding Grigorescu's flocks! And how proud. It's as if they were kings, monarchs of the mountains, that is how they walk, how they stand, how they gaze upon their realms." Such praise of Grigorescu was regularly featured in the magazine's art column, signed by writer and collector Virgil Cioflec, and in Iorga's art essays, which describe Grigorescu as a discoverer of Romania's genius loci. The magazine hailed the painter as the model to follow, but only selected those aspects of his work which it could fit within its approach, largely ignoring his urban-themed works. Sămănătorism directly encouraged visual artists occasionally described as "Grigorescu's epigones", who concentrated on rural, pastoral and picturesque subjects. The category notably includes two genre painters, the Transylvanian Ipolit Strâmbu and the Brăila native Arthur Verona, followed closely by Ștefan Popescu. The Tinerimea Artistică society, which grouped some of the Sămănătorist-inspired painters alongside older and younger artists, upheld Nicolae Grigorescu's style as an alternative to the academic art of the day, and borrowed elements from newer European-wide manifestations of Art Nouveau, but did not articulate an aesthetic program.

=== Cultural confrontations ===
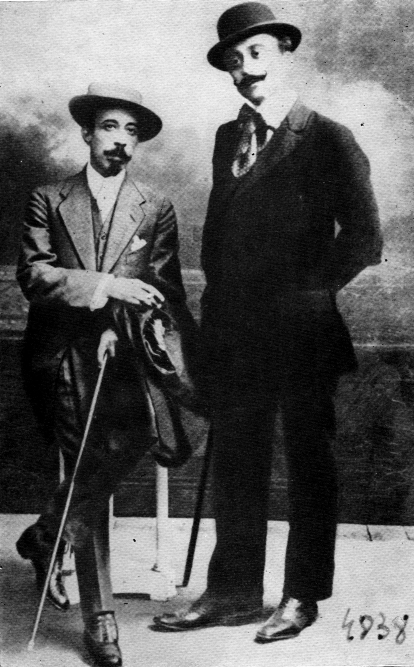
Ștefan Octavian Iosif (right) and Dimitrie Anghel

The rise of Sămănătorism was hotly contested by cosmopolitan or decadent trends, which were inspired by French-imported Symbolism and set the ground for avant-garde and modernist literature. The magazine found one of its main rivals in poet and theorist Alexandru Macedonski, recognized as the doyen of the Romanian Symbolist school and an enemy of traditionalist literature even before the year 1900, who put out the magazine Literatorul. The controversy was taken to the public sphere: a regular of the Kübler Coffeehouse, Macedonski is reported to have publicly mocked the Sămănătorists who had reserved the table opposite him. By 1908, criticism of traditionalist currents was taking the forefront in the activities of other Symbolist figures: the rebellious poet Ion Minulescu and the professional critic Ovid Densusianu, who openly suggested a literature based on urban models. As early as 1905, Densusianu had begun a polemic with Sămănătorul and the Poporanists by means of his own publication, Vieața Nouă, accusing his adversaries of hopelessly trying to cut Romania from the worldwide context and from progress itself.

Despite such heated exchanges, the magazine stressed the importance of a writers' solidarity: Iorga's articles on this topic are credited by some with having helped in the 1909 establishment of a Romanian Writers' Society. By then, Sămănătorul was itself acquiring a Symbolist section (albeit one more akin to the neoromantic school), primarily illustrated by Iosif and fellow poet Dimitrie Anghel (who also used the magazine as a testing ground for their collaborative poetry experiments, which were signed with the common pen name A. Mirea). Also included in this faction were other young authors, such as Ştefan Petică, Al. T. Stamatiad, Alice Călugăru and Elena Farago. According to Cernat, such collaborations evidenced the "identity break among the 'conservative' wing of autochthonous Symbolism." Another paradox was the presence of writers with modernist tendencies among the occasional contributors to Sămănătorul, including the radical Minulescu and the moderate Densusianu. Eugen Lovinescu, who moved between currents and later became a figure of eclectic modernism, is also known to have tried his hand at becoming a Sămănătorul contributor and even to have supported the 1906 campaign against French influence. For part of its existence, the magazine even hosted translations of texts by French Symbolists, decadents or Parnassians. While these associations were seen by George Călinescu as additional proof that Sămănătorul lacked a coherent program, Cernat discusses them as part of a wider transition at the end of which Symbolism reemerged as classical and assimilable.

The internalized Symbolist tendency irritated Iorga, who, in 1905, used Sămănătorul to condemn the floral imagery of Anghel's writings as having been inspired by an urban and "boyar" garden. Five years later, when both had ended their association with the magazine, Iorga returned with an article in Neamul Românesc, explaining that he considered Anghel's poems to be a form of "contempt" for a traditionalist venue. In Călinescu's opinion, Iorga was by then giving a disproportionately positive reception to writers of little value, which he held to mean that, under Iorga's direction, Sămănătorul was transforming itself into a venue for the least important traditionalist authors. Râpeanu also writes: "Like any critic, [Iorga] could be mistaken, particularly in cases where he did not take into consideration the aesthetic criterion and expressed words of sympathy [...] for minor writers who endeavored, with no calling, to apply the magazine's principles." A similar assessment was provided by literary critic Ion Simuţ, who noted that Iorga tended to promote all his followers in the literary world, regardless of value, failing to see an actual difference between Vasile Pop and Sadoveanu. Sadoveanu had also noticed this trait, and recalled not having been flattered by Iorga's explicit comparison between his works and those of Pop.

Objections to Sămănătorist attitudes were also being expressed outside the modernist circles. Romania's celebrated dramatist and comediographer Ion Luca Caragiale, although himself a former Junimist somewhat close to traditionalist circles such as Vatra, found Sămănătorist literature amusing, and made it a target of his sarcasm. The left-leaning Henri Sanielevici, a pioneer of sociological criticism, was also known for setting up in 1905 the Galați-based review Curentul Nou, which was in large part dedicated to anti-Sămănătorism. Among the main points of contention between Sanielevici and Iorga were the latter's didacticism and its application: Sanielevici claimed that, by endorsing Sadoveanu's early works, which depicted scenes of adultery and rape, Iorga had effectively contradicted his own views about morality in art. One of the most prominent conflicts was that between Ilarie Chendi and his former colleagues, even though Chendi was still being inspired by Sămănătorist aesthetics. Chendi and the "Chendists" (among them Zaharia Bârsan, George Coșbuc, Ion Gorun and Andrei Naum) are said to have been avoiding their Sămănătorist rivals at the Kübler, where the Sămănătorists only held session during mornings.

== Legacy ==
=== Early influence ===
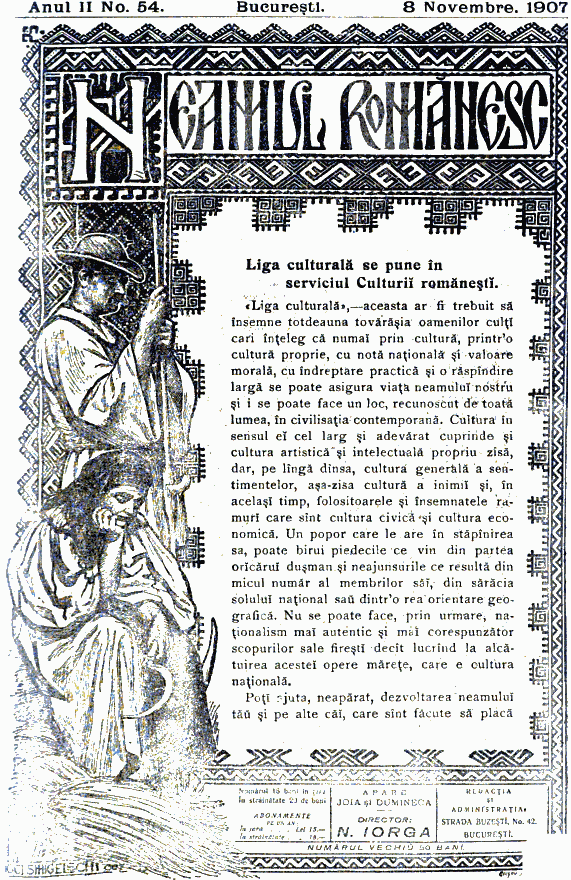
Neamul Românesc issue, cover dated November 8, 1907

Among the first direct ideological successors of Sămănătorul was Iorga's own Democratic Nationalist Party. According to Veiga: "In this new phase, Iorga did not resort to very different arguments, but merely sought to render a more politically explicit expression to the literary aesthetics of Sămănătorul." In Stanomir's account, the "avatars" represented by the Democratic Nationalist program and Neamul Românesc are, like Sămănătorul, episodes in a "series marked by the recovery and valorization of the Eminescian assets". Despite its intention of addressing the peasantry, Sămănătorul is thought to have mostly appealed to white-collar workers. Călinescu, who contrasted its approach with the elitism and professionalization advocated by Junimea, concluded: "[Semănătorul] primarily gathered writers of little culture, officers, young men who did not complete their education [and] autodidacts [...]. The magazine made itself well liked by schoolteachers, provincial professors, Romanians outside the borders, and, in spreading throughout these environments, it educated the masses in view of accepting proper literature. It is true that the very same readers were left with horror for all things 'alien', 'unhealthy', but when did it ever happen that the multitudes reach a level required for the understanding of more refined art? One could say that Semănătorul and all the other like-minded publications assumed the thankless mission of promoting Junimist ideas all around, while renouncing the [art for art's sake principle] at the risk of compromising themselves in front of literary historians less sympathetic to a magazine's goals." Sandqvist also notes that the main group to be attracted by traditionalism, particularly after the 1907 revolt, mostly comprised "underpaid classicists, historians, and lawyers who composed the nation's overstaffed bureaucracy".

Before and during World War I, Sămănătorism (like Poporanism) became a favorite target of ridicule for the young modernist or avant-garde writers and artists. In Sandqvist's opinion, this answered to "a certain exclusivism" of the two established currents, which, he notes, only served to provoke "an avant-garde reaction." One of the first avant-garde magazines to host articles specifically aiming the traditionalist currents was Simbolul, published by Tristan Tzara, Ion Vinea and Marcel Janco in 1912. Vinea in particular followed up with attacks on the Sămănătorist legacy by means of other publications, primarily Facla and Chemarea, while his colleague in Iași, dramatist and future critic Benjamin Fondane, vocally rejected Sămănătorists and Poporanists as "talentless writers" destined to be "forgotten". According to Dan Grigorescu, Sămănătorul magazine and its affiliates had a paradoxical role as a "catalyst" for Expressionism, which manifested itself in Romanian art beginning in the 1910s, and which contemplated urban life as a tragic experience: "However odd it may seem, Sămănătorism created a favorable atmosphere for ideas akin to those which would lead to the revelation of Expressionist attitudes in the Occident." Some former Sămănătorists migrated toward Symbolist or post-Symbolist publications, as in the cases of traditionalist-inspired prose writers I. Dragoslav (who began collaborating with Insula, a magazine published by Minulescu in 1912) and Gala Galaction (who joined poet Tudor Arghezi and socialist journalist N. D. Cocea in editing a succession of leftist and modernist reviews).

By the 1920s, Sămănătorism had firmly established itself as a tendency in Romanian academia, and, according to Lucian Nastasă, held back innovative approaches and promoted conformity. Iorga himself, convinced that the Sămănătorist tenets were still applicable, set up a series of journals which advertised themselves as reincarnations of the defunct publication; in addition to Neamul Românesc's literary supplement, these were: Drum Drept (1913–1947, merged with Ramuri in 1914) and Cuget Clar (or Noul Sămănător, "The New Sower", 1936–1940). Among the disciples who followed him in this attempt was the journalist Pamfil Șeicaru, noted for his more radical political opinions. The new venues prolonged Sămănătorism (or "neo-Sămănătorism") as a phenomenon of the interwar period, that is after the Transylvania's union and the creation of Greater Romania, based on Iorga's belief that the movement had survived its political context and was still relevant in setting cultural norms. Cultural historian Ileana Ghemeș notes that Iorga's claim was debatable: "At the beginning of the 1920s, when modernist artistic formulas where progressively making their offensive [...] felt, Nicolae Iorga was convinced that the 'anarchy' could be quelled by restating the ethical and ethnic factors as ones subordinating the aesthetic. The times were nevertheless different, and the recovery of old Sămănătorist themes and motifs had less and less powerful effects with a public that was more visibly aligned with the European values of the day."

=== Interwar neo-Sămănătorism and the far right ===
Among the main purposes of Iorga's new magazines was a campaign against its opponents on the cultural scene, particularly modernism and the new avant-garde. Drum Drept, which stated its respect for the other surviving platforms of traditionalism (including the Poporanist Viaţa Românească), was noted for its rejection of literary critics who viewed Sămănătorist aesthetics with dislike or reserve: Densusianu, Dragomirescu, Lovinescu. The anti-modernist campaign was taken to a new level by Cuget Clar, noted for its claim that Lovinescu and Arghezi had together turned Romanian literature into what Iorga deemed "monstrosities". It heralded a nationalist offensive, which accused various Romanian writers, usually modernists, of having promoted and endorsed "pornography". At the time, Iorga and his followers were also stating that the local avant-garde had an alien, primarily Jewish, source. In the 1930s, the campaign against non-traditionalist literary works made its way into the pages of Iorga's own synthesis of literary history, Istoria literaturii româneşti contemporane ("The History of Contemporary Romanian Literature"), which partly consisted of excerpts from his earlier articles. In tandem, his rival Lovinescu was developing criticism of the neo-Sămănătorist agenda into an ideology, which fused urban-themed modernism, classical liberalism and literary impressionism with direct references to some of Maiorescu's art for art's sake principles. His essays described Sămănătorul and its descendants as factors preventing cultural development, and named Sămănătorism "the cemetery of Romanian poetry". Neo-Sămănătorism had a special impact in Bessarabia, a former province of the Russian Empire which formed part of Greater Romania: soon after the political union, traditionalism acquired a special force, but its position was challenged by young writers who followed Symbolism or Expressionism (Alexandru Robot among them). Although motivated by nationalist didacticism and supportive of Cuget Clar, writer Nicolai Costenco and his Viața Basarabiei review were more receptive of innovation, and even pioneered a symbiosis between the two cultural extremes.

In tandem, echoes of Sămănătorist ideology were fueling some of the new movements aiming to reconfigure Romania's political scene. One such current was the version of agrarianism represented, in a post-land reforms age, by the Peasants' Party and the National Peasants' Party (both of which represented mutations of Poporanism). In tandem, the magazine was also a reference point for the far right or fascist movements which emerged during the late 1920s and early 1930s. The first among such groups was one formed around the poet-philosopher Nichifor Crainic, a sporadic contributor to Iorga's magazines, after he took over leadership of Gândirea journal. Crainic's main innovation was in linking ethnic nationalism and ethnocracy with the notion that the Romanian Orthodox Church was the guarantee of Romanian identity, therefore discarding the implicit secularism of Sămănătorist thought. Crainic's "Orthodoxist" views, Veiga notes, were closely related to the ideas of Russian émigré authors, from the Christian existentialism of Nikolai Berdyaev to the political radicalism of the Eurasianist theorists. Defining his group's exact relation to Sămănătorism in one of his Gândirea articles, Crainic stated: "Over the land that we have learned to love from Sămănătorul we see arching itself the azure tarpaulin of the Orthodox Church. We see this substance of this Church blending in with the ethnic substance." His own literary style was seen as a more robust form of neo-Sămănătorism by Lovinescu, and deemed "Orthodoxism with Semănătorist modulations" by literary historian Mircea A. Diaconu. In tandem, Crainic's rival on the far right, Trăirist philosopher Nae Ionescu, paid homages to Sămănătorul and Iorga's thought.

The Gândirist claim to Sămănătorul lineage was received with reserve by Iorga. While Istoria literaturii româneşti contemporane included Crainic and his magazines with the "signs of improvement" from modernism, it also made a point of criticizing "Othodoxism" as unrealistic and undesirable, and openly stated a secularist approach to politics. On the other side, the lack of religious ideals in the literature promoted by Iorga's neo-Sămănătorist magazines was discussed as a negative trait by Crainic and by Petre Pandrea, at the time a colleague and disciple of Nae Ionescu, who also noted that "the only exception" to this literary secularism was poet Vasile Voiculescu (published by both Cuget Clar and Gândirea).

At the end of this succession was the Iron Guard organization, established and led by A. C. Cuza's former disciple Corneliu Zelea Codreanu. Evolving into one of Romania's most notorious fascist groups, the Guard also took inspiration from several other sources, among which Sămănătorism was present: Codreanu, like his father Ion Zelea, had been convinced by Iorga's views on the peasantry, and, according to Veiga, his propaganda campaigns were ultimately set up in accordance with Sămănătorist and, to a certain degree, Poporanist models. Like the defunct magazine, Codreanu and his followers referenced Eminescu or borrowed selectively from the ideas of 19th century conservatism or Junimism. Codreanu is also known to have publicly praised Iorga for having first talked about "the Jewish peril". As another link with the Sămănătorists, the Iron Guard developed a complex but often close relationship with Crainic's movement, as well as with Nae Ionescu, and supported with them the "Orthodoxist" program. Nevertheless, one other group of Guard affiliates, formed by writer Mircea Streinul and Iconar review, promoted an alternative rural-themed literature which took its distance from Sămănătorul.

While he had a degree of sympathy for Italian fascism and corporatism, Iorga viewed the Iron Guard as dangerous for Romania. Having parted with Cuza by the 1920s, he was briefly co-opted by the National Peasants' Party, went on to serve as Premier, and, in the years leading up to World War II, joined those who advocated the authoritarian politics of Codreanu's bitter rival, Carol II. His publicized criticism of Codreanu's methods and the Iron Guard leader's answer played a part in escalating the entire conflict, and, after Codreanu's killing on Carol's orders, made Iorga a potential target for the movement's violent retribution. In November 1940, during the interval when the Guard set up the National Legionary regime (see Romania during World War II), Iorga became a victim of its assassins. This final action, was seen by Lovinescu, as well as by Stanomir and Veiga, as the equivalent of a political patricide.

=== World War II and communism ===
A new chapter of the clash between modernists and Sămănătorists was played out in the post-National Legionary era, following the Guard's clash with its nominal partner, Conducător Ion Antonescu, who set up a new authoritarian and Axis-aligned regime (see Legionnaires' rebellion and Bucharest pogrom). Braving the censorship imposed on modernism by Antonescu's rule, and holding Lovinescu as their example, the Sibiu Literary Circle publicized its own critique of Sămănătorist ideals. Formulated as part of a manifesto drafted by young essayist Ion Negoițescu, it popularized the disparaging term pășunism (from pășune, "pasture") to define neo-Sămănătorist literature, and alleged that its exponents were demagogues who glorified peasant values without themselves leaving "the comfortable armchairs of the city". Shortly after the Royal Coup of 1944, which brought Romania under Allied supervision, voices condemning Sămănătorism again made themselves heard publicly. Writing for the National Peasants' Party Dreptatea newspaper, literary critic Vladimir Streinu paid homage to Lovinescu, Densusianu and Dragomirescu for their previous role in bringing up for discussion the negative aspects of the current, and noted that their objections only had to be slightly adapted when reviewing "Orthodoxism" or other local nationalist currents. The use of the term Sămănătorist as a pejorative for the far right's aesthetics was also present in the discourse of Romanian-born modernist essayist and dramatist Eugène Ionesco, better known as a founding figure for the Theatre of the Absurd. Ionesco discussed interwar and wartime Sămănătorism and other traditionalist trends as symptoms of "a deep-seated intellectual affliction: the refusal of culture."

The negative assessments were later endorsed by literary historian Georgeta Ene, who noted: "Iorga's magazines have drawn around them a significantly large 'constellation' of minor writers and have produced a dull, edulcorated, inconsistent literature, which only went as far as to obstinately perpetuate themes originating in Sămănătorism, demonstrating their fundamental inability of aesthetically reaching the grandeur and sublime contained by Iorga's concept". According to Ileana Ghemeș: "Certainly, when compared with the modernist offensive, neo-Sămănătorist literature could appear anchored in entirely antiquated clichés. The section of the reading public to which this literature was addressed, situated far from the debates between ideas addressing the Romanian culture's paths of development after [World War I], ill-prepared for receiving the innovative tendencies supported by the modernist publications which had a very limited degree of propagation in the world of Romanian villages, continued to enjoy those traditionalist literary productions furiously defended by Nicolae Iorga."

New assessments of Sămănătorism and traditionalism followed the 1947–1948 imposition of a Romanian communist regime. During its first stage, when they created a local socialist realist current, the new cultural authorities imposed selective censorship on Romania's literary trends. There were, however, several meeting points with the aesthetics and policies promoted by Sămănătorul in matters of social and cultural discourse. The partial liberalization allowed by the Nicolae Ceaușescu in the late 1960s made room for a new aesthetic reaction to both communist guidelines and neo-Sămănătorism, leading from the recovery of interwar modernism and Western influences to the birth of local postmodern literature and the Optzeciști generation. During the following decades, as Ceaușescu's July Theses confirmed national communism and opened the path of isolationism, traditionalist and nationalist currents came to be officially reconsidered as ideological precedents. However, the period also saw the publishing of Z. Ornea's influential overview of Sămănătorist ideology, first printed in 1970. It took critical distance from the trend, and, literary historian Nicolae Manolescu suggests, thus stood against the renewed official endorsement for the Sămănătorist program. According to Ghemeș, the work also played an essential part in stimulating other such assessments on the current to be published in later decades, including Georgeta Ene's 1984 study of Iorga's neo-Sămănătorist periodicals.

A parallel recovery of Sămănătorist views is argued to have taken place in the Soviet Union's Moldavian SSR, formed from the bulk of the Bessarabia upon the 1940 breakup of Greater Romania. While the local population's cultural identification with Romania was officially discouraged and repressed during the adoption of Moldovenist ideology, the rural aesthetics of Sămănătorism were adapted to the proletarian themes favored by official culture. This phenomenon was later described by literary critic Iulian Ciocan in terms of cultural synthesis: "Sămănătorism was harnessed to the rumbling wagon of proletkultism. The original ideology was, of course, retouched. 'National specificity' was replaced with 'social class specificity', subordinated to 'proletarian internationalism', and the contrast between the idyllic village and the dehumanized city [...] is supplanted by the animosity between the agricultural proletariat and the (petty) bourgeoisie. The working class, attenuating the rift between village and city, is called to the forefront." According to Ciocan, the reaction against this merger was less significant than in Romania, even though postmodern authors also emerged in the Moldavian SSR.

=== Post-communist developments ===
A critical evaluation of Sămănătorism and its impact was still an important factor in cultural and political developments after the Romanian Revolution of 1989 succeeded in toppling communism. During the cultural debates of the early 1990s, literary historian and social critic Adrian Marino argued that the European integration of post-Revolution Romania was being held back by issues relating to its "fundamental social structure" and "the psychology specific to all shut-in traditional communities", since: "A rural and inescapably ethnicist, conservative, isolationist, traditionalist, Sămănătorist, populist Romania will never feel the need for 'Europe'. On the contrary, it will perceive in it a grave danger for the preservation of the 'national being'." In contrast to this situation, he placed his hopes for change with the young, educated and urban middle class familiarizing itself directly with Western culture or pre-communist cultural alternatives to Sămănătorism. Similarly, writer and critic Gheorghe Crăciun negatively assessed that Sămănătorul, alongside other defunct traditionalist publications, continued to dominate the standard reception of Romanian culture, particularly in matters of the Romanian curriculum after the year 2000. State-sponsored education, he assessed, rated Coșbuc and Goga higher than their modernist counterparts Ion Barbu and George Bacovia, and, overall, favored the "parochial, peasant, epic, ethnographic and dazed-metaphysical" elements in Romanian literature. In contrast, Valeriu Râpeanu listed Sămănătorul and Gândirea among the magazines with "essential contributions to asserting Romanian thought", and argued: "Speaking disparagingly about Sămănătorism, and in particular by deeming Sămănătorism an obsolete, backward vision lacking any literary value, has even become an act by means of which one invokes one's own aesthetic high ground."

Criticism of Sămănătorist traditionalism and its presence in various contexts was also voiced in later years. In one such case, historian Mihai Sorin Rădulescu argued that such tendencies had made their way into Romanian museology: "the Museum of the Romanian Peasant [...] and the Village Museum both show Romanians in accordance with Semănătorist tradition". In a 2007 article critical of Romania's educational policy, textbook author Dumitriţa Stoica described as an anachronism the presence of topics on Sămănătorism within the standard baccalaureate examination, noting that such subjects had already been stripped from the regular curriculum. In his 2008 book Iluziile literaturii române ("Illusions in Romanian Literature"), literary historian and theorist Eugen Negrici linked the perpetuation of neo-Sămănătorist guidelines with another nationalist current, protochronism, discussing them as equally negative phenomena: "Even though I feel no pleasure, I must admit that the ideological-literary movements of a Sămănătorist and Protochronist type appear to be durable, being strictly motivated by the ways in which Romanian society has evolved. They stand for both the protective impulse and the compensatory one [...]. At the first sign of a major peril, we shall be hearing the magmatic rumble of myths rising up again from the deep".

Following the Soviet collapse of 1991 and the emergence of independent Moldova within the Moldavian SSR's borders, the area witnessed a similar conflict of ideas. Discussing the phenomenon as an attempt to link the emergent unionist movement with traditionalist aesthetics still present on the Moldovan literary scene, Iulian Ciocan argued: "Unfortunately, the great majority of those Bessarabian Sămănătorists who 'cultivate' the masses are themselves uncultured persons. They view themselves as defenders of national values, but, in reality, nurture and exacerbate technophobia and autochthonism [...]. A large part of those who describe in their books the opposition between the (Moldovan) village and the (Russian) city, and who warn that Russification threatens our national identity have been faithfully serving the preceding Soviet proletkultism." A central element of the neo-Sămănătorist literary trend in Moldova, Ciocan argues, is the importance it assigns to the traditionalist writer Ion Druţă.
