= Vasile Pop (writer) =

Romanian prose writer

Vasile Pop (June 14, 1875 – 1931) was a Romanian prose writer.

Born in Domnești, Vrancea County, his parents were the farmers Ion Pop and Ecaterina (née Rareș). After attending primary school, he worked as a mechanical laborer. An autodidact, he then became an English and gym teacher at the Constanța Naval Institute. He made his published debut in Munca newspaper in 1890, and headed Evenimentul from 1904 to 1905. His first book was the 1899 Fleacuri. His work appeared in Sămănătorul, Făt-Frumos and Luceafărul, and he sometimes signed as Acadin, Gh. Bradul, V. Fr., Gh. Scytul or Const. Fulger. He wrote one book of poor-quality poems, Versuri (1900). He authored the prose volumes Din ocna vieții (1902), Râs și plâns (1906), Povești hazlii (1908) and Din viața speluncelor (1923), while his novels included Domnița Viorica (1905), Americana îndrăgostită (1920), Cuceritorul de inimi (1921) and Vândută de propria-i mamă (1922). Sensationalist in character, these were marked by melodramatic endings and a strikingly poor aesthetic taste.
