= Ion Ciocârlan =

Romanian writer

Ion Ciocârlan (July 12, 1874–1942) was a Romanian prose writer.

Born in Străoane, Vrancea County, he graduated from the normal school in Iași in 1895, becoming a schoolteacher. His published debut came in Sămănătorul in 1902, under the pen name Mărioara Florian. His first book was the 1903 Pe plai. Other magazines that ran his work include Epoca, Viața Românească, Luceafărul, Drum drept and Ramuri; he sometimes used the pseudonym Mărioara F. His books Traiul nostru (1906), Inimă de mamă (1908), Vis de primăvară (1909), Fără noroc (1914), La vatră (1925) and Flămânzii include short stories, sketches and tales. Ciocârlan also authored the novels Du-te, dor... (1936) and Tainele munților (1940). Melodramatic and tending to create idyllic scenes, he drew particular inspiration from his observations of rural life.
