= Alice Călugăru =

Romanian poet

Alice Ștefania Stănescu Călugăru (pen name Alice Orient; July 4, 1886 – 1924) was a French-born Romanian poet.

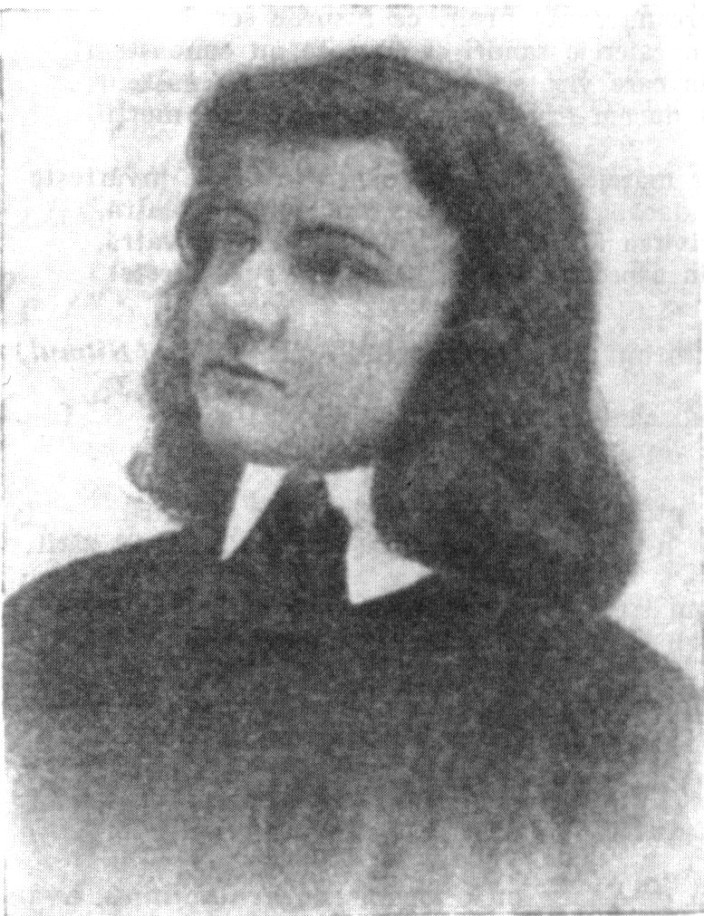
Alice Călugăru, was a French-born Romanian poet.

== Biography ==
Born in Paris, her parents were Ștefan Stănescu Călugăru, an officer in the Romanian Army, and his wife Maria (née Carabella). She attended high school in Bucharest, where she was classmates with George Topîrceanu, and graduated in 1907. She began publishing verses at an early age, in Sămănătorul (1903) and Dumineca (1905). The only poetry book she put out was Viorele (1905). Other magazines that ran her work include Analele literare, politice, științifice, Viața literară, Luceafărul, Ramuri, Convorbiri Literare and Viața Românească.

She moved to Paris after 1908, marrying journalist Louis Constant Edgar Müller in 1921. In France, she signed her work with the pen name "Alice Orient". In 1914, she entered her poem "Les perles" into the Femina literary competition, winning second prize. She and her husband traveled in Belgium and South America. She died of consumption, probably in Switzerland. A mysterious personality with a tragic destiny, she can be identified with the adventurous Lilis from the partly autobiographical 1924 novel La tunique verte. Her lyricism, modern sensibility, sensual sharpness and the character of her imagery anticipate interwar poetry.
