= Străoane =

- Commune
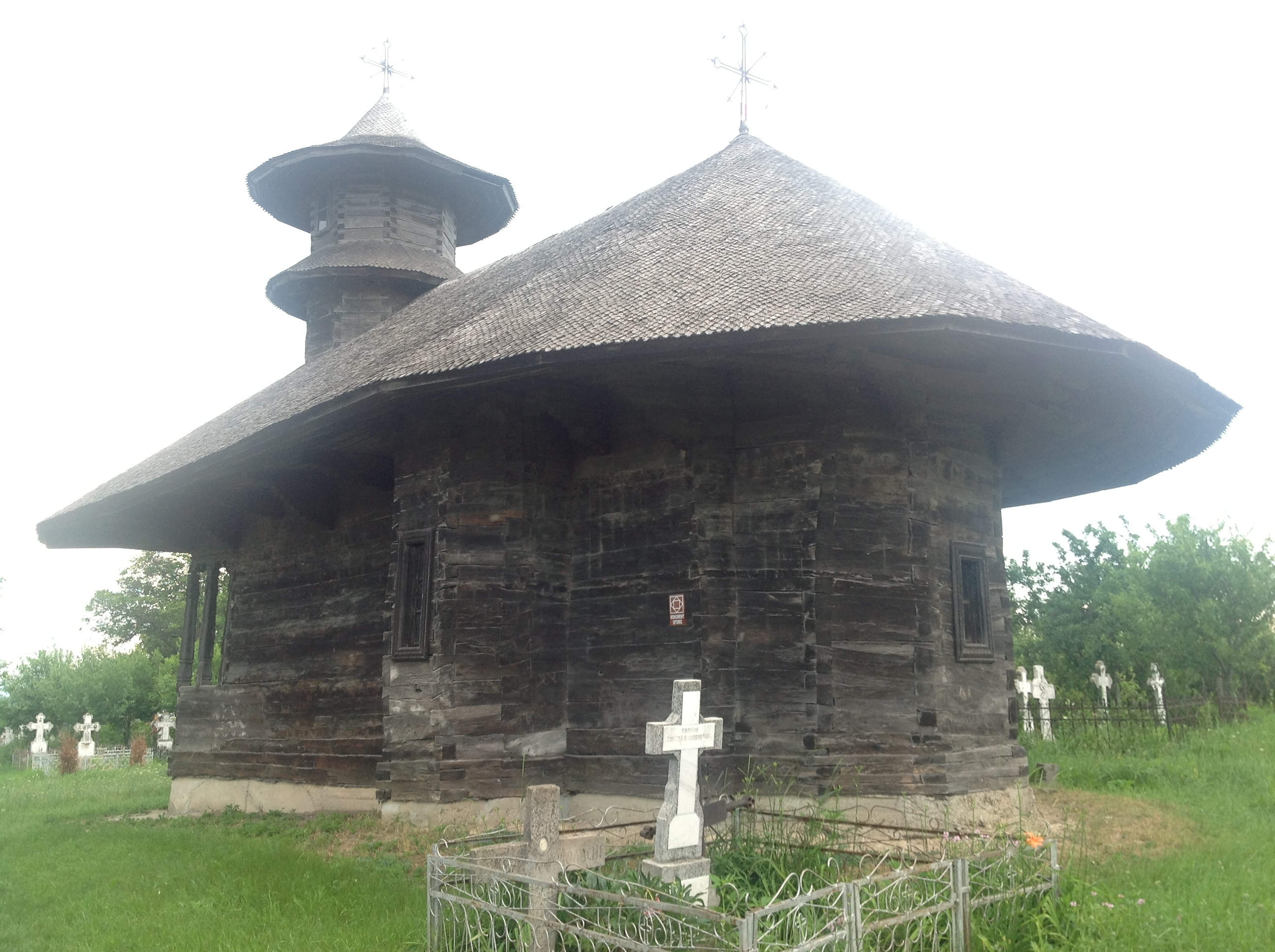
- St. Nicholas wooden church

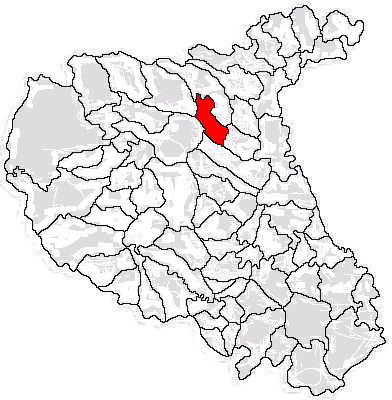
- Location in Vrancea County

- Location in Romania
- Coordinates: 45°56′N 27°3′E
- Country: Romania
- County: Vrancea

Government
  - Mayor (2024–2028): Vasile Zbîrciog (PSD)
- Area: 53 km^{2} (20 sq mi)
- Elevation: 326 m (1,070 ft)
- Population (2021-12-01): 3,435
  - Density: 65/km^{2} (170/sq mi)
- Time zone: UTC+02:00 (EET)
  - Summer (DST): UTC+03:00 (EEST)
- Postal code: 627325
- Area code: +(40) 237
- Vehicle reg.: VN
- Website: www.comunastraoane.ro

Străoane is a commune located in Vrancea County, Western Moldavia, Romania. It is composed of four villages: Muncelu, Repedea, Străoane, and Văleni.

== Demographics ==
As of 2021, the population was 3,435 inhabitants, with a population density of 64.16 inhabitants per square kilometer.

Historical population
Year	Pop.	±%
2002	4,023	—
2011	3,235	−19.6%
2021	3,435	+6.2%
Source: Census data

== Natives ==
- Gheorghe Alexianu (1897–1946), lawyer, governor of Transnistria between 1941 and 1944, convicted war criminal
- Ion Ciocârlan (1874–1942), prose writer
