= Gheorghe Alexianu =

Romanian politician (1897–1946)

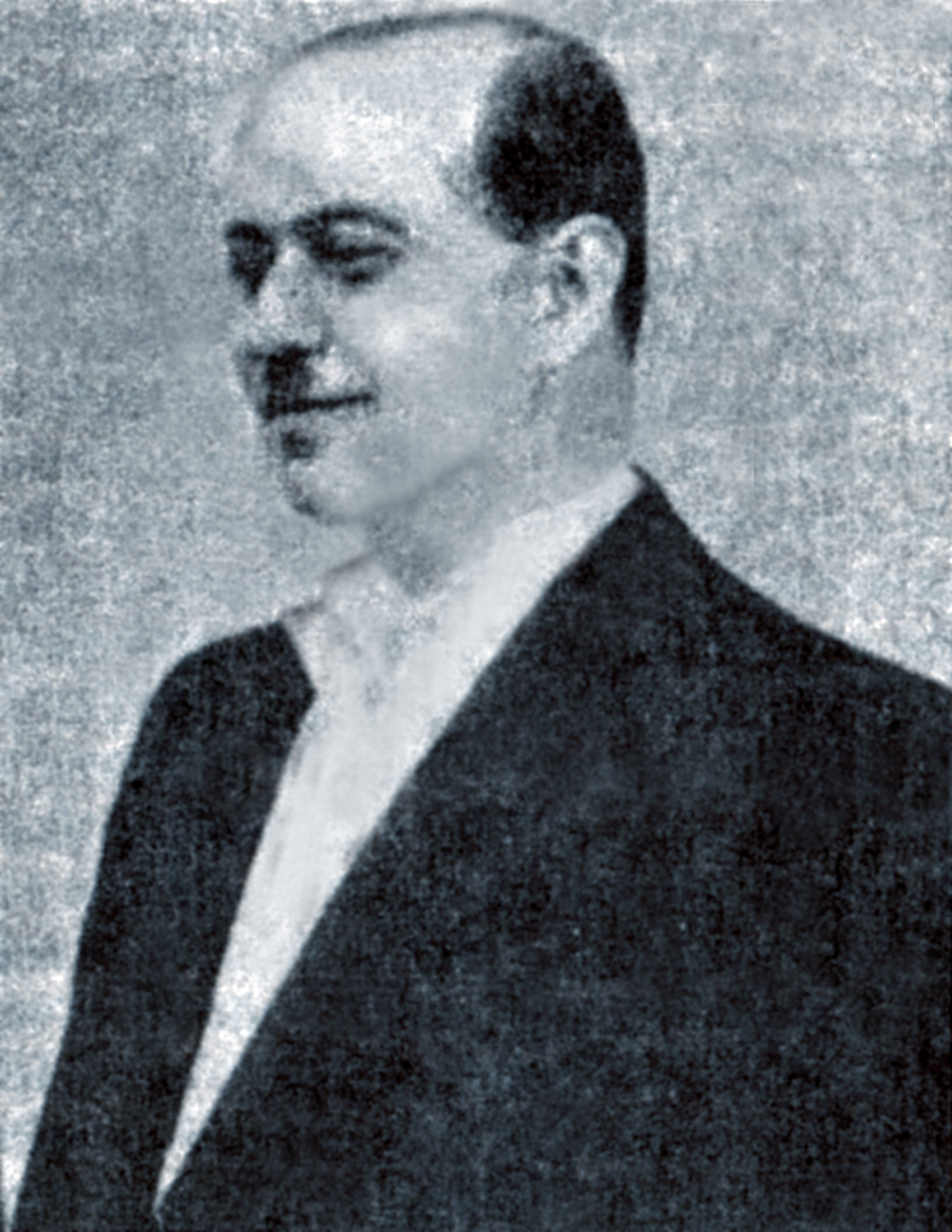

Governor of Transnistria
- In office 19 August 1941 – 26 January 1944
- Conducător: Ion Antonescu
- Preceded by: Office established
- Succeeded by: Gheorghe Potopeanu

Governor of Ținutul Bucegi
- In office 1 February 1939 – 6 September 1940
- Monarch: Carol II
- Preceded by: Alexandru N. Gane
- Succeeded by: Office abolished

Governor of Ținutul Suceava
- In office 29 August 1938 – 31 January 1939
- Monarch: Carol II
- Preceded by: Office established
- Succeeded by: Gheorghe Flondor

Personal details
- Born: 1 January 1897 Străoane, Putna County, Kingdom of Romania
- Died: 1 June 1946 (aged 49) Jilava Prison, Ilfov County, Kingdom of Romania
- Party: National Renaissance Front (1938–1940)
- Education: University of Bucharest
- Profession: Lawyer
- Known for: Odessa massacre

Military service
- Allegiance: Kingdom of Romania
- Branch: Romanian Army
- Years of service: 1916–1918
- Conflicts: World War I World War II
- Criminal information
- Status: Executed by firing squad
- Convictions: War crimes Crimes against peace Crimes against humanity
- Trial: Romanian People's Tribunals
- Penalty: Death

Details
- Victims: Ukrainian Jews

Gheorghe Alexianu (January 1, 1897 – 1 June 1946) was a Romanian lawyer, high school teacher and associate professor who served as governor of Transnistria between 1941 and 1944. In 1946, he was accused and convicted of war crimes, crimes against peace and crimes against humanity; he was sentenced to death by the Bucharest People's Tribunal (sentence reconfirmed in the appeals of 2006 and 2008), and was executed by firing squad on June 1, 1946.

== Biography ==
=== Professional and political career until 1940 ===
Gheorghe Alexianu was born in Străoane, Putna County; According to some sources, Gheorghe was the eldest son of a shepherd, supposedly Aromanian from the Pindus Mountains area, Ovanez Alexean, who had fled to Wallachia to escape the forced Islamization undertaken by the Turks in the second half of the 19th century. Ovanez arrived with his flocks of sheep in Moldova in the Panciu area, where he founded a household. The name Ovanez or Ovanes Alexan, however, more likely leads to an Armenian origin, Ovanes being the Armenian form of the name Ioan and there was, apparently, a confusion between the words "Aromanian" and "Armenian". The first mayor of the town of Panciu in 1864, the Armenian Anton Alexan, was related to Ovanes Alexan, the father of Gheorghe Alexianu.

In 1915 Alexianu began his law studies at the University of Bucharest. After Romania entered World War I, he enlisted voluntarily in the Romanian Army in December 1916. In 1918 he left the army and resumed his studies at the University of Bucharest. After graduation he was for a year professor of philosophy and history at a high school in Râmnicu Vâlcea. He then attended doctoral courses at the University of Bucharest and obtained the title of doctor in legal sciences in 1925. From 1927 he held the position of associate professor of public law at the University of Cernăuți, where he worked until 1938. He was one of the authors of the 1923 and 1938 Constitutions of Romania.

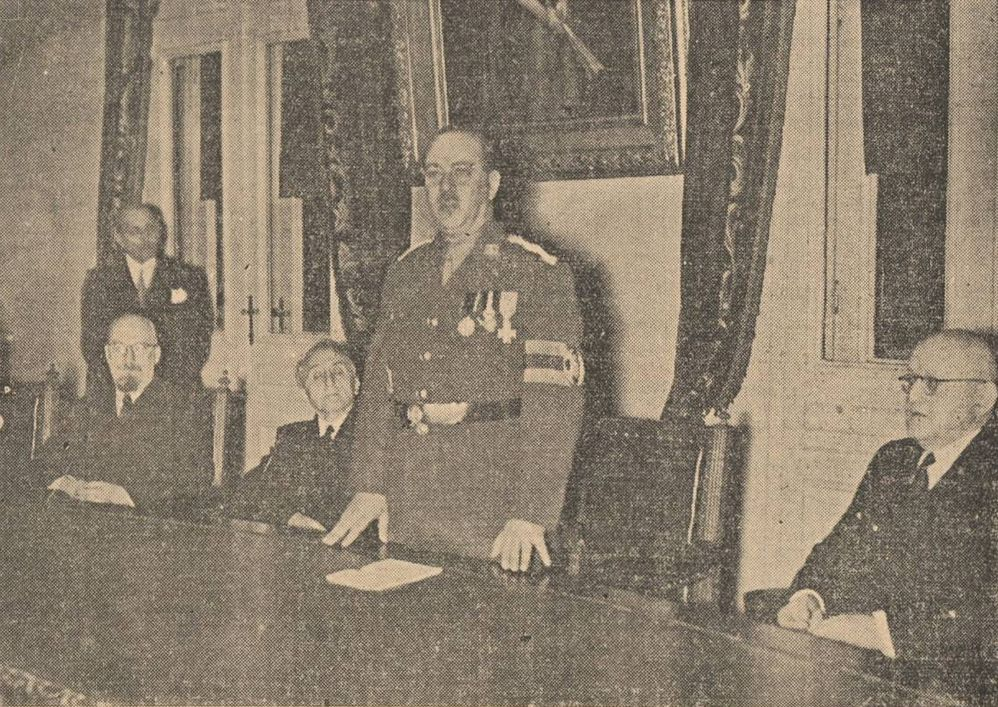
Alexianu in 1939, as royal resident of Ținutul Bucegi

Alexianu began his administrative career with his appointment as a governor (Romanian: "rezident regal", literally meaning "royal resident") of Ținutul Suceava (with the capital at Cernăuți) on August 29, 1938. On December 1, 1938, the decree-law no. 169/1938 for the "citizenship review", was issued by the Goga cabinet, with the aim of revoking the citizenship of Jewish citizens. Alexianu applied this decree-law abusively, with personal additions. Among other things, he ordered Jewish citizens, deprived of their Romanian citizenship, to register and also "suggested" that they should sell their properties and businesses within 14 days. On January 31, 1939, he was removed from the position of royal resident of Ținutul Suceava due to the inability to solve the social and political problems of Bukovina, and was replaced by Gheorghe Flondor. Alexianu was then appointed as a royal resident of Ținutul Bucegi (with the capital at Bucharest). He held this position until September 1940.

=== Transnistria Governorate ===
On June 19, 1941, Alexianu attended the meeting of the Antonescu Government when it was decided to declare war on the Soviet Union. On August 19, he was appointed by Ion Antonescu as governor of Transnistria. In this position, Alexianu was an "ex officio" member of the Council of Ministers.

Following a bomb attack launched on the evening of October 22, 1941 by Soviet partisans against the Romanian Army located in Odessa, Alexianu, as a government representative, ordered and supervised the retaliation and massacre of November 1941.

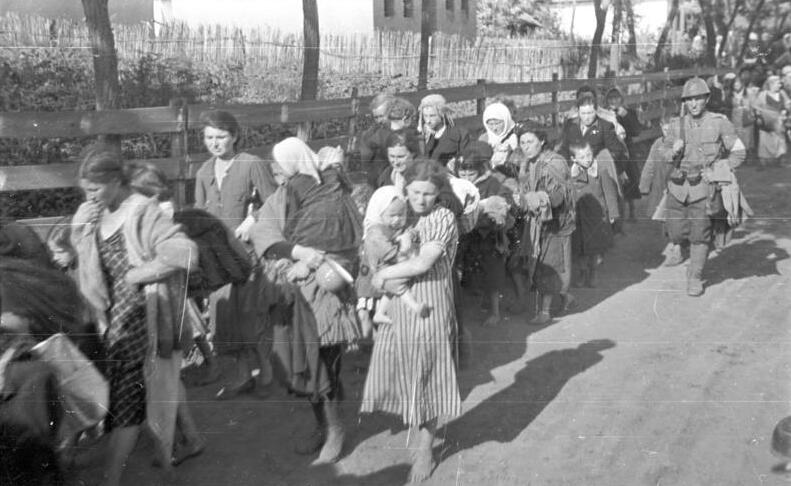
Romanian soldiers participating in the deportation of Jewish families (German photograph, July 1941)

As governor of Transnistria, Alexianu organized ghettos and concentration camps to place the deported Romanian and Ukrainian Jews and 25,000 Gypsies. He ordered endless marches in which Jews and Romas (including women, elders and even children) were forced to walk through the huge frozen steppes, leaving behind rows of corpses; he also enforced compulsory work for every "undesirable". By Ordinance no. 35 of January 2, 1942 Alexianu ordered the deportation of all Jews from Odessa to the Berezivka region, where they were massacred.

According to the historian Raul Hilberg, Antonescu's orders required German interventions: "There were situations in which the Germans would intervene to restrict and slowdown the Romanian measures. At that time, the Romanians were moving too fast for the German bureaucracy."

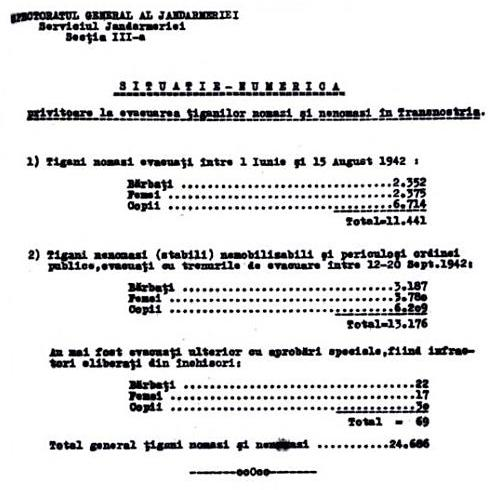
Gendarmerie Report: Deportation of Gypsies in Transnistria

About half of the 25,000 Roma deported to Transnistria were killed.

Alexianu administratively divided the occupied territories of Transnistria into counties, demanded the sending of a Romanian Orthodox Mission to this territory and re-established churches that have been previously transformed into grain depots or cattle stables by the soviet authorities. On December 7, 1941, on Alexianu's initiative, a university in Odessa was reorganized and reopened in place of the old University that had been evacuated to the east during the war by the Soviet authorities.

Although in Transnistria the majority population was Ukrainian, during Alexianu's administration, priority was given to Romanian schools. There were then 57 high schools (26 Romanian, 13 Ukrainian, 18 Russian), of which 34 practical high schools (5 Romanian, 13 Ukrainian, 16 Russian) and 23 theoretical-practical high schools (21 Romanian and two Russian).

On January 26, 1944, Alexianu was replaced as governor of Transnistria by General Gheorghe Potopeanu. On February 5, the new Odessa University awarded Alexianu the title of "doctor honoris causa", "as a gratitude of the support given to higher education in Odessa during his administration." On this occasion, the university assumed municipal positions and granted Alexianu a municipal title: "On behalf of the University of Odessa, we, the Faculty Council, unanimously declare you Honorary Citizen of Odessa".

=== 1946 trial ===
Alexianu was arrested in August 1944 and sent to Moscow alongside Ion Antonescu and Mihai Antonescu. He was given back to the Romanian authorities in April 1946. He was tried and convicted for war crimes, and was executed on June 1, 1946, at Jilava Prison.

The charges brought against Alexianu and the sentences proposed for each one of them were the following:

- campaigned for the complete entry of German troops into the country, through his participation in the Council of Ministers, from July 7, 1941, until January 26, 1944 – heavy detention for life and 10 years of civic degradation;
- participation in the declaration of war against USSR and supporting the continuation of the war against the USSR and the United Nations – the death penalty and 10 years of civilian degradation;
- ordering repressions against the civilian population of Odessa from the autumn of 1941 – the death penalty and 10 years of civic degradation;
- organization of forced labor work and transportation of people with the purpose of extermination – the death penalty and 10 years correctional ban;
- appropriation of private property in Transnistria – forced labor for life and 10 years of civic degradation;
- making illicit wealth – forced labor for life and 10 years of civic degradation;
- the organization of ghettos, concentration camps and deportations for reasons of political and racial persecution – heavy life imprisonment and 10 years of civic degradation;
- Ensuring the economic life of the country in the interest of Nazi Germany in support of the war against USSR – heavy life imprisonment and 10 years of civic degradation;
- non-compliance with international rules on war reduction – paid;
- subjecting inhuman treatment of prisoners of war – paid;
- crime used by art. 2 lit. is from Law 312/945 – paid.
