= Aurel Popovici =

Romanian politician (1863–1917)

Aurel Constantin Popovici
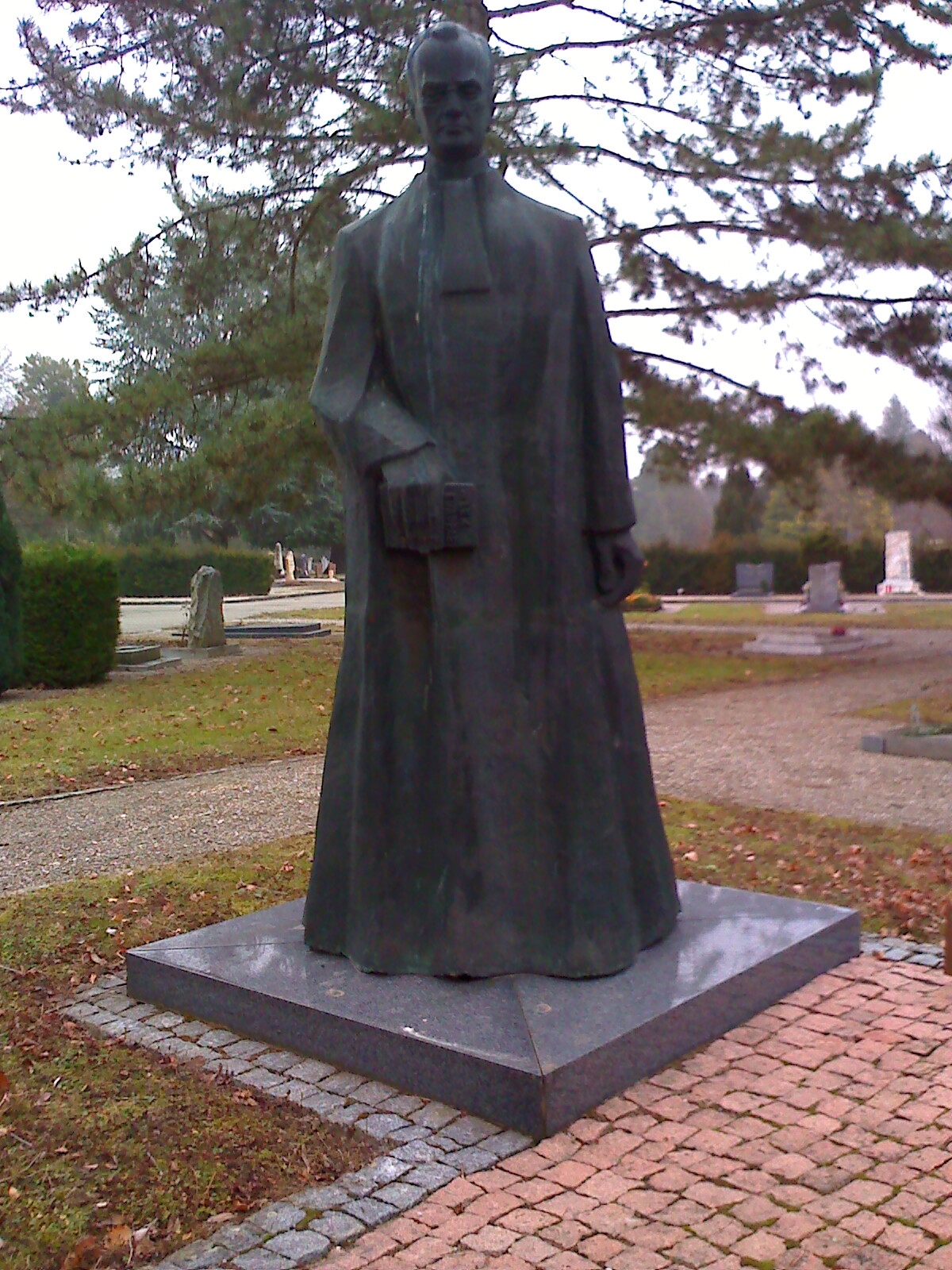
- Aurel Popovici's statue in Geneva
- Born: 16 October 1863; Lugos, Kingdom of Hungary, Austrian Empire (now Lugoj, Romania)
- Died: 9 February 1917 (aged 53); Geneva, Switzerland
- Resting place: St. Nicholas Church, Brașov, Romania
- Education: University of Graz
- Occupations: Lawyer, politician, journalist
- Known for: proposed federalization of Austria-Hungary

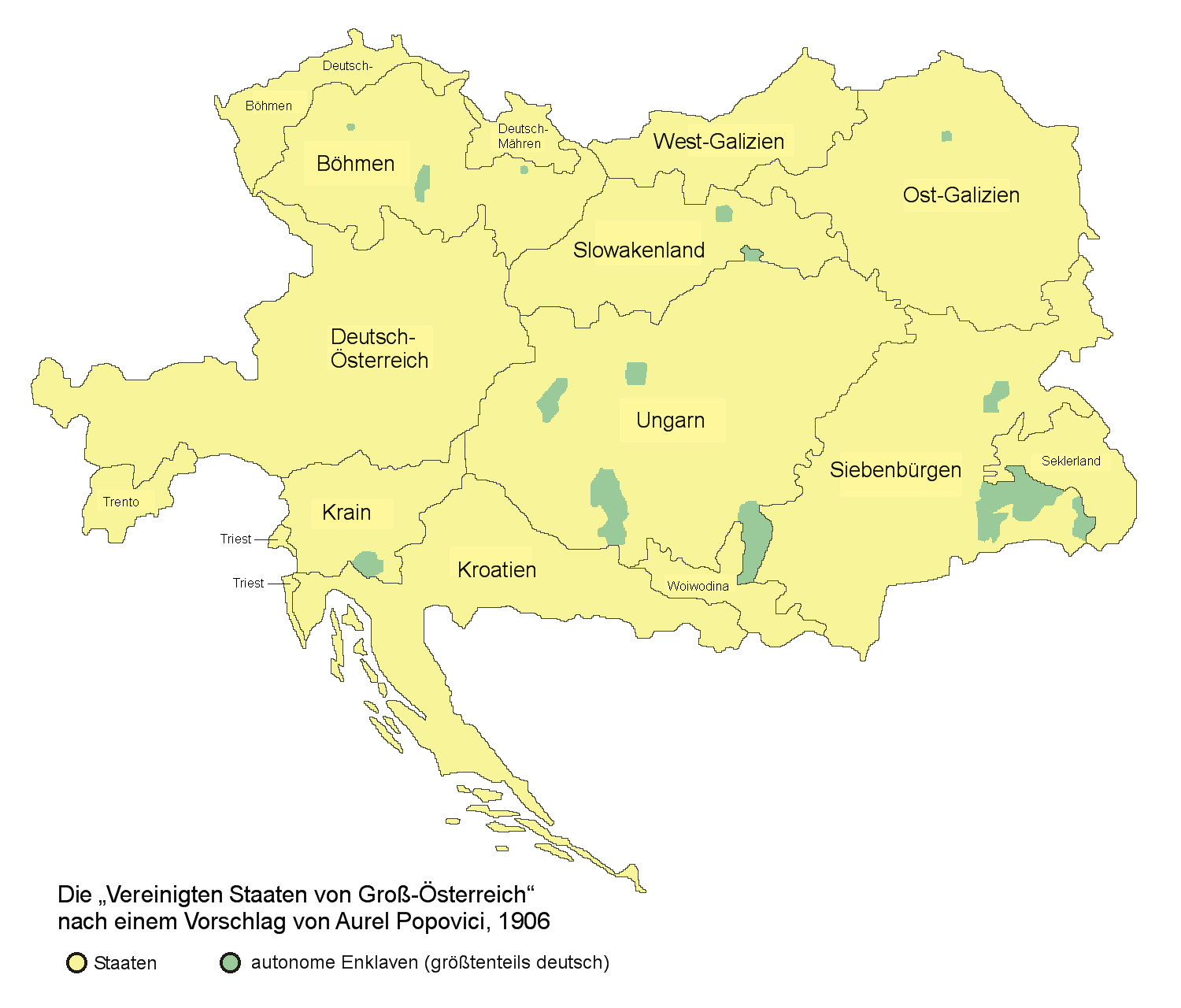
Map of the United States of Greater Austria, proposed by Popovici in 1906

Cover of Popovici's book, 1939 edition

Aurel Constantin Popovici (16 October 1863 – 9 February 1917) was an ethnic Romanian Austro-Hungarian lawyer and politician.

== Biography ==
He was born in Lugos, Kingdom of Hungary, Austrian Empire (today Lugoj, Romania). The son of an artisan, Constantin Popovici, and his wife Maria, he completed primary and secondary education and studied at the Hungarian Gymnasium in Lugoj (Lugos) (1873–1880), and then at the Romanian Lyceum in Beiuș (Belényes) (1880–1884). In 1885, he enrolled at the University of Vienna to study medicine and philosophy and later transferred to the University of Graz. In 1891, he became one of the leaders of the Romanian National Party and one of the editors of Tribuna. Together with other Romanian intellectuals of the Romanian National Party, in 1892 he signed the Transylvanian Memorandum, a document pleading for Romanians' equal rights with Hungarians in Transylvania, and demanding an end to persecutions and Magyarization attempts. In 1893, he moved to Austria, then to Italy and later Romania. In 1899, he founded the journal România Jună ("The Young Romania") in Bucharest.

In 1906, in his book, he proposed the federalization of the Austro-Hungarian monarchy into the so-called United States of Greater Austria. Between 1908 and 1909, he was the editor-in-chief and director of Romanian journal Sămănătorul ("The Sower") in Bucharest. In 1912, he settled in Vienna. After Romania's entrance into World War I in 1916, he moved to Geneva, Switzerland, and died there in 1917.

Popovici was buried in the cemetery next to St. Nicholas Church in Brașov (Brassó).

It was not until the 1980s that his work was subjected to scholarly analysis and historiographic assessments.

== Publications ==
- Popovici, Aurel C. (1892). Die rumänische Frage in Siebenbürgen und Ungarn (in German). Wien: Verlag der Hrsg. OCLC 252868067.
- Popovici, Aurel C. (1894). Cestiunea Naționalităților și modurile soluțiuniĭ sale în Ungaria (in Romanian). Sibiu. OCLC 1079106131.
- Popovici, Aurel C. (1906). Die Vereinigten Staaten von Gross-Österreich: politische Studien (in German). Leipzig. OCLC 174988463.
- Popovici, Aurel C. (1918). La Question roumaine en Transylvanie et en Hongrie (in French). Kiepert, Heinrich; Petresco-Comnène, Nicolas. Lausanne, Paris. OCLC 1063105103.

== See also ==
- United States of Greater Austria
- Oszkár Jászi
