= Zaharia Bârsan =

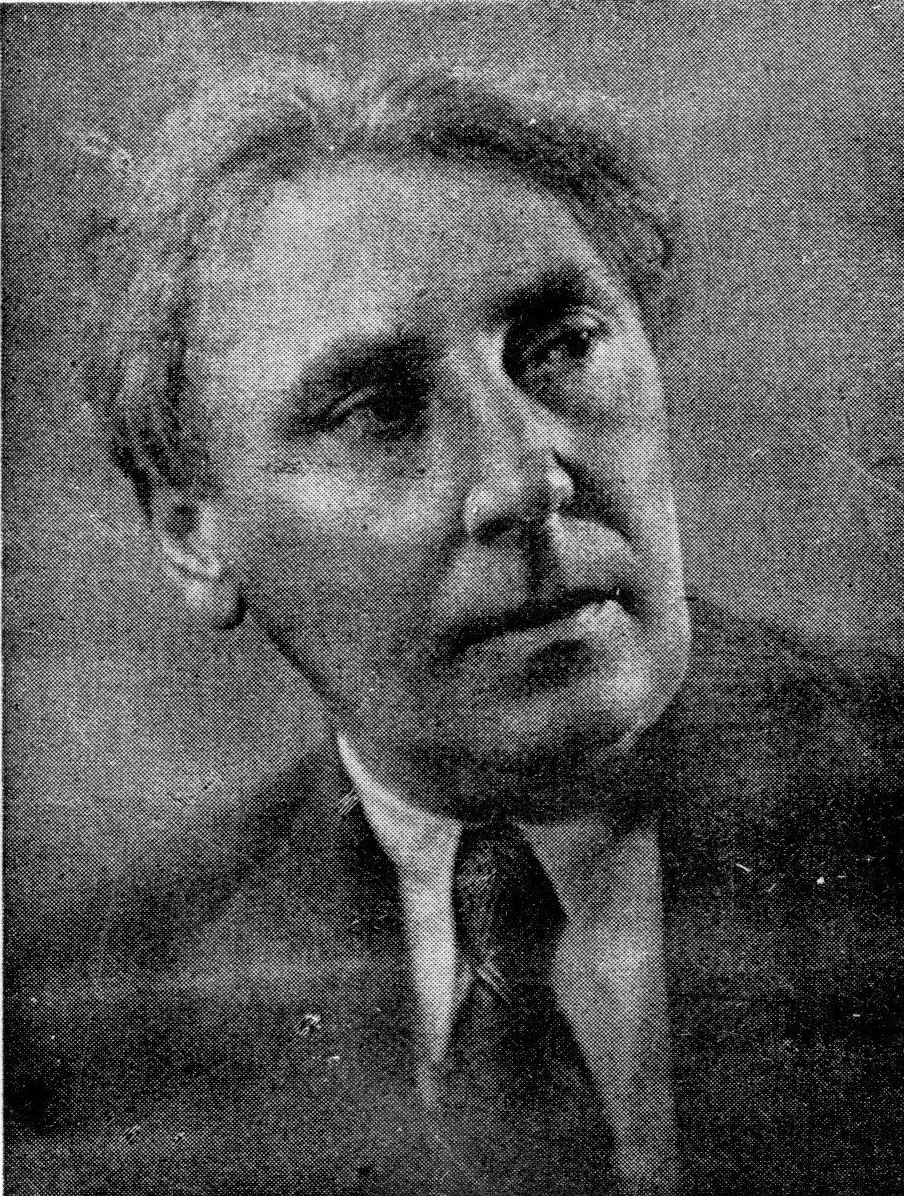
Zaharia Bârsan

Zaharia Bârsan (January 23 [O.S. January 11] 1878 – December 13, 1948) was an Austro-Hungarian-born Romanian playwright, poet and actor.

== Biography ==
He was born in Sânpetru, Brassó County, in what was then the Transylvania region of Austria-Hungary. His parents were Zaharie Bârsan, a small landowner, and his wife Maria (née Vlădăreanu).

After completing a gymnasium in his native city in 1895, Bârsan went to the Romanian Old Kingdom. Settling in its capital Bucharest, he earned a degree from Gheorghe Lazăr High School. He subsequently enrolled in the Dramatic Arts Conservatory, studying under Constantin Nottara and graduating in 1901.

An employee of the National Theatre Bucharest from that point, he also participated in numerous traveling shows; between 1903 and 1913, he was a central figure of theatrical life in Transylvania. Following the province's 1918 union with Romania, Bârsan became the first director of the Romanian-language Cluj National Theatre, serving from 1919 to 1927, from 1931 to 1933 and finally from 1934 to 1936. Using a romantic, incantatory style, he performed tragic roles that included Oedipus, Prince Hamlet, King Lear, Macbeth, Karl Moor, and Ruy Blas.

Bârsan's first published work consisted of verses that appeared in Convorbiri Literare in 1897. His poems, which had romantic and Sămănătorist elements, appeared in book form as Visuri de noroc (1903) and Poezii (1907; 1924). His prose books Ramuri (1906) and Nuvele (1909) display marked Sămănătorist tendencies. Bârsan's most influential writings were his plays: the melodrama Sirena, first performed in 1910, in which the destiny of a maladjusted artist meets that of a domestic lady of the camellias; the 1914 drama Se face ziuă, about the Revolt of Horea, Cloșca and Crișan; and the dramatic poems Trandafirii roșii (1915) and Domnul de rouă (1938). His 1908 memoir Impresii de teatru din Ardeal is important both for its literary style and its documentary value.
