= Ilarie Chendi =

Romanian literary critic (1871–1913)

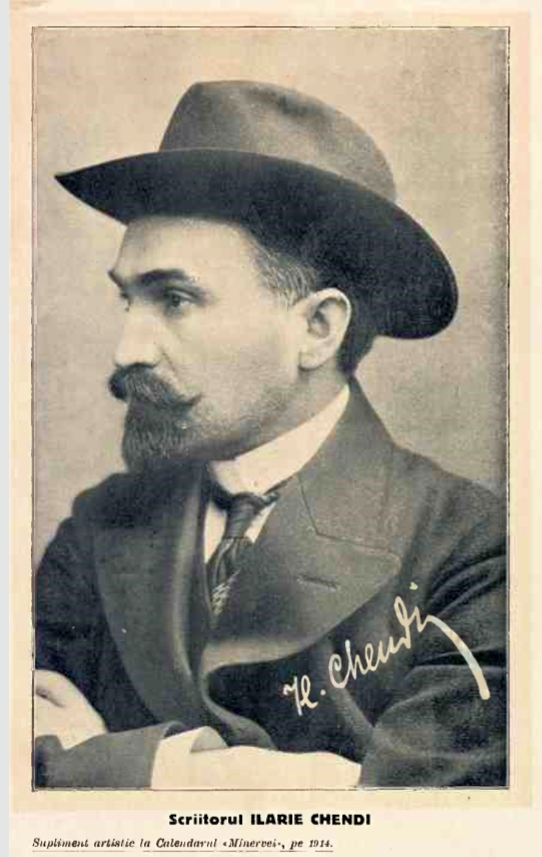
Portrait of Ilarie Chendi

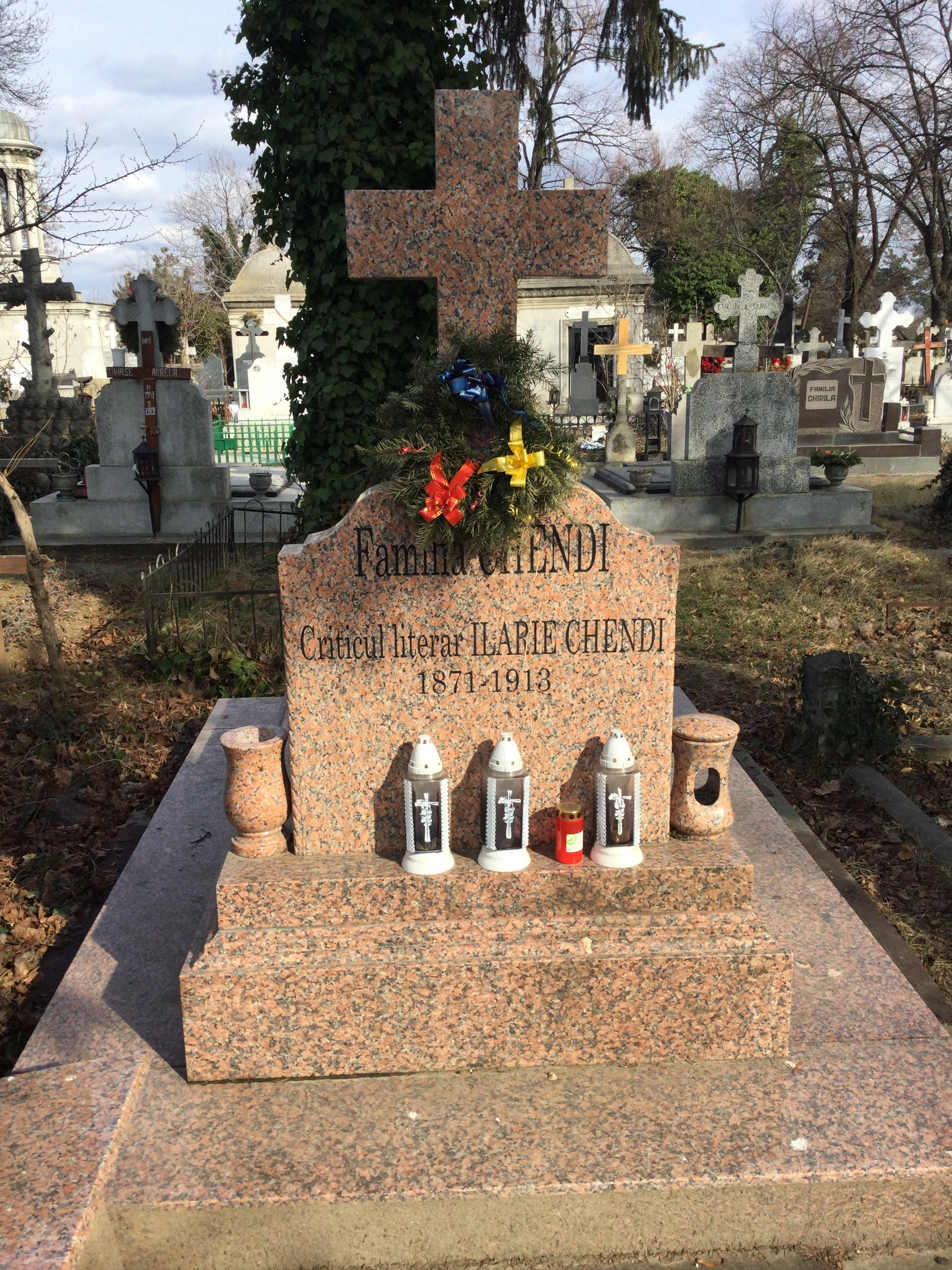
Grave at Bellu Cemetery

Ilarie Chendi (November 14, 1871 – June 23, 1913) was a Romanian literary critic.

Born in Darlac, Kis-Küküllő County, now Dârlos, Sibiu County, in Transylvania, his father Vasile was a Romanian Orthodox priest, while his mother Eliza (née Hodoș) was related to Alexandru Papiu Ilarian and Nerva Hodoș. His father's clerical family originated in Șaroṣ, while his mother's father was a priest in Band. In 1894, he graduated from the theological seminary in Sibiu and enrolled in the Literature faculty of the University of Budapest, which he left in 1898.

He made his prose-writing debut in 1893, and in 1898 settled in Bucharest, capital of the Romanian Old Kingdom. He published three volumes of critical columns, fragments and impressions over the course of three years (1903, 1904 and 1905), an unprecedented level of activity for a Romanian critic. Further works of impressions and literary biography followed in 1908 and 1911. For a time, he was aligned with the Sămănătorul circle of Nicolae Iorga, but broke with them in 1906. He then founded Viața literară, later Viața literară și artistică, a magazine that appeared over the course of the year 1907 and that he wrote almost in its entirety, sometimes under pseudonyms. Although still influenced by his former colleagues' ideas—Zigu Ornea labeled the publication "a dissident sămănătorist magazine"—he pursued a somewhat independent course, engaging in bitterly ironic polemics with Iorga. Chendi was among the founders of the Romanian Writers' Society. His intellectual ascendancy was ongoing when he committed suicide in 1913.

According to Nicolae Manolescu, he was Romania's first professional literary critic.
