= Luceafărul (magazine) =

Romanian magazine

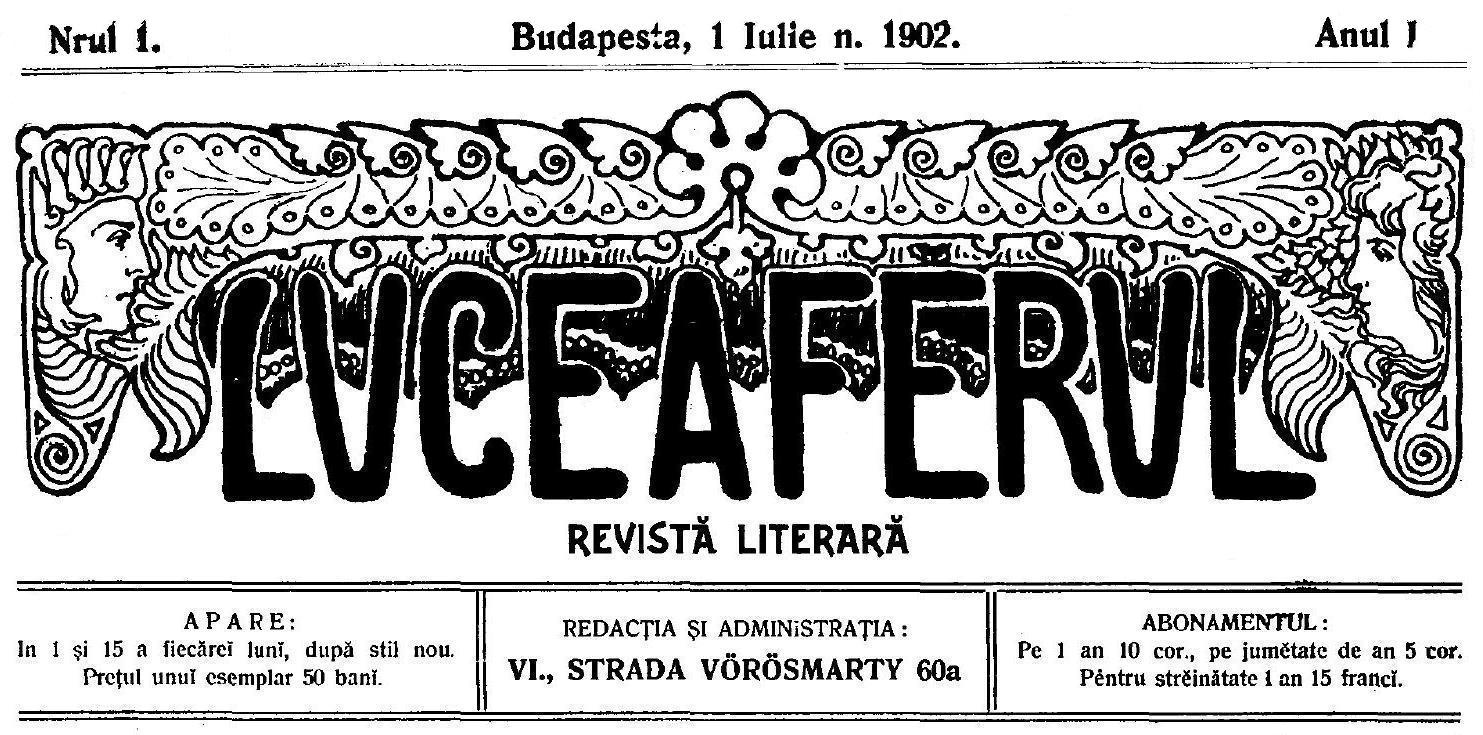
- Masthead for the first edition, 1 July 1902
- City: Budapest (1902–1906); Sibiu (1906–1914; 1934–1939); Bucharest (1919-1920; 1958–); Paris (1945–1949)

Luceafărul (Romanian popular name of the planet Venus) was a Romanian-language literary and cultural magazine that appeared in three series: 1902–1914 and 1919–1920; 1934–1939; and 1941–1945. Another magazine by this name has been published by the Writers' Union of Romania since 1958.

The magazine was first published in Budapest, Hungary, from 1902 to 1906. Octavian C. Tăslăuanu became the director of the magazine in 1904, and subsequently moved its publishing to Sibiu (then also in Hungary) from 1906 to 1914. The final issue in this format was published on 16 June 1914.

The magazine was briefly re-launched from Bucharest, Romania, and ran from January 1919 to April 1920. It returned to Sibiu, now within Romania's borders, from 1934 to 1939.

Following the Second World War, a magazine under the same title was edited by Mircea Eliade and Virgil Ierunca from France, aimed at members of the anti-communist Romanian exile.

Names associated with the first series include Alexandru Ciura, Octavian Goga, Ion Agârbiceanu, Horia Petra Petrescu, Octavian Codru Tăslăuanu, Ioan Lupaş, Aurel Paul Bănuţ and Zaharia Bârsan.
