= Adrian Păunescu =

Romanian poet and politician (1943–2010)

Adrian Păunescu OR
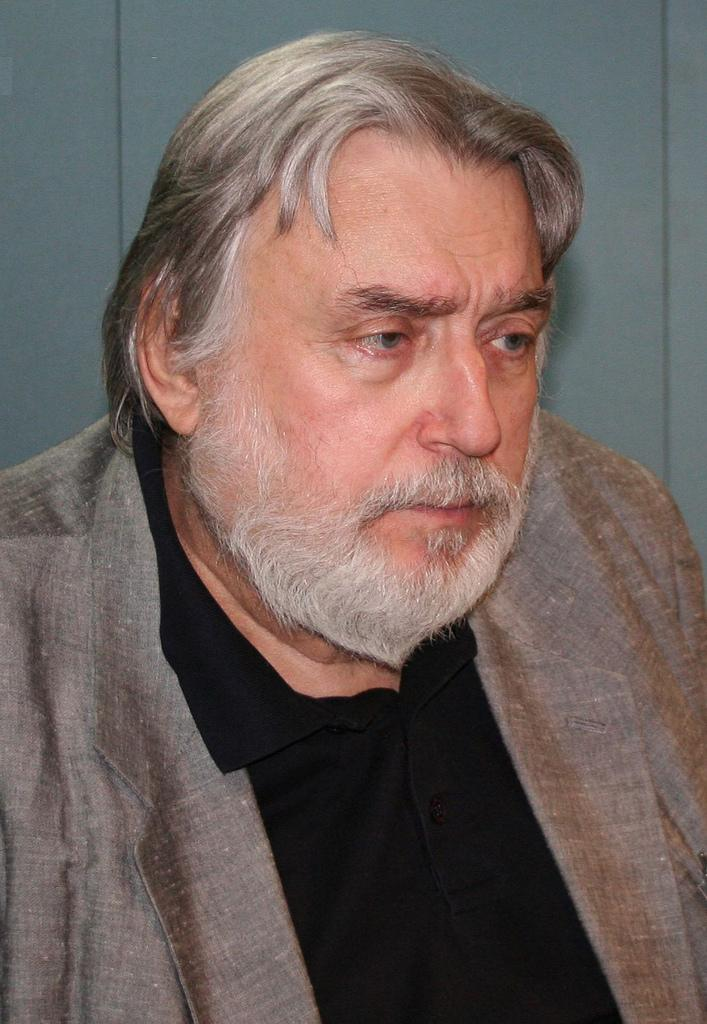
- Păunescu in 2009
- Born: 20 July 1943; Copăceni, Bălți County, Kingdom of Romania (now Republic of Moldova)
- Died: 5 November 2010 (aged 67); Bucharest, Romania
- Resting place: Bellu Cemetery
- Education: University of Bucharest
- Occupations: Poet, politician, journalist
- Spouses: Constanța Buzea (m. 1961–1976) Carmen Păunescu (b. Antal) (m. 1990)
- Writing career
- Language: Romanian
- Period: 1960–2010
- Notable works: Ultrasentimente (1965), Flacăra magazine

Adrian Păunescu (Romanian pronunciation: [adriˈan pə.uˈnesku]; 20 July 1943 – 5 November 2010) was a Romanian writer, publisher, cultural promoter, translator, and politician. A profoundly charismatic personality, a controversial and complex figure, the artist and the man are almost impossible to separate. On the one hand he stands accused of collaboration with the Communist regime, but on the other hand he was persecuted and ostracised by the regime when he started to confront its failures, and when his influence started to be considered dangerous.

Păunescu was called "Romania's most famous poet" in an Associated Press story, quoted by The New York Times.

== Life ==
Born in Copăceni, Bălți County, in what is now the Republic of Moldova, Păunescu spent his childhood in Bârca, Dolj County. He started his secondary studies at the Frații Buzești High School in Craiova and then continued at Saint Sava High School in Bucharest.

Păunescu studied philology at the University of Bucharest and became a writer and journalist. He was an influential public figure for Romanian youth throughout the 1970s and early 1980s. Though he was criticised for writing flattering poems about Nicolae Ceaușescu, Păunescu remained popular in Romania, where he appeared on television several times a week.

As posthumously summarized by newspaper România Liberă, Păunescu "is still viewed as a hero by the man in the street" although "intellectuals continue to question his integrity and the literary value of his work".

== Flacăra and Cenaclul Flacăra ==
A member of the Union of Communist Youth between 1966 and 1968, and, between 1968 and 1989, of the Romanian Communist Party, Păunescu gained control over a major weekly publication, Flacăra and became the producer and host of an immensely popular itinerant series of cultural events in the country, Cenaclul Flacăra, founded in 1973 and ended by the Communist authorities in 1985. The events included folk and pop music, poetry recitals, and Păunescu's personal and often rousing speeches. Through this cultural forum, Păunescu promoted Romanian poetry and music, instilling a nationalistic tone calling for pride in Romanian spiritual-artistic values and expression, seemingly as a counterpoint to the "puerile and pernicious" pop music (both Romanian and foreign) available on radio stations. Poets promoted included canonical names of Romanian literature: Mihai Eminescu, Lucian Blaga, Octavian Goga, George Bacovia, Nichita Stănescu, Ana Blandiana. Păunescu's own poems, recited at these events, have a social theme, about the life and difficulties of ordinary people. They remain very popular decades after, many Romanians being able to recite parts of them from memory. The performers were a mix of professional artists as well as talented amateurs vetted by Păunescu himself. Many of these "novices" have become famous performers, household names — for example, Nicu Alifantis, Adrian Ivanițchi, Marcela Saftiuc, Mădălina Amon, Ștefan Hrușcă, Mircea Baniciu, Mircea Vintilă, Tatiana Stepa, and many others. At the height of its popularity, the events were gathering tens of thousands of young people, filling stadiums.

== Poetry ==
As with the man, Adrian Păunescu's poetry is difficult to define or pigeonhole easily. On debut he writes in a modernist and mythological tone - reinterpreting old myths couched within abstract contemporary rhetoric. In this phase he also writes "pure poetry", similar to his illustrious contemporary Nichita Stănescu, although most people and literary critics mostly remember the later Păunescu poetry, the one moving to a Messianic tone, where his verses were sung and recited by thousands of young people in stadiums. Regarding the later, singer and song-writer Daniel Reynaud, who occasionally performs (Australia, USA) songs on verses of Păunescu translated in English, expressed the opinion that Against War (Antirăzboinica - Verses Adrian Păunescu, music Valeriu Sterian, translation Daniel Ioniță) is on par with any anti war poem or song Bob Dylan, or anyone, might have written.

According to literary critic Nicolae Manolescu, Adrian Păunescu is both loved and loathed, authentic and false, capable of sublime poetry as well as mediocre slogans. He certainly irritates, be it by default or design: "I hate everything about this poet, apart from his poetry..." (Eugen Barbu). Păunescu is capable of large and swift movements of emotion and expression in his poetry, where loud posing can be followed by delicate doubt, and a pamphlet by a hymn. "A devilish body with an angel's soul". Literary historian and critic Alex Ștefănescu is of the opinion that if professionally anthologised, liberated from its weaker parts, Adrian Păunescu's poetry could be on par with the best of what Romanian poetry has to offer.

== Political career ==
After the Romanian Revolution of 1989, Păunescu pursued a political career, aligning himself with socialism and then social-democratic political parties.

In 1996, he ran in that year's Romanian presidential election but received only 87,163 votes (0.69%). He was a senator from 1992 to 2008, representing Dolj County (1992–2004) and then Hunedoara County (2004–2008), initially representing the Socialist Labour Party (PSM), and later the Social Democratic Party of Romania (PSD). He received the most votes in his district at the 2008 election, but failed to win a seat after the votes were redistributed pursuant to the MMP system used.

== Death and legacy ==
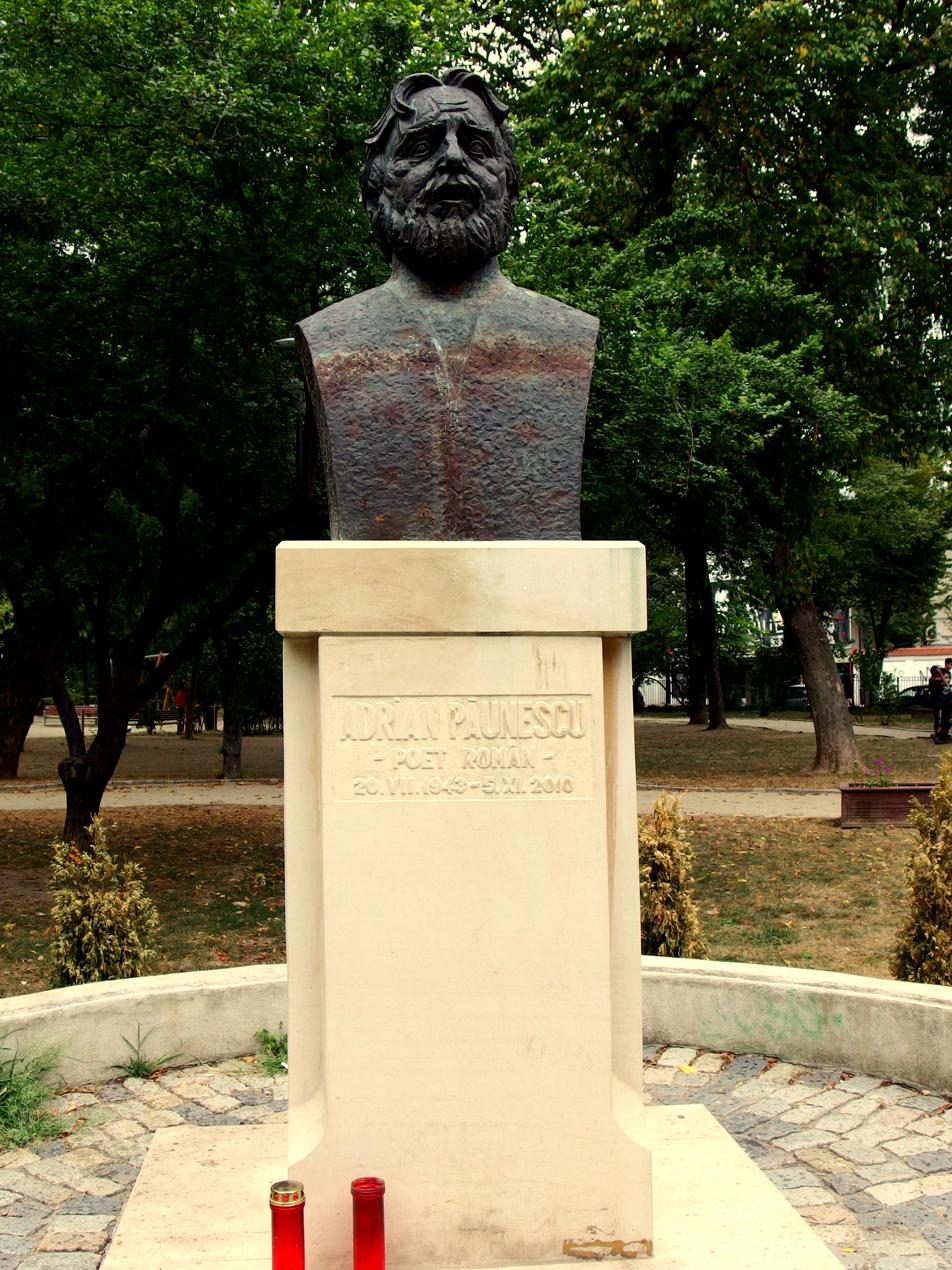
Bust of Păunescu at Grădina Icoanei in Bucharest

At aged 67, Păunescu was hospitalized on 26 October 2010 in the intensive care unit of the Floreasca Emergency Hospital in Bucharest, with problems of more vital organs caused by pulmonary edema. Păunescu had subsequent renal, liver, and heart failure. He was declared dead at 7:15 AM, on 5 November 2010. Survived by his wife and three children, Păunescu was posthumously thanked by Romania's president Traian Băsescu, who in saluting him mentioned only his contributions to art.

In May 2012 a bronze bust of Păunescu, made by sculptors Ioan Deac-Bistrița and Dragoș Neagoe, was inaugurated at Grădina Icoanei, in central Bucharest.

== Books ==
- Ultrasentimente (1965)
- Mieii primi (1966)
- Fântâna somnambulă (1968)
- Cărțile poștale ale morții (1970)
- Aventurile extraordinare ale lui Hap și Pap (1970)
- Viața de excepții (1971)
- Sub semnul întrebării (1971)
- Istoria unei secunde (1971)
- Lumea ca lume (1973)
- Repetabila povară (1974)
- Pământul deocamdată (1976)
- Poezii de până azi (1978)
- Sub semnul întrebării (1979)
- Manifest pentru sănătatea pământului (1980)
- Iubiți-vă pe tunuri (1981)
- De la Bârca la Viena și înapoi (1981)
- Rezervația de zimbri (1982)
- Totuși iubirea (1983)
- Manifest pentru mileniul trei (1984)
- Manifest pentru mileniul trei (1986)
- Locuri comune (1986)
- Viața mea e un roman (1987)
- Într-adevăr (1988)
- Sunt un om liber (1989)
- Poezii cenzurate (1990)
- Romaniada (1993–1994)
- Bieți lampagii (1993–1994)
- Noaptea marii beții (1993–1994)
- Front fără învingători (1995)
- Infracțiunea de a fi (1996)
- Tragedia națională (1997)
- Deromânizarea României (1998)
- Cartea Cărților de Poezie (1999)
- Meserie mizarabilă, sufletul (2000)
- Măștile însîngerate (2001)
- Nemuritor la zidul morții (2001)
- Până la capăt (2002)
- Liber să sufăr (2003)
- Din doi în doi (2003)
- Eminamente (2003)
- Cartea Cărților de Poezie (2003)
- Logica avalanșei (2005)
- Antiprimăvara (2005)
- Ninsoarea de adio (2005)
- Un om pe niște scări (2006)
- De mamă și de foaie verde (2006)
- Copaci fără pădure (2006)
- Vagabonzi pe plaiul mioritic (2007)
- Rugă pentru părinți (2007)
- Încă viu (2008)
- Libertatea de unică folosință (2009)

== Presence in English language anthologies ==
- Testament – 400 Years of Romanian Poetry – 400 de ani de poezie românească – bilingual edition – Daniel Ioniță (editor and principal translator) with Daniel Reynaud, Adriana Paul & Eva Foster – Editura Minerva, 2019. ISBN 978-973-21-1070-6
- Romanian Poetry from its Origins to the Present – bilingual edition English/Romanian – Daniel Ioniță (editor and principal translator) with Daniel Reynaud, Adriana Paul, and Eva Foster – Australian–Romanian Academy Publishing, 2020. ISBN 978-0-9953502-8-1; OCLC 1288167046
- Testament – Anthology of Romanian Verse – American Edition – monolingual English edition – Daniel Ioniță (editor and translator), with Eva Foster, Daniel Reynaud, and Rochelle Bews – Australian–Romanian Academy for Culture, 2017. ISBN 978-0-9953502-0-5
- The Bessarabia of my Soul / Basarabia Sufletului meu – a collection of poetry from the Republic of Moldova – bilingual English & Romanian – Daniel Ioniță and Maria Tonu (editors), with Eva Foster, Daniel Reynaud, and Rochelle Bews – MediaTon, Toronto, Canada, 2018. ISBN 978-1-7751837-9-2

== Electoral history ==
=== Presidential elections ===
Election	Affiliation	First round			Second round		
Election	Affiliation	Votes	Percentage	Position	Votes	Percentage	Position
1996	PSM	87,163	0.7%	9th			
