= Mircea Dinescu =

Romanian poet, journalist and editor (born 1950)

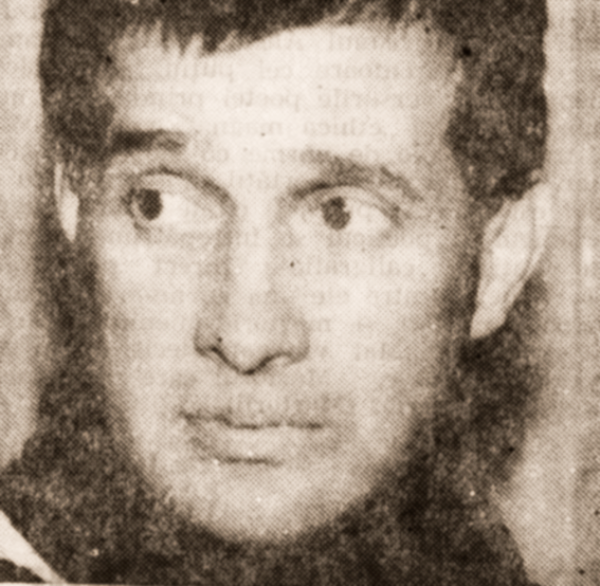
- Dinescu in 1990
- Born: November 11, 1950 (age 75); Slobozia, Ialomița County, Romania
- Education: Ștefan Gheorghiu Academy
- Occupations: Poet, journalist, editor
- Parent(s): Ștefan Dinescu, Aurelia (née Badea)

Mircea Dinescu (Romanian pronunciation: [ˈmirtʃe̯a diˈnesku]; born November 11, 1950) is a Romanian poet, journalist, and editor.

== Biography ==
=== Early life and poetry ===
He was born in Slobozia, the son of Ștefan Dinescu, a metalworker, and Aurelia (born Badea). Dinescu studied at the Faculty of Journalism of the Ștefan Gheorghiu Academy, and was considered a gifted young poet during his youth, with several poetry volumes published.

=== Dissidency ===
In August 1988, Dinescu was invited by the Union of Soviet Writers in the Soviet Union and on August 25, he gave an interview to the Romanian section of the Voice of Russia. During the interview, he expressed his support for the Glasnost and Perestroika policies of the Soviet Union.

After returning to Bucharest, he invited some friends (including Gabriel Liiceanu, Alexandru Paleologu, and Andrei Pleșu) to write a protest against Ceaușescu's policies that were destroying Romanian culture and villages, but they failed to reach a consensus on the text and Dinescu decided to write his own protest. The members of the group were then visited by the Securitate, which argued that their actions were done under KGB orders as an attack against Romania, not against Ceaușescu.

His book, Moartea citește ziarul ("Death is reading the newspaper") was turned down in 1988 by the Communist regime's censorship apparatus, and was then published in Amsterdam.

On March 17, 1989, he was fired from România Literară literary magazine, as a result of an anti-totalitarian interview against President Nicolae Ceaușescu, which Dinescu had granted to the French newspaper Libération in December 1988. According to him, the reason for dismissal was "receiving visits from diplomats and journalists from Socialist and capitalist countries without permission". He was expelled from the Romanian Communist Party (PCR), held under house arrest, with his house guarded around the clock, all visits banned; he was allowed to go outside just for shopping, but always flanked by two Securitate officers.

Dinescu got support from seven writers (Geo Bogza, Ștefan Augustin Doinaș, Dan Hăulică, Octavian Paler, Andrei Pleșu, Alexandru Paleologu, and Mihai Șora), who wrote a letter to Dumitru Radu Popescu, the President of the Writers' Union, asking him "to undo an injustice". Despite the original authors' secrecy (they didn't publish it abroad), six of them (all, except for Geo Bogza, a veteran socialist) were forbidden to publish. He got additional support from poet Doina Cornea, literary critics Alexandru Călinescu and Radu Enescu, and, in November 1989, a collective of 18 young academics and writers, who also wrote letters to Popescu.

Despite being isolated, Dinescu noticed that with a handful of exceptions, the writers did not protest against the oppression of the regime. On November 11, he wrote a statement in which he attacked the Romanian intelligentsia for their sycophancy for Ceaușescu, the Romanian Orthodox Church for being "trade unionists in religious vestments", journalists for being 'apostles of the personality cult", and writers for being "trusted handmaidens of the party".

=== Revolution ===
In December 1989 he had a preeminent role in the Romanian Revolution, taking part in the occupation of the National Television building by the people of Bucharest. According to popular rumors, his fellow revolutionary Ion Caramitru, unaware that he was being filmed, said to Dinescu something that was taken to be "Mircea, fă-te că lucrezi!" ("Mircea, pretend you are working!"); this was to be proof that the Revolution was a carefully staged front for a coup d'état. According to the investigation of Alex Mihai Stoenescu, Caramitru actually said "Mircea, arată că lucrezi" ("Mircea, show that you're working [on something]" – while holding Dinescu's booklet in front of camera), to which Dinescu replied "La un apel" ("[I'm working] on an appeal [to the people]") – which was indicative of their ill-preparedness and preoccupation in quickly drafting a single revolutionary proclamation on the spot.

=== Journalist after 1989 ===
After the fall of Communism, he co-founded Academia Cațavencu, the most famous Romanian satirical magazine. He quit the publication in 1998 and went on founding his own publications, Plai cu Boi (loosely translated as "Land of the Dumb") – a satirical Playboy-style magazine and Aspirina Săracului (The Poor Man's Aspirin – a humorous reference to sexual intercourse) – a weekly satirical magazine.

He invested a part of the money he earned from the books published into agriculture. His estate makes a wine sold under the name Vinul Moșierului ("Landlord's wine") – the name is a tongue-in-cheek reference to an ironic comment President Ion Iliescu had made about Dinescu's social status.

Dinescu remains a strong voice of the civil society. As member of Consiliul Național pentru Studierea Arhivelor Securității (National Council for the Study of the Securitate Archives), he is particularly concerned with exposing the former officers and collaborators of the Securitate. He is also a strong critic of Communism and of Romanian leaders that had connections with the Communist regime.

Although not politically involved, he openly supported Traian Băsescu's candidature for President of Romania during the 2004 elections.

In May 2005, in collaboration with the journalist Cristian Tudor Popescu, he started a new newspaper called Gândul, with an initial circulation of 100,000 copies, but he sold his shares in July 2006. He and Stelian Tănase host a talk show on Realitatea TV, Tănase și Dinescu.

Dinescu was appointed a Commander of the Order of the Star of Romania. In 1991, he became an Honorary Member of the University of Augsburg.

== Presence in English language anthologies ==
- Testament - Anthology of Romanian Verse - American Edition - monolingual English language edition - Daniel Ioniță (editor and principal translator) with Eva Foster, Daniel Reynaud and Rochelle Bews - Australian-Romanian Academy for Culture - 2017 - ISBN 978-0-9953502-0-5
- Born in Utopia - An anthology of Modern and Contemporary Romanian Poetry - Carmen Firan and Paul Doru Mugur (editors) with Edward Foster - Talisman House Publishers - 2006 - ISBN 1-58498-050-8
- From the Republic of Conscience - An International Anthology of Poetry - Kerry Flattley and Chris Wallace-Crabbe (editors) with Edward Foster - White Pine Press - 1993 - ISBN 1-877727-26-1
- 2019 -Testament - 400 Years of Romanian Poetry/400 de ani de poezie românească - Minerva Publishing 2019 - Daniel Ioniță (editor and principal translator) assisted by Daniel Reynaud, Adriana Paul and Eva Foster. ISBN 978-973-21-1070-6
- 2020 - Romanian Poetry from its Origins to the Present - bilingual edition - Daniel Ioniță (editor and principal translator) with Daniel Reynaud, Adriana Paul and Eva Foster - Australian-Romanian Academy Publishing - 2020 - ISBN 978-0-9953502-8-1 ; OCLC 1288167046
