= Nina Cassian =

Romanian writer

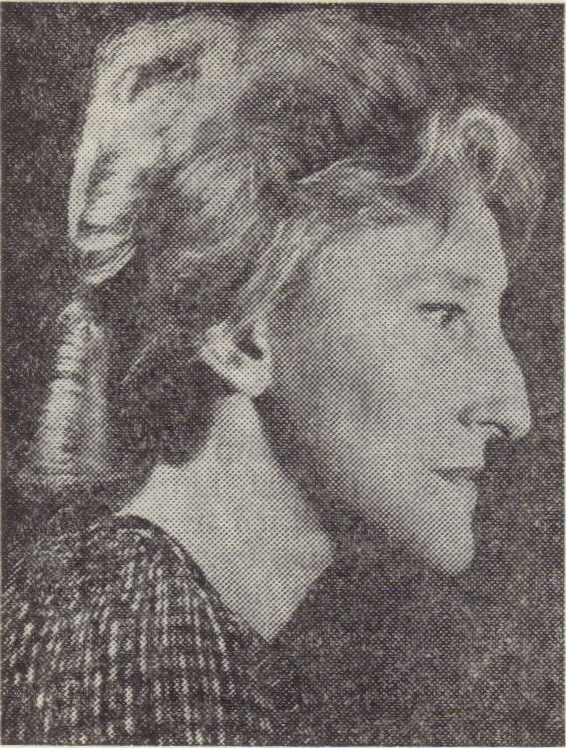
- Cassian c. 1978
- Born: Renée Annie Cassian-Mătăsaru; 27 November 1924; Galați, Kingdom of Romania
- Died: 14 April 2014 (aged 89); New York City, United States
- Occupations: Writer; poet; journalist; translator; film critic
- Spouse(s): Vladimir Colin (1943–1948); Al. I. Ștefănescu; Maurice Edwards

Nina Cassian (pen name of Renée Annie Cassian-Mătăsaru; 27 November 1924, in Galați – 14 April 2014, in New York City) was a Romanian poet, children's book writer, translator, journalist, accomplished pianist and composer, and film critic. She spent the first sixty years of her life in Romania until she moved to the United States in 1985 for a teaching job. A few years later Cassian was granted permanent asylum and New York City became her home for the rest of her life. Much of her work was published both in Romanian and in English.

== Life and work ==
=== Early life ===
Nina Cassian was born into a Jewish family in Galați in 1924, the only child of Iosif Cassian-Mătăsaru, a translator, and an amateur singer. In 1926 the family moved to Brașov. Cassian's fascination with languages is said to date back to that time of her childhood since this is when she started spending time with children from the German and Hungarian community. In 1935, the family moved to Bucharest, where Cassian attended a girl's high school in the Jewish neighborhood.

Over the years she took drawing lessons with George Loewendal and M. H. Maxy, acting lessons with Beate Fredanov and Alexandru Finți, piano and musical composition lessons with Theodor Fuchs, Paul Jelescu, Mihail Jora, and Constantin Silvestri.

She frequented left-wing intellectual circles and joined the Union of Communist Youth at age 16. In 1944 she entered the Literature Department of the University of Bucharest, but abandoned her studies after one year.

=== Life in Communist Romania ===
In the mid-40s Cassian started to find her place in the literary scene in Romania. She was married to the young poet Vladimir Colin in 1943 (their marriage lasted until 1948) and had a very close relation with Ion Barbu. One of Barbu's poems, Ut algebra poesis ("As Algebra, So Poetry"), was written for her in 1946. Most interestingly though, Cassian also formed a very close friendship with the famous poet Paul Celan during the time he lived in Bucharest (1945–1947). Along with other writers and artists, Celan and Cassian played surrealist games such as "Questions and Answers" or "Ioachim", which is the Bucharest version of André Breton's famous game, Exquisite corpse. Cassian and Celan bonded over their fascination for languages and used multilingualism as an inspiration for their work.

In 1945 Cassian published her first poem, Am fost un poet decadent ("I Used to Be a Decadent Poet") in the daily România Liberă, and her first poetry collection, La scara 1/1 ("Scale 1:1") in 1947. These early publications were greatly influenced by French modernist poets she had spent time with, especially the surrealist writers are said to have had a lasting influence on Cassian. It was labeled "decadent poetry" in a Scînteia article in 1948. Scared by that fierce criticism, she then turned to writing in the proletkult and socialist-realistic fashion. This phase lasted for about eight years.

This is also when Cassian turned to writing children's books, such as Copper Red and the Seven Dachsies (which was published in English in 1985 after it had become a bestseller in Romania), and children's stories, such as Tigrino and Tigrene (which was written in verse and published in English in 1986, adapted from the Romanian original Povestea a doi pui de tigru, numiţi Ninigra şi Aligru). In an interview in 1986, she explains why she made the choice to focus on children's literature: "It was in 1950, during the dogmatic period in Romania. Socialist realism is, unfortunately, characterized by the restraining of structures and styles and vocabulary. [...] So when I was asked to write in a rigid and simplified manner, I tried to do my best, but after awhile, I switched to literature for children because it was the only field where metaphors were still allowed, where imagination was tolerated and assonance was permitted." At least some of her children's stories and books have been translated to English but are not available in bookstores anymore today.

Cassian was later married to Al. I. Ștefănescu. Although born into a Jewish family, he was Romanian Orthodox, and during their marriage, she stated that she was much closer to his religion than to Judaism, and that she had never read a page of the Talmud.

=== Emigration and life in the USA ===
Cassian travelled to the United States as a visiting professor for creative writing at New York University in 1985. During her stay in America, a friend of hers, Gheorghe Ursu, was arrested and subsequently beaten to death by the Securitate for possessing a diary. The diary contained several of Cassian's poems which satirized the Communist regime and the authorities thought to be inflammatory. Hence, she decided to remain in the US.

She was granted asylum in the United States, and continued to live in New York City. Eventually, she became an American citizen.

In the US, she started writing poems in English and published in The New Yorker, The Atlantic Monthly and other magazines. Some of these poems were also published in collections, for example Life Sentence in 1990 and Take My Word for It in 1998, both of which are still available today.

In the US, she was married to Maurice Edwards (1922–2020), former executive director and artistic director of the Brooklyn Philharmonic Orchestra.

Cassian died of a cardiac arrest or heart attack in New York on 14 April 2014. She is survived by her husband.

== Books ==
- La scara 1/1, Bucharest, 1947
- Sufletul nostru, Bucharest, 1949
- An viu nouă sute șaptesprezece, Bucharest, 1949
- Nică fără frică, Bucharest, 1950
- Ce-a văzut Oana, Bucharest, 1952
- Horea nu mai este singur, Bucharest, 1952
- Tinerețe, Bucharest, 1953
- Florile patriei, Bucharest, 1954
- Versuri alese, Bucharest, 1955
- Vârstele anului, Bucharest, 1957
- Dialogul vântului cu marea, Bucharest, 1957
- Botgros, cățel fricos, Bucharest, 1957
- Prințul Miorlau, Bucharest, 1957
- Chipuri hazlii pentru copii, Bucharest, 1958
- Aventurile lui Trompișor, Bucharest, 1959
- Încurcă-lume, Bucharest, 1961
- Sărbătorile zilnice, Bucharest, 1961
- Spectacol în aer liber. O monografie a dragostei, Bucharest, 1961
- Curcubeu, Bucharest, 1962
- Poezii, foreword by Ovid S. Crohmălniceanu, Bucharest, 1962
- Să ne facem daruri, Bucharest, 1963
- Disciplina harfei, Bucharest, 1965
- Îl cunoașteți pe Tică?, Bucharest, 1966
- Sângele, Bucharest, 1966
- Destinele paralele. La scara 1/1,1967
- Uite-l este... Uite-l nu e, Bucharest, 1967
- Ambitus, Bucharest, 1969
- Întâmplări cu haz, Bucharest, 1969
- Povestea a doi pui de tigru numiți Ninigra și Aligru, Bucharest, 1969
- Cronofagie. 1944-1969, Bucharest, 1970
- Recviem, Bucharest, 1971
- Marea conjugare, Bucharest, 1971
- Atât de grozavă și adio. Confidențe fictive, Bucharest, 1971; Second edition (Confidențe fictive. Atât de grozavă și adio și alte proze), Bucharest, 1976
- Loto-Poeme, Bucharest, 1971
- Spectacol în aer liber. O (altă) monografie a dragostei, foreword by Liviu Călin, Bucharest, 1974
- Între noi, copii, Bucharest, 1974
- O sută de poeme, Bucharest, 1975
- Viraje-Virages, bilingual edition, translated by the author, Eugene Guillevic and Lily Denis, Bucharest, 1978
- De îndurare, Bucharest, 1981
- Blue Apple, translation by Eva Feiler, New York, 1981
- Numărătoarea inversă, Bucharest, 1983
- Jocuri de vacanță, Bucharest, 1983
- Roșcată ca arama și cei șapte șoricei, Bucharest, 1985
- Copper Red and the Seven Dachsies, 1985
- Lady of Miracles, translation by Laura Schiff, Berkeley, 1988
- Call Yourself Alive, translation by Brenda Walker and Andreea Deletant, London, 1988
- Life Sentence, New York-London, 1990
- Cheerleader for a Funeral, translation by the author and Brenda Walker, London-Boston, 1992
- Desfacerea lumii, Bucharest, 1997
- Take My Word for It, New York, 1997
- Something Old, Something New: Poems and Drawings, Tuscaloosa, 2002
- Memoria ca zestre, Cartea I (1948–1953, 1975–1979, 1987–2003), Cartea a II-a (1954–1985, 2003–2004), Cartea a III-a (1985–2005), Bucharest, 2003–2005
- Continuum, New York, 2009

== Presence in English language anthologies ==
- Testament – 400 Years of Romanian Poetry – 400 de ani de poezie românească – bilingual edition – Daniel Ioniță (editor and principal translator) with Daniel Reynaud, Adriana Paul & Eva Foster – Editura Minerva, 2019 – ISBN 978-973-21-1070-6
- Romanian Poetry from its Origins to the Present – bilingual edition English/Romanian – Daniel Ioniță (editor and principal translator) with Daniel Reynaud, Adriana Paul and Eva Foster – Australian-Romanian Academy Publishing – 2020 – ISBN 978-0-9953502-8-1 ; OCLC 1288167046
- Born in Utopia – An anthology of Modern and Contemporary Romanian Poetry - Carmen Firan and Paul Doru Mugur (editors) with Edward Foster – Talisman House Publishers – 2006 – ISBN 1-58498-050-8
- Testament – Anthology of Romanian Verse – American Edition - monolingual English language edition – Daniel Ioniță (editor and principal translator) with Eva Foster, Daniel Reynaud and Rochelle Bews – Australian-Romanian Academy for Culture – 2017 – ISBN 978-0-9953502-0-5
