= Ștefan Augustin Doinaș =

Romanian Neoclassical poet

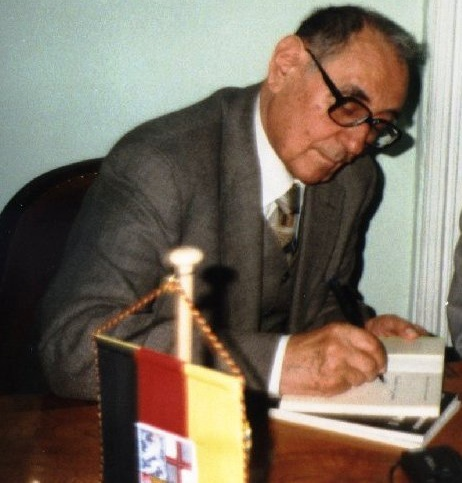
- Ștefan Augustin Doinaș
- Born: April 26, 1922; Cherechiu, Bihor County, Kingdom of Romania
- Died: May 25, 2002 (aged 80); Bucharest, Romania
- Resting place: Bellu Cemetery, Bucharest
- Education: University of Cluj
- Spouse: Irinel Liciu (m. 1958–2002)

Senator of Romania
- In office 25 February 1993 – November 1996

Ștefan Augustin Doinaș (Romanian pronunciation: [ʃteˈfan awɡusˈtin dojˈnaʃ]; pen name of Ștefan Popa) (April 26, 1922 – May 25, 2002) was a Romanian Neoclassical poet of the Communist era. He wrote 23 books of poetry, as well as children's books, essay collections, and a novel.

Doinaș was born in Cherechiu, Bihor County. After graduating from the Moise Nicoară High School in Arad, he studied medicine in Sibiu, where the University of Cluj had moved in the wake of the Hungarian occupation of Northern Transylvania. There he joined the Sibiu Literary Circle, a group formed around Lucian Blaga. Doinaș then studied philosophy and literature at the University of Cluj, graduating with a B.A. degree in 1947. Starting in 1948, he taught at schools in Hălmagiu and Gurahonț, in Arad County.

After moving to Bucharest in 1955, he was arrested in 1957 by the Securitate for "failure to report" and turn over a fellow editor, who had invited his colleagues to participate in an anti-communist protest. He was released from prison one year later, and was subsequently rehabilitated by the Communist authorities. Doinaș published his first volume of poems, Cartea mareelor ("The Book of Tides"), in 1964. Some of his most famous works include: Omul cu compasul, Seminția lui Laokoon, Anotimpul discret, Interiorul unui poem, and Lamentații. In 1992, he became a member of the Romanian Academy, and in 2002, honorary president of the Writers' Union of Romania. Elected in 1992 to the Senate of Romania as a member of the Civic Alliance Party, he served until 1996.

Doinaș died of throat cancer at Fundeni Hospital Bucharest. That night, his wife Irinel Liciu, a former first ballerina whom he had married in 1958, committed suicide; she was 74. The two were buried in the city's Bellu Cemetery.

== Presence in English Language Anthologies ==
- Testament - 400 Years of Romanian Poetry - 400 de ani de poezie românească - bilingual edition - Daniel Ioniță (editor and principal translator) with Daniel Reynaud, Adriana Paul & Eva Foster - Editura Minerva, 2019 - ISBN 978-973-21-1070-6
- Romanian Poetry from its Origins to the Present - bilingual edition English/Romanian - Daniel Ioniță (editor and principal translator) with Daniel Reynaud, Adriana Paul and Eva Foster - Australian-Romanian Academy Publishing - 2020 - ISBN 978-0-9953502-8-1; OCLC 1288167046
- Born in Utopia - An anthology of Modern and Contemporary Romanian Poetry - Carmen Firan and Paul Doru Mugur (editors) with Edward Foster - Talisman House Publishers - 2006 - ISBN 1-58498-050-8
- Testament - Anthology of Romanian Verse - American Edition - monolingual English language edition - Daniel Ioniță (editor and principal translator) with Eva Foster, Daniel Reynaud and Rochelle Bews - Australian-Romanian Academy for Culture - 2017 - ISBN 978-0-9953502-0-5
