= Ion Barbu =

Romanian mathematician and poet (1895 - 1961)

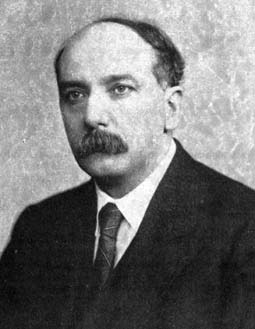
- Born: Dan Barbilian; March 18, 1895; Câmpulung, Kingdom of Romania
- Died: August 11, 1961 (aged 66); Bucharest, Romanian People's Republic
- Resting place: Bellu Cemetery, Sector 4, Bucharest, Romania; 44°24′26.87″N 26°5′49.06″E
- Citizenship: Kingdom of Romania; Romanian People's Republic
- Education: University of Groningen; University of Tübingen; University of Berlin
- Alma mater: University of Bucharest (BS and PhD in Mathematics)
- Occupations: poet; mathematician
- Years active: 1919–1961
- Era: Interwar period
- Notable work: Second game (Joc secund)
- Movement: Parnassianism; Hermeticism; Expressionism
- Spouse: Gerda Barbilian
- Parents: Constantin Barbilian (father); Smaranda Șoiculescu (mother)
- Scientific career
- Fields: Geometry
- Workplaces: University of Bucharest
- Thesis: Canonical representation of the addition of hyperelliptic functions (1929)
- Doctoral advisor: Gheorghe Țițeica

Ion Barbu (Romanian pronunciation: [iˈon ˈbarbu], pen name of Dan Barbilian; 18 March 1895 –11 August 1961) was a Romanian mathematician and poet. His name is associated with the Mathematics Subject Classification number 51C05, which is a major posthumous recognition reserved only to pioneers of investigations in an area of mathematical inquiry. As a poet, he is known for his volume Joc secund ("Mirrored Play"), in which he sought to fulfill his vision of a poetry which adhered to the same virtues that he found in mathematics.

== Early life ==
Born in Câmpulung-Muscel, Argeș County, he was the son of Constantin Barbilian and Smaranda, born Șoiculescu. He attended elementary school in Câmpulung, Dămienești, and Stâlpeni, and for secondary studies he went to the Ion Brătianu High School in Pitești, the Dinicu Golescu High School in Câmpulung, and finally the Gheorghe Lazăr High School and the Mihai Viteazul High School in Bucharest. During that time, he discovered that he had a talent for mathematics, and started publishing in Gazeta Matematică; it was also then that he discovered his passion for poetry.

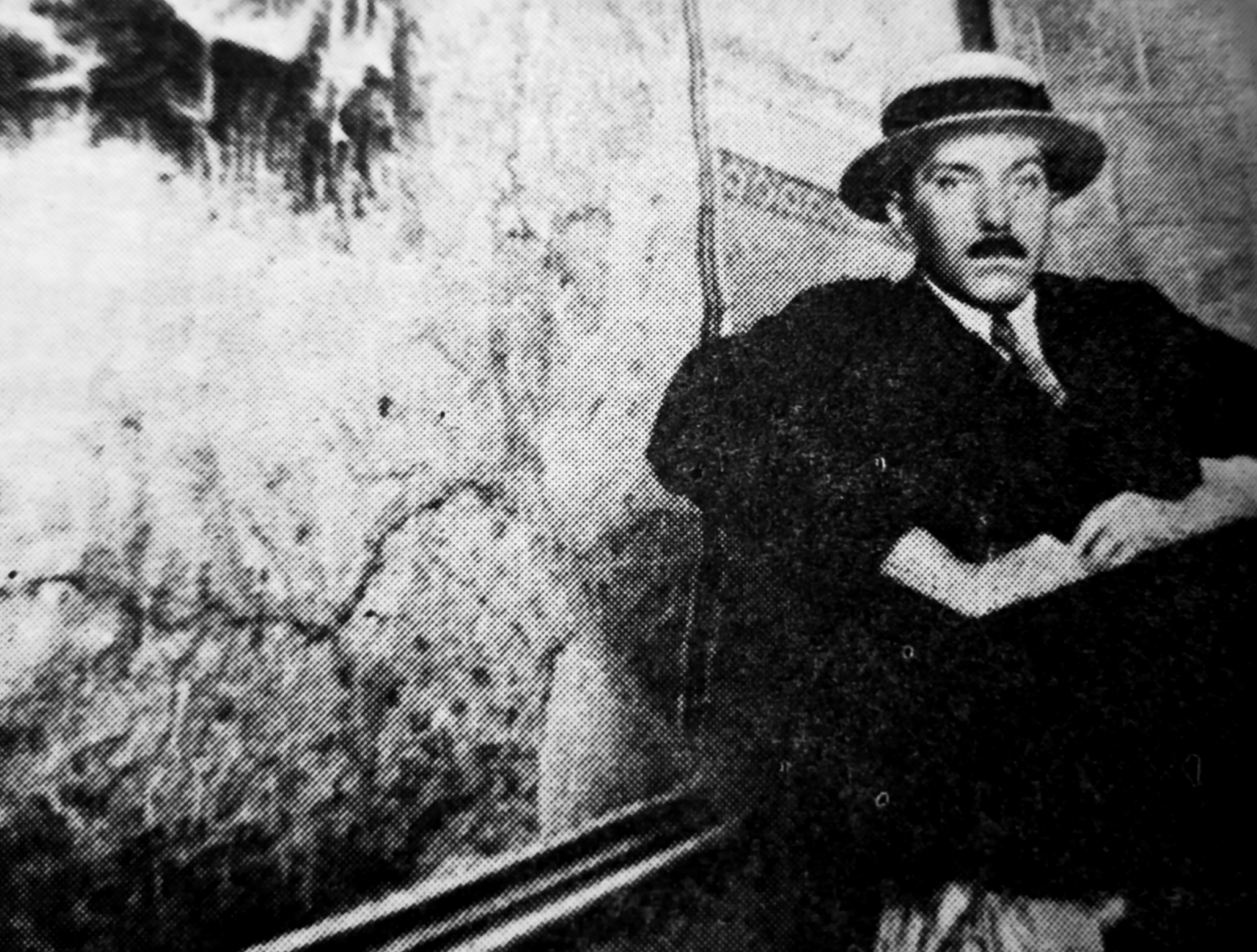
Barbu at his Spiru Haret High School teacher's desk, October 1927

He was a student at the University of Bucharest when World War I caused his studies to be interrupted by military service. After being sent to Botoșani in December 1916, he attended the Reserve Officers' School in Bârlad and was promoted to the rank of corporal in April 1917. Serving under the command of major Barbu Alinescu, he advanced to platoon leader by April 1918, and went into reserve as a sub-lieutenant in 1919. Barbilian completed his undergraduate degree in 1921. The next year he won a doctoral grant to go to the University of Göttingen, where he studied number theory with Edmund Landau for two years. However, he attended few classes, suffered from cocaine and ether addiction, and eventually abandoned his studies at Göttingen. Returning to Bucharest, chronically ill as a result of drug intoxication, he was hospitalized for rehabilitation from August 1924 to January 1925. In 1925 he began to teach mathematics at Spiru Haret High School, along with his German wife, Gerda, who taught German literature. He then studied with Gheorghe Țițeica, completing in 1929 his Ph.D. thesis, Reprezentarea canonică a adunării funcțiilor ipereliptice (Canonical representation of the addition of hyperelliptic functions). The thesis defense committee was presided by David Emmanuel and included Țițeica and Dimitrie Pompeiu. In the spring of 1929 he bought a house at 8, Carol Davila Street, Bucharest, where he would live for the rest of his life. For a while, he taught at the Cantemir Vodă High School. In the summer of 1937, he served as president of the commission administering the Baccalaureate at the Gheorghe Lazăr High School in Sibiu, after which he issued a scathing report to the Ministry of Education.

== Achievements in mathematics ==
=== Apollonian metric ===
In 1935, Barbilian published his article describing metrization of a region K, the interior of a simple closed curve J. Let xy denote the Euclidean distance from x to y. Barbilian's function for the distance from a to b in K is

$$d(a,b) = \log \underset{p \in J}{\max} (pa/pb) + \log \underset{q \in J}{\max} (qb/qa) .$$

As Barbilian noted, this construction generates various geometries that are generalizations of the Klein projective model; he highlighted four special cases, including the Poincaré disk model in hyperbolic geometry. At the University of Missouri in 1938 Leonard Blumenthal wrote Distance Geometry. A Study of the Development of Abstract Metrics, where he used the term "Barbilian spaces" for metric spaces based on Barbilian's function to obtain their metric. And in 1954 the American Mathematical Monthly published an article by Paul J. Kelly on Barbilian's method of metrizing a region bounded by a curve. Barbilian claimed he did not have access to Kelly's publication, but he did read Blumenthal's review of it in Mathematical Reviews and he understood Kelly's construction. This motivated him to write in final form a series of four papers, which appeared after 1958, where the metric geometry of the spaces that today bears his name is investigated thoroughly.

He answered in 1959 with an article which described "a very general procedure of metrization through which the positive functions of two points, on certain sets, can be refined to a distance." Besides Blumenthal and Kelly, articles on "Barbilian spaces" have appeared in the 1990s from Patricia Souza, while Wladimir G. Boskoff, Marian G. Ciucă and Bogdan Suceavă wrote in the 2000s about "Barbilian's metrization procedure". Barbilian indicated in his paper Asupra unui principiu de metrizare that he preferred the term "Apollonian metric space", and articles from Alan F. Beardon, Frederick Gehring and Kari Hag, Peter A. Häströ, Zair Ibragimov and others use that term. According to Suceavă, "Barbilian's metrization procedure is important for at least three reasons: (1) It yields a natural generalization of Poincaré and Beltrami–Klein's hyperbolic geometries; (2) It has been studied in the context of the study of Apollonian metric; (3) Provides a large class of examples of Lagrange generalized metrics irreducible to Riemann, Finsler, or Lagrange metrics."

=== Ring geometry ===
Barbilian made a contribution to the foundations of geometry with his articles in 1940 and 1941 in Jahresbericht der Deutschen Mathematiker-Vereinigung on projective planes with coordinates from a ring. According to Boskoff and Suceavă, this work "inspired research in ring geometries, nowadays associated with his, Hjelmslev's and Klingenberg's names." A more critical stance was taken in 1995 by Ferdinand D. Velkamp:

A systematic study of projective planes over large classes of associative rings was initiated by D. Barbilian. His very general approach in [1940 and 41] remained rather unsatisfactory, however, his axioms were partly of a geometric nature, partly algebraic as pertaining to the ring of coordinates, and there were a number of difficulties which Barbilian could not overcome.

Nevertheless, in 1989 John R. Faulkner wrote an article "Barbilian Planes" that clarified terminology and advanced the study. In his introduction, he wrote:

A classical result from projective geometry is that a Desarguesian projective plane is coordinatized by an associative division ring. A Barbilian plane is a geometric structure which extends the notion of a projective plane and thereby allows a coordinate ring which is not necessarily a division ring. There are advantages ...

The terms affine Barbilian plane and Barbilian domain were introduced by Werner Leissner in 1975, in two papers ("Affine Barbilian planes I and II"). Referring to these papers, Dirk Keppens says that Leissner introduced this terminology "as a tribute to Barbilian, who was one of the founders of (projective) ring geometry."

=== Textbooks ===
- 1956: "Teoria aritmetică a idealelor (în inele necomutative)", Editura Academiei Republicii Populare Romîne, Bucharest. MR 0085247
- 1960: "Grupuri cu operatori: Teoremele de descompunere ale algebrei", Editura Academiei Republicii Popular Romîne, Bucharest. MR 0125888

== Academic career ==
In 1930, Barbilian returned to full-time mathematics and joined the academic staff at the University of Bucharest. In 1942, he was named professor, with some help from fellow mathematician Grigore Moisil.

As a mathematician, Barbilian authored 80 research papers and studies. His last paper, written in collaboration with Nicolae Radu, appeared posthumously, in 1962, and is the last in the cycle of four works where he investigates the Apollonian metric.

== Poetry ==
Barbu made his literary debut in 1918 in Alexandru Macedonski's magazine Literatorul, and then started contributing to Sburătorul, where Eugen Lovinescu saw him as a "new poet". His first volume of poetry, După melci ("After Snails"), was published in 1921. This was followed by his major work, Joc secund, published in 1930, to critical acclaim. The volume contains some 35 of Barbu’s total published output of around 100 poems.

His poem Ut algebra poesis (As Algebra, So Poetry), written in to his fellow poet Nina Cassian (with whom he had fallen in love), alludes to his regret at having abandoned his studies at Göttingen and an appreciation of two great mathematicians: Emmy Noether, who he had met there, and Carl Friedrich Gauss, who left a lasting legacy at Göttingen.

Ut algebra poesis [Ninei Cassian]
La anii-mi încă tineri, în târgul Göttingen,
Cum Gauss, altădată, sub curba lui alee
— Boltirea geometriei astrale să încheie —
Încovoiam poemul spre ultimul catren.
[..]
Și algebrista Emmy, sordida și divina,
Al cărei steag și preot abia să fiu,
Se mută-m nefireasca — nespus de albă ! — Nina.

Translation:

As Algebra, So Poetry [For Nina Cassian]
In my young days I strolled the lanes of Göttingen -
Where Gauss, beneath arched canopies of leaves,
Sealed once for all the vaults of higher geometries -
And curved a poem towards its last quatrain.
[..]
And algebraist Emmy, both common and divine,
Whose priest and standard-bearer I would dare emerge,
Surpasses Nina—transcendental and indescribably fair!

—translation by Sarah Glaz and JoAnne Growney

According to Loveday Kempthorne and Peter Donelan, Barbu "saw mathematics and poetry as equally capable of holding the answer to understanding and reaching a transcendental ideal." He is known as "one of the greatest Romanian poets of the twentieth century and perhaps the greatest of all" according to Romanian literary critic Alexandru Ciorănescu.

== Political creed ==
Barbu was mostly apolitical, with one exception: around 1940 he became a sympathizer of the fascist movement The Iron Guard (hoping to be promoted to full professor if they came to power), dedicating a poem to one of its leaders, Corneliu Zelea Codreanu. In 1940, he also wrote a poem praising Hitler. Suceavă attributes these moves to be opportunistic devices in a professional advancement plan and ignores Barbu’s own explanation, that he was attempting to deflect attention from the fact that he was hiding in his house his wife’s brother, a German citizen who eluded conscription by staying hidden in Romania.

After the Communists came to power in the wake of World War II, his friend Alexandru Rosetti sought to convince Barbu to write poems praising the new regime. Barbu reluctantly wrote in early 1948 one poem that can be interpreted as pro-communist, namely "Bălcescu living", but he never relapsed and kept his dignified demeanor until the end.

== Death and legacy ==
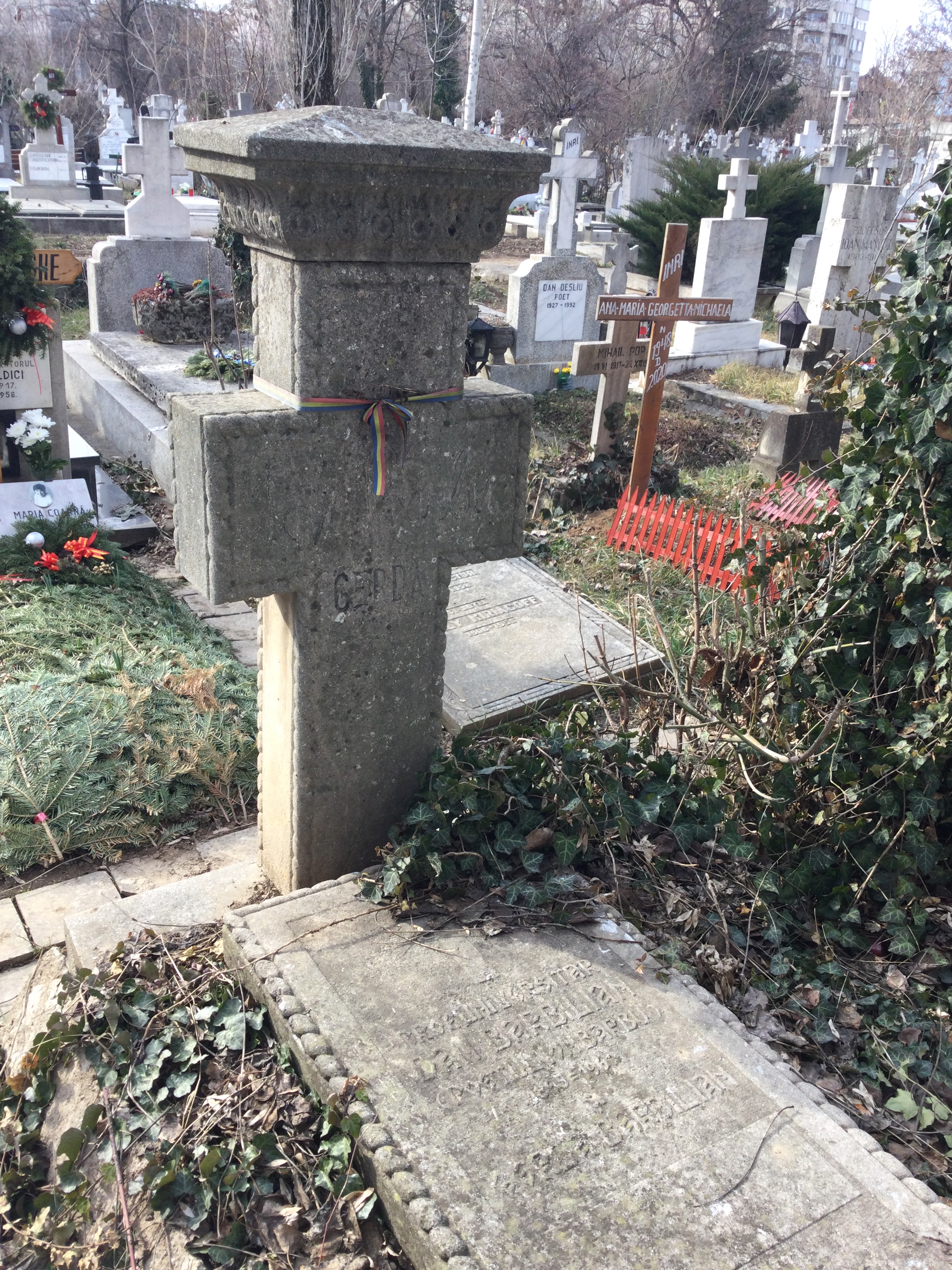
Grave in Bellu Cemetery

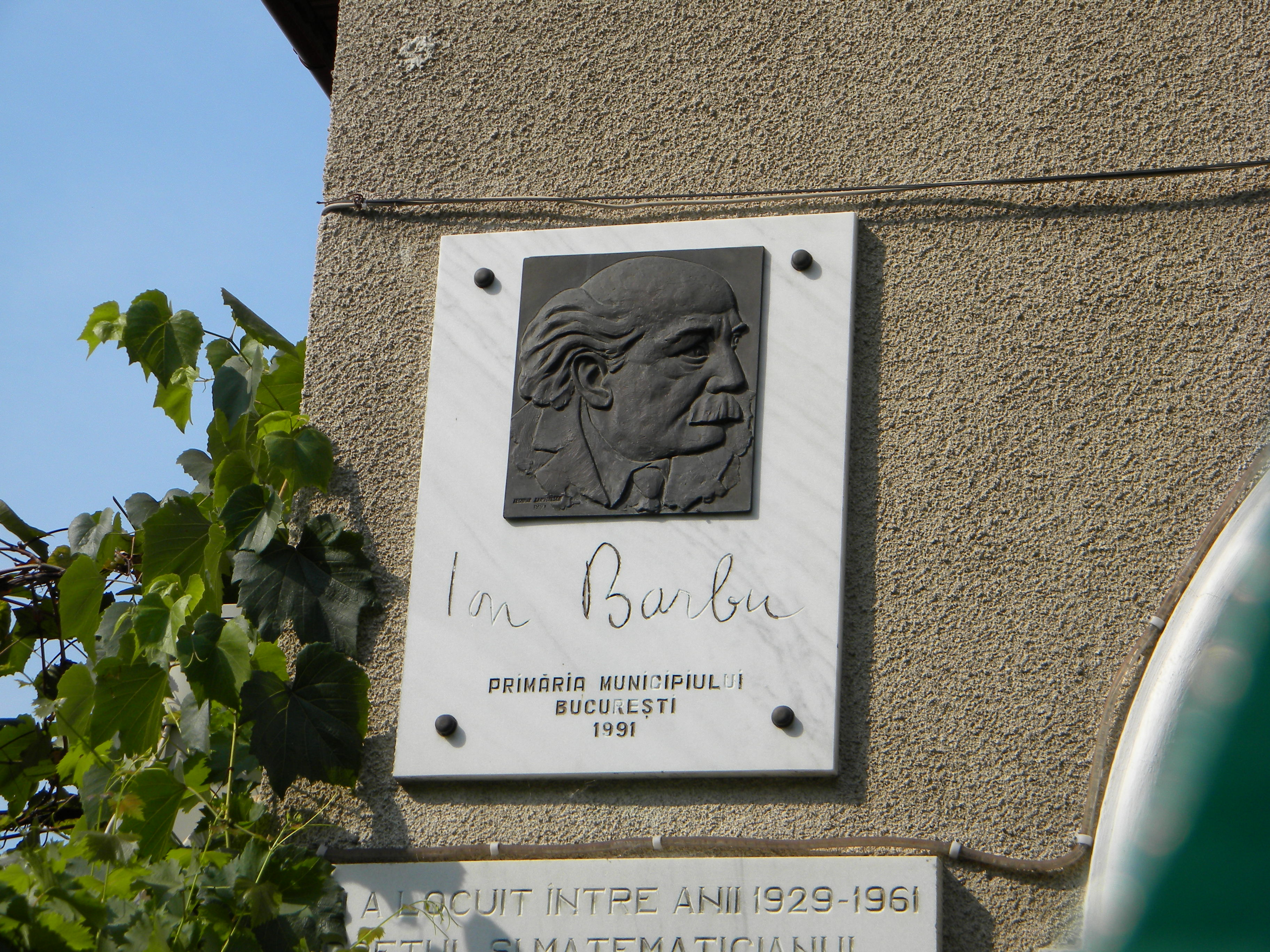
Commemorative plaque affixed on Barbu's house by the Bucharest City Hall in 1991

Ion Barbu died of liver failure in Bucharest in 1961. He is buried in the city's Bellu Cemetery.

The Dan Barbilian Theoretical High School in Câmpulung, the Ion Barbu Theoretical High School in Pitești, the Ion Barbu Technological High School in Giurgiu, and a secondary school in Galați are all named after him. There are Ion Barbu streets in Alba Iulia, Hărman, Murfatlar, Sânmartin, Șelimbăr, Tâncăbești, Timișoara, Zalău, and 1 Decembrie, and Dan Barbilian streets in Câmpulung and Giurgiu.

== Presence in English language anthologies ==
- Born in Utopia - An anthology of Modern and Contemporary Romanian Poetry - Carmen Firan and Paul Doru Mugur (editors) with Edward Foster - Talisman House Publishers - 2006 - ISBN 1-58498-050-8
- Testament - Anthology of Romanian Verse - American Edition - monolingual English language edition - Daniel Ioniță (editor and principal translator) with Eva Foster, Daniel Reynaud and Rochelle Bews - Australian-Romanian Academy for Culture - 2017 - ISBN 978-0-9953502-0-5
- Testament – 400 Years of Romanian Poetry – 400 de ani de poezie românească – bilingual edition – Daniel Ioniță (editor and principal translator) with Daniel Reynaud, Adriana Paul & Eva Foster – Editura Minerva, 2019 – ISBN 978-973-21-1070-6
- Romanian Poetry from its Origins to the Present – bilingual edition English/Romanian – Daniel Ioniță (editor and principal translator) with Daniel Reynaud, Adriana Paul and Eva Foster – Australian-Romanian Academy Publishing – 2020 – ISBN 978-0-9953502-8-1 ; OCLC 1288167046
