= Ana Blandiana =

Romanian writer (born 1942)

- Otilia Valeria Coman
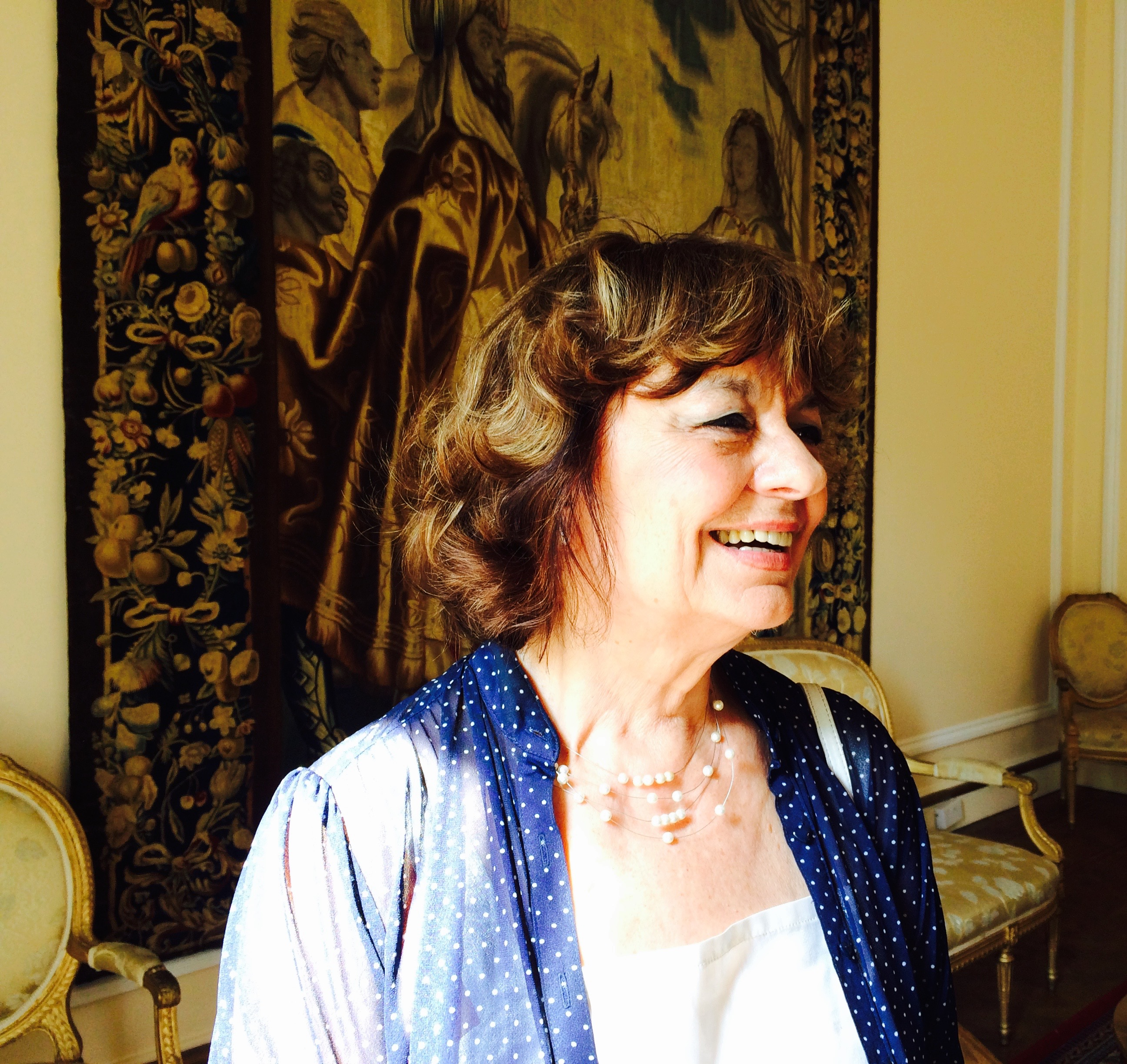
- Blandiana in 2016
- Born: 25 March 1942 (age 84); Timișoara, Romania
- Education: Babeș-Bolyai University
- Occupations: Poet, writer, memoirist, novelist, playwright, translator
- Writing career
- Pen name: Ana Blandiana
- Language: Romanian
- Genres: Prose, poetry

Ana Blandiana (Romanian pronunciation: [ˈana blandiˈana]; pen name of Otilia Valeria Coman; born 25 March 1942) is a Romanian poet, essayist, and political figure. She took her name after Blandiana, near Vințu de Jos, Alba County, her mother's home village.

In October 2017, she was announced as The Griffin Trust For Excellence In Poetry's twelfth recipient of their Lifetime Recognition Award.

In October 2024, her literary work was recognised with the Princess of Asturias Award.

In May 2026, she received the Zbigniew Herbert International Literary Award.

== Literary career ==
Ana Blandiana was born Otilia Valeria Coman on 25 March 1942. Her father was Gheorghe (1915-1964), an orthodox priest, graduated the Faculties of Theology and of Law at the University of Cernăuți (1937), followed by the Pedagogical Seminary affiliated with the Faculty of Letters in the same city. He taught religion and philosophy at the Commercial High School in Timișoara as well as labor legislation at the Industrial Vocational School, where he also served as director. He held the position of office chief at the Orthodox Diocese of Timișoara, while also serving as a priest. During the Legionary rebellion of January 1941, he held a speech the balcony of the Timișoara Prefecture, and called on the combatants not to open fire and avoid the bloodshed. From October 1941, he served as inspector at the General Labor Inspectorate in Timișoara, and in this position he established and managed canteens, libraries, choirs, and brass bands. On November 1, 1944, after Romania changed its allegiances and fought against Germany, he was mobilized to the Western Front. Father Coman rebuilt a church in Banská Bystrica (Slovakia), where he held services on holidays for soldiers and the wounded, and supported the free distribution of religious materials. After the war, between December 15, 1945, and October 1, 1948, he was a professor in the Legal-Economic Department at the Boys' Commercial High School in Oradea as well as the parish priest. With the support of parishioners through donations, and with help from various church and state institutions, he built a church dedicated to Saint Nicholas. In 1948, he was no longer allowed to work in public education and instead became a priest and administrator of the diocesan candle factory. Starting 1952 he was transferred and removed in 1955, from the cathedral parish and appointed and acted as an economic advisor until February 1, 1957, when he returned to the cathedral. On June 15, 1959, at his own request, he was transferred to the Seleuș-Oradea Parish. This year he received a suspended 2-year correctional prison sentence from the People's Tribunal of Oradea for "illegal possession of a weapon"—in reality, a setup by the Securitate during a house search. He was arrested on September 12, 1959 and later spent years in Communist prisons, dying in an accident weeks after his release in a general amnesty. Blandiana's mother, Otilia (Diacu), worked as an accountant. Her sister Geta was born in 1947. In 1960 she married the writer Romulus Rusan.

After her debut in 1959, in Tribuna, Cluj, where she signed for the first time as Ana Blandiana, she was published in the anthology 30 de poeți tineri ("30 Young Poets"). In 1963, after a four-year interdiction due to her father's status, she again published in Contemporanul (edited by George Ivașcu).

Her editorial debut took place in 1964 with the booklet of poems Persoana întâia plural ("First Person Plural"), with a Foreword written by Nicolae Manolescu. She became known for her Calcâiul vulnerabil ("Achilles' Heel", 1966) and A treia taină ("The Third Secret", 1969). In 1966, Blandiana appeared for the first time at the International Poem Contest (in Lahti, Finland).

In 1967, she settled in Bucharest; until the following year, she was one of the editors for Viața studențească, and then (until 1975) worked as editor for Amfiteatru. She gave two televised readings in 1969, in the company of Andrei Șerban and the actors Irina Petrescu, Mariana Mihuț, and Florian Pittiș.

Between 1975 and 1977, she was a librarian at the Institute of Fine Arts in Bucharest. In 1976, her works were first printed in a French translation, in Croisière du Club des Poètes by fr:Jean-Pierre Rosnay (Paris); in 1978, she took part in the First International Festival of Poetry in Paris organized by the famed Club des Poètes.

In the late 1980s, Blandiana started writing protest poems against the communist regime.

In 1984 Blandiana's poem 'Totul' ('Everything') was briefly published in the literary magazine Amfiteatru. 'Totul' was a list of elements of everyday life in Bucharest at the time, composed as a comment on the contrast between the official view of life in Romania and the alternative perception of its monotonous shabbiness. The critical nature of the poem led to the edition of Amfiteatru being withdrawn within hours of publication with the editors being dismissed. Nevertheless, the poem appeared in translation in Western media and also had limited underground circulation in Romania.

In 1987 she published at the Sport-Turism Publishing House the book "Orașe de silabe" ("City of syllables") where she writes about all the countries and cities of the world where she travelled: over 100. The same year, 1987, she is published in USSR, at Raduga Publishing House from Moscow, with the Russian title "Стихотворения, рассказы, эссе" ("Poems, stories, essays"). Even though the secret services of Ceaușescu ('Securitate') attribute her a dissident status, in 1989 the Minerva Publishing House is publishing in the most popular mass collection "Biblioteca Pentru Toți" ("Library for all people") an anthology of her poems. Her friends sustain that the book never seen the bookshelves of the libraries. However, "Poezii" ("Poems") has a 'Foreword' written by Eugen Simion.

After the Romanian Revolution of 1989, she entered political life, campaigning for the removal of the communist legacy from administrative office, as well as for an open society. She left literary work in the background, although she did publish Arhitectura valurilor ("Waves' Architecture", 1990), 100 de poeme ("100 Poems", 1991), and Sertarul cu aplauze ("The Drawer of Applause", prose, 1992).

Ana Blandiana has also published: 50 de poeme, ("50 Poems"), 1970: Octombrie, Noiembrie, Decembrie ("October, November, December"), 1972; Întâmplări din grădina mea (Occurrences in My Garden), 1980; Ora de nisip ("The Hour of Sand"), 1984; Întâmplări de pe strada mea (Occurrences on My Street), 1988; În dimineața de după moarte ("On the Morning After Dying"), 1996; La cules îngeri ("Angel Gathering"), 1997; Cartea albă a lui Arpagic ("Arpagic's White Book"), 1998. She has also authored 6 books of essays and 4 books of other prose writings. Her work was translated into 16 languages.

Ora de nisip ("The Hour of Sand") has been translated into English by Peter Jay and Anca Cristofovici.

== Presence in English language anthologies ==
- 2019 -Testament - 400 Years of Romanian Poetry/400 de ani de poezie românească - Minerva Publishing 2019 - Daniel Ioniță (editor and principal translator), with Daniel Reynaud, Adriana Paul, and Eva Foster. ISBN 978-973-21-1070-6
- 2020 - Romanian Poetry from its Origins to the Present - bilingual edition - Daniel Ioniță (editor and principal translator) with Daniel Reynaud, Adriana Paul, and Eva Foster - Australian-Romanian Academy Publishing - 2020 - ISBN 978-0-9953502-8-1 ; OCLC 1288167046
- Testament - Anthology of Romanian Verse - American Edition - monolingual English language edition - Daniel Ioniță (editor and principal translator) with Eva Foster, Daniel Reynaud, and Rochelle Bews - Australian-Romanian Academy for Culture - 2017 - ISBN 978-0-9953502-0-5
- Born in Utopia - An anthology of Modern and Contemporary Romanian Poetry - Carmen Firan and Paul Doru Mugur (editors) with Edward Foster - Talisman House Publishers - 2006 - ISBN 1-58498-050-8
- The Phantom Church and Other Stories from Romania - Georgiana Farnoaga and Sharon King (editors and translators) - University of Pittsburgh Press - 1997 - ISBN 978-0-8229-5608-2

== Affiliations ==
- Member of the Writers' Union of Romania
- Member of the European Academy of Poetry
- 1990- 2004 President of the Romanian PEN Club (after its re-establishment in 1990)
- 1994 - Founder and leader of the Civic Alliance Foundation, a Romanian non-party movement, whose aim was to alleviate the consequences of more than fifty years of communism in Romania.
