= Marin Sorescu =

Romanian poet and novelist

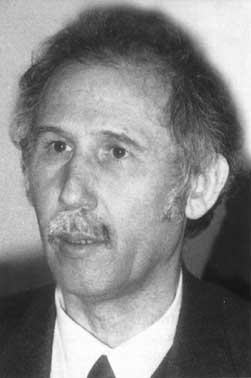

Minister of Culture of Romania
- In office 25 November 1993 – 5 May 1995
- Prime Minister: Nicolae Văcăroiu
- Preceded by: Petre Sălcudeanu
- Succeeded by: Viorel Mărginean

Personal details
- Born: 29 February 1936 Bulzești, Dolj County, Kingdom of Romania
- Died: 8 December 1996 (aged 60) (Myocardial infarction) Bucharest, Romania
- Party: Independent politician
- Education: Faculty of Letters, Alexandru Ioan Cuza University (1955–1960)
- Occupation: poet; playwright; writer; politician
- Awards: Herder Prize (1991)

Marin Sorescu (Romanian pronunciation: [maˈrin soˈresku]; 29 February 1936 – 8 December 1996) was a Romanian poet, playwright, writer, and politician. Marin Sorescu was born in Bulzești, Dolj County, and eventually graduated from the University of Iași with a degree in modern languages. His first book, a 1964 collection of parodies, gained wide attention and was followed by numerous volumes of poetry and prose that established him as a prominent literary figure. His popularity grew rapidly, and in 1971 he joined the International Writing Program at the University of Iowa. He often spoke ironically about his own work and described feeling alienated by language. Several of his poems were censored under the Nicolae Ceaușescu regime and were published only after the 1989 Revolution. Sorescu’s play, Iona, was published in 1968 and was considered a 'masterpiece.' He got sick with cirrhosis and hepatitis, and died at age 60 from a myocardial infarction induced heart attack.

== Biography ==
Born to a family of farmworkers in Bulzești, Dolj County, Sorescu graduated from the primary school in his home village. After that he went to the Frații Buzești High School in Craiova, after which he was transferred to the Predeal Military School. His final education was at the University of Iași, where, in 1960, he graduated with a degree in modern languages. His first book, a collection of parodies in 1964 entitled Singur printre poeți ("Alone Among Poets"), was widely discussed. He himself called them "sarcastic and awkward". Ten volumes of poetry and prose followed, having a very rapid ascension in the world of literary, as a poet, novelist, playwright, essayist. He grew so popular that his readings were held in football stadiums. In 1971, he was a resident of the International Writing Program at the University of Iowa.

On his poetry, Sorescu said, with characteristic irony: "Just as I can't give up smoking because I don't smoke, I can't give up writing because I have no talent." He often claimed a sense of alienation, saying "the spoken word is a crossed frontier. By the act of saying something, I fail to say many other things." On censorship, he said, after his last, post-1989 Revolution volumes were delayed, "we have won our freedom, so I mustn't complain. O censors, where are you now?"

Sorescu's collection of Censored Poems comprised poems which could not be published until after the Nicolae Ceaușescu dictatorship; of these, the best known is House under surveillance.

Iona, the play written by Marin Sorescu and first published in 1968 is widely considered a true masterpiece. The biblical myth says the prophet Iona (Jonah) was swallowed by a whale. In his play, Sorescu takes the story further and imagines what happens to Iona while he was inside the whale. "The most terrible part of the play is when Iona loses his echo", writes Sorescu in the foreword of this play. "Iona was alone, but his echo was whole. He shouted: Io-na, and his echo answered: Io-na. Then, it remained just half of the echo. He shouted Io-na, but all he could hear was Io. Io, in some ancient language, means me". Iona was played to a full house in Bucharest in 1969, but the tragedy was quickly withdrawn, because its content was considered too controversial.

Ill with cirrhosis and hepatitis, he got a myocardial infarction, which caused his heart attack at the Elias Hospital in Bucharest; he died at age 60, on 8 December 1996.

== Collections of Sorescu in English translation ==
- Marin Sorescu- Selected Poems (from 6 collections, 1965–73), translated Michael Hamburger (Bloodaxe, 1983) ISBN 0-906427-48-7
- The Biggest Egg in the World, translated by Ted Hughes, Seamus Heaney &c., ed. Edna Longley (Bloodaxe, 1987)
- Hands Behind My Back: Selected Poems, trans. Gabriela Dragnea, Adriana Varga, & Stuart Friebert (Oberlin College Press, 1991). ISBN 0-932440-58-4
- Censored Poems, translated John Hartley Williams & Hilde Ottschofski (Bloodaxe, 2001)
- The Bridge (Poems written by Sorescu on his death bed), translated Adam J Sorkin & Lidia Vianu (Bloodaxe, 2004)

== Sorescu in English language anthologies ==
- An Anthology of Contemporary Romanian Poetry (contains 22 poems by Sorescu), translated by Andrea Deletant and Brenda Walker (Forest Books, 1984) ISBN 0-9509487-4-8
- The Faber Book of Modern European Poetry, ed. A. Alvarez (Faber and Faber, 1992) ISBN 0-571-14321-0
- The Vintage Book of Contemporary World Poetry (pg. 219), edited by J.D. McClatchy (Vintage, 1996) ISBN 0-679-74115-1
- Bloodaxe Poetry Introductions: Enzensberger, Holub, Sorescu (contains 21 poems by Sorescu), ed. Neil Astley (Bloodaxe, 2006)
- Born in Utopia – An anthology of Modern and Contemporary Romanian Poetry - Carmen Firan and Paul Doru Mugur (editors) with Edward Foster – Talisman House Publishers – 2006 – ISBN 1-58498-050-8
- Testament – Anthology of Modern Romanian Verse - American Edition – Daniel Ioniță (editor and translator) with Eva Foster, Rochelle Bews, and Daniel Reynaud – monolingual English language edition – Australian-Romanian Academy Publishing – 2017 – ISBN 978-0-9953502-0-5
- 2019 -Testament - 400 Years of Romanian Poetry/400 de ani de poezie românească - Minerva Publishing 2019 - Daniel Ioniță (editor and principal translator) assisted by Daniel Reynaud, Adriana Paul and Eva Foster. ISBN 978-973-21-1070-6
- 2020 - Romanian Poetry from its Origins to the Present - bilingual edition - Daniel Ioniță (editor and principal translator) with Daniel Reynaud, Adriana Paul and Eva Foster - Australian-Romanian Academy Publishing - 2020 - ISBN 978-0-9953502-8-1 ; OCLC 1288167046

== Awards ==
- Romanian Academy prize, 1968, 1977
- The Gold Medal for Poetry "Napoli ospite", Italy, 1970
- The Prize of the Romanian Academy for Drama, 1970
- "Le Muse", granted by Accademie delle Muse, Florence, 1978
- The International Poetry Prize "Fernado Riello", Madrid, Spain, 1983
- The International Herder Prize, granted by the University of Vienna in 1991 for his entire activity
- Romanian Writers' Union prize (6 times, for poetry, drama, and literary criticism)

He was also nominated to the Nobel Prize in Literature.

== Affiliations ==
- 1971 – Fellow, International Writing Program, University of Iowa
- 1983 – Member of Mallarmé Academy, Paris
- 1992 – Member of the Romanian Academy
- 1955 – Alumnus of Frații Buzești High School

== See also ==
- Romanian Academy
- Frații Buzești High School
- List of Romanian playwrights
