= Lucian Blaga =

Romanian philosopher and writer (1895–1961)

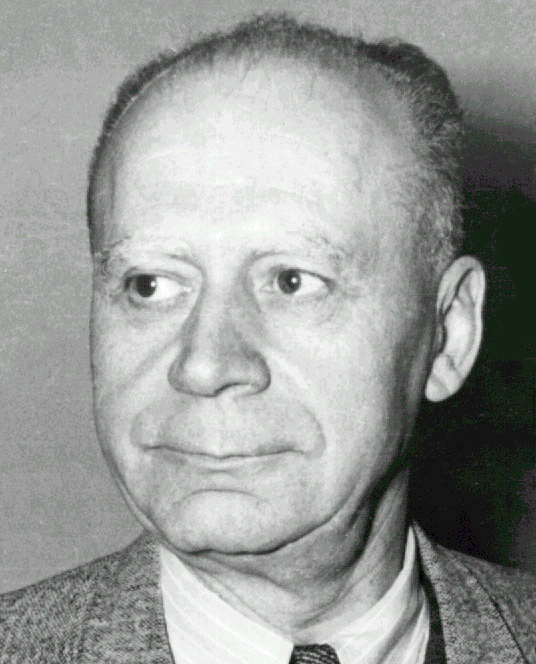
- Blaga's portrait, Museum of the Romanian Peasant
- Born: 9 May 1895; Lámkerék, Szeben County, Austro-Hungarian Empire (today Lancrăm, Alba County, Romania)
- Died: 6 May 1961 (aged 65); Cluj, Romanian People's Republic (today Cluj-Napoca, Romania)
- Resting place: Lancrăm, Sebeș Municipality, Alba County, Romania
- Education: University of Vienna (PhD)
- Occupations: diplomat; journalist; linguist; philosopher; poet; translator; writer
- Notable work: Poems of Light
- Movement: Modernism; expressionism
- Spouse: Cornelia Brediceanu
- Children: Dorli Blaga
- Parents: Isidor Blaga (father); Ana Moga (mother)
- Awards: Hamagiu Award (1935)

Member of the Senate of Romania
- In office 1938–1940

Personal details
- Party: National Christian Party; National Renaissance Front; National Popular Party

Lucian Blaga (Note: Romanian pronunciation: [lut͡ʃiˈan ˈblaɡa]) (9 May 1895 – 6 May 1961) was a Romanian philosopher, poet, playwright, poetry translator and novelist. He is one of the most important philosophers and poets of Romania, and a prominent philosopher of the interwar period in Eastern Europe who, due to the unfortunate circumstances surrounding his career, is barely known to the outside world.

== Biography ==
Lucian Blaga was born on 9 May 1895 in Lancrăm (then Lámkerék), near Alba Iulia (then Gyulafehérvár). He was the ninth child of Isidor Blaga, an Orthodox priest, and Ana Moga. Both his parents' families had deep ties with the church: Isidor's father, Simion Blaga, was also a priest and Ana's family tree had a long line of priests and a bishop. His father studied at Bruckenthal Highschool in Sibiu and according to Lucian Blaga his way of being was inline with "German cultural tradition": opened to technological progress and free thinking, sometimes in contrast with his profession which he did "without the impetus of true conviction".

In the autobiographical The Chronicle and the Song of Ages he recalls that he was "mute as a swan" until the age of five, his early childhood having been "under the sign of the incredible absence of the word". His mother, reassured by doctors that her child wasn't ill, tried to convince him to speak by saying that he wouldn't want other children to call him a mute:

"I looked at my mother with bright, understanding eyes. I listened to her, but not even after this torment did my words reveal themselves. Then, after a night of some inner turmoil, the meaning of which I forgot in my wordless life, I went to her. And I started speaking. I held my hand above my eyes, and spoke. From underneath the eaves made by my fingers and palm, with which I was shielding myself from the world of the words, the speech came out whole, clear, like sieved silver."

His education started in Hungarian in the neighbouring Sebeș, where he remained until 1906, after which he attended the "Andrei Șaguna" high school in Brașov between 1906 and 1914. His senior thesis was Albert Einstein’s relativity and Henri Poincaré’s non-Euclidean geometry. During the second year of high school his father, Isidor, died and he remained under the supervision of a relative, Iosif Blaga. At the outbreak of the World War I, he began theological studies in Sibiu to avoid being drafted in the Austro-Hungarian army (like many Romanians from Transylvania at the time). Between 1917 and 1920 he studied philosophy and biology at the University of Vienna. Here he published his first two books, a book of poetry and a book of aphorisms, which helped him finance his studies. Also here he first met his future wife, Cornelia Brediceanu, who was studying medicine. He obtained his PhD with the thesis Kultur und Erkenntnis – a study on the relation between culture and knowledge - in 1920. He summed his early views in his correspondence:

"Philosophy is art, and this will be my philosophy. I tend toward an organic and mobile, lifelike conception about the world — a conception that I will propagate around me not by argument but by a kind of artistic suggestion.... I won't 'prove, I will 'infect' the environment with great art. Life is transmitted from person to person in immediate fashion, without the bridge of arguments, since life is the creative force, and everything that is creation imposes itself naturally."

His 1919 Poems of Light, published by Sextil Pușcariu – an acquaintance of Cornelia's family - first in Glasul Bucovinei, then as a stand-alone volume, received very positive criticism, Blaga being acclaimed as a figure who "represented the Transylvania of today and tomorrow", his book placed along with the Bible on the nightstand for the Queen of Romania during her visit to Transylvania following the 1918 Union. This was to pave his way for a networking trip to Bucharest where he visited the Romanian Academy and met Nicolae Iorga and Alexandru Vlahuță, among others. However, having finished his studies at Vienna and in look for an academic position, his application to Romanian University of Cluj was not successful, his Habilitation Thesis "The Philosophy of Style" being rejected in 1924. He wrote in the regional press, being the editor of the magazines Cultura in Cluj and Banatul in Lugoj as well as for Patria, Voința, Adevărul literar și artistic, Universul cultural and others.

Demoralized after his failure to obtain a position at the university, he moves to Lugoj in 1926 and enters the Romanian diplomatic service, occupying posts at Romanian legations in Poland, Czechia, Portugal, Switzerland and Austria.

In 1935 the Romanian Academy awarded him the Great Hamagiu Prize for his poems and plays. In the following year he was elected a titular member of the Romanian Academy and delivered the Elogiul satului românesc (In Praise of the Romanian Village) acceptance speech on 5 June 1937, in the attendance of Carol II. The choice for the topic was far from arbitrary: as tradition had it, every new member of the academy was chosen after the death of a titulary member and the newcome was expected to present a eulogy to the deceased. Since Blaga's position was created because the academy was expanding, he chose to eulogize what he called "our unanimous, anonymous ancestor". This was also an attempt to mend the relationship with Nicolae Iorga, once an admirer of Blaga's works, but who turned against it latter on, seeing it as corrupted by German influence, and campaigned against Blaga's nomination.

In 1938 he was appointed undersecretary of state in the Ministry of External Affairs in Goga cabinet, a position that he gained at the intervention of King Carol II, who was impressed with Blaga's speech for the academy, and Veturia Goga, Octavian Goga's wife and a second cousin of Blaga. Blaga disliked working in the state apparatus and was relieved when the cabinet was dismantled less than two months later. He was then assigned a position as a plenipotentiary minister to Portugal, and later as a senator of the Carol II's party National Renaissance Front. In the same year he finally obtained a seat at King Ferdinand I University, becoming a professor of cultural philosophy, a cathedra created for him. Despite his positions held in the state he was critical of the political views on the rise before and during World War II Romania:

"we witness the disgraceful and lumbering phenomenon that we call “racist messianism.” This phenomenon entails the glorification of the physical and spiritual values of a single race. Racist messianism is characterized by the belief that one specific human race possesses all the qualities that God intended to bestow upon humankind, and that all the other races share these qualities only partially or in a distorted or perverted manner".

He temporarily relocated to Sibiu with the other staff in 1940 due to the Second Vienna Award. During his stay in Sibiu, in 1943, he became editor of the annual magazine Saeculum.

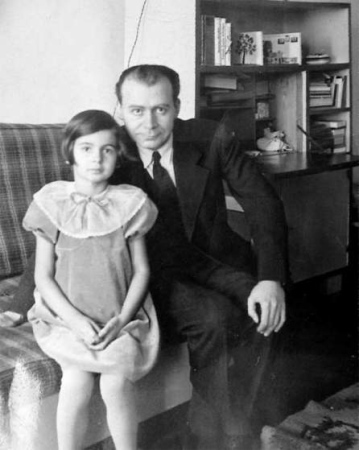
Blaga with his daughter

His long sought presence in top Romanian cultural institutions was to be short lived. Following the abdication of Carol II he came in conflict with the ideologists supporting the government (for example Dumitru Stăniloae) and in 1943, he was forced to defend his position in the academy. Then, in 1948, although he was briefly a member of the newly formed National Popular Party, having been for a while under heavy criticism from people of the system such as Lucrețiu Pătrășcanu and Mihai Beniuc, and accused, among other things, of being an acolyte of the former king of Romania Carol II, and that he praised Corneliu Zelea Codreanu in his Avram Iancu play, he was removed from the academy and public life by the Socialist Republic of Romania's authorities, losing his cathedra as well. He started working as a librarian at the Cluj branch of the History Institute of the Romanian Academy. Forbidden to publish any new books, he was forced to only translate until 1960. During this period he completed the translation of Goethe's Faust, one of the German writers that he claimed influenced him most.

He died on 6 May 1961 after being diagnosed with a spinal tumor, and was buried according to the custom three days later on what would have been his 66th birthday, in his native village cemetery of Lancrăm.

He was married to Cornelia (née Brediceanu). They had a daughter, Dorli, her name being derived from dor, a noun that can be translated, roughly, as "longing".

The University of Sibiu bears his name today.

== Philosophy ==
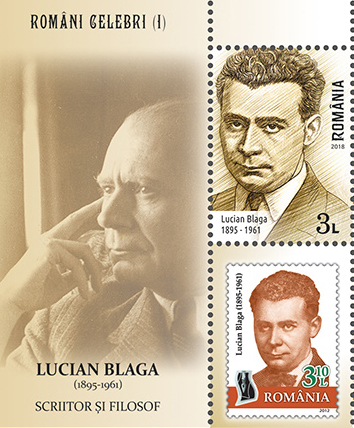
Blaga on a 2018 stamp sheet of Romania

Lucian Blaga's philosophical system was an expression of philosophy as "World view" (Weltanschauung), one he elaborated upon in four trilogies: The Trilogy of Knowledge (1943) consisting of The Dogmatic Aeon, The Luciferian Knowledge and The Transcendent Censorship; The Trilogy of Culture (1944): Horizon and Style, The Mioritic Space, and The Genesis of Metaphor and the Sense of Culture; The Trilogy of Values (1946): Science and Creation, Magical Thinking and Religion, Art and Value; and The Cosmological Trilogy: The Divine Differentials (1940), Anthropological Aspects, and Historical Existence. The categorization and arrangement of the works was an editorial testament of the author before his death. Additionally, some of his less expansive writings are cited along one or another Trilogy by scholars.

The novel Charon's Ferry is intended to be a companion to the philosophical trilogies. In it Blaga addresses some of the more problematic philosophical issues such as those pertaining to political, (para)psychological or occult phenomena, under the name of a fictive philosopher (Leonte Pătrașcu).

While systematic in exposition, Blaga's philosophy is interconnected with his artistic works and with art in general, sharing both terms and style, for example the development, definition, and naming of his fundamental modalities of knowledge, the Luciferian knowledge and the Paradisian knowledge, which are (only in broad lines) the mainstream philosophical concept-terms of intuitive knowledge and conceptual knowledge. This is an intentional direction set by the author who saw philosophy as closer to art than to science - in the sense of rejecting Positivism and embracing Constructivism as an avenue of understanding the world.

In terms of relation with other philosophers and philosophy currents, most often cited are Plato, Heraclitus, Plotinus, Sergei Bulgakov, Immanuel Kant, Oswald Spengler, Leibniz, Hegel, Leo Frobenius, Paul Tillich, Ludwig Klages, Carl Jung, Wilhelm Worringer, Alois Riegl, and the German Romantics. Parallels are also drawn to Friedrich Nietzsche, Henri Bergson, Spinoza, Mircea Eliade, and Martin Heidegger, among many others. However, Blaga's philosophy is invariably acclaimed as original.

== Literature ==
We shall remember once, too late,
This simple happening, so fine,
This very bench where we are seated,
Your burning temple next to mine.

From hazel stamens, cinders fall
White as the poplars that they land on,
Beginnings want to be fecund,
May gives itself with sweet abandon.

The pollen falls on both of us,
Small mountains made of golden ashes
It forms around us, and it falls
On our shoulders and our lashes.

It falls into our mouths when speaking,
On eyes, when we are mute with wonder
And there’s regret, but we don’t know
Why it would tear us both asunder.

We shall remember once, too late,
This simple happening, so fine,
This very bench where we are seated
Your burning temple next to mine.

In dreams, through longings, we can see—
All latent in the dust of gold
These forests that perhaps could be—
But that will never, ever, grow.

— Lucian Blaga - "May gives itself with sweet abandon"
December 1960

=== Poetry ===
- 1919 – Poems of Light (Poemele luminii)
- 1921 – The Prophet's Footsteps (Pașii profetului)
- 1924 – In the Great Passage (În marea trecere)
- 1929 – In Praise of Sleep (Laudă somnului)
- 1933 – At the Watershed (La cumpăna apelor)
- 1938 – At the Courtyard of Yearning (La curțile dorului)
- 1942 - Iron age (Varsta de fier)
- 1943 – Unsuspected Steps (Nebănuitele trepte)
- 1982 – 3 Posthumous Poems

=== Drama ===
- 1921 – Zalmoxis, a Pagan Mystery
- 1923 – Whirling Waters
- 1925 – Daria, The Deed, Resurrection
- 1927 – Manole the Craftsman (Mesterul Manole)
- 1930 – The Children's Crusade
- 1934 – Avram Iancu
- 1944 – Noah's Ark
- 1964 – Anton Pann – published posthumously.

=== Philosophical works ===
- 1924 - "The Philosophy of Style"
- 1925 - "The Original Phenomenon" and "The Facets of a Century"
- 1931 - "The Dogmatic Aeon"
- 1933 - "Luciferian Knowledge"
- 1934 - "Transcendental Censorship"
- 1936 – "Horizon and Style" and "The Mioritic Space"
- 1937 – "The Genesis of Metaphor and the Meaning of Culture"
- 1939 – "Art and Value"
- 1940 – "The Divine Differentials"
- 1942 – "Religion and Spirit" and "Science and Creation"
- 1943 – The Trilogy of Knowledge (The Dogmatic Aeon, Luciferian Knowledge, Transcendent Censorship; in 1983, On Philosophical Cognition and Experiment and the Mathematical Spirit was added posthumously according to his will)
- 1944 – The Trilogy of Culture (Horizon and Style, The Mioritic Space, The Genesis of Metaphor and the Meaning of Culture)
- 1946 – The Trilogy of Values (Science and Creation, Magical Thinking and Religion, Art and Value)
- 1959 – Historical Existence
- 1966 – Romanian Thought in Transylvania in the 18th Century
- 1968 – Horizons and Stages
- 1969 – Experiment and the Mathematical Spirit
- 1972 – Sources (essays, lectures, articles)
- 1974 – On Philosophical Cognition
- 1977 – Philosophical Essays
- 1983 – The Cosmological Trilogy (The Divine Differentials, Anthropological Aspects, Historical Existence)

=== Other works ===
- 1919 – Stones for My Temple, aphorisms
- 1945 – Discoblus, aphorisms
- 1965 – The Chronicle and Song of Ages, memoirs
- 1977 – The Élan of the Island, aphorisms
- 1990 – Charon's Ferry, novel

=== Presence in English language anthologies ===
- Born in Utopia - An anthology of Modern and Contemporary Romanian Poetry - Carmen Firan and Paul Doru Mugur (editors) with Edward Foster - Talisman House Publishers - 2006 - ISBN 1-58498-050-8
- Testament – Anthology of Modern Romanian Verse / Testament - Antologie de Poezie Română Modernă – Bilingual Edition English & Romanian – Daniel Ioniță (editor and translator) with Eva Foster, Daniel Reynaud and Rochelle Bews – Minerva Publishing 2012 and 2015 (second edition) - ISBN 978-973-21-1006-5
- Testament - Anthology of Romanian Verse - American Edition - monolingual English language edition - Daniel Ioniță (editor and principal translator) with Eva Foster, Daniel Reynaud and Rochelle Bews - Australian-Romanian Academy for Culture - 2017 - ISBN 978-0-9953502-0-5
- Testament - 400 Years of Romanian Poetry - 400 de ani de poezie românească - bilingual edition - Daniel Ioniță (editor and principal translator) with Daniel Reynaud, Adriana Paul & Eva Foster - Editura Minerva, 2019 - ISBN 978-973-21-1070-6\
- Romanian Poetry from its Origins to the Present - bilingual edition English/Romanian - Daniel Ioniță (editor and principal translator) with Daniel Reynaud, Adriana Paul and Eva Foster - Australian-Romanian Academy Publishing - 2020 - ISBN 978-0-9953502-8-1 ; LCCN - 2020907831

== Bibliography ==
- Blaga, Lucian (2012) [1965]. Dorli Blaga (ed.). Hronicul și cântecul vârstelor [The Chronicle and Song of the Ages] (in Romanian). Bucharest: Editura Humanitas.
- Gridan, Simona. "Aforismele lui Lucian Blaga - Relaţia cu proverbele româneşti". The Central and Eastern European Online Library, no volume given, no. 2 (2019), pp. 44–48.
- Todoran, Eugen (1985), Lucian Blaga, mitul dramatic, Timișoara: Facla.
- Mihăilescu, Dan C. (1984), Dramaturgia lui Lucian Blaga, Cluj: Editura Dacia.
- Pop, Ion (1981), Lucian Blaga – universul liric, Bucharest: Cartea Românească.
- Gană, George (1976), Opera literară a lui Lucian Blaga, Bucharest: Editura Minerva.
- Iţu, Mircia (1996), Indianismul lui Blaga, Braşov: Orientul latin ISBN 973-97590-1-7.
- Bălu, Ion (1986), Lucian Blaga, Bucharest: Editura Albatros.
- Micu, Dumitru (1967), Lirica lui Blaga, Bucharest: Editura pentru literatură.
- Iţu, Mircia (2007), Marele Anonim şi cenzura transcendentă la Blaga. Brahman şi māyā la Śaṅkara, in Caiete critice 6–7 (236–237), Bucharest, pages 75–83 ISSN 1220-6350.
- Todoran, Eugen (1981–1983), Lucian Blaga, mitul poetic, vol. I-II, Timișoara: Facla.
- Micu, Dumitru (1970), Estetica lui Lucian Blaga, Bucharest: Editura Științifică.
- Maciu, Andreea. MAN - OPENER OF MYSTERIES IN LUCIAN BLAGA'S POETRY. Globalization and Intercultural Dialogue: Multidisciplinary Perspectives, Section: Literature, pp. 237–242. (Abstract in English)
