= Biblioteca pentru toți =

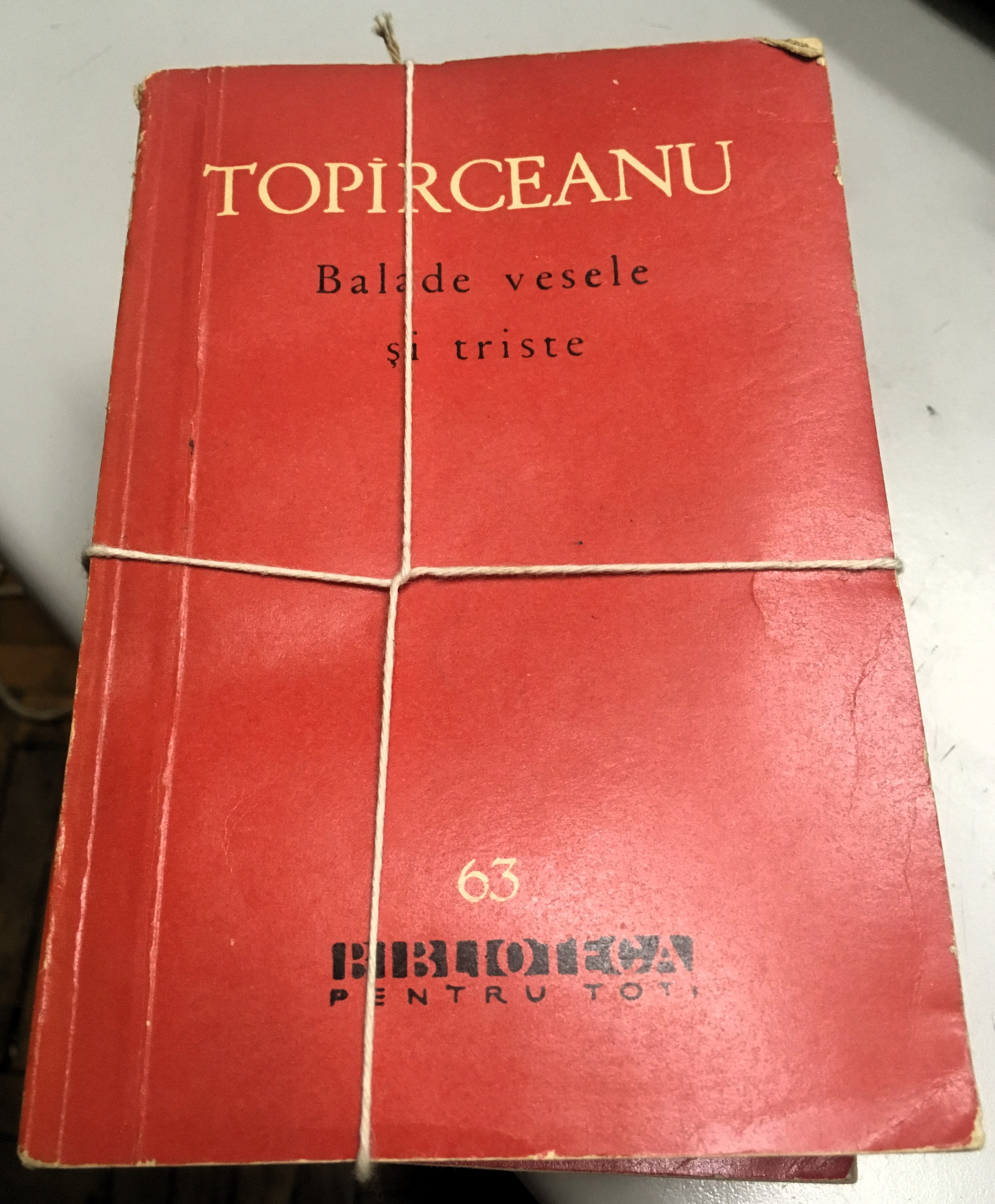
- Parent company: Leon Alcalay; Viața Românească (from 1920); Editura Socec (1942 – 1949); Editura „Cartea Rusă” (1950 – 1959); Editura pentru Literatură și Artă; Editurii de Stat pentru Literatură și Artă (ESPLA) (1959 – 1961); Editura pentru Literatură (1961 – 1970); Editura Minerva (1970 – 2001); Jurnalul Național (2009)
- Founded: 1895
- Founder: Carol Müller
- Country of origin: Romania
- Headquarters location: Bucharest
- Publication types: Books

Biblioteca pentru toți (BPT, Library For All) is a Romanian collection that was initiated by the writer and folklorist Dumitru Stăncescu and published from March 1, 1895, by the publisher Carol Müller, who was inspired by the German pocket collection Reclams Universal-Bibliothek from Leipzig.

== History ==
The first issue from 1895 included "Selected stories" by Hans Christian Andersen, translated in Romanian by Dumitru Stăncescu. 178 numbers were published. In 1900 the collection was sold to the Leon Alcalay Bookstore, Bucharest, which continued the numbering from 179.

From 1920, the collection came under the auspices of the "Viata Românească" publishing house, which continues to publish issues, and after 3 years reaches no. 1105.

In 1923 the collection was taken over by Iancu Şaraga and S. Schwartz. The new owners reprinted 1105 issues in revised editions. The new name of the publishing house is "UNIVERSALA" ALCALAY & Co. Bookstore, and the last collection number published by this publishing house, in 1940, is 1536.

In 1941, no volume was published. In 1942–1949, the collection was published by Socec Publishing House (Editura Socec).

From 1950 to 1959 it was published by Editura Cartea Rusă and Editura pentru Literatură și Artă, without collection numbers. Since 1960, again numbered from 1, the collection has been edited by Editura de Stat pentru Literatură și Artă (ESPLA); Editura pentru Literatură (EPL) and, from 1970 to 2001, by Editura Minerva.

In 1960, Mihai Șora was the founder of the new BPT series as editor-in-chief at the ESPLA.

1,700 numbered volumes that appeared in the collection between 1960 and 1970 (ESPLA and EPL) and 1970-2001 (Editura Minerva).

In March 2009, Marius Tucă from Jurnalul Național launched a collection of books under the brand name "Biblioteca pentru toți", comprising 100 titles, most written by Romanian authors.

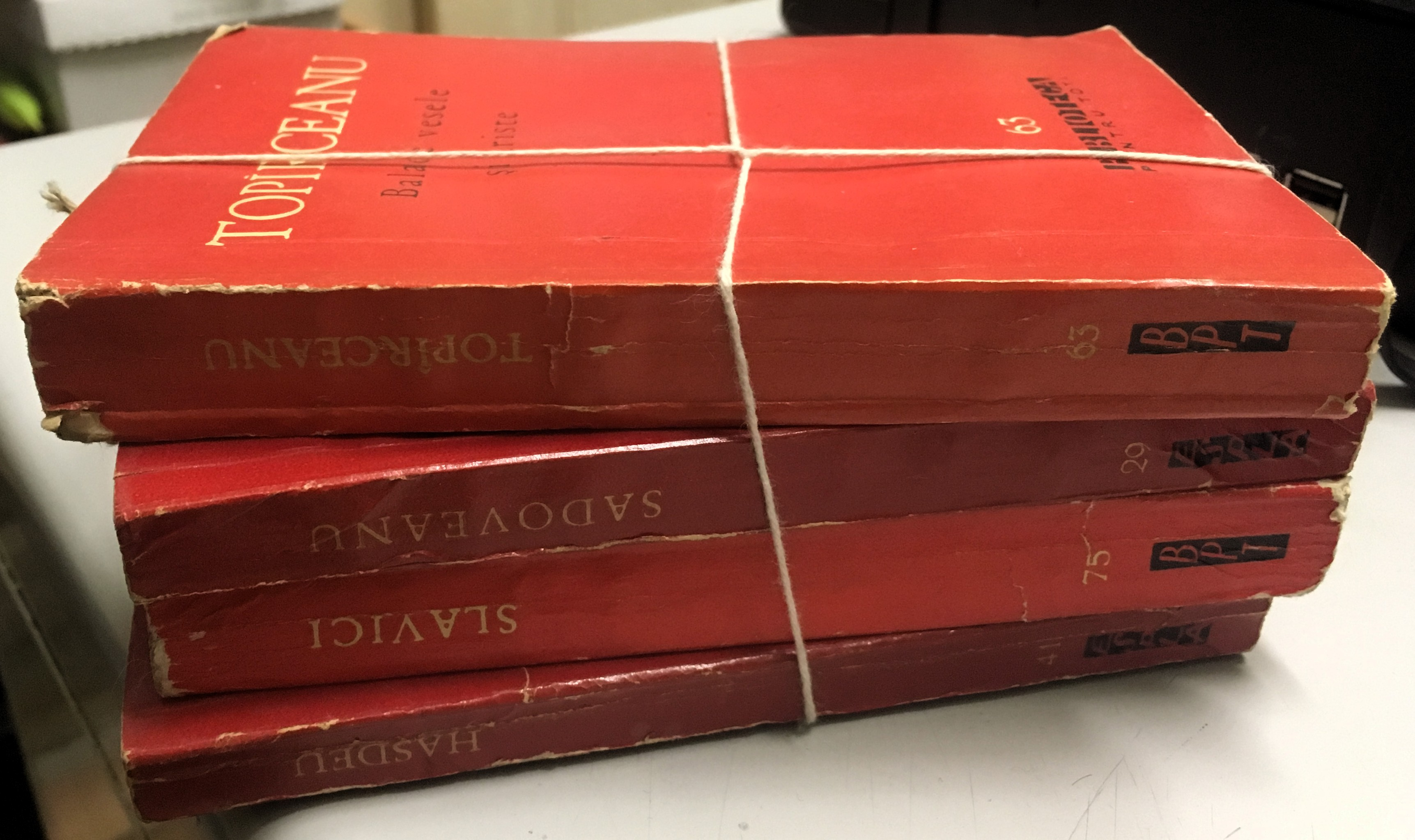

== 1960 – 1967 ==
Between January 1960 and August 1967, 400 issues were published with a total circulation of 24.625 million copies (the same number of copies were published in the period 1895–1949 in the same collection, but unnumbered). The first 400 numbers have approx. 140,000 book pages with works from 31 literatures - Romanian, African, South African, American, Arabic, Belgian, Bulgarian, Czech, Chinese, Danish, Swiss, English, Finnish, French, Georgian, German, Modern and Ancient Greek, Guatemalan, Yiddish, Indian, Icelandic, Italian, Latin, Hungarian, Norwegian, Persian, Polish, Russian, Serbian and Spanish.
