= Daniel Ioniță (poet) =

Australian poet and translator

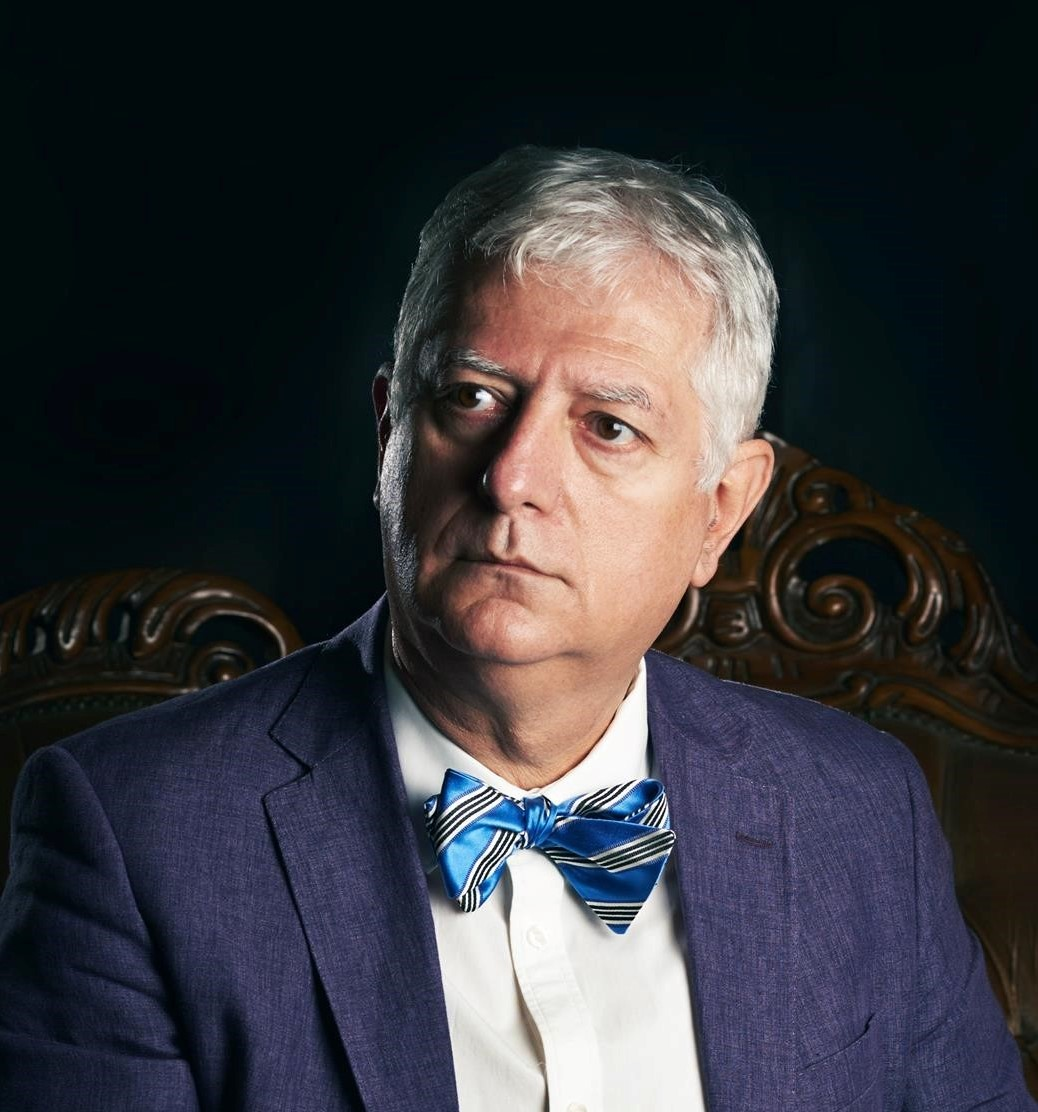
- Daniel Ioniță portrait by Etienne Reynaud
- Born: January 16, 1960 (age 66); Bucharest, Romanian People's Republic
- Education: C. A. Rosetti School, Bucharest; Dinicu Golescu National College, Câmpulung; Auckland University of Technology; Griffith University, Brisbane
- Occupations: Writer – poetry, translation
- Notable work: Testament - 400 Years of Romanian Poetry; "Romanian Poetry from its Origins to the Present"; "Short Bursts of Eternity"; "Return Ticket from Sydney to Bistrița - a Lyrical Carrousel between Antipodes"; Testament - Anthology of Romanian Verse - American Edition; Hanging Between the Stars; ContraDiction; The Bessarabia of My Soul; Insula Cuvintelor de Acasă; "Pentimento"

Daniel Ioniță (born 16 January 1960) is an Australian poet and translator of Romanian origin, who has been published bilingually in Australia, USA, and Romania. Ioniță is known for his writing, especially poetry and poetry in translation, as well as for his cultural activity leading the Australian-Romanian Academy for Culture.

== Early life ==
Daniel Ioniță was born in Bucharest, Romania on January 16, 1960. Ioniță's family left Romania in 1980, initially for Austria, before settling in New Zealand (from 1981 to 1988) and finally in Australia in 1989. An Honours graduate in Psychology from Griffith University in Brisbane, Ioniță made a career as a lecturer/senior presenter in Organisational Improvement & Excellence for Lean Six SIgma Business Excellence Institute (LSSBEI.COM) and the Business Practice Unit of the University of Technology Sydney.

== Writings ==
=== Poetry collections - anthologies ===
Initially Ioniță became known for his bilingual (English/Romanian) anthology of Romanian poetry titled Testament – Anthology of Modern Romanian Verse, published by Minerva Publishing House. The first edition (Bucharest 2012) covered 50 poets; the second edition (2015) expanded the scope of the anthology to 93 poets. These volumes span 160 years of Romanian poetry (from about 1850 to the present), translated to English with the assistance of English linguists and literature specialists Eva Foster, Daniel Reynaud, and Rochelle Bews. The anthology includes the best-known Romanian poets, as well as some emergent, less-recognized ones.

An even larger edition, covering 120 poets, of Testament – Anthology of Romanian Verse (having dropped the word "modern" from the title), presented only in English, was released in the United States in March 2017, with the support of the Australian Romanian Academy of Culture and the Romanian Cultural Institute, which organized its New York book launch.

In 2018, together with Maria Tonu (from Toronto, Canada), and with the support of Eva Foster, Daniel Reynaud, and Rochelle Bews, Ioniță also edited and translated the volume The Bessarabia of My Soul, which is a collection of poetry from the Republic of Moldova (MediaTon, 2018). Like Testament, this is a bilingual edition in English and Romanian, and represents some 40 Bessarabian poets starting with Alecu Russo and Alexei Mateevici, and including contemporaries such as Grigore Vieru, Leonida Lari, Leo Butnaru and others. Also notable is the presence in this volume of poems by Mihai Eminescu, who is claimed as the national poet by both Romania and the Republic of Moldova. Both the volume and the event have been chronicled at length by Ion Cuzuioc in publications in Moldova and Romania. Literary critic and historian Alex Ștefănescu wrote a review published in Literary Confluences describing the endeavour as a union between competence and good taste (no.2784 from 15 August 2018).

=== Testament - 400 Years of Romanian Poetry (2019) and Romanian Poetry from its Origins to the Present (2020) ===
This anthology creation and translation work culminated with two massive and somewhat parallel works. In November 2019, Minerva Publishing brought out the bilingual volume Testament - 400 Years of Romanian Poetry - 400 de ani de poezie românească, Ioniță being again the editor and principal translator, assisted this time by Daniel Reynaud, Adriana Paul, and Eva Foster.

Different to previous editions, this volume presents critical-biographical notes for every poet included. The preface is penned by literary critic and historian Alex Ștefănescu, while Australian poet and editor Martin Langford, director of Australian Poetry Inc. has written a postscript.

Occupying over 1150 pages each, it presents something new by comparison to other translation attempts. It covers the whole spectrum of published Romanian poetry, from early anonymous poetry (The "Miorița" ballad and others), the "Metropolitan Dosoftei" (17th century), and many other poets before the classical era. As with previous editions, it continue to present both classical and contemporary poetry, although providing a greatly expanded coverage - some 400 poets, compared to 50-100 poets in the previous editions.

For this volume, Ioniță was awarded the "Antoaneta Ralian" Prize for Translation from Romanian into a foreign language - of the Gaudeamus Book Fair - Bucharest 2019.

A parallel volume, almost identical in content, was published in mid 2020 in Australia and the United States by the Australian-Romanian Academy Publishing. The major difference is the cover, a few minor inside additions, and having Martin Langford as the principal preface/foreword author. This volume is slightly larger, now 1186 pages, titled Romanian Poetry from its Origins to the Present /Poezia românească de la origini și până în prezent, and seems based on the same structure and philosophy of Testament - 400 Years of Romanian Poetry. It appears that Testament - 400 Years of Romanian Poetry is published by Minerva Publishing in Romania only, while Romanian Poetry from its Origins to the Present is published and distributed by Australian-Romanian Academy Publishing in the rest of the world.

=== Daniel Ioniță's own poetry ===
Daniel Ioniță has also been published as a poet in his own right, with two bilingual volumes in English and Romanian, Hanging Between the Stars (Minerva Publishing House, 2013) and ContraDiction (Pim Publishing, 2016), as well as two Romanian-only volumes Insula Cuvintelor de Acasă – The Island of Words from Home (Limes Publishing, 2017) and Instructțiuni - Instructions (with ROCART Publishing, in Bucharest, 2020). In 2021 the volume Short Bursts of Eternity is published by Flying Islands in Australia.

His poetry has been generally well-received by literary critics: Constantin Cubleșan wrote that it is "difficult to pigeonhole... conversant across a number of styles... a confronting lyrical tone... a poet with no hang-ups, unlike many other contemporary ones"; Ștefan Ion Ghilimescu^{B} described it as having "a trenchant manner, very direct linguistic approach and high expressivity"; and Lucian Vasilescu observed that, "although he left Romania a long time ago, Daniel Ioniță [poetically] inhabits the Romanian language". Reviewers have positively compared various parts of his work with both earlier poets like Tudor Arghezi or Geo Dumitrescu, as well as more recent poets such as Marin Sorescu. They have also commented on the deep irony and especially self-irony of some of the poems. Ghilimescu, particularly, considers this ironic tone as being somewhat defining of the poet. Cubleșan objects to some of Daniel Ioniță's more bawdy poems, but notes them as counterbalanced by the spiritually inspired ones. The spiritual poems were also regarded favourably by Ghilimescu, who suggested possible resonances from Nietzsche and Dostoevsky. Meanwhile, Alex Ștefănescu notes in his Postscript to the volume Hanging Between the Stars: "...and now Daniel Ioniță publishes his own volume of verse, possessed by a pleasure of writing which is a rare commodity to the blasé writers of today. In fact, this Romanian from Australia rediscovers poetry, employing picturesque words like Nichita Stanescu, or transforming metaphor as a means of discovering the world, like Blaga. He does all this without imitating anyone, rather reinventing lyrical performance – with exuberance and freshness". In 2016 and in 2018, Daniel Ioniță's poems were included into a biennial anthology series of contemporary Australian poetry, All These Presences and On first looking, published by Puncher & Wattmann from Sydney, Australia. This series, initiated by Dr. Carolyn Rickett of Avondale College of Tertiary Studies in New South Wales, Australia, blends the work of established poets (e.g. Jean Kent, Judith Beveridge, Martin Langford, David Musgrave, Judy Johnson, Kit Kelen, Linda Ireland, Stephen Edgar) with emergent talent.

Ioniță's first full published volume in Australia, Short Bursts of Eternity (Flying Islands, 2020), has been described by poet Jean Kent as "often enigmatic and paradoxical... The poems have a forthright energy and openness, a flair for drama and a desire to connect as well as to entertain...The imagery may be appealingly whimsical, but this is not going to be simple poetry which will make its meaning instantly clear. A flexible way of reading is required – preferably (perhaps?) with a sense of humour and a willingness to respond intuitively to both the charm and the inherent contrariness....The struggle to retain a sense of self – a dignified personal life in a hostile world – is a recurring theme. Surreal re-imaginings of existence offer an alternative vivacity: saving the world by shaving a hedgehog, sitting on a hedgehog … or obeying the instructions of the Communist party … When all the world is absurd, it makes sense to respond with behaviour – or poetic accounts of possible behaviour – which is even more bizarre... These are haunting, disturbing poems. They are also a timely reminder that freedom to live is not to be taken for granted." Somewhat similar sentiments are expressed by Magdalena Ball in her review of Ioniță's following Australian volume, Pentimento: "The poems in Daniel Ionita’s latest collection, Pentimento, are full of theatre, irony, absurdity and a kind of joy in the strangess of life... Though occasionally confronting, Pentimento is a charming, inventive, smart and slightly audacious collection that will delight all but the most squeamish readers." On the same volume, Gemma White remarks: "In reading Daniel Ionita's Pentimento for the first time, I was reminded of Rabelais and His World by Mikhail Bakhtin. ...the concept of the carnival 'celebrated temporary liberation from the prevailing truth and from the established order; it marked the suspension of all hierarchical rank, privileges, norms, and prohibitions. Carnival was the true feast of time, the feast of becoming, change and renewal' (Bakhtin 1984, p.10). In a similar way, Ionita’s work seems to make everything topsy-turvy in a feat of absurdist humour, so that through poking a stick at everything, including himself, perhaps offers some relief from the anxieties of our present time."

=== Critical reactions to Testament – Anthology of Romanian Verse ===
Testament - Anthology of Modern Romanian Verse (the title was changed to the more general Testament - Anthology of Romanian Verse by the time it reached the more recent American Edition) generated polarized reactions.

The controversy arose mostly from the perspective of literary politics, regarding the choice of poets and poems and therefore how representative the anthology was of Romanian poetry. A fair number of critics were very positive, including Alex Ștefănescu ("Testament – Anthology of Modern Romanian Verse represents the pantheon of Romanian poetry"... "no important Romanian poet is missing" and "I keep Daniel Ioniță's anthology on my desk [as reference]"), Lucian Vasilescu ("The work of the author of Testament is a rare one, if not unique even, thrilling and worthy of reverence"), Radu Voinescu ("one cannot contest the coherence of this volume"; "after the success of the first edition [Daniel Ioniță's] anthology has all the hallmarks necessary to successfully represent Romanian culture to a level which we have all desired, for a very long time"); Florin Ionescu, referring to the second edition - "the current volume represents a true panorama of the poetic diversity of Romanian literature"; finally Melania Cuc – "Through the clear and professional approach, with exceptional dexterity in the use and linkage of syntagma, the poet-translator Daniel Ioniță manages to bring to the light of print, and take to the world, a book of true value for us as a nation."

The opposition to the anthology was almost equally vehement, and came from two sources. One was Corneliu Vadim Tudor, who wrote a blog article entitled "Ugly book! Smacks to whoever wrote you!". Vadim Tudor, a Romanian poet and politician, objected to the omission of poets such as Andrei Mureșanu (author of the verses to Deșteaptă-te, române!, the Romanian national anthem), Nichifor Crainic, and others. The second one is a similarly scathing article by Răzvan Voncu, who also objects to the inclusion of certain poets over others ("A ridiculous anthology"). He objects to the absence of some poets such as Geo Dumitrescu, Dinu Flamand, and A.E.Baconski, as well as the presence of authors such as Nicolae Tzone or Adi Cusin (incidentally all these poets were included in subsequent editions such as Romanian Poetry from its Origins to the Present and Testament - 400 Years of Romanian Poetry). Voncu also disagrees with the chronological presentation of the poets in the volume. The quality of translation itself appears to be a secondary concern among these reviews, although Razvan Voncu, surprisingly and without any substantiation, asserts that "Daniel Ioniță is not a translator...".

Contrary to this view, Horia Gârbea, a noted literary critic and experienced translator from and into the English language, in reviewing Testament 400 Years of Romanian Poetry, asserts that Daniel Ioniță and his team have displayed "a remarkable faithfulness" in their translations, that they are " particularly gifted and skilled" at this. Also, one English-speaking reviewer surmised that "...[Testament] transfers well a voice which is distinctly Romanian into English, making it possible for the Romanian accent to be heard in our [English] language... This volume represents a window into Romania's soul." In addition, two notable literary critics, Pavel Perfil and Alex Ștefănescu describe the book-launch of Testament in Australia as an exceptional opportunity to represent Romanian poetry outside Romania. Both single out specifically the recital by actor Tug Dumbly of a poem from it (Eminescu's "Glossa") in the Parliament of New South Wales in Sydney on the occasion of Romania's national Day (1 December 2012). In his extensive critical review of Mihai Eminescu's work, Ștefănescu renders the whole of Eminescu's Gloss in the English version from Testament, as a demonstration to his readers that this technically difficult work can be successfully transferred into English.

== Cultural influence ==
Perhaps because of these differing views, Ioniță has received a considerable amount of exposure in the media, with various television channels (TVR, SperantaTV, TVR International, TVR Transilvania, Cotidianul TV, Nașul-TV among others) and radio stations (Radio Romania Actualități, SmartFM in Romania, the ABC and SBS radio stations in Australia, ARCA TV from the US) broadcasting about his work, and interviewing on a regular basis when he visits Romania. This exposure increased significantly after the formation, in 2014, of the Australian-Romanian Academy for Culture, a body promoting specific cultural cooperation projects involving artists, writers and academics from Australia and Romania. Ioniță's work has also been translated into other media: singers-songwriters Cătălin Condurache, Sandy Deac, and Adrian Ivanițchi have written and performed songs on some of Ioniță's more romantic poems.

Starting with 2023, and continuing yearly - the Australian-Romanian Academy for Culture and Poetry Sydney have co-organised an "Mihai Eminescu Poetry Festival" in Sydney - for which Daniel Ioniță provided curated themes from significant Eminescu poems, eliciting poetic responses from invited Australian poets, as well as a few poets of Romanian origin living in Australia. This poetic dialogue culminated in January 2026 with the publication of the bilingual volume The Universal Within the Local - An Australian-Romanian Poetic Dialogue with Mihai Eminescu 2023-2025 - with Ioniță as principal editor, and with Angela Stretch (president of Poetry Sydney) and George Roca (publicist and editor) as consulting editors.

== Published works ==
- 2012 - 2015 - Testament – Anthology of Modern Romanian Verse / Testament - Antologie de Poezie Română Modernă, bilingual version (English/Romanian) – Minerva Publishing, 2012, second edition 2015. Daniel Ioniță (editor and principal translator) with Eva Foster, Daniel Reynaud and Rochelle Bews. ISBN 978-973-21-1006-5
- 2013 - Hanging Between the Stars / Agățat Între Stele - debut volume of his own poetry bilingual English/Romanian – Minerva Publishing - ISBN 978-973-21-1000-3
- 2016 - ContraDiction / ContraDicție – poetry - bilingual Romanian / English - PIM Publishing 2016 - Bibliotheca Universalis Collection - ISBN 978-606-13-3840-5
- 2017 - Testament – Anthology of Romanian Verse - American Edition - monolingual English version - Daniel Ioniță (editor and principal translator) with Eva Foster, Daniel Reynaud and Rochelle Bews - Australian-Romanian Academy for Culture -2017. 120 poets, including some significant Romanian poets who settled in USA and Canada - ISBN 978-0-9953502-0-5
- 2017 - The Island of Words from Home (Insula Cuvintelor de Acasă), poetry volume in Romanian - Limes Publishing - ISBN 978-606-799-094-2
- 2018 -The Bessarabia of My Soul / Basarabia sufletului meu – a collection of poetry from the Republic of Moldova - bilingual English/Romanian – Daniel Ioniță and Maria Tonu (editors) - with Eva Foster, Daniel Reynaud and Rochelle Bews - MediaTon, Toronto, supported by the Australian-Romanian Academy for Culture - ISBN 978-1-7751837-9-2
- 2019 -Testament - 400 Years of Romanian Poetry/400 de ani de poezie românească - Minerva Publishing 2019 - Daniel Ioniță (editor and principal translator) assisted by Daniel Reynaud, Adriana Paul and Eva Foster. ISBN 978-973-21-1070-6
- 2020 - Romanian Poetry from its Origins to the Present - bilingual edition - Daniel Ioniță (editor and principal translator) with Daniel Reynaud, Adriana Paul and Eva Foster - Australian-Romanian Academy Publishing - 2020 - ISBN 978-0-9953502-8-1 ; LCCN: 2020907831
- 2020 - Instrucțiuni (Instructions) - poetry volume in Romanian - ROCART Publishing, Bucharest - ISBN 978-606-95092-0-3
- 2021 - Return Ticket from Sydney to Bistrița - A Lyrical Carousel between the Antipodes - bilingual English/Romanian - Daniel Ioniță, Adriana Paul, Dorel Cosma, Zorin Diaconescu, Menuț Maximinian (editors) - Australian Romanian Academy Publishing - ISBN 978-0-9953502-6-7; LCCN - 2021907064
- 2021 - Short Bursts of Eternity - poems - Flying Island Books, Australia - ISBN 978-0-6452196-6-1
- 2022 - Pentimento - poems - Interactive Publications, Australia - ISBN 9781922332820
- 2026 - The Universal Within the Local - An Australian-Romanian Poetic Dialogue with Mihai Eminescu 2023-2025 - bilingual English/Romanian - Daniel Ioniță (principal editor and translator), with Angela Stretch and George Roca (consulting editors) - Australian-Romanian Academy Publishing - ISBN 978-1-7636344-4-2

== Presence in anthologies ==
- 2013 – Insomnii Mătăsoase / Silky Insomnias, edited by Stefania Grigorascu-Zanfir (Ed.PASTEL, Brasov) - ISBN 978-606-658-080-9
- 2014 – Lyrical Symbioses (Simbioze Lirice) – edited by Rodica Elena Lupu and George Roca (Anamarol, Bucharest) - ISBN 978-606-640-088-6
- 2015 – Testament – Anthology of Modern Romanian Verse (Minerva Publishing, Bucharest, second edition, bilingual English/Romanian) - ISBN 978-973-21-1006-5
- 2016 - All These Presences (Puncher & Wattmann, Sydney, Australia) - editors Jean Kent, David Musgrave and Carolyn Rickett - an anthology covering both recognised and emerging contemporary Australian Poets - ISBN 978-1-92218-692-8
- 2016 – Stellar Relief / Relief Stelar (Ed.Armonii Culturale, Bucharest) – a bilingual anthology of Romanian poets from the Romanian diaspora, edited by Maria Tonu.
- 2018 –The Bessarabia of My Soul / Basarabia sufletului meu – a collection of poetry from the Republic of Moldova - bilingual English/Romanian – Daniel Ioniță and Maria Tonu (editors) - with Eva Foster, Daniel Reynaud and Rochelle Bews - (MediaTon, Toronto, supported by the Australian-Romanian Academy for Culture). ISBN 978-1-7751837-9-2
- 2018 - On first looking - Puncher & Wattmann Sydney, Australia) - editors Jean Kent, David Musgrave and Carolyn Rickett - an anthology covering both recognised and emerging contemporary Australian Poets -ISBN 978-1-92578-034-5
- 2019 - Testament - 400 Years of Romanian Poetry/400 de ani de poezie românească - Minerva Publishing 2019 - Daniel Ioniță (editor and principal translator) assisted by Daniel Reynaud, Adriana Paul and Eva Foster. ISBN 978-973-21-1070-6
- 2020 - Romanian Poetry from its Origins to the Present - bilingual edition - Daniel Ioniță (editor and principal translator) with Daniel Reynaud, Adriana Paul and Eva Foster - Australian-Romanian Academy Publishing - 2020 - ISBN 978-0-9953502-8-1 ; LCCN - 2020907831
- 2021 - Return Ticket from Sydney to Bistrița - A Lyrical Carousel between the Antipodes - bilingual English/Romanian - Daniel Ioniță, Adriana Paul, Dorel Cosma, Zorin Diaconescu, Menuț Maximinian (editors) - Australian Romanian Academy Publishing - ISBN 978-0-9953502-6-7; LCCN - 2021907064

== Awards ==
- The Poetry Award for 2018, offered by the magazine Literatura și Arta (Literature and Art) - Chișinău - the Republic of Moldova
- The "Antoaneta Ralian" 2019 Prize for Translation from Romanian into a foreign language for the volume Testament - 400 Years of Romanian Poetry / Testament - 400 de ani de poezie românească - offered by the Gaudeamus Bookfair (Târgul de Carte Gaudeamus) - 2019
