= Editura Minerva =

Publishing house in Romania

- Industry: Editing
- Founded: 1898, closed 1945; re-established 1970
- Founder: Carol Müller
- Headquarters: Bucharest, Romania
- Key people: Ana Munteanu (editor in chief)
- Website: http://www.edituraminerva.ro/

Editura Minerva is one of the largest publishing houses in Romania. Located in Bucharest, it is known, among other things, for publishing classic Romanian literature, children's books, and scientific books.

The company was founded in Bucharest in 1898, but closed after World War II. It re-opened in 1970. It was privatized in 1999 and was bought by Megapress Holdings in 2002.

== Book series ==
- Biblioteca pentru toți
- Colectia Scriitori Români
- Seria Patrimoniu
