= Daniel Reynaud =

Australian historian

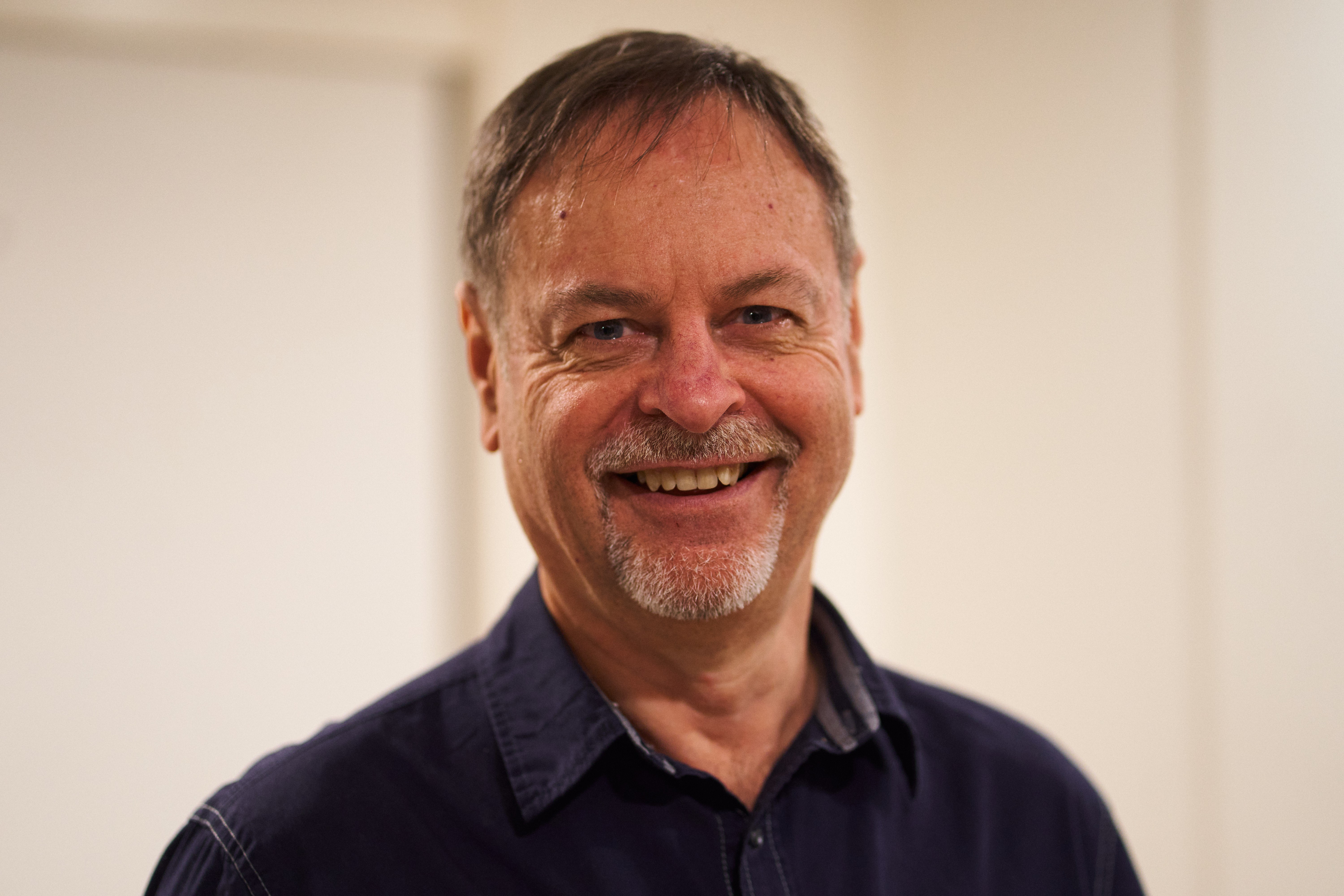
- Born: 27 August 1958 (age 68)
- Education: PhD in History - University of Newcastle
- Occupation: Historian
- Notable work: Celluloid Anzacs; The man the Anzacs revered; Anzac spirituality; The Anzac Table; Sailor, Soldier, Vicar, Farmer

Daniel Reynaud (born 27 August 1958) is an Australian historian whose work on Australian war cinema and on Australian World War I soldiers and religion has challenged aspects of the Anzac legend, Australia’s most important national mythology built around the role of Australian servicemen, popularly known as Anzacs.

== Early life and secondary teaching career ==
Reynaud was born in Armidale, New South Wales in 1958 shortly after his parents emigrated from France. His father Jean (John) Reynaud was for some years a Lecturer in French at Avondale College from which Daniel Reynaud obtained his teaching degree in History and English in 1979. He taught secondary History and English at Longburn Adventist College, Auckland Adventist High School and Rosmini College between 1980–1991.

== Tertiary career ==
In 1992, Reynaud began lecturing at Avondale University in the field of media and English. In 2003, he shifted his teaching focus primarily to history. He was a founding Associate Professor of Avondale when the rank was introduced in 2009, in the same year winning an Australian Learning & Teaching Council Citation for Outstanding Contributions to Student Learning, particularly for his innovative use of tabletop wargaming to teach the World Wars at university level. He was appointed Dean of the Faculty of Arts in 2010, and of the Faculty of Arts & Theology in 2011, a position he retained until 2013. In 2017, he was Visiting Professor at Southern Adventist University in Chattanooga, Tennessee in the United States. He was promoted to Professor in 2019, and made Emeritus Professor upon retiring in 2023.

== Film and television historical research ==
Reynaud’s interest in film was sparked by his film director brother Gabe Reynaud (1953–2000), who made a series of influential documentary series for Adventist Media, including Keepers of the Flame, Chasing Utopia and The Search. Daniel Reynaud’s doctoral thesis from the University of Newcastle in 1997 was titled Celluloid Anzacs: representations of the Great War in Australian Cinema and Television Dramas. It was later published as Celluloid Anzacs: The Great War through Australian Cinema (Australian Scholarly Publishing, 2007). It explored over 40 representations of World War One in Australian film and television productions.

In the course of his research, Reynaud rediscovered several lost or partially lost Australian silent films on World War I. The most significant of these films was The Hero of the Dardanelles (1915), Australia’s first Gallipoli Campaign movie. The film was made during the campaign and was a huge commercial and critical success. Reynaud’s research uncovered lost footage, movie stills and the original screenplay, and he oversaw a reconstruction of the film which was released by the National Film and Sound Archive (NFSA) in 2015, the centenary of its original release. It is the second-oldest commercially available Australian silent film.

Other films unearthed during Reynaud's research include a British compilation film, For the Honour of Australia, which worked together two Australian films about the Sydney-Emden battle of December 1914, For Australia (1915) and How We Beat the Emden (1915). The film, now available at the NFSA, preserves footage of the wrecked SMS Emden after the Battle of Cocos, filmed for a feature documentary in 1915. The last film was the 1928 production The Exploits of the Emden, which Reynaud re-edited together after it had been split into two films.

Reynaud has published extensively on Anzac cinema, showing how the representation of the Great War has shifted over time to reflect national interests and concerns, helping to buttress popular perceptions of the Anzac legacy. Representations have changed over time, particularly in showing the ideal Australian soldier, who has transformed from a well-to-do city boy in many World War I movies to a larrikin but good-hearted boy from the bush in films from the 1930s onwards. Similarly, the representation of the British in Australian war films has shifted from the idealized man of the World War I years to the antithesis of the noble bushman Anzac, a shift that began in the 1970s.

== Anzacs and religion ==
Reynaud’s second principal area of research is challenging the myth of the universal secularity of the Anzacs. Several major monographs to date reveal that religion was an important factor in the lives of a large minority of soldiers. The Man the Anzacs Revered (Signs Publishing, 2015) is a biography of legendary Anzac chaplain William ‘Fighting Mac’ McKenzie, arguably the most popular soldier of the Australian Imperial Force and yet largely unknown today. Another work, Anzac Spirituality (Australian Scholarly Publishing, 2018) explores soldierly attitudes to a range of formal and informal religious and spiritual issues, drawn from the reading of the diaries and letters of about a thousand Anzacs. The book has been described as ‘a genuinely world-ranking book’,. A biography of Australia's most decorated chaplain, Walter Dexter, gives an account of his extraordinarily diverse life and adventures. Reynaud's work in the area of Anzac religion has been labelled ‘an exceptional gift to Australia and to our understanding of our history.’

Reynaud has also written and appeared in eight documentaries about the Anzacs and religion. One, //Faith of the Anzacs//, screened on Channel 7 on Anzac Day 2010, setting new records for audience response for Adventist Media Network, and winning American and Australian media awards. Another, on Fighting Mac McKenzie, also rated well.

== Other work ==
As a sideline to his research in Anzac spirituality, he published in collaboration with his wife Emanuela The Anzac Table, a study of the diverse dining experiences of the Australian forces during World War One. The volume forms part of the Australian Army History Unit's official publications. It won the Anzac Memorial Trustees Military History Prize at the NSW History Awards in 2026.

Reynaud has been involved in various other research projects, including on online learning and Romanian poetry translation. He has won awards for his academic and popular writing, as well as sharing awards as part of a team in poetry translation. He has also recorded three albums of original music.

== Select bibliography ==
=== Books ===
- Reynaud, Daniel. Media Values: Christian perspectives on the mass media. Cooranbong NSW: Avondale Academic Press, 1999
- ---. Reading With New Eyes: Exploring scripture through literary genre. Cooranbong, NSW: Avondale Academic Press, 2000
- ---. The Hero of the Dardanelles and other World War I Silent Dramas. Canberra: National Film and Sound Archive Monographs, 2005
- ---. Celluloid Anzacs: The Great War through Australian Cinema. Melbourne: Australian Scholarly Publishing, 2007
- ---. The Man the Anzacs Revered: William ‘Fighting Mac’ McKenzie, Anzac Chaplain. Warburton Vic: Signs Publishing, 2015
- ---. Anzac Spirituality: The First AIF Soldiers Speak, Melbourne: Australian Scholarly Publishing, 2018
- ---. The Anzacs, Religion and God: The spiritual journeys of twenty-seven members of the AIF, North Melbourne: Australian Scholarly, 2019
- ---. Sailor, Soldier, Vicar, Farmer: The Improbable Life of Anzac Chaplain Walter Dexter. Warburton, Vic: Signs Publishing 2026
- Reynaud, Daniel & Kent, Gary. Faith of the Anzacs. Sydney: It Is Written Oceania/Adventist Media Network, 2010
- Ioniță, Daniel, Foster, Eva, Reynaud, Daniel and Bews, Rochelle. Testament: Anthology of Romanian Verse/Antologie de Poezie Română Modernă. Editura Minerva, Bucharest, 2015. Bilingual anthology
- Ioniță, Daniel, Tonu, Maria, Foster, Eva, Reynaud, Daniel and Bews, Rochelle, The Bessarabia of My Soul: a collection of poetry from the Republic of Moldova/Basarabia Sufletului Meu: o colecţie de poezie din Republica Moldova, Toronto Canada: Editura MediaTon, 2018. Bilingual anthology
- Ioniță, Daniel, Reynaud, Daniel, Paul, Adriana, and Foster, Eva, Româneasă/ 400 Years of Romanian Poetry. Editura Minerva, Bucharest, 2019. Bilingual anthology. Winner of the 2019 Antoaneta Ralian Prize for best translation from Romanian to another language.
- Reynaud, Daniel and Howie, Ian, Jesus, not Beasts: Reading Revelation for Who Matters Most, Warburton, Vic: Signs Publishing, 2024
- Reynaud, Daniel & Reynaud, Emanuela, The Anzac Table: Food and Drink in the First Australian Imperial Force 1914–1918. Melbourne: Hardie Grant, 2026

=== Book chapters ===
- Reynaud, Daniel. ‘Australian Cinema and the War Effort,’ in Our Selection On Writings on Cinema’s Histories: Selected papers from the 7th Australian History and Film Conference, National Film and Sound Archive and ANU, Canberra 30 November — 2 December 1995. Edited by Jeff Doyle, Bill van der Heide and Susan Cowan, Canberra: NFSA/ADFA, 1998
- ---.‘Constructing the Anzac Image: A study of Australia’s first three Gallipoli movies 1915–16,’ in Marilyn Dooley (ed.). Credits Rolling: Selected papers, 12th Biennial Conference of the Film and History Association of Australia and New Zealand. Canberra: National Film and Sound Archive, 2005
- ---. ‘Film and National Mythology: The Anzac legend in Australian films,’ in Creative Nation: Australian cinema and cultural studies reader. Edited by Amit Sarwal and Reema Sarwal. New Delhi: SSS Publications, 2009
- ---. ‘War Cinema,’ in Directory of World Cinema, Vol 3, Australia and New Zealand. Edited by Ben Goldsmith and Geoff Lealand. Bristol & Chicago: Intellect Press & University of Chicago Press, 2010
- ---. ‘War and Society: Introduction,’ in Making Film and Television Histories: Australia and New Zealand. Edited by James E. Bennett and Rebecca Beirne. London, New York: I. B. Tauris, 2011
- ---. ‘Gallipoli,’ in Making Film and Television Histories: Australia and New Zealand. Edited by James E. Bennett and Rebecca Beirne. London, New York: I. B. Tauris, 2011
- ---. ‘A Christian Aesthetics for the Arts: Creativity and Theology,’ in Manifest: Our Call to Faithful Creativity. Edited by Nathan Brown and Joanna Darby. Warburton Vic: Signs Publishing, 2013
- ---. ‘The Enigma of Jesus in the Gospel of John,’ in Signs to Life: Reading and responding to John’s Gospel. Kendra Haloviak Valentine, with Carolyn Rickett, Daniel Reynaud, Jane Fernandez and Nathan Brown. Warburton Vic: Signs Publishing, 2013
- ---. ‘National Versions of the Great War: Modern Australian Anzac Cinema.’ In Martin Löschnigg and Marzena Sokołowska-Paryż, The Great War in Post-Memory Literature and Film. Berlin & Boston: Walter de Gruyter, 2014
- ---. ‘Redefining the Enemy in Contemporary Australian Anzac Cinema,’ in Martin Löschnigg and Marzena Sokołowska-Paryż, The Enemy in Contemporary Film, Berlin, De Gruyter, 2018
- Reynaud, Daniel & Fernandez, Jane. ‘“To Thrash the Offending Adam out of Them”: The theology of violence in the writings of Great War Anzacs,’ in Secularisation: New Historical Perspectives. Edited by Christopher Hartney. Cambridge: Cambridge Scholars Publishing, 2014
- Fitzsimmons, Phil & Reynaud, Daniel. ‘Comics/Graphic Novels/Bandes Dessinées and the Representation of the Great War.’ In Martin Löschnigg and Marzena Sokołowska-Paryż, The Great War in Post-Memory Literature and Film. Berlin & Boston: Walter de Gruyter, 2014
- Reynaud, Daniel and Miler, Larisa, ‘Australian Chaplains at Gallipoli: Role, Impact and Influence,’ in M. Mehdi Ilhan, Mehmet Bulut, and Ibrahim G. Yumuşak (eds.), Çanakkale 1915, Tarih, Ekonomi, Edebiyat ve Sanat/ Gallipoli 1915: History, Economy, Literature and Art, Istanbul: Istanbul Sabahattin Zaim Üniversitesi, 2017
- Reynaud, Daniel. ‘Redefining the Enemy in Contemporary Australian Anzac Cinema,’ in Martin Löschnigg and Marzena Sokołowska-Paryż (eds.), The Enemy in Contemporary Film, Berlin, De Gruyter, 2018
- ---. ‘A Wider Angle: Australia’s War Films of the New Millenium,’ in Kelly McWilliam & Mark David Ryan (eds.), Australian Genre Film (New York & London: Routledge, 2021
