= Tașcu Gheorghiu =

Romanian writer and visual artist (1910–1981)

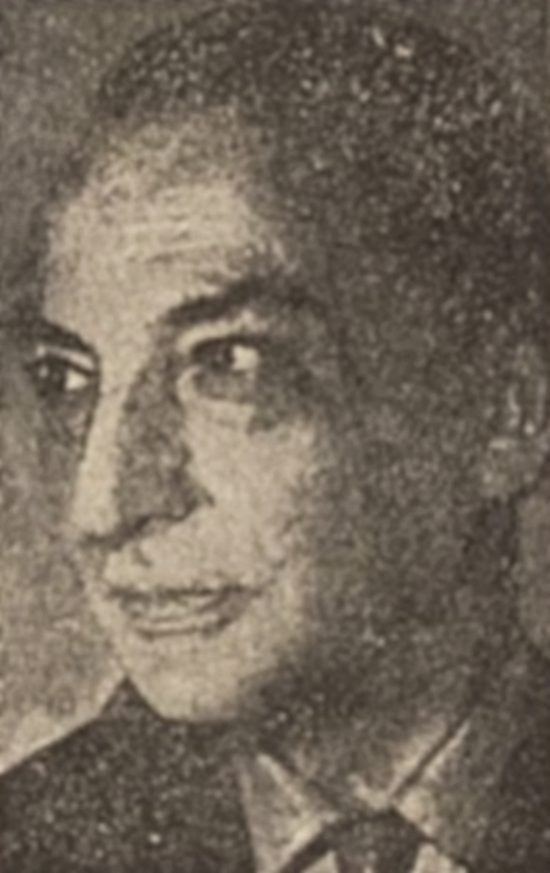
- Gheorghiu in 1970
- Born: 29 September 1910; Constanța, Kingdom of Romania
- Died: 17 October 1981 (aged 71); Bucharest, Socialist Republic of Romania
- Occupations: Critic, journalist, translator
- Writing career
- Period: c. 1932–1981
- Genres: Essay, opinion journalism, short story, lyric poetry
- Movements: Decadence; Surrealism

Tașcu Gheorghiu (29 September 1910 – 17 October 1981) was a Romanian writer and visual artist. The scion of an Aromanian-and-Greek family from Constanța, he had a secluded childhood and adolescence—practicing bohemianism and decadent art upon discovering Mateiu Caragiale as his lifelong literary inspiration. He integrated for a while with the Romanian avant-garde scene, publishing the short-lived magazine Liceu, where his colleagues included Virgil Teodorescu. Gheorghiu's accomplished short prose, heavily inspired by Urmuz, announced him as a major talent, but he quit literature abruptly within months of his debut; he stuck to Teodorescu's surrealist group in Bucharest, but only as an animator and illustrator, and, like some of the surrealists, also adopted leftist stances and collaborated with the outlawed Romanian Communist Party. Though improvident and hampered by his lifestyle choices, he eventually obtained a philosophy degree from the University of Bucharest.

Gheorghiu's politics swung to the right during the final stages of World War II, when he came to resent the Soviet occupation. The communist regime formed in 1948 allowed him to publish in its press, but official censors kept watch over his output, rightfully suspecting him of disloyalty. At the onset of de-Stalinization in the late 1950s, he was allowed to publish translations of non-political Western literature, including the forerunners of the decadent style, infusing them with his own stylistic choices—in turn shaped by Caragiale's distinct language. He contributed to the national corpus of Shakespearean translations, with the first-ever Romanian rendition of Pericles, Prince of Tyre (1962). Gheorghiu was also rendered famous by his take on Giuseppe Tomasi di Lampedusa's Leopard (1964). In tandem, he was also rediscovered as a draftsman, his sketches taken up by some of the leading Romanian magazines.

A hero to young bohemians of the 1960s, Gheorghiu maintained a highly unusual schedule, with days spent in restaurants and sleepless work-nights; his material excesses clashed with his poverty, as until 1970 he was confined to a one-room apartment with no plumbing. His fame was increased in the late 1970s, when he published complete illustrated versions of the Chants de Maldoror and the Season in Hell. He died shortly after his 71st birthday, just as his own avant-garde prose was being rediscovered and popularized by scholars of the movement. His translations continued to be published, as was his correspondence with Gelu Voican Voiculescu (the latter being for a while misidentified as surrealist Gellu Naum).

== Biography ==
=== Rebellious youth ===
Gheorghiu was born in Constanța on 29 September 1910. His parents were Aromanians, recently arrived as settlers from the Kingdom of Greece. Tașcu, who tended to describe himself in terms borrowed from Mateiu Caragiale, and as such bookish or self-aggrandizing, once indicated that his ethnic heritage was at least partly Greek, and claimed that his family had aristocratic tastes (if not also aristocratic origins). A novelist friend, Pericle Martinescu, similarly mentioned Tașcu's Hellenic origins, also recounting that his "more distant" relatives included a military man, Mihai Gheorghiu, whose father once owned Constanța's Regal Hotel.

By his own account, Tașcu was lonesome as a child, and inclined to daydream—blaming the Black Sea and Constanța's "harrowing beauty" for his disposition. The young man graduated from the local Mircea cel Bătrân High School, taking his Romanian baccalaureate in July 1929. At age sixteen, he had read Caragiale's breakthrough decadent novel, Craii de Curtea-Veche, and had been amazed by it. Going through the rest of his life as a Caragiale aficionado, he knew the text almost by heart; he only met the author once in his life, introduced to him by another novelist, Anton Holban. He was by then imitating the book's eccentric characters, and, before the age of twenty, was only rarely seen awake in daytime. The other heroes of his adolescence were the Comte de Lautréamont and a local poet-mathematician, Ion Barbu.

Gheorghiu's own literary and editorial debut was in 1932: alongside Virgil Teodorescu and Mircea Pavelescu, he published the Constanța magazine Liceu. It also featured his first stories, that he signed as "Șuly"; written in an avant-garde vein that showed strong influences from Urmuz's prose. The fragment called Unghi ("Angle") was later rediscovered by literary historian Matei Călinescu as a "strange and intense" masterpiece of the blossoming avant-garde movement. Young Gheorghiu enlisted at the University of Bucharest, where he was colleagues with Martinescu and scholar Ion Ureche, but continued to live in Constanța, at Principesa Ileana Boulevard 25, to at least 1935. During his studies, he also rented a one-room apartment Broșteanu Street, by Dorobanți. Only fitted with a wood-burning stove, with a squat toilet on the outside, it remained his only home in Bucharest for more than thirty years.

Gheorghiu had ended his engagement with "what they call literature" after Liceu's two-issues run, entering what Călinescu describes as a phase of "impenetrable and definitive silence." According to the same commentator, this was the ultimate evolution of artistic denialism, as practiced by the avant-garde, and a logical consequence of Urmuz's message; as such, Gheorghiu was "the most steadfast and self-reliant of our avant-garde writers". However, he still contributed to opinion journalism. A man of left-wing convictions, he collaborated with reportage pieces in Bucharest's Reporter for much of the 1930s. Like his friends Teodorescu and Paul Păun, he adopted programmatic surrealism, describing himself as a follower of André Breton's. However, he insisted that his surrealist contribution was mainly in the visual field, with a large number of drawings that he intentionally destroyed (though "some have escaped this fate"). His friend Constantin Olariu similarly reports that Gheorghiu's surrealist years were spent "doodling on the corners of some tables", revealing only him only as a "conformist cadger".

In March 1935, Gheorghiu signed up to a letter of protest by "the Christian students", demanding a clampdown on the antisemitic Iron Guard, and official protection for his Jewish colleagues; the list of signatures also included Teodorescu, Constanța Crăciun, Gellu Naum, and Miron Radu Paraschivescu. In May of the following year, he helped draft a protest against Constanța's authorities, after these had rounded up militants of the outlawed Romanian Communist Party (PCR or PCdR) and Dobrujan Revolutionary Organization. This activity drew attention from the far-right daily, Porunca Vremii, who laughed him off as a pseudo-intellectual and an agent of communist subversion, believing that his only diploma was with the Commercial Academy. Around then, Teodorescu and Gheorghiu had become occasional contributors to Ogorul newspaper, put out by the National Peasants' Party in Constanța County. Historian Stoica Lascu believed that they did so as cadres of the PCR or of its Union of Communist Youth, which had friendly relations with Peasantist left. In Ogorul, Gheorghiu objected to the youth's "continuous fascization", proposing instead a rally around "democracy, constitutional liberties, [and] peace."

=== Surrealism and post-surrealism ===
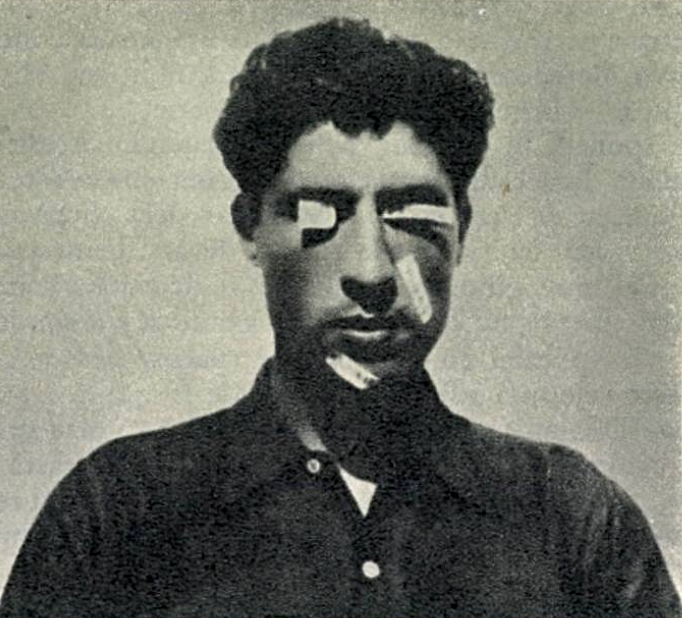
Gheorghiu's surrealist friend, Gellu Naum, staging one of his "self-poems" in 1940

After struggling to complete courses in sociology (with Dimitrie Gusti) and pedagogy, Gheorghiu ultimately took a bachelor's degree in philosophy. For a while, he pursued a terminal degree, but gave up on the project; in old age, he refused to comment on the failure of his studies. In 1938, he was being kept under watch by the Siguranța agency, which monitored dissent in the Kingdom of Romania; its agents suspected that, like Teodorescu and Păun, he was working for the PCR. He was still keeping company with the militant avant-garde after the outbreak of World War II: in early 1940, he joined Păun and other surrealists in their conflict with a former ally, Zaharia Stancu, reaffirming their group loyalties with a party in Bucharest; its other guests were Teodorescu, Maria Banuș, Constantin Ionescu Gulian, and Jules Perahim. During a Nazi-aligned rule by Ion Antonescu, Gheorghiu also maintained contacts with his various leftist friends, Romanian as well as Jewish. Paraschivescu attested his presence during an October 1942 gathering at Bucharest's Café de la Paix, which was particularly lively. Other attendees included Perahim, Geo Dumitrescu, Virgil Ierunca, Gherasim Luca, Dolfi Trost, as well as the non-communist Mircea Streinul.

Gheorghiu himself remembered eventually taking his distance from the surrealist cell, indicating that the reasons for this were non-ideological, and the terms amiable. During the final stages of World War II, he also became critical of communism. In 1944, he was in Constanța. Here, he caught news of an anti-fascist coup and the start Soviet occupation, immediately followed by rumors that a local vendor, Pascalide, had been arrested for unlawful speculation. In later years, Gheorghiu still remembered the newspaper hawker's commentary, adopting his expression, ie dă [sic] rău ("things be bad"), as a descriptor for the country's subsequent communization. He was finally in contact with Barbu, who was likewise involved in cultivating Caragiale's legacy—he credited the more senior poet as his only living teacher, through whom he got to understand classics such as Mihai Eminescu. Around 1947, Barbu made him "secretary in perpetuity" of the Mateiu Caragiale Club, formed by him at Casa Capșa restaurant. This gave the young man nominal authority over other Caragiale exegetes, including Marcel Breslașu, Oscar Lemnaru, and Alexandru Rosetti. Gheorghiu was always proud of having been dedicated one of Barbu's short poems, in which he was described as "the perpetual nobleman".

Following the establishment of a Romanian communist regime in 1948, Gheorghiu was exposed to some measure of persecution. He was for a while only active as a literary columnist, originally in a new series of Viața Romînească—and later in Secolul 20 and Contemporanul. At some point before 1970, the first of these three magazines had him as proofreader. In one instance from c. 1950, he was severely reprimanded for an apparent typo in his texts, which was supposed to include obligatory references to the moral superiority of communism, described therein as "the liquidation of all exploitation of man by man". In the printed version, it came out as "the liquidation of man by man", leading dissident intellectuals to proclaim that Gheorghiu had been an unwitting prophet. The writer also annoyed the authorities by cultivating bohemianism, and inviting his colleagues to have "breakfast" with him at dinner-time, in what his friend Ștefan Stoian describes as "a sordid dive on [Bucharest's] Academiei Street". This was his place of refuge in the early 1960s, after Barbu's death—and after Paul Georgescu, of the Writers' Union, had taken notice of Gheorghiu's "insolent" remarks, banning him from all literary reunions at Casa Capșa.

Continuing to cultivate Caragiale's style privately, Gheorghiu was inspired by his mentor in taking up translation work, infusing it with Caragialesque references. Olariu, who observed his writing process first-hand, praises his "jeweler's meticulousness", which meant abandoning his lifelong lethargy. Gheorghiu's initial fame rested on his samples of mainly French poetry, put out by these magazines, as well as by Iașul Literar and Orizont. In 1953, he and Dan Duțescu finished translating a selection of James Aldridge's prose. According to a 2015 article by eyewitness Gabriel Dimisianu, de-Stalinization and a relaxation of communist censorship during the late 1950s signaled more creative liberty, and surer employment, for the "late-wave surrealists"—Gheorghiu, Teodorescu, and Naum. In 1958, Gheorghiu produced a volume of Louis Aragon's poems, followed in 1959 by samples of Theodosios Pieridis' verse (from the Greek) and in 1962 by a collection of "Nordic" poets, co-written with Veronica Porumbacu. As observed by scholar Luminița Marcu, the latter project was tributary to communist guidelines, grouping "irrelevant" leftist authors; it was republished in a more thorough 1968 edition, with additional contributions by Petre Stoica.

Gheorghiu was featured in the state-sponsored Shakespearean corpus, with Pericles, Prince of Tyre (1962), which was that play's first-ever translation into Romanian—and used for the first-ever staging by a Romanian troupe, done by the Brașov State Theater in 1964. As noted by fellow translator George Volceanov, he was pushed by censorship into toning down the play's risqué allusions to prostitution and syphilis. After contributing to Romulus Vulpescu's anthology of Classical Chinese poetry (1963), Gheorghiu was especially acclaimed for his Italian translations. With his version of Giuseppe Tomasi di Lampedusa's Leopard (as Ghepardul), he won the Writers' Union prize for 1964. The book fascinated him with its linguistic and symbolic parallels to Craii; in order to capture its nuances, he spent two years refining it, and thus tested his publisher's patience for a book "that one might translate in three months". He also felt that this project had honored Caragiale's legacy, and for this reason dedicated it to actor Ion Iancovescu, one of Mateiu's few surviving friends. Gheorghiu also noted that the translation was largely ignored in the press until being intensely publicized by two of his generation colleagues, and his personal best friends—Paraschivescu and Aurel Baranga. A younger friend, Dan Ciachir, observed, upon reading the original, that the Romanian version had preserved all of the "inextricable threads of each phrase", only adding a "whiff of the Levant" to Lampedusa's narrative.

=== Final rediscovery ===
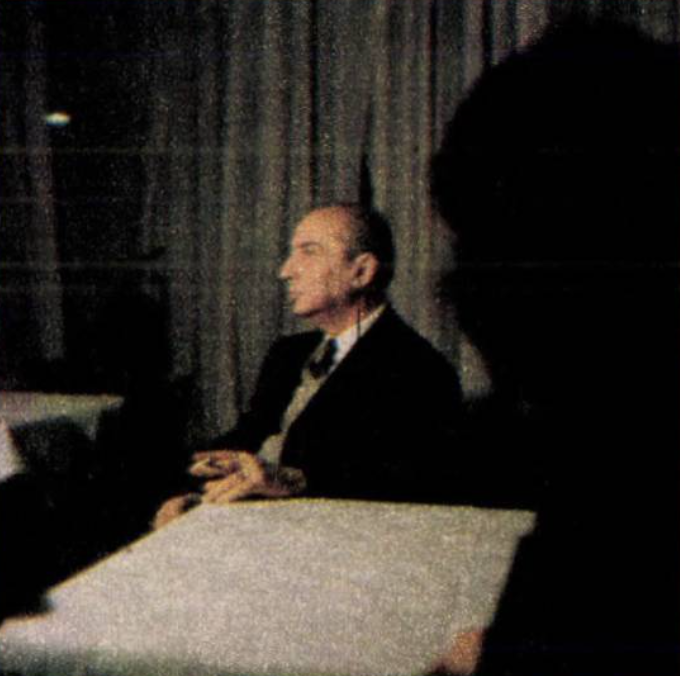
Gheorghiu at a restaurant table in 1974

Around April 1967, Gheorghiu was testing the regime's relative liberalization by openly associating with the philosopher Petre Țuțea, who spoke to him about his time in communist prisons. Others who listened in as guests of their restaurant table were Stoica, the literary critic Ovidiu Cotruș, as well as a young poet, Șerban Foarță; they were warned by a left-wing dissident, Alexandru Ivasiuc, not to expose themselves, since Țuțea had not yet been "vetted" (despușcăriat). In that context, Foarță also heard Gheorghiu's own thoughts about communism as a peril. He recalls being taken aback by his older friend's mannerisms (which echoed those of Caragiale's protagonists) and his drawings, which had an "unmistakable, cursive duct". Others also rediscovered Gheorghiu as a visual artist. Eugen Barbu of Luceafărul made his the first magazine to use Gheorghiu's drawings as illustrations, while poet Nichita Stănescu commissioned his portrait of Urmuz; joining them was a fellow surrealist, Sașa Pană, who published various of Gheorghiu's ink pierces in his anthology of avant-garde literature.

Gheorghiu expanded his coverage of literature, becoming a main Romanian translator of Marcel Proust, Alain Robbe-Grillet, and Jean-Paul Sartre—though such works were only carried by magazines. Luceafărul also accepted his contributions in that field, in particular with versions of poems by Guillaume Apollinaire and Tristan Corbière. He published as volumes his versions of two modern novels: François Billetdoux's Il faut passer par les nuages (1967) and Luigi Pirandello's The Late Mattia Pascal (1968); with Vasile Nicolescu, he penned versions of Robert Desnos' Night of Loveless Nights (1969) and Apollinaire's most characteristic poems; on his own, he published a collection of poetry by Robert Sabatier (1974). Gheorghiu's background as a surrealist was put to use for another anthology, sampling 20th-century French literature—with as Ion Caraion and Ovid S. Crohmălniceanu as editors. Revisiting the edition in 2007, critic Simona Vasilache argued that he was especially good in his renditions of Tristan Tzara and Antonin Artaud, but also that his talents were ill-suited for rendering Dada poetry.

In 1970, the intercession of an unnamed communist official ("one who has done a lot to help the artists") finally allowed Gheorghiu to move out of Broșteanu Street and into a more comfortable dwelling. This was a studio apartment carved out of a property owned by fellow writer Ion Pas, on Rozelor Street; it accommodated Gheorghiu's "thousands of books and a few paintings sent to him by his artist friends." He was by then rediscovering Lautréamont, whose poetry, Olariu argues, preoccupied him obsessively throughout the 1960s. It also inspired drawings that he exhibited, alongside line-art portraits, in late 1970. Artist Iulian Mereuță was impressed by these, noting that, as a draftsman, Gheorghiu had surpassed the surrealism of his poetic work, and had created something entirely original. He was then recognized nationally for translating the Comte's Les Chants de Maldoror. Published in 1976, it earned him another Writers' Union prize the following year. The work was met with some criticism by young authors: in 1984, Aurel Dragoș Munteanu complained that, while Lautréamont had were "the acute expression of a positivist century", including in matters of language, Gheorghiu's Chants sounded medieval; in a 2015 interview, Dinu Flămând, who was preparing his own integral translation of Lautréamont, observed that Gheorghiu's project had been "whittled down" by the state censorship apparatus, and had therefore failed its readers.

Engaged in translating Saint-Simon's memoirs, Gheorghiu was considering beginning work on his own book of recollections—and intending to write them in an unconventional, purely conversational style. He was by then noted for his unconventional and consuming life-choices. He spent most of his time in restaurants, only leaving his booth in the late afternoon, when he would go on a tour of literary magazines, pestering their managers with various requests regarding his translations and his royalties; though he engaged in conspicuous consumption and was beloved by the waiters for his generous tips, his income always depended on the goodwill of magazine publishers. George Arion of Flacăra, who interviewed him in 1974, observed that he was chain smoking, alternating packs of Dunhill and Record (after tearing off their filters), and continuously drinking coffee. He told Arion that his workdays, as both a translator and an artist, began at 1 AM. Sometimes, he used a more secluded table at Lido Restaurant as his writing desk.

Gheorghiu's final published effort came in 1979, with Arthur Rimbaud's Season in Hell. Comparatist Nicolae Balotă was moved by his "superb renditions" of the cycle (done in "pious fidelity"), as well as by Gheorghiu's portrait of Rimbaud as a "bird-poet", which was printed with the book. Around then, Gheorghiu was in correspondence with the geologist and anti-communist dissident Gelu Voican Voiculescu, who was also his successor as Viața Romînească's proofreader. The secondary goal of such letters was to "confuse posterity" with incomprehensible references or surreal humor; making fun of the Rozelor Street address (which is a literal reference to roses), Voiculescu referred to the aging translator as a "Rosicrucian", while signing himself Gelu Zadarnicu ("Fruitless Gelu"). Increasingly isolated and focused during his final years, Gheorghiu died in Bucharest on 17 October 1981. His death was described by various sources as "sudden".

== Legacy ==
Obituary pieces included one by poet Adrian Păunescu, whom the news caught in Satu Mare. He deplored the death of a "kind, humane, irreducible artist", adding: "Now that Tașcu Gheorghiu has died, libraries across this country are witnessing the deaths of all those whom he has translated into Romanian." Gheorghiu was outlived by his sister Chrisanta (or Hrisanta) Russu, who announced his Orthodox funeral service at Boteanu Church and his subsequent burial at Străulești II Cemetery. On 25 October 1981, the recently deceased author was honored by Radio Romania with live recitation of his 100 "most beautiful translations" of poetry. Chrisanta also organized his parastas service at Old St. Eleftherios Church, on 31 October 1987. She had inherited his papers, some of which she sold to the Museum of Romanian Literature in 1986. His letters from Gelu Zadarnicu were published in Manuscriptum's first issue for 2009, under the mistaken assumption that they were by Naum. Voiculescu outed himself as the author in 2011.

Gheorghiu had recovered and arranged for print some of his surrealist poems, which he left to the literary historian Marin Mincu. Mincu published them in his anthology of the interwar avant-garde (1984), allowing poet Florin Mugur to rediscover and applaud Gheorghiu's "great talent". Some of these texts were sampled in translation by Eva Behring, for an anthology published in East Germany in 1988. Gheorghiu's contribution to the Romanian Shakespeare corpus was still being recovered after both his death and the Romanian Revolution of 1989, with another such volume appearing in early 1991. His Ghepardul had remained a standard of Lampedusa editions in Romanian, with a third edition published in 1995. A competing version, proposing to overcome Gheorghiu's "unmistakable stylistic imprint" and Caragialesque echoes, was produced in 2011 by Gabriela Lungu.
