= Sesto Pals =

Russian-born Romanian and Israeli writer (1912/3–2002)

Sesto Pals (Simion Șestopali)
- Born: 1912 or 1913; Odessa
- Died: October 27, 2002 (aged 89 or 90); Tel Aviv
- Occupations: poet, philosopher, engineer, draftsman
- Writing career
- Pen name: D. Amprent
- Period: 1930–2002
- Genres: lyric poetry, blank verse, prose poem, haiku, essay
- Movements: unu, Expressionism, Surrealism

Sesto Pals, pen name of Simion (also Simon, Semion) Șestopali (born Шестопаль, also rendered as S(h)estopal, Sestopaly, or Sestopali; ca. 1912 – October 27, 2002), was a Russian-born Romanian and Israeli writer. Primarily a poet-philosopher, he also earned recognition as a graphic artist. He first became known in his teenage years, when, as a friend and associate of Gherasim Luca, he put out the review Alge. Its avant-garde aesthetics and its testing of censorship resulted in their prosecution. While Luca endured as a public intellectual and a founder of the Romanian surrealist cell, Pals became a recluse.

Forgotten by the general public, exposed to antisemitic and later communist persecution, he continued to write for himself and an intimate circle of friends. He had a successful career in civil and railway engineering, but political nonconformity resulted in his marginalization for part of the 1960s.

Moving to Haifa in 1970, Pals was rediscovered by later generations of Romanian and Israeli readers, known to them for the moderate surrealism of his poetry and prose, and, to a lesser degree, for his take on Hegelian philosophy. His editorial debut came well into his 80s, when Pals was already bedridden and contemplating death. This led to his rediscovery as a contributor to both Romanian and Israeli literature.

== Biography ==
=== Early life ===
Simion "Senia" Shestopal, the scion of a Ukrainian Jewish family, was born in Odessa, officially on September 18, 1913, but more likely on September 5, 1912. The writer's father, known later in life as "Emanoil Șestopali", was a Stambuliote Jew who had taken Italian citizenship. According to literary historian Ovid Crohmălniceanu, the poet's own familiarity with Jewish mythology and the Hebrew language can be read as a clue that he was enlisted in a cheder. S. Sfarti, who worked with the poet-engineer in the 1950s, notes that his name was unusual in his adoptive Romania, making his ethnicity hard to pin down, and never discussed at his office. The family name probably originated in a Russian moniker for "six fingers" or "six toes", and Simion bragged that he himself had inherited an extra toe.

Simion lived in Odessa with his parents and his brother Fima until 1920, when they were chased out of the country by the revolutionary war. His father continued to enjoy protection from the Italian diplomatic mission, before moving with his family to Romania and legally changing his name. In 1922, a tribunal in Covurlui County registered his renunciation of Italian citizenship. Simion's mother, Berta née Berman, later arranged for her own relatives to settle in the new country. They lived in Galați, where Simion and Fima began their schooling, until 1923, then moved to Bucharest; in the 1930s, their home address was at No 6 on Brâncoveanu Street.

Simion enlisted at the Matei Basarab High School, where he was colleagues with poet Gherasim Luca. Sharing a school-desk, the two became close friends. They also associated with Aurel Baranga, who was in the same school, but slightly younger. Their circle also included female colleagues and admirers, among them Henriette Iacobsohn, future wife of the cartoonist Saul Steinberg, and Amelia Pavel, later an essayist and art historian. Pavel, who vacationed with Simion at Sovata in summer 1930, remembered him as a "nice and well-behaved youth". Nevertheless, all three young men made a habit of deriding cultural conventions: Pals was almost expelled from school when he burst out laughing during a lecture on poet-laureate Vasile Alecsandri. In 1930, having kept up with the Western European and Romanian avant-garde, Luca founded the radical youth magazine Alge ("Algae"), with collaborations from Șestopali (the nominal "chief editor"), Baranga, and Jules Perahim; they were later joined by Paul Păun. Șestopali experimented with literary pseudonyms, sometimes signing his work for Alge as D. Amprent and then, for the first time ever, Sesto Pals. A quasi-anagram of his Romanian name-and-initial, it was sometimes corrected to Șesto Pals in later reference, but the poet always signed his work sans diacritic.

=== Obscenity scandal ===
Underfunded, Alge only put out six or seven issues in this 1930 edition. By February 1932, Pals had established his own single-issue magazine, titled Muci ("Snot") and distributed free of charge at one of Perahim's art shows. Like Păun and the other Alge men, he was also co-opted by unu, the more established avant-garde sheet, but had a tense encounter with its editor, Sașa Pană. Nonetheless, unu hosted some of Pals' prose poems, including one which mockingly advertised Perahim's art as a "horrid crime" against the state. In addition to writing poetry, he was interested in hard science, taking his baccalaureate with honors in physics. He barely passed the overall examination, after having again slammed Alecsandri's work in his Romanian literature paper.

In 1933, Luca reissued Alge in a more licentious edition, and challenged the cultural establishment by sending a copy to Nicolae Iorga, the nationalist historian and political figure. A clampdown on their activities followed: all known contributors were caught in a police investigation, and Pals' home was searched for incriminating proof. Despite no longer being a contributor (and feeling alienated by Păun and Baranga's leftist militancy), Pals was implicated by his nominal editorial contribution. He was eventually arrested in mid-July 1933 and sent to Văcărești Prison, where his colleagues were also rounded up. Pals later recalled being subjected to a thorough interrogation by the examining magistrate, and sharing a cell with a known communist. Taking his instructions from Iorga, the coroner alleged that the Șestopalis were themselves communists, sent in from the Soviet Union to subvert Romanian society. The family was threatened with expulsion.

The writers' parents eventually obtained their release, with Emanoil pleading with his son that he amend his ways. The court ruled against the Alge group, and issued two-year suspended sentences against them. This tarnished their judicial record, leaving Pals exposed to persecution. Pals was traumatized by the whole experience, and no longer bothered with his college admission, although his grades qualified him for enlistment at the Bucharest Polytechnic. In 1934, when he and his family were naturalized Romanian, Pals finally matriculated with the Polytechnic, where he majored in mining engineering and metallurgy. He kept out of literary life. When, in 1939, Luca returned from Paris a committed surrealist, Pals was invited to attend the sessions of his Bucharest surrealist circle. He did so on occasion, meeting with new recruits such as Dolfi Trost and Gellu Naum, but, as Pals biographer Michäel Finkenthal notes, "chain smoked [and] kept himself dead silent." Pals himself later asserted: "I never did 'fade' out of sight, I have always been out of sight."

=== Antisemitic persecution and communist oppression ===
Pals graduated in 1940, just as the National Renaissance Front dictatorship had barred Jews from employment in most fields, including technical. Pushed out of literary life, Pals discovered philosophy, and became an avid reader of Hegel. Finkenthal notes that his "rather obsessive preoccupation" was "to quantify qualitative values", a "strange mixture of Hegelianism and abstract arithmetic". Then, at the height of World War II, the Șestopalis came to be persecuted under tighter racial laws. Pals' brother Fima escaped to Palestine. Pals was singled out for compulsory labor, and sent to work as a "Jewish engineer" for the State Railways. By his own account, he was a salaried worker there after 1942. Making occasional returns to Bucharest, he had an amorous affair with Lucia "Lucy" Metsch, a Paris-trained painter of Bukovina Jewish extraction. She had narrowly escaped the Einsatzgruppen, and was working at The Barașeum.

Pals sought full employment after the antifascist coup of 1944, and, in 1945, was dispatched to oversee the construction of railway tunnels in Cluj County. Later that year, he returned to Bucharest, joining the City Planning Institute as founder and president of its geotechnical engineering section. He continued to advance professionally after the establishment of a communist regime. Around 1955, his job was to verify structural work on new railway bridges; as Sfarti recounts, his engineering reports were "always impeccable." The trade unions' newspaper, Munca, praised him for his invention of a drilling-and-probing technique for investigating underground structures. As this source noted, by January 1956 his invention had been used on fifteen new bridges, and had saved up to 2.5 million lei in building costs.

In 1946, engineer Șestopali parted with Lucy and married Valentina Berman. This created controversy: Valentina was Pals' first cousin and his junior by 15 years. She was also Holocaust survivor, having just returned from the concentration camp in Berezivka, Transnistria. Although he still refrained from an open affiliation, Pals continued to visit Luca and the surrealists, introducing his wife to them. His half-sister-in-law, Mura Vlad, was a published novelist and translator from Russian. The marriage soon crumbled: Pals was an absentee husband, and Valentina found it hard to cope with the rigors of life in communized Romania. Working as a state-registered typist, in 1956 she met the poet Ion Caraion, becoming his admirer, muse, and lover. Pals accepted the informal separation, resuming his love affair with Lucy Metsch, who now worked as a scenic painter for Sahia Film. He was increasingly withdrawn and troubled, dedicating himself to writing down a whole corpus of literary and philosophical works that he would not publish.

During that decade, the Șestopalis came into conflict with the communist regime. In 1957, an investigation began into Caraion's samizdat poetry, which was highly critical of the regime, and which Valentina had helped circulate. At the risk of incriminating himself, Pals returned to his conjugal home and protected his estranged wife. In mid-1958, Valentina was arrested by the Securitate, then implicated in Caraion's trial for sedition. She dismissed the option to denounce Caraion in exchange for freedom, and was sentenced to 15 years of hard labor. Pals himself wrote a statement denouncing both Valentina and Caraion, accusing the latter of having seduced and beguiled his wife. He accuses Caraion of having networked for far-right elements in the anti-communist underground, and specifically for the Iron Guard; he claimed that Valentina was cynically used by Caraion, to support a movement that had been "responsible for [her] past suffering".

In 1962, Pals applied for an exit visa and emigration to Israel; as Sfari notes, this came as a surprise to him. This rebellious gesture also resulted in Pals' demotion with reduced pay, and his relocation to the remote town of Dej. Valentina, released from prison under a general amnesty, divorced him in 1963, and later married Caraion. Pals also married Lucy in 1965, and, starting 1967, retook his position at the Bucharest Planning Institute. He earned respect in the engineers' community, and had several professional awards to his name, while privately working on a set of essays which sought to reconcile Hegelianism with existentialism and phenomenology.

=== Emigration ===
In 1969, Pană curated an anthology of avant-garde literature from the interwar period, which allocated some space to his Alge friends, including Pals. By his own account, the latter was living a quiet and exceptionally fulfilling life, down to 1970: caught up in his work during daytime, he turned to writing literature at night, and reconnected with his avant-garde friends. He still refrained from going public, although two of his close friends, former avant-garde writers Baranga and Geo Bogza, were well regarded by the regime and could arrange him a publishing deal. He was more preoccupied with discovering (as he put it) "the mystery of existence through one's own existence". That interval came to an end in 1970, when he and his wife were allowed to emigrate. They were seen to their plane by Bogza, the dissenting communist. Pals was forced by the authorities to leave his voluminous manuscripts behind in Romania; he split them into fascicles, which he hid in various places. Ion and Valentina Caraion, together with their daughter Marta, were themselves allowed to leave in 1981, moving to Lausanne.

Caraion, who had agreed to collaborate with the Securitate in return for his freedom, was repeatedly blackmailed by his former supervisors. During the backlash that followed his departure, in April 1982 the national-communist weekly Săptămîna published Sestopali's statements against the Caraions, as part of a series called "Ion Caraion as seen by his family". Pals had by then resumed his professional career in Haifa, where he oversaw the digging of utility tunnels. He traveled outside the country to meet Luca, who was living in Paris. However, his health declined abruptly, and he was forced to take retirement in 1982. He suffered from gastrointestinal cancer, and was treated at the Rabin Medical Center.

Working from his home, a small apartment in Bnei Brak, Pals focused entirely on philosophical essays, which he composed in French, and a new set of visual poetry pieces. He reluctantly agreed to have samples of these works published in Romanian diaspora magazines—including Caraion's Don Quijote and Alexandru Lungu's Argo. In 1985, the Honolulu exile Ștefan Baciu dedicated him a special issue of his MELE, a poetry newsletter. It included homage pieces by his old friends Păun and Bogza. Interviewed about his work by journalist Solo Har-Herescu in 1993, Pals was oblique: "I am not fit to answer, as my head is filled with those snake-like questions, poisoning my replies, eating them up as they [...] bite into their own tails, making it hard to know where tails begin and heads end." His only reason for writing was "an inner urging", as "so much better poems" already existed, which were still "of no use to the reading public".

=== Final years and death ===
Sesto Pals the poet was rediscovered in Romania only after the 1989 Revolution: in 1998, Nicolae Tzone published a book of his poetry with Editura Vinea, as Omul ciudat ("The Bizarre Man"). It was only at this time that Pals' former colleagues in the Bucharest Planning Institute discovered that he was the same as the avant-garde poet, as Sfarti confessed in a letter to the editors. Omul ciudat had a small circulation and, according to critic Răzvan Voncu, was only popular among the "connoisseurs of the avant-garde". The book earned Pals the Benjamin Fondane Award, granted by the Association of Romanian Writers in Israel. Pals' health condition was declining to such a degree that he had to be carried to that ceremony; by 1999, he was bedridden and tube-fed, but fully conscious and perfecting poems that were supposed to convey his final message to the world.

Pals was still working on this on October 17, 2002, when he had to be taken to hospital. He died in Tel Aviv, on October 27, 2002. Just days before this happened, the Romanian review Tribuna hosted three of his final poems. Pals' last work saw print a month later, in Ultima Oră, the Tel Aviv Romanian-Jewish newspaper. A revised edition of Omul ciudat came out at Editura Paideia, with illustrations by Mariana Macri, daughter of Pals' friend Ionathan X. Uranus. Much of Pals' sizable fortune was bequeathed to the Rabin Medical Center, founding a research unit "for early detection and prevention of gastrointestinal cancer".

Pals was survived by Lucy, who died in 2006, and by Valentina Caraion, both of whom participated in the effort to recover and edit his work. Although most of Pals' texts remained unpublished and under-researched, a follow-up to Omul ciudat, titled Întuneric și lumină ("Darkness and Light") was put out in Romania in 2007. His 2013 centennial was celebrated in Romania under the auspices of the Museum of Romanian Literature and Gaudeamus Book Fair. Interest in Pals' work and personality was kept alive by the philosopher-physicist Michäel Finkenthal, who also collected some of the lesser known prose works into a 2014 anthology. A fictionalized portrayal of Pals as "the bizarre poet" is found in Virgil Duda's 2011 novel, Un cetățean al lumii ("A Citizen of the World").

== Work ==
In 1969, commenting on the Pană anthology, literary critic Nicolae Manolescu opined that Pals, like Grigore Cugler and Filip Corsa, belonged to the most artistically irrelevant section of the Romanian avant-garde, and suggested that his name was not worth mentioning in any larger panorama of Romanian literature. Various other exegetes have contrarily reached the conclusion that Pals' Alge poetry is ahead of its time and context, one of the more notable contribution to the second-wave avant-garde in Romania. Paul Cernat describes a clash of visions between the "prophetic" ambitions of Alge and Pals' character, that of a "vulnerable introvert, terrorized by the precariousness of the human condition". According to Ion Pop, some of these poems stand out among the "purely awkward exercises" of youth, as "unhinged" expressionist pieces in succession to those of Adrian Maniu and Jules Laforgue. Other, tamer, pieces were directly inspired by the hermetic Ion Barbu and the mainstream modernist Tudor Arghezi. Several poems are singled out by Crohmălniceanu for being biblical-themed and distinctly apocalyptic, while yet others are "socially-inspired", "unanimistic" and "fraternal", addressed to "those people I meet on the tram".

By the mid-1950s, when he settled for a format of blank verse and haikus, Pals was prone to philosophical meditation, and explored much deeper into lyrical themes. As argued by Finkenthal, this change was prompted by his separation from Valentina: "From now on, the poet finds himself locked in a world where things happen, things change, where there is no longer room for any refuge into love or wisdom." According to Voncu, there was another cultural layer: like Gellu Naum and other late arrivals on the avant-garde scene, Pals was moving away from the sheer negativity of Alge, and attempting to construct instead a post-philosophical surrealism. Cernat sees Pals' surrealism as having "a familiar face", with classical-format quatrains like those of Tristan Tzara, H. Bonciu, and Jacques Prévert.

Some of Pals' poems, tentatively dated to 1958, seemingly allude to Valentina's arrest by the communists and the whole wave of political repression. Such dark and brooding works are held by both Finkenthal and Voncu as proof that Caraion and Pals influenced each other directly, despite their erotic rivalry. One fragment depicts silent struggles between the scheming fishermen and their catch, implying that fish still have a dying hope:

Dar noaptea cînd luna nu mai are lumină
Cînd valurile cresc peste țărm
Cînd vîntul se unește cu întunericul
Atunci pescarii simt marele suflet al mării
Desprins din adîncuri...
Atunci, vietățile mării îi cheamă în adînc
Îi cheamă în miile de prăpăstii în mișcare
Și vai de bietul pescar atras în prăpastia mării...

Translation:

But at night, the moon being left in its dimness,
The waves swelling over the shore,
The wind and the darkness colliding,
Fishermen will sense that great soul of the sea
Rising up from the depths...
Right then, sea creatures will beacon them down under,
Pull them into scores of movable chasms,
And woe unto whoever goes down, pulled into the chasm of the sea...

In 1960s prose poems which display influences from Franz Kafka or Urmuz, Pals amplified his sense of bafflement about the human condition. Nonetheless, Finkenthal writes, his very series of lyrical verse hints at "truths that are inaccessible to common mortals". He reconciled himself with the idea of time by denying its concreteness, but drew a line between general time and "the time of creation". The latter allowed for a future, and therefore provided room for "affirmation and oblivion". This meant that, "once he puts himself on the line, an artist will have to fade into his own affirmation." The moribund Pals sketched out a quaint prophecy:

Privește... în curînd vor veni
norii
Picături mari de tăcere vor
curge din cer
Și florile obosite vor înţelege
totul

Translation:

See here... soon will come the
clouds
Big drops of silence shall
pour in from the skies
That wearied flowers may then grasp
it all
