= Paul Păun =

Romanian artist (1915–1994)

Paul Păun Paul Paon Paul Paon Zaharia Zaharia Herșcovici Zaharia Zaharia
- Born: September 5, 1915; Bucharest
- Died: April 9, 1994 (aged 78); Haifa
- Occupations: poet, visual artist, medical doctor and surgeon
- Writing career
- Pen name: Paul Păun, Paul Paon, Paul Paon Zaharia, Yvenez
- Period: 1930–1994
- Genres: lyric poetry, prose poem, essay
- Literary movement: proletkult, surrealism

Paul Păun (September 5, 1915 – April 9, 1994), born Zaharia Herșcovici and who later in life changed his legal name to Zaharia Zaharia, also signed his work Paul Paon and Paul Paon Zaharia. He was a Romanian and Israeli avant-garde poet and visual artist, who wrote in Romanian and French and produced surrealist and abstract drawings. He was also a medical doctor and surgeon. His work is registered with the ADAGP (Société des Auteurs dans les Arts Graphiques et Plastiques) and the SGDL (Société des Gens de Lettres).

Inspired in his youth by the poetry of Vladimir Mayakovsky and Sergei Yesenin and by the Romanian avant-garde magazine unu, he was a co-founder in the early 1930s of the magazines Alge and Viața Imediată. Păun set himself the goal of making poetry a living experience. He experimented briefly with licentious, ludic themes (and was thus prosecuted for pornography) before turning to Marxism and proletkult aesthetics. Like other avant-garde writers, including his friends Gherasim Luca and Dolfi Trost, he adhered to the then-illegal Romanian Communist Party.

Păun soon developed an interest in surrealism, and became a member of the surrealist group formed at the very start of World War II (alongside Gherasim Luca, Gellu Naum, Trost, and Virgil Teodorescu). This small community survived clandestinely during the war years, when Păun himself was marginalized due to his Jewish ethnicity. It reemerged as a short-lived but very active group after the war, with many of their collective works written in French. Păun also had at the time a noted debut as a surrealist painter and illustrator.

Like other artists and intellectuals in Romania and elsewhere, he found himself disenchanted with Stalinism already in the late 1930s, and subsequently with the post-war Romanian communist regime. Exposed to communist censorship, he stopped publishing or exhibiting his work. He emigrated to Israel when he was already in his late forties, and focused on his medical career, with occasional public contributions to art and literature.

== Biography ==
=== Debut years ===
Păun (whose pseudonym is the Romanian for "peacock") was a native of Bucharest. Both his parents were Jewish. The poet's paternal grandfather, Zaharia, was an observant Jew from the Russian Empire who had escaped the draft and was living incognito in Romania; his first name was passed on to his grandson, Zaharia. The family was registered as Herșcovici, which was Păun's first official surname.

Păun, his parents, and his older sister Nini lived in a suburb area just south of Dealul Mitropoliei. Nini was in school with another young Jewish future poet, Maria Banuș, who soon became affectionate friends, and one-time lovers, with Păun (whom she called Pepe, Bebe, or Bebică). In 1932, Banuș described him as: "The solitary, tormented, poseur, rebellious, ironic boy of 17, with his mouth demanding like that of a little girl (Nini's mouth), a large nose, round eyes with overgrown eyelashes, bohemian hair, [and] open-necked shirts". She noted that his family was well educated and spoke French at home, where they maintained a "beautiful atmosphere", and that Păun himself was a good mandolin player.

While still a high school student, at around age 15, Păun, together with Aurel Baranga, Sesto Pals, and Gherasim Luca, approached the more senior avant-garde writers at unu. As unu editor Sașa Pană recalled: "Because we didn't want them to look like an epigone annex of ours, for they were indeed talented, daring and nonconformist, we advised them to put out a magazine of their own and, once they established their reputation, we were to invite them over at unu."

This led the youth to inaugurate, in September 1930, the magazine Alge ("Algae"), together with painter S. Perahim, who gave it its visual dimension. According to Swedish researcher Tom Sandqvist, the Alge group was already receiving its cultural inspiration from surrealism and Dada, "favoring more or less absurd puns and provocative, violent gestures". Scholar Giovanni Magliocco summarizes Alge-ist philosophy as "a still-embryonic kind of 'surrealism', incendiary and iconoclastic, [...] a literary extremism, verbally violent and delirious, but still confused as far as programs go".

Păun was probably the last to actually publish in Alge (starting with its 6th issue), which hosted some of his earliest work: a selection of strange, often erotic poetry. It includes "Poem cu părul meu sălbatic" (Poem with My Wild Hair), "Poem de dimineaţă" (Morning Poem), "Voi oameni picaturi de otravă" (You Poison-Drop Men). As argued in 2001 by literary historian Ovid Crohmălniceanu, these works, which also embrace social critique, "no longer shock, and their value, such as it is, transcends aesthetics." In October 1931, Păun was also a contributor to the Alge supplement provocatively titled Pulă ("Cock"), with a poem that referred to the ruling class as "shit".

The establishment was clamping down on the literary avant-garde, accusing it of pornography: Păun was in the audience as a court tried and acquitted the pioneer surrealist Geo Bogza (November 28, 1932), whom Păun had befriended in October 1931. Păun was enthusiastic about Bogza's search for an anti-art, prosaic poetry, as he explained in a letter to Banuș: "what do [the Alge writers] want, after all? They are sick to their stomachs, to their tongues, after all the sweets they have been fed by the poets. By those who go for things of beauty, not things of experience [Păun's emphasis]. [...] We write because life leaves us hopeless". In his search for an "original" format, Păun even rejected being labeled a "modernist", "because a modernist can be allowed not to be a modernist". Some tensions between the unu and Alge groups were already evident: the latter for a while boycotted unu, because it had refused to publish one of Luca's texts in extenso. Pană referred to the other Alge supplement, titled Muci (Snot), as "pornography ... but not devoid of a certain humor."

=== 1933 imprisonment and Viața Imediată proletkult ===
Alge interrupted publication at some point in 1931, but was briefly revived, under Pals' direction, in March 1933. A copy of one of its issues was sent by the editors themselves to a leading conservative culture critic, former premier Nicolae Iorga, who ordered a criminal investigation of Alge contributors, on charges of pornography. Păun's contributions to Pulă were discovered during a search of Pals' attic, when the supplement was confiscated as evidence. Together with Alge editors and contributors Baranga, Luca, Pals, and Jules Perahim, he was detained for 9 days at the Văcărești Prison. Despite becoming the objects of an antisemitic campaign in newspapers such as Cuvântul and Universul, the Alge contributors only received suspended sentences. Pals, the non-naturalized son of Ukrainian Jews, was threatened with deportation.

Păun was eventually welcomed at unu, where he published in 1932 one of the most representative among his early poems, titled “Epitaf pentru omul-bou” (Epitaph for the Man-Ox), but continued to publish more conventional verse in left-wing reviews: Facla, Cuvântul Liber, Azi, and even the more aesthetically traditionalist Viața Românească. Like the other unu writers, he clamored his belief in anti-capitalism and social justice, as well as in proletkult-style literature, and expressed alarm at the rise of fascism. With Perahim, Luca and Miron Radu Paraschivescu, Păun took directives from the illegal Communist Party, but not uncritically: on Labor Day (1 May) 1933, the party ordered them to show up for a demonstration carrying the red flag, which Păun and two others refused, noting that such a parade exposed them to useless risks. More principled cases of distancing from the Party and outright disobedience during the period 1938 to 1940 are also documented.

In December 1933, Păun, Perahim and Luca co-signed with Bogza the opening manifesto of Bogza's avant-garde magazine, Viața Imediată ("The Life Immediate"). This was a communist-inspired "proletarian magazine", partly modeled on Alexandru Sahia's Bluze Albastre. According to Crohmălniceanu, it put out four issues in all but according to other sources, only one number of this magazine actually saw the light. Păun was by then embarrassed by his Alge poetry, which he found childish, although Viața Imediată's manifesto on art reaffirmed the core Alge thesis. It read: "We aim to break out of this suave past and give poetry a push into life. [...] Poetry shall have to become elementary, the way water and bread are elementary." At Cuvântul Liber, where he met the experienced journalist and literary reviewer Dolfi Trost, Păun gave a versified version of the communist party ideology, with works such as Poem pentru oprimat ("Poem to the Oppressed One"). His writing was also featured in the Marxist review Era Nouă, which was put out in Bucharest by N. D. Cocea.

For the next years, Păun was a regular presence in the literary press. His 1938 translation from the Comte de Lautréamont's Songs of Maldoror accompanied Gherasim Luca's article on Lautréamont in the communist newspaper Reporter, which insisted on reading Lautréamont through the grid of Marxist literary criticism. Păun's first important work was the 1939 poem Plămânul sălbatec ("The Savage Lung"), originally published in the Summer 1938 issue of Azi and the following year in book form. His poetry was veering into the apocalyptic, and, according to scholars Yaari and Magliocco, seemed to harbor a presentiment of The Holocaust.

=== World War II and surrealist discoveries ===
In early 1940, Păun graduated from the University of Bucharest Faculty of Medicine. He had resumed his caste friendship with Banuș, having recently married. His wife was Reni Zaharia (who would also eventually become a painter of decalcomania). Their private circle now included Marxist philosopher Constantin Ionescu Gulian, and poets Virgil Teodorescu and Tașcu Gheorghiu.

In the winter of 1939, Păun was writing for Zaharia Stancu's newspaper, Lumea Românească. Apparently, while acting as a liaison between Stancu and the communists he found himself caught in between as the newspaper published articles condemning the Soviet invasion of Finland; reprimanded by Paraschivescu and Gulian, Stancu decided to make a clean break with these communists (although he would eventually build a very successful literary career under the communist regime), and sacked Păun. At about the same time, Banuș, who still had doubts about Marxism (although she would eventually become an official, albeit somewhat conflicted, poetess of the regime), recorded in her diary that she felt "ashamed" to confront Păun about everything that she herself did not have the courage and energy to do.

By 1940, Păun had made his choice. Both he and Teodorescu had joined the Bucharest surrealist group, whose founders were Luca and Gellu Naum. Trost followed suit, having probably been co-opted by Păun. The resulting circle, or "Group of Five", was Romania's "third avant-garde" wave, and the first one to explicitly align itself with surrealism. Păun's was a "rather predictable conversion", according to Crohmălniceanu: "his own leanings and the very course of events" signaled a transition from generic avant-garde to specific surrealism. The members of the group carried out new experiments in collaborative writing, described by Păun in 1983 as the pinnacle of surrealist automatism: "the artist, now a modest one, admires the great art of the encounter, of the happening."

Their preference, as a group, to publish in French, signaling a thirst for international recognition and integration with European modernism, was made impractical by the Nazi occupation of Europe. The surrealist group survived clandestinely during the repressive fascist regimes of the National Legionary State and Ion Antonescu. Its leftist ideals and the Jewish origins of three of its affiliates made it impossible for the group to express itself openly: Trost, for instance, was explicitly banned by the authorities.

The surrealists were not physically harmed during the Bucharest pogrom, but were exposed during those years to the antisemitic restrictions: Luca was conscripted into a forced labor detachment, while Trost was employed as a schoolteacher for the segregated Jewish schools. After Romania's involvement in the anti-Soviet war, Păun's services as a physician were requisitioned, and he was sent over to provide healthcare services in POW camps. Naum, an ethnic Romanian, saw action on the front, and was discharged in 1941 with posttraumatic stress disorder. They were still in contact with communist affiliates such as the old-time friend, poet Stephan Roll, and, according to some interpretations, still adhered to Marxist ideology.

Although prevented from publishing, the Romanian surrealists produced handwritten and typewritten manuscripts, some of which, including Păun's, were conceived as an artist's book. Working alongside Teodorescu and Trost, Păun contributed to the texts L'Amour invisible (Invisible Love) and Diamantul conduce mâinile ("The Diamond Leads the Hands"), which were to be included in a planned "Surrealist Collection," a collection that was only partially realized after the war without these two texts. The latter of the two comprised 30 prose poems, heavily indebted to the "Bizarre Pages" of Romanian avant-garde hero Urmuz.

=== Surrealist revival, communist repression ===
The 1944 coup d'état which toppled Antonescu's fascist regime, and the subsequent Soviet occupation of Romania, allowed the Romanian surrealist group to briefly come out of hiding, before the second totalitarian regime experienced by their country, this one from the left, would curtail their activities. In 1945, Păun changed his surname from Herșcovici to Zaharia. That year marked his return to publishing with the important poem Marea palidă ("The Pale Sea"), as well as to visual art: he illustrated with drawings (called lovaje) Teodorescu's Butelia de Leyda plaquette and held his first personal exhibition of surrealist drawings (see Hasan 2011, Yaari 2012 and 2014, and Stern 2011). The surrealist group had contacts with other writers, such as the Holocaust survivor Paul Celan, but the latter was not a member of the group (he had not lived in Romania during the war and would soon leave for France). Also joining them was Nadine Krainik, a former lover of Păun's, who would settle in Paris soon after the war and serve as a link between the Romanian and French surrealist groups, namely between Luca and André Breton.

Păun's 1945 exhibition served as the basis for a surrealist happening engineered by his university colleague, poet Alexandru Lungu. Lungu plastered the drawings with labels proclaiming Păun as "not a peacock, but an angel". Art critics were also enthusiastic; for example, Ion Frunzetti praised “the attitude of artistic probity and authenticity that emanates from [the work] of this impassioned [conveyor] of human nightmare.” In September 1946, Păun exhibited, alongside Luca and Trost, his ink and pencil drawings at Căminul Artei gallery, Bucharest, and co-wrote, with the four other group members, its catalog, L'Infra-Noir: préliminaires à une intervention sur-thaumaturgique dans la conquête du désirable (The Infra-black...). His art, some of which is semi-abstract but sometimes evoking anatomical drawings, intrigued chroniclers of the day, one of whom described Păun as "the most chaotic of the [Romanian surrealist] group [in the fight against] our daily logic". Of the figurative drawings, a few are portraits and many include nude figures, depicting strange and morbid occurrences in imaginary seascapes and fantasy gardens. He sent some of his works as postcards to his friend the surrealist painter Victor Brauner (who by then was living in Paris, having escaped Pétain's war-time regime), one of them with the message: "I am moved by your presence in all of my dreams."

According to some interpretations, similar to the brief inter-war political positioning of André Breton's surrealism, the Romanian branch had grown politicized in the 1940s, and recovered proletkult themes: Luca was referencing dialectical materialism, claiming that surrealism offered a perfect recipe against "right-wing deviations". In their 1945 essay, Dialectique de la dialectique (Dialectic of Dialectics) (Bucharest, S Surréalisme [series]), Trost and Luca decried the "imperialist war," criticized Breton for failing to keep up with the progress of Hegelian and Marxist dialectics, and demanded a theoretical reexamination of surrealism. Naum, Teodorescu, and Păun's manifesto of the same year, Critica mizeriei ("The Critique of Misery") (Bucharest, "Surrealist Collection"), which in a footnote criticized Luca for "mysticism," has also been considered inspired by proletkult. However, according to a different perspective, the group by and large, while holding on to a leftist orientation, had in fact by then moved away from a Marxist view of social change and direct political involvement, working instead toward a revolution from within. This is evidenced by their collective 1946 text ("Infra-noir: Préliminaires..."), analyzed in this light by Eburne in Yaari, ed., under a motto taken from Păun's 1947 La Conspiration du silence: "The Revolution is ungraspable." According to Yaari, this second view applies to Păun as well, who, in the somewhat hermetic style that had become characteristic of the group, wrote, also in 1947, in Les Esprits animaux: "only the systematic blinding toward the partial lights of the has-been, of political and theoretical déjà-vus, will provide us with the (magic) practical freedom of influencing the future with our movements. It is the dialectics of despair, its miracle, that sets now automatic action against the conspiracy of asphyxiation [...]". Along the same lines Virgil Ierunca states: "The books he published in 1947 are among the last challenges addressed to the communist regime, which henceforth would no longer tolerate a literature independent from the Jdanovist dogma."

By 1947, the Romanian surrealists were in direct contact with Breton, who, thanks to Brauner's intervention, included their French-language collective text, "Le Sable nocturne" ("Nocturnal Sand") in the catalogue of the 1947 Paris international surrealist exhibition (see also Chénieux-Gendron, in Yaari, ed.). As Breton supposedly noted that year, Bucharest had become the capital of worldwide surrealism. Also in 1947, in addition to his two volumes of French-language poetic prose, both in the Infra-Noir Collection, Les Esprits animaux ("The Animal Spirits") and La Conspiration du silence ("The Conspiracy of Silence"), Păun contributed to the "Group of Five"'s volume Éloge de Malombra ("Malombra's Eulogy"). It was in part a tribute to the 1942 film and the character played by Isa Miranda, echoes of which, according to Hasan, may also be discerned in Păun's ink drawings (see Friedman's analysis of the Éloge in Yaari, ed.).

The imposition of a communist regime, occurring in stages after 1946, was a bitter disappointment for the surrealist group. They found themselves confronted with socialist realism, political censorship, and erotic conventionalism: some of the group's members were prevented from publishing until the liberalization of 1964. Păun teamed with Luca, Trost, and, according to one account, Celan, in a common attempt to escape the country before the borders were sealed; the attempt failed, but Celan managed to flee in 1947. Teodorescu adapted himself and his style, and, a poet laureate, was even elected a member of the Romanian Academy. Turning to translation work and children's literature, Naum infused his conventional poetry with surrealist elements, before making a full return to the avant-garde in the liberal year 1968. Luca and Trost both managed to leave legally for France via Israel in the early 1950s, where their earlier friendship degenerated into outright enmity: Trost declared Luca a "counterrevolutionary" (not in the Marxist sense, but in the sense of the surrealist “revolution” their group had attempted). Luca settled in Paris, where he found himself distanced by the group surrounding Breton, and his friendship with Breton took a while to develop.

=== Exile ===
Păun led a discreet existence in the communized state, with only rare signs of literary or graphic activity noted abroad, under the pen name of Yvenez (an anagram of the French venez-y, "come hither"). For a while, in the early 1950s, he tried to mediate between Luca and Trost, but unsuccessfully. He was finally allowed to emigrate in the early 1960s, settled in Haifa, and became integrated in Israeli society as a urologist and an artist with several exhibitions both there and in Europe (for example, see Stern). In continuing to draw he moved into full abstraction, his technique seeming to some commentators mysterious or resulting from the use of supposedly unusual utensils (possibly combs). In reality, all of his work is the result of his mastery of both pencil and pen and ink drawing, combined with the use of a magnifying glass. A final, self-published, volume of his poetic prose came out in Haifa in 1975. Called La Rose parallèle ("The Parallel Rose"), it is infused with the language of alchemy and Kabbalah mysticism.

In Romania, Păun's work remained the least publicized contribution to Romanian surrealism. Pană, writing under communism, included only minimal samples of his work in an anthology of Romanian avant-garde, careful not to draw any attention to "politically incorrect" facts such as Păun's emigration. Poorly reviewed by Alexandru Piru in 1968, Păun's work was rediscovered in the 1980s by Marin Mincu and Ion Pop. Păun was also embraced by the Romanian diaspora. Writing for Biro and Passeron's 1982 Dictionnaire général du surréalisme, the exile literary critic Virgil Ierunca noted: "neo-surrealism—and more precisely the triad Gherasim Luca–Paul Păun–D. Trost—represented not just a project of creative freedom [...], but also an ethics of limitless heroism". A small section of Plămânul sălbatec was translated into French by Dumitru Țepeneag, the neo-avant-garde poet. In 1983, Păun entered a dialogue with anticommunist poet and scholar Ștefan Baciu, and was interviewed by Baciu's MELE newsletter (one of the very rare interviews Păun ever gave).

Păun continued to exhibit his surrealist drawings in Israel and France. In 1985, he had a show of "Infra-noir Drawings" in Paris. A year later, his work was featured in the international exhibition La Planète affolée: Surréalisme, dispersion et influences, 1938-1947, Marseille. But it is in Paris that Păun had his last exhibition while still alive, in autumn 1989. He died on April 9, 1994, in Haifa. His wife survived him and, for a while, kept a correspondence with Sesto Pals, who would write to her details about his own and Păun's common experience at Alge. In old age, Păun had corresponded with Alexandru Lungu, who dedicated to him a posthumous homage in the Bonn magazine Argo.

Writing in 2001, Crohmălniceanu assessed that many of the surrealist circle's collective works, with Păun's own contributions, remained "almost entirely unknown," which is no longer the case. Păun did maintain an enduring presence in the poetry of his colleagues: with the surrealist preference for intertextuality and autofiction, he made appearances in poems by Luca and had an epitaph written by Pals. In 2010, 20 of his drawings were donated to the Romanian Academy Library, and became the object of studies by art professionals. A year later, samples of his art were included in a Romanian avant-garde retrospective at the Israel Museum after the Jewish Historical Museum in Amsterdam (see Stern). Some of his drawings and papers, kept in Teodorescu's personal collection, were improperly preserved after the latter's death in 1987, and are presumed lost.

== Literary work ==
In his early youth, Păun declared that his poems from that period could only be read at the top of one's voice—a demand that, according to literary historian Geo Șerban, may show Păun's debt at the time to Russian Futurism. As Crohmălniceanu notes, works such as "Poem cu părul meu sălbatic" and the Viața Imediată manifesto were heavily indebted to Geo Bogza, whereas Plămânul sălbatec, which still made references to "social revolt", was nevertheless "at the antipodes of [Bogza's] 'elementary poetry'." According to the literary reviewer at Revista Fundațiilor Regale, Plămânul sălbatec was "confusing" and "prolix", with echoes from Sergei Yesenin and Vladimir Mayakovsky, but with individual "qualities worth noting"—such as "a convincing and robust literary impetus." The same was noted at the time by Banuș: "Lots of temperament, and intensity, and expressive power, and assurance in using a quite varied material. But amorphous. Poetry is not, alas, what this is. Poetry is a mystery, one that can be performed by any religion, but which requires one to respect its inner rites."

Today's readers are more positive toward Plămânul sălbatec than was the budding, more traditional poetess. Ion Pop considered it “Whitmanesque.” Magliocco, while considering the earlier texts as "minor experiments," "well-constructed mechanisms destined to shock 'the bourgeoisie,'" finds in Plămânul sălbatec similarities with the more famous works of Benjamin Fondane and Yvan Goll. The moral of the work, he argues is: "a desegregation of the Self. The dissolution of one's identity, also a destruction and a rebirth of one's own poetic verb." Also impressed with the poem, Crohmălniceanu evidences its "cyphered lyricism" and "fresh associations":

Te iubesc, femeia mea,
te iubesc
cum iubește asasinul carnea și cuțitul.

Translation:

I love you, my woman,
I love you
like the assassin loves the flesh and the knife.

But it is especially Marea palidă that earned Crohmălniceanu's praise: "a little poème-fleuve of a strange beauty, whose erotically charged atmosphere and bizarre imagery place it clearly on the surrealist lyric map." Crohmălniceanu also notes that, as surrealist and French-language pieces, the volumes published in the Infra-Noir series "easily slide into a conceptual prose of the essay type", with eulogies to Love and The Air. In Malombra, Păun and his colleagues invented a female erotic archetype, the "pure love of the absolute essence", which (critic Cristian Livescu notes), "meant to substitute to the plain woman, the predictable, limited woman". The authors exclaimed: "Never have we been so dazed, so seduced by the difficulty of elevating the revolution to the heights of poetry".

The surrealistic imprint was still visible on Păun's poetry and art during all of his mature years. According to Crohmălniceanu, with the Kabbalistic language of La Rose parallèle, Păun reinterpreted some of the core themes of Jewish mythology, in the same spirit as the entire surrealist movement, which "believed in universal analogy and in the other principles of magic, especially the magic of the word." Examples are the eulogizing of Lilith as the Mother of Man, and the black moon personified:

Lilith la lune fumante domine les destins de ce vide
Lilah, Laila, nuit et lune en même temps, plus noire que la nuit, plus creuse que le vide

Translation:

Lilith the smoky moon towers over the destinies of this void
Lilah, Laila, at once night and moon, darker than night, emptier than the void

Most importantly, as Crohmălniceanu points out, Păun's "graphic work cannot be separated from his poetic works, together constituting a valuable whole."
