= Vision dans le cristal. Oniromancie obsessionelle. Et neuf graphomanies entoptiques. =

1945 book by Dolfi Trost

Vision dans le cristal. Oniromancie obsessionelle. Et neuf graphomanies entoptiques. is a 1945 book by Romanian Dolfi Trost. The book forms part of his surrealist art theory, specifically on the area of entopic graphomania, a surrealist technique invented by the author. As the title suggests, it contains the first nine examples of the technique. This method of "indecipherable writing" was supposedly an example of "surautomatism", the controversial theory put forward by Trost and Gherashim Luca in which surrealist methods would be practiced that "went beyond" automatism.

== First edition ==
- Bucarest (Les Éditions de l'Oubli), 1945
