= St. Eleftherios Church =

St. Eleftherios Church may refer to one of two churches in Bucharest, Romania:

- New St. Eleftherios Church
- Old St. Eleftherios Church
