= Infrablack =

Infrablack may refer to:

- L'infra-noir ("Infra-Black" 1946), an exhibition of Romanian surrealists Ghérasim Luca, Paul Păun, Dolfi Trost, and Caminul Artei
- L'infra-noir ("Infra-Black" 1947), collection, co-written by Gellu Naum, Gherasim Luca, Paul Păun, Virgil Teodorescu, and Dolfi Trost
- Infra Noir (1972) by Claude Pélieu
- Infrablack, or dark light, a fictional color described in Good Omens by Terry Pratchett and Neil Gaiman
