= Jacques Hérold =

Romanian painter (1910–1987)

- Born: Jacques Hérold; 10 October 1910; Piatra Neamț, Romania
- Died: 11 January 1987 (aged 76); Paris, France
- Education: School of Fine Arts, Bucharest, Romania
- Known for: Painting, Drawing, Sculpture
- Movement: Surrealism, Tachisme

Jacques Hérold (born Herold Blumer; 10 October 1910 – 11 January 1987) was a prominent surrealist painter born in Piatra Neamț, Romania.

== Biography ==
Considered one of the most important late-period Surrealist painters, Hérold was born in a Jewish family in Piatra Neamț, Romania. He spent most of his childhood in the Danubian port city of Galați, where his father was making and selling candy. Between 1925 and 1927 he studied at a School of Fine Arts in Bucharest, against his father's will. After 2 years, he abandoned the Art Academy in 1929 and instead started working at an architecture bureau. In the same year he briefly contributed to a few Romanian Surrealist revues.

In 1930, he moved to France and, thanks to a fake ID, changed his name from Herold Blumer (his birth name) to Jacques Hérold. He settled in Paris, where he maintained a close friendship with Constantin Brâncuși, for whom he also worked as a chef or even secretary. He also met Surrealist painter Yves Tanguy, thanks to whom Hérold was allowed in Breton's group, participating at games and contributing with paintings that were held in high esteem by the likes of Raoul Ubac or Andre Breton himself.

After the tensioned period of World War II, he managed to have his first solo exhibition in 1947. Starting with this year's "Exposition Internationale du Surréalisme", he had an active presence in all the important Surrealist exhibitions worldwide. After 1951 (when he also departed from Breton's group), his style increased in abstraction and would be associated later with Lyrical abstraction and Tachisme. In 1958 he published the book Maltraité de peinture and received the Copley Foundation prize. In 1959 he had an exhibition at the Tate Gallery from London. In 1972, a monographic exhibition at l'Abbaye de Royaumont. In 1986, one year before his death, he exhibited works at the Venice Biennale.

During his lifetime, Hérold has done cover artwork and illustrations for more than 80 books by the likes of Gherasim Luca, Tristan Tzara, Francis Ponge, Julien Gracq, Marquis de Sade, Michel Butor, Alain Bosquet, Gellu Naum, Ilarie Voronca, Claude Sernet, etc. In 1995, Art critic Sarane Alexandrian published the essay book Jacques Hérold. Étude historique et critique.

== Individual exhibitions ==
- 1947 Paris, Galerie Cahiers d’Art
- 1948 New York, Galerie Julius Carlebach
- 1949 San Francisco, M. H. de Young Memorial Museum
- 1951 Bruxelles, Galerie Ex-Libris

Wuppertal, Galerie Parnass

- 1952 Francfort, Zimmergalerie Franck
- 1954 Paris, Galerie Furstenberg
- 1957 Bruxelles, Palais des Beaux-Arts
- 1959 Paris, La Cour d’Ingres
- 1960 Wuppertal, Galerie Parnass
- 1965 Paris, Au Pont des Arts
- 1966 Marseille, Galerie Garibaldi

Milan, Galleria Milano

- 1968 Lacoste, Galerie Les Contards
- 1970 Paris, Au Pont des Arts

Turin, Galerie Il Fauno

- 1971 Bonnieux, Galerie du Haut Bonnieux

Montauban, Maison du Peuple

- 1972 Paris, Galerie de Seine

Asnières-sur-Oise, Abbaye de Royaumont

- 1973 Helsinki, Galerie Christel
- 1974 Milan, Galleria Annunciata
- 1975 Beyrouth, Gallery One
- 1977 Paris, Galerie de Seine
- 1978 Paris, Galerie des Grands Augustins
- 1979 Paris, Galerie B.I.M.C.
- 1980 Monte Carlo, Galerie Le Point

Paris, Galerie de Larcos

- 1981 Florence, Institut Français

Florence, Galerie Saletta Gonnelli

- 1982 Rome, Centre culturel français

Rome, Studio Zebra

- 1984 Séoul, Galerie de Séoul
- 1985 Paris, Galerie Patrice Trigano

Paris, Galerie Arenthon

- 1987 Saint-Brieuc, Centre d’Action Culturelle
- 1990 Paris, Galerie La Pochade
- 1996 Thonon-les-Bains, Maison des Arts : Jacques Hérold - Le surréalisme et après
- 2006 Paris, Galerie Marion Meyer et Galerie 1900 - 2000
- 2010 Marseille, Musée Cantini : Jacques Hérold et le surréalisme.

== Main group exhibitions ==
- 1931 Paris, Galerie de la Renaissance : Salon « 1940 »
- 1936 Paris, Salon des Surindépendants
- 1938 Paris, Salon des Surindépendants
- 1939 Paris, Salon des Indépendants

Paris, Galerie contemporaine : Le rêve dans l’art et la littérature

- 1944 Paris, Salon d’Automne : Groupe Surréaliste
- 1945 Paris, Salon d’Automne -

Paris, Salon des Surindépendants -
Bruxelles, Galerie des Éditions La Boétie : Surréalisme

- 1946 Paris, Galerie Denise René, D’Ingres à nos jours

Paris, Galerie Pierre : Hommage à Antonin Artaud
Paris, Salon des Surindépendants

- 1947 Paris, Galerie Maeght : Le Surréalisme en 1947

Prague, Topicov Salon : Surrealismo internazionale
Paris, Salon des Surindépendants

- 1948 Paris, Galerie Nina Dausset : Le Cadavre exquis, son exaltation
- 1949 Paris, Galerie Nina Dausset : Surréalisme, documents inédits
- 1950 Malmoe : Phases

Londres, Institut of Contemporary Arts : London-Paris

- 1951 Liège, Musée de Liège : La peinture française au Musée de Liège, nouvelles acquisitions

Tokyo, Exposition internationale

- 1952 Saarebrücken, Saarland Museum : Surrealistische Malerei in Europa -
- 1953 Ostende, Kursaal : Art Fantastique
- 1954 Paris, Studio Facchetti : Phases

Lima, Galeria de Lima : Pinturas Surrealistas

- 1955 Paris, Galerie Creuze : Phases de l’art contemporain
- 1957 Otterlo, Museum Kröller-Müller, et Liège, Musée des Beaux-Arts : Collection Urvater

Paris, Salon de Mai (et les suivants jusqu’en 1968)

- 1958 Paris, Musée d’Art Moderne
- 1959 Milan, Galerie Schwarz : Mostra surrealista internazionale

Paris, Galerie Daniel Cordier : Exposition internationale du Surréalisme (EROS)

- 1960 New York, D’Arcy Galleries : International Surrealist Exhibition
- 1961 Besançon, Palais Granvelle : Surréalistes et précurseurs
- 1962 Paris, Galerie La Cour d’Ingres : Lam, Paalen, Hérold
- 1963 Paris, Galerie Le Point Cardinal : Collages surréalistes
- 1964 Paris, Galerie Charpentier : Le Surréalisme. Sources, Histoire, Affinités

Gand, Musée des Beaux-Arts : Figuration Défiguration - La figure humaine depuis Picasso

- 1965 Paris, Galerie L’œil : L’écart absolu

Sao Paulo, Museu de Arte Moderna, VIIIe Biennale : Surrealismo e Arte fantastica

- 1966 Rio de Janeiro, Museu de Arte Moderna : Surrealismo e Arte fantastica.

Tel Aviv, Musée d’art moderne : Le Surréalisme
Berne, Kunsthalle : Phantastische Kunst Surrealismus

- 1967 Cuba, Musée de La Havane, Sélection du Salon de Mai
- 1968 Knokke - Le Zoute, Kursaal : Trésors du Surréalisme
- 1969 Avignon, Palais des Papes : L’œil écoute
- 1971 Bordeaux, Musée des Beaux-Arts : Surréalisme
- 1972 Munich, Haus des Kunst : Der Surrealismus

Paris, Musée des Arts décoratifs : Le Surréalisme

- 1973 Paris, Galerie de Seine : Philippe Soupault, Collection fantôme
- 1974 Milan, Galerie Annunciata : Maestri del Surrealismo

Château de Saint-Cirq-Lapopie : Aspects du Surréalisme

- 1976 Paris, Galerie des Grands Augustins : Rituel surréaliste

Bruxelles, Galerie Govaerts : Les demeures d’Hypnos

- 1978 Zurich, Kunsthaus, Le musée en tiroirs.
- 1979 Paris, Galerie de Seine et Bruxelles, Galerie Isy Brachot : Le Musée volé de Michel Lancelot
- 1980 Marseille, Musée Cantini : Cantini 80
- 1981 Lyon, ELAC : Permanence du regard surréaliste

Paris, Musée National d’Art Moderne - Centre Georges Pompidou : Paris - Paris, 1937-1957

- 1982 Paris, Galerie de Seine : Surréalisme et Abstraction 1921-1960
- 1983 Paris, Galerie 1900-2000 : Trajectoires 1905 – 1983
- 1984 Washington, Hirshorn museum : Artistic collaboration in the 20th Century
- 1985 Liège, Musée d’Art Moderne : Voir avec Michel Butor
- 1986 Venise : Biennale de Venise -

Marseille, La Vieille Charité : La Planète affolée
Paris, Galerie Artcurial : L’aventure surréaliste autour d’André Breton

- 1989 Milan, Palazzo Reale : I Surrealisti, a cura di Arturo Schwarz /
- 1991 Paris, Musée National d’Art Moderne - Centre Georges Pompidou : André Breton, la beauté convulsive.
- 2011 Saint-Louis, Alsace, Espace d'Art Contemporain Fernet-Branca : Chassé-Croisé Dada-Surréaliste 1916–1969.

== Works in French and foreign museums ==
- Brussels, Royal Museums of Fine Arts of Belgium : Le nu fou, oil on canvas, 1964.
- Céret, Musée d’Art Moderne : Les poussées contradictoires, oil on canvas, 1957.
- Jérusalem, The Israel Museum : Sans titre, oil on cardboard, 1934.
- Liège, Musée d’Art Moderne : L’incendie, oil on panel, 1948.
- Marseille, Musée Cantini : Les Têtes, oil on canvas, 1939 / Sans titre, oil on canvas, 1940 / Dessin collectif, 1940 / Two drawings of playing cards for Le Jeu de Marseille, 1941 / La terre, la nuit, oil on canvas, 1965.
- New York, Museum of Modern Art : Cadavre exquis, 1934.
- Paris, Musée National d’Art Moderne, Centre Georges Pompidou : Le rouge en flamme, le noir en voûte, oil on panel, 1947 / Cadavre exquis, 1941. Paris,
- Musée d’Art Moderne de la Ville de Paris : Une flamme sur la nuque, oil on canvas, 1966.
- Rome, Galleria Nazionale d’Arte Moderna e Contemporanea : L’amour dans la forêt, oil on canvas, 1976.
- Valence, Musée des Beaux-Arts : Poussières d’Afrique, oil on canvas, 1961.

== References and sources ==
Sources

- Benezit Dictionary of Artists, 2006, site Oxford Index (subscription or library membership required)
