= Aerography =

Aerography may refer to:

- Aerography (arts), a stencilling method in the visual arts

== See also ==
- Aerial photography, the taking of photographs from an aircraft
- Areography, geography of Mars
