= Surrealist automatism =

Art technique

André Masson. Automatic Drawing. (1924). Ink on paper, 9 1/4 × 8 1/8" (23.5 × 20.6 cm). Museum of Modern Art, New York

Surrealist automatism is a method of art-making in which the artist suppresses conscious control over the making process, allowing the unconscious mind to have great sway. This drawing technique was popularized in the early 1920s, by André Masson and Hans Arp.

== Origins ==
Automatism has taken on many forms: the automatic writing and drawing initially (and still to this day) explored by the surrealists can be compared to similar or parallel phenomena, such as the non-idiomatic improvisation. "Psychic automatism in its pure state" was how André Breton defined Surrealism, and while the definition has proved capable of expansion, automatism remains of prime importance in the movement.

Early 20th-century Dadaists, such as Hans Arp, made some use of this method through chance operations. Surrealist artists, most notably André Masson, adapted to art the automatic writing method of André Breton and Philippe Soupault who composed with it Les Champs Magnétiques (The Magnetic Fields) in 1919. The Automatic Message (1933) was one of Breton's significant theoretical works about automatism. However, tradition has the Israel Salanter, who died in 1883, practiced automatic drawing by allowing his pen to scribble while giving lectures as means for insight into his subconscious [penimiut].

== Automatic drawing and painting ==
Automatic drawing (distinguished from automatic writing) is an artistic technique developed by surrealists in which the hand is allowed to move randomly across the paper. In applying chance and accident to mark-making, drawing is to a large extent freed of rational control. Hence the drawing produced may be attributed in part to the subconscious and may reveal something of the psyche, which would otherwise be repressed. Examples of automatic drawing were produced by mediums and practitioners of the psychic arts. It was thought by some Spiritualists to be a spirit control that was producing the drawing while physically taking control of the medium's body.

Automatic drawing was first written about by the English artist Austin Osman Spare who wrote a chapter, Automatic Drawing as a Means to Art, in his book, The Book of Pleasure (1913). Other artists who also practised automatic drawing were Hilma af Klint, André Masson, Joan Miró, Salvador Dalí, Jean Arp, André Breton and Freddy Flores Knistoff.

The technique of automatic drawing was transferred to painting (as seen in Miró's paintings which often started out as automatic drawings), and has been adapted to other media; there have even been automatic "drawings" in computer graphics. Pablo Picasso was also thought to have expressed a type of automatic drawing in his later work, and particularly in his etchings and lithographic suites of the 1960s.

Most of the surrealists' automatic drawings were illusionistic, or more precisely, they developed into such drawings when representational forms seemed to suggest themselves. In the 1940s and 1950s the French Canadian group called Les Automatistes pursued creative work (chiefly painting) based on surrealist principles. They abandoned any trace of representation in their use of automatic drawing. This is perhaps a more pure form of automatic drawing since it can be almost entirely involuntary – to develop a representational form requires the conscious mind to take over the process of drawing, unless it is entirely accidental and thus incidental. These artists, led by Paul-Émile Borduas, sought to proclaim an entity of universal values and ethics proclaimed in their manifesto Refus Global.

As alluded to above, surrealist artists often found that their use of "automatic drawing" was not entirely automatic; rather, it involved some form of conscious intervention to make the image or painting visually acceptable or comprehensible, "...Masson admitted that his 'automatic' imagery involved a two-fold process of unconscious and conscious activity...."

== Surautomatism ==
Some Romanian surrealists invented a number of surrealist techniques (such as cubomania, entoptic graphomania, and the movement of liquid down a vertical surface) that purported to take automatism to an absurd point, and the name given, "surautomatism", implies that the methods "go beyond" automatism, but this position is controversial.

== Paul-Émile Borduas ==
The notion of automatism is also rooted in the artistic movement of the same name founded by Montreal artist Paul-Émile Borduas in 1942; himself influenced by the Dadaist movement as well as André Breton. He, as well as a dozen other artists from Quebec's artistic scene, very much under restrictive and authoritarian rule in that period, signed the Global Refusal manifesto, in which the artists called upon North American society (specifically in the culturally unique environment of Quebec), to take notice and act upon the societal evolution projected by these new cultural paradigms opened by the Automatist movement as well as other influences in the 1940s.

== Contemporary techniques ==
The computer, like the typewriter, can be used to produce automatic writing and automatic poetry. The practice of automatic drawing, originally performed with pencil or pen and paper, has also been adapted to mouse and monitor, and other automatic methods have also been either adapted from non-digital media, or invented specifically for the computer. For instance, filters have been automatically run in some bitmap editor programs such as Photoshop and GIMP, and computer-controlled brushes have been used by Roman Verostko to simulate automatism. Grandview — a software application created in 2011 for the Mac — displays one word at a time across the entire screen as a user types, facilitating automatic writing.

== See also ==
- Asemic writing
- Automatic writing
- Cut-up technique
- Free improvisation
- Intuitive music
- Pareidolia
- Surrealist music
- Pseudohallucination
- Israel Salanter
