= Surautomatism =

Concept within surrealism

Surautomatism is any theory or act in practice of surrealist creative production taking, or purporting to take, automatism to its most absurd limits.

In their 1945 statement Dialectique de la Dialectique, Romanian surrealists Gherashim Luca and Dolfi Trost wrote,

We have returned to the problem of knowledge through images... by establishing a clear distinction between images produced by artistic means and images resulting from rigorously applied scientific procedures, such as the operation of chance or of automatism. We stand opposed to the tendency to reproduce, through symbols, certain valid theoretical contents by the use of pictorial techniques, and believe that the unknown that surrounds us can find a staggering materialization of the highest order in indecipherable images. In generally accepting until now pictorial reproductive means, surrealist painting will find that the way to its blossoming lies in the absurd use of aplastic, objective and entirely non-artistic procedures.

The name surautomatism suggests "going beyond" automatism, but whether surautomatism is anything but a group of methods by which surrealist automatism is practiced is controversial.

Surautomatism includes cubomania, entopic graphomania and various types of what the Romanian surrealists called "indecipherable writing".

== See also ==
- Dialectique de la dialectique
- Surrealist techniques
- Writing

== Sources ==
- The Language of Surrealism The Language of Surrealism
- Historical Dictionary of Surrealism Historical Dictionary of Surrealism pp. 304, 455, 476.
- Sacred Surrealism, Dissidence and International Avant-Garde Prose Sacred Surrealism, Dissidence and International Avant-Garde Prose
- Architectural Draughtsmanship: From Analog to Digital Narratives Architectural Draughtsmanship: From Analog to Digital Narratives
