= Dialectique de la dialectique =

1945 book by Gherasim Luca and Dolfi Trost

Dialectique de la dialectique is a 1945 text publication by Romanian surrealists Gherasim Luca and Dolfi Trost. Its subtitle was Message to the International Surrealist Movement. Like the artists previous work, it was largely based on surrealist theory and the sustainance of the surrealist movement.

It called for the preservation of the surrealist movement in a "constantly revolutionary state" to counter the decline of the movement. It begins by criticising the then movement's "artistic deviation" and "the petrification of its revolutionary effort". Following this, it makes a statement as to how artists can counter this: by "constantly surpass[ing] itself". Love is declared to be the "principal method of knowledge and action" for the artists. Finally, the artists declare the need to "revolt against nature and dissolving the oedipal complex in order to liberate love".

== See also ==
- Surautomatism
