= New St. Eleftherios Church =

Heritage site in Bucharest, Romania

- The church seen from the south

Religion
- Affiliation: Christian
- Rite: Eastern Orthodox
- Status: active

Location
- Location: Bucharest, Romania
- Interactive map of New St. Eleftherios Church
- Coordinates: 44°26′0.82″N 26°4′36.94″E

Architecture
- Architect: Constantin Iotzu
- General contractor: Dumitru Marcu
- Completed: 1971
- Materials: Reinforced concrete, bricks

Website
- https://sfelefterie.ro/

New St. Eleftherios Church (Romanian: Biserica Sfântul Elefterie Nou) is a church near the Opera House in Bucharest, Romania. It is located at 1 Saint Elefterie Street and was designed by the architect Constantin Iotzu. This is the new church, as there is an older church by the same name nearby. It was named after the Saint Eleftherios.

== Gallery ==
Column detail

Exterior

One of the entrance doors

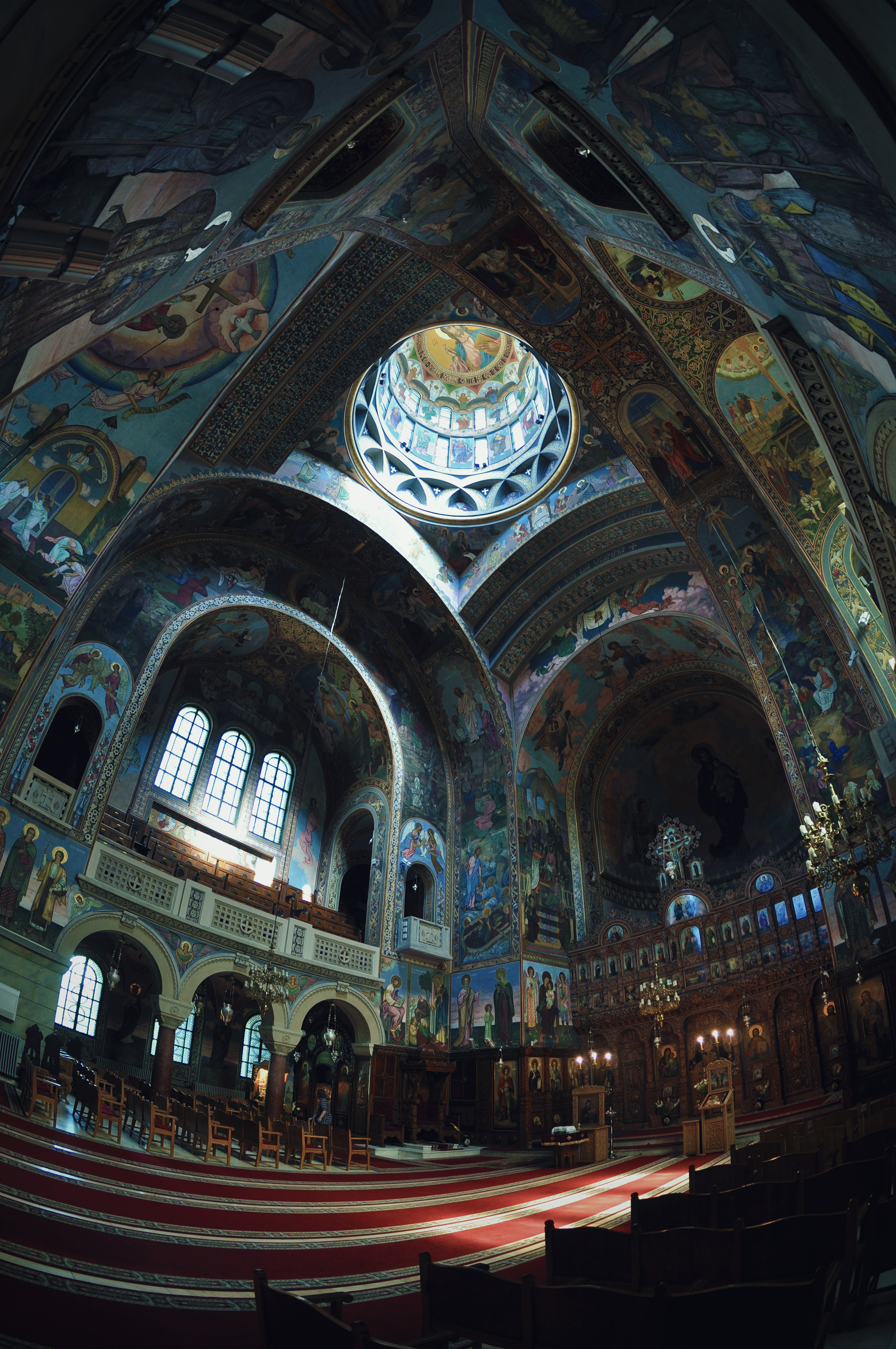
Inside the church
