= Maria Banuș =

Romanian poet, essayist, prose writer and translator (1914–1999)

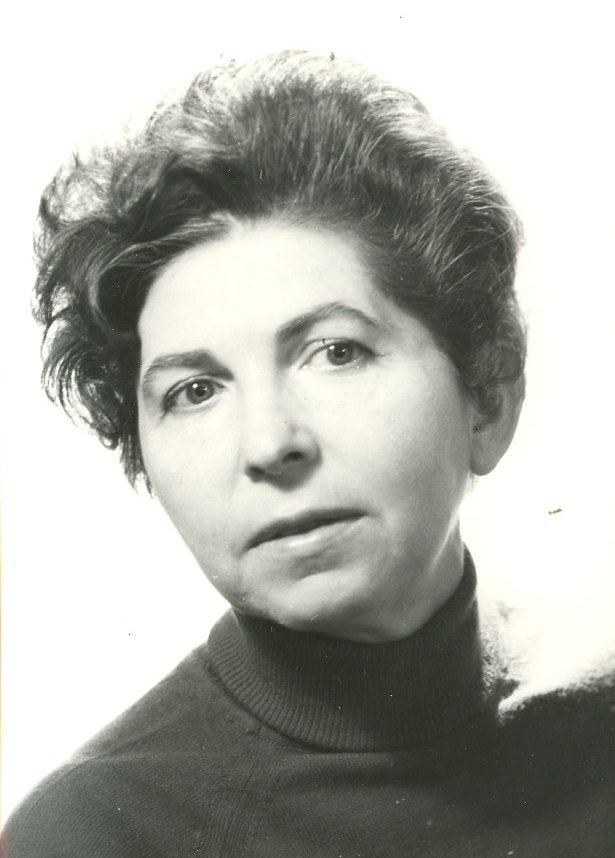
- Born: Marioara Banuș; April 10, 1914; Bucharest, Kingdom of Romania
- Died: July 14, 1999 (aged 85); Bucharest, Romania
- Resting place: Filantropia Cemetery, Bucharest
- Education: University of Bucharest
- Occupations: Poet, essayist, prose writer, translator
- Writing career
- Years active: 1928–1989
- Genre: Socialist realism
- Notable awards: Order of the Star of the Romanian Socialist Republic; Herder Prize

Maria Banuș (born Marioara Banuș; April 10, 1914 – July 14, 1999) was a Romanian poet, essayist, prose writer, and translator.

She was born into a Jewish family in Bucharest, and her parents were Max Banuș, an accountant and later a director at the Carol Street branch of Marmorosch Blank Bank, and his wife Anette (née Marcus). Due to her fragile health, she began primary school with private lessons, taking tests at the Lucaci Street School from 1920 to 1923. She attended high school at the Pompilian Institute from 1923 to 1931, and from 1931 to 1934, studied at the University of Bucharest's faculties of law and literature. She made her published debut as an adolescent, with the poem "14 ani", which appeared in Bilete de Papagal in 1928, under her birth name Marioara Banuș. In 1932, while she was a student, her poems appeared in Zaharia Stancu's Azi magazine, as did her translations from Rainer Maria Rilke and Arthur Rimbaud. It was Stancu who changed her given name to Maria.

Her first book, Țara fetelor, appeared to cordial reviews in 1937. The 1939 Poeme includes selections of her own verses as well as translations from Rilke. At that point, she ceased writing and entered the anti-fascist movement that unfolded under the aegis of the banned Romanian Communist Party, an experience recalled in the diary of which she published fragments in 1977, as Sub camuflaj. The World War II-era Ion Antonescu regime officially banned her entire work as "Jewish".

After the war and with the rise of the communist regime, she entered opinion journalism, writing for Gazeta literară, Contemporanul, Steaua and Viața Românească. Her books Bucurie (1949), Despre pământ, (1954), Ție-ți vorbesc, Americă (1955), and Se arată lumea (1956) were expressions of the regime's officially sanctioned socialist realism. She used animal epithets to depict the former elite of the "bourgeois-landlord regime," from politicians to industrialists and kulaks, and foreign enemies, with a place of honor reserved for British and American "imperialists" ("the packs hungry for a new war", "cursed high-born dogs ready to murder", "let the ravens learn", "nothing scares me, neither the snakes, nor the jackals"). These writings brought her prizes and medals, public recognition, publication in schoolbooks and translation into foreign languages, as well as lavish praise from subservient critics such as Dumitru Micu, but also Tudor Vianu. During this period, she translated poets favored by the authorities (Pablo Neruda, Nâzım Hikmet, Nikola Vaptsarov), as well as fine versions of classic authors such as William Shakespeare, Alexander Pushkin and Johann Wolfgang von Goethe. She wrote several short poetry books in the same style: Torentul (1957), Poezii (1958), Magnet (1962), Metamorfoze (1963), and Diamantul (1965).

In the mid-1960s, Banuș underwent a significant break with her earlier style, causing her to re-evaluate her politics as well as the proper role of the artist. The subsequent volumes, starting with Tocmai ieșeam din arenă (1967), Portretul din Fayum (1970) and Oricine și ceva (1972), and through Orologiu cu figuri (1984) or Carusel (1989), showcase some of her recurring themes, but also emphasize the presence of a profoundly altered universe, expressed tragically or playfully and underscoring the extent of her lyricism. Her 1980 Himera includes short evocative prose pieces, essays and confessions; her two plays (Ziua cea mare, 1951; Oaspeți de la mansardă, 1978) are insignificant. She published anthologies of German poetry (1969), modern Austrian poetry (1970) and worldwide love poetry (1974; 1987). She won the Romanian Academy's George Coșbuc Prize in 1949, the State Prize in 1951, the Order of the Star of the Romanian Socialist Republic 3rd class in 1971, the special prize of the Romanian Writers' Union in 1986, and the Herder Prize in 1989.

Banuș died in Bucharest in 1999 and was buried in the city's Filantropia Cemetery.
