= Surrealist techniques =

Techniques used in surrealism

Surrealism in art, poetry, and literature uses numerous techniques and games to provide inspiration. Many of these are said to free imagination by producing a creative process free of conscious control. The importance of the unconscious as a source of inspiration is central to the nature of surrealism.

The Surrealist movement has been a fractious one since its inception. The value and role of the various techniques has been one of many subjects of disagreement. Some Surrealists consider automatism and games to be sources of inspiration only, while others consider them starting points for finished works. Others consider the items created through automatism to be finished works themselves, needing no further refinement.

== Aerography ==
Aerography was innovative media used by Man Ray in a series of paintings over the period from 1917 to 1919. "Seguidilla" (1919) is one of these pictures.

Aerography is a technique in which a 3-dimensional object is used as a stencil with spraypainting. Both conceptually and technically the airbrush painting method presented a new point of departure from a traditional way of painting. Man Ray recalled, "(…) It was thrilling to paint a picture, hardly touching the surface - a purely cerebral act, as it were."

== Automatism ==
Automatism was used in different ways for each art:

- Automatic drawing
- Automatic painting
- Automatic writing
- Automatic poetry is poetry written using the automatic method. It has probably been the chief surrealist method from the founding of surrealism to the present day. One of the oddest uses of automatic writing by a great writer was that of W. B. Yeats; his wife, a spiritualist, practised it, and Yeats put large chunks of it into his prose work, A Vision and much of his later poetry, but Yeats was not a surrealist. In French surrealism, André Breton and Philippe Soupault were often considered as the pioneers of this technique with their collection Les Champs magnétiques (1919), who claimed to be the first collection only written through the automatic method : but recent studies have proven the manuscripts showed many variants and corrections throughout the poems.

The Czech writer Bohumil Hrabal used the method of automatic text in his famous book I Served the King of England. One chapter in the book is written as a single sentence, and at the end of the book Hrabal endorses the use of automatic writing.

== Bulletism ==
Bulletism is shooting ink at a blank piece of paper. The artist can then develop images based on what is seen.

== Calligram ==
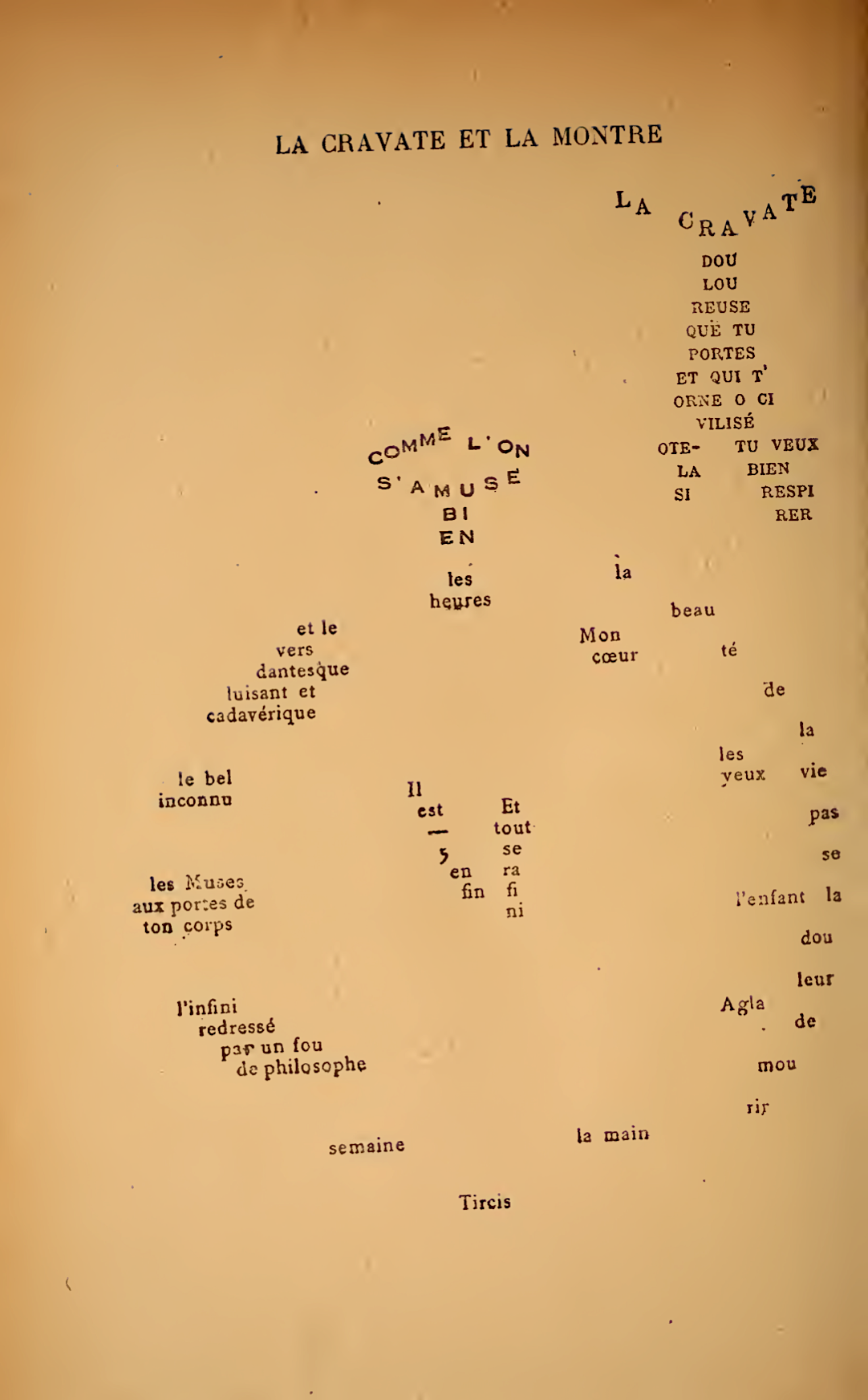
Calligramme "La cravate et la montre" (1914), by Guillaume Apollinaire, is an example of typographical poetry with the visual depiction of a tie and a watch. The pictorial effect of writing is an invitation to simultaneously process both the visual and verbal aspects of the poem.

A calligram is a text or poem of a type in which the words or letters make up a shape, particularly a shape connected to the subject of the text or poem. The concept was developed by Guillaume Apollinaire in his 1918 collection Calligrammes.

== Collage ==
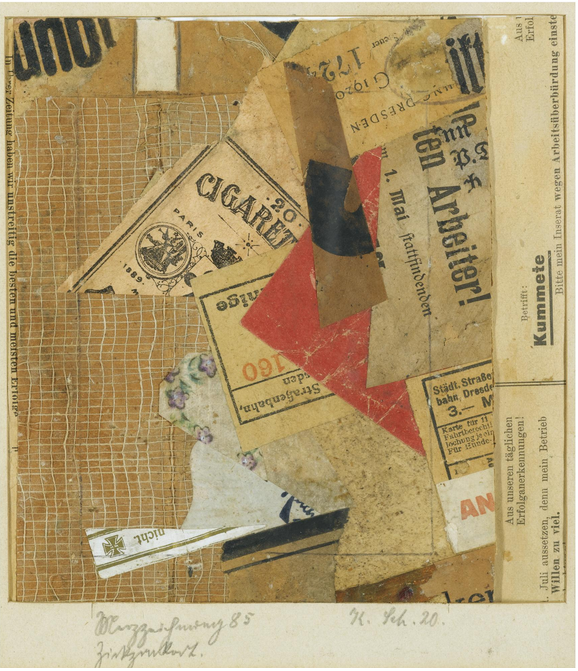
Collage “Merz-drawing 85, Zig-Zag Red” (1920), by Kurt Schwitters, composed with the fragments of scraps and torn papers clinching over the canvas

Collage is the assemblage of different forms creating a new whole. For example, an artistic collage work may include newspaper clippings, ribbons, bits of colored or hand-made papers, photographs, etc., glued to a solid support or canvas. Tearing papers can suggest an act of artistic experience, connoting an emotional or creative crisis.

== Coulage ==
A coulage is a kind of automatic or involuntary sculpture made by pouring a molten material (such as metal, wax, chocolate or white chocolate) into cold water. As the material cools it takes on what appears to be a random (or aleatoric) form, though the physical properties of the materials involved may lead to a conglomeration of discs or spheres. The artist may use a variety of techniques to affect the outcome.

This technique is also used in the divination process known as ceromancy.

== Cubomania ==
Cubomania is a method of making collages in which a picture or image is cut into squares and the squares are then reassembled without regard for the image. The technique was first used by the Romanian surrealist Gherasim Luca.

== Cut-up technique ==
Cut-up technique is a literary form or method in which a text is cut up at random and rearranged to create a new text.

== Decalcomania ==
Decalcomania is a process of spreading thick paint upon a canvas then—while it is still wet—covering it with further material such as paper or aluminium foil. This covering is then removed (again before the paint dries), and the resultant paint pattern becomes the basis of the finished painting. The technique was much employed by artists such as Max Ernst.

== Dream résumé ==
The dream résumé takes the form of an employment résumé but chronicles its subject's achievements, employment, or the like, in dreams, rather than in waking life. Sometimes dream résumés contain the achievements of both, however.

== Echo poem ==
An echo poem is a poem written using a technique invented by Aurélien Dauguet in 1972. The poem is composed by one or more persons, working together in a process as follows.

The first "stanza" of the poem is written on the left-hand column of a piece of paper divided into two columns. Then the "opposite", or 'echo', of the first stanza, in whatever sense is appropriate to the poem, is composed in the right-hand column of the page. The writing is done automatically and often the "opposite" stanza is composed of a phonetic correspondence to the first stanza.

For a longer work, the third stanza can then begin in the left-hand column as an "opposite" or a phonetic correspondence to what preceded it in the right-hand column. Then the fourth stanza might be an "opposite" or sound correspondence to what preceded it in the left-hand column, and so forth. When the poem is completed, the echo of the last phrase, line, or sentence, generally serves as the title.

This is unrelated to the non-Surrealist echo verse form which appears as a dialogue between the questions of a character and the answers of the nymph Echo.

== Éclaboussure ==
Éclaboussure is a process in Surrealist painting where oil paints or watercolors are laid down and water or turpentine is splattered, then soaked up to reveal random splatters or dots where the media was removed. This technique gives the appearance of space and atmosphere. It was used in paintings by Remedios Varo.

== Écrémage ==
An automatic technique in which paint or ink is floated on the surface of water before being skimmed off with paper or board. The technique was developed by Conroy Maddox.

== Entopic graphomania ==
Entopic graphomania is a surrealist and automatic method of drawing in which dots are made at the sites of impurities in a blank sheet of paper, and lines are then made between the dots; these can be either "curved lines... or straight lines". Ithell Colquhoun described its results as "the most austere kind of geometric abstraction." The technique aims to stimulate creative process and subconscious associations. It is to be distinguished from "entoptic" methods of drawing or art-making, inspired by entoptic phenomena.

The method was invented by Dolfi Trost, who as the subtitle of his 1945 book ("Vision dans le cristal. Oniromancie obsessionelle. Et neuf graphomanies entopiques") suggests, included nine examples therein. Trost believed in transformation of human consciousness through a dialectical process that can lead to a modification of human existence at both the personal and social level. This method of "indecipherable writing" was supposedly an example of "surautomatism", the controversial theory put forward by Trost and Gherashim Luca in which surrealist methods would be practiced that "went beyond" automatism. In Dialectique de Dialectique they had proposed the further radicalization of surrealist automatism by abandoning images produced by artistic techniques in favour of those "resulting from rigorously applied scientific procedures," allegedly cutting the notion of "artist" out of the process of creating images and replacing it with chance and scientific rigour. However, the question has arisen whether an algorithm should be used to determine in what order to connect the dots to maintain the "automatic" nature of the method.

The method has been compared to the "voronoi mathematical progression".

== Étrécissements ==
Collage is perceived as an additive method of visual poetry whereas Étrécissements are a reductive method. This was first employed by Marcel Mariën in the 1950s. The results are achieved by the cutting away of parts of images to encourage a new image, by means of a pair of scissors or any other manipulative sharpened instrument.

== Exquisite corpse ==
Exquisite corpse or Cadavre exquis is a method by which a collection of words or images are collectively assembled. It is based on an old parlour game known by the same name (and also as Consequences) in which players wrote in turn on a sheet of paper, folded it to conceal part of the writing, and then passed it to the next player for a further contribution.

== Frottage ==
Frottage is a method of creation in which one takes a pencil or other drawing tool and makes a "rubbing" over a textured surface. The drawing can either be left as it is or used as the basis for further refinement. The technique was developed in 1925 by Max Ernst, who was inspired by an ancient wooden floor where the grain of the planks had been accentuated by many years of scrubbing. The patterns of the graining suggested strange images to him. He captured these by laying sheets of paper on the floor and then rubbing over them with a soft pencil.

== Fumage ==
Fumage is a technique in which impressions are made by the smoke of a candle or kerosene lamp on a piece of paper or canvas. This technique was introduced by Wolfgang Paalen.

== Games ==
In Surrealism, games are important not only as a form of recreation but as a method of investigation. The intention is to cut away the constraints of rationalism and allow concepts to develop more freely and in a more random manner. The aim is to break traditional thought patterns and create a more original outcome.

Old games such as Exquisite corpse, and newer ones, notably Time Travelers' Potlatch and Parallel Collage, have played a critical role.

Exquisite corpse is a method by which a collection of words or images are collectively assembled, the result being known as the exquisite corpse or cadavre exquis in French. Later the game was adapted to drawing and collage.

Time Travelers' Potlatch is a game in which two or more players say what gift they would give to another person - this is usually an historical person who played a role in, or had an influence on, the formation of Surrealism.

== Grattage ==
Grattage is a surrealist technique in painting in which (usually wet) paint is scraped off the canvas. It was employed by Max Ernst and Joan Miró.

== Heatage ==
Heatage is an automatic technique developed and used by David Hare in which an exposed but unfixed photographic negative is heated from below, causing the emulsion (and the resulting image, when developed) to distort in a random fashion.

== Indecipherable writing ==
In addition to its obvious meaning of writing that is illegibile or for whatever other reason cannot be made out by the reader, indecipherable writing refers to a set of automatic techniques, most developed by Romanian surrealists and falling under the heading of surautomatism. Examples include entoptic graphomania, fumage and the movement of liquid down a vertical surface.

== Involuntary sculpture ==
Surrealism describes as "involuntary sculpture" those made by absent-mindedly manipulating something, such as rolling and unrolling a movie ticket, bending a paper clip, and so forth.

== Latent news ==
Latent news is a game in which an article from a newspaper is cut into individual words (or perhaps phrases) and then rapidly reassembled; see also Cut-up technique.

== Movement of liquid down a vertical surface ==
Pictures can be produced by dripping or allowing a flow of some form of liquid down a vertical surface. The technique was invented by surrealists from Romania and said by them to be surautomatic and a form of indecipherable writing.

== Paranoiac-critical method ==
Paranoiac-critical method is a technique invented by Salvador Dalí which consists of the artist invoking a paranoid state (fear that the self is being manipulated, targeted or controlled by others). The result is a deconstruction of the psychological concept of identity, such that subjectivity becomes the primary aspect of the artwork.

== Parsemage ==
Parsemage is a surrealist and automatic method in the visual arts invented by Ithell Colquhoun in which dust from charcoal or colored chalk is scattered on the surface of water and then skimmed off by passing a stiff paper or cardboard just under the water's surface.

== Photomontage ==
Photomontage is making of composite picture by cutting and joining a number of photographs.

== Sifflage ==
Sifflage is the technique used by Jimmy Ernst in which liquid paint is blown to inspire or reveal an image. This is sometimes called "soufflage", but Ernst's name was "sifflage". The result can be seen in his Echo Plasm.

== Surautomatism ==
Surautomatism is any theory or act of taking automatism to its most absurd limits.

== Triptography ==
Triptography is an automatic photographic technique whereby a roll of film is used three times (either by the same photographer or, in the spirit of Exquisite Corpse, three different photographers), causing it to be triple-exposed in such a way that the chances of any single photograph having a clear and definite subject is nearly impossible. Indeed, finding any edges on the negative itself during the developing process is a nearly impossible task. Typically the developing of such a roll of film is an exercise in automatic technique in and of itself, cutting the film by counting sprocket holes alone, with no regard for the images present on the negative. The results have a quality reminiscent of the transitory period in sleep when one dream suddenly becomes another.

== See also ==
- Creativity techniques
