= Old St. Eleftherios Church =

Heritage site in Bucharest, Romania

Coordinates: 44°25′59″N 26°04′28″E

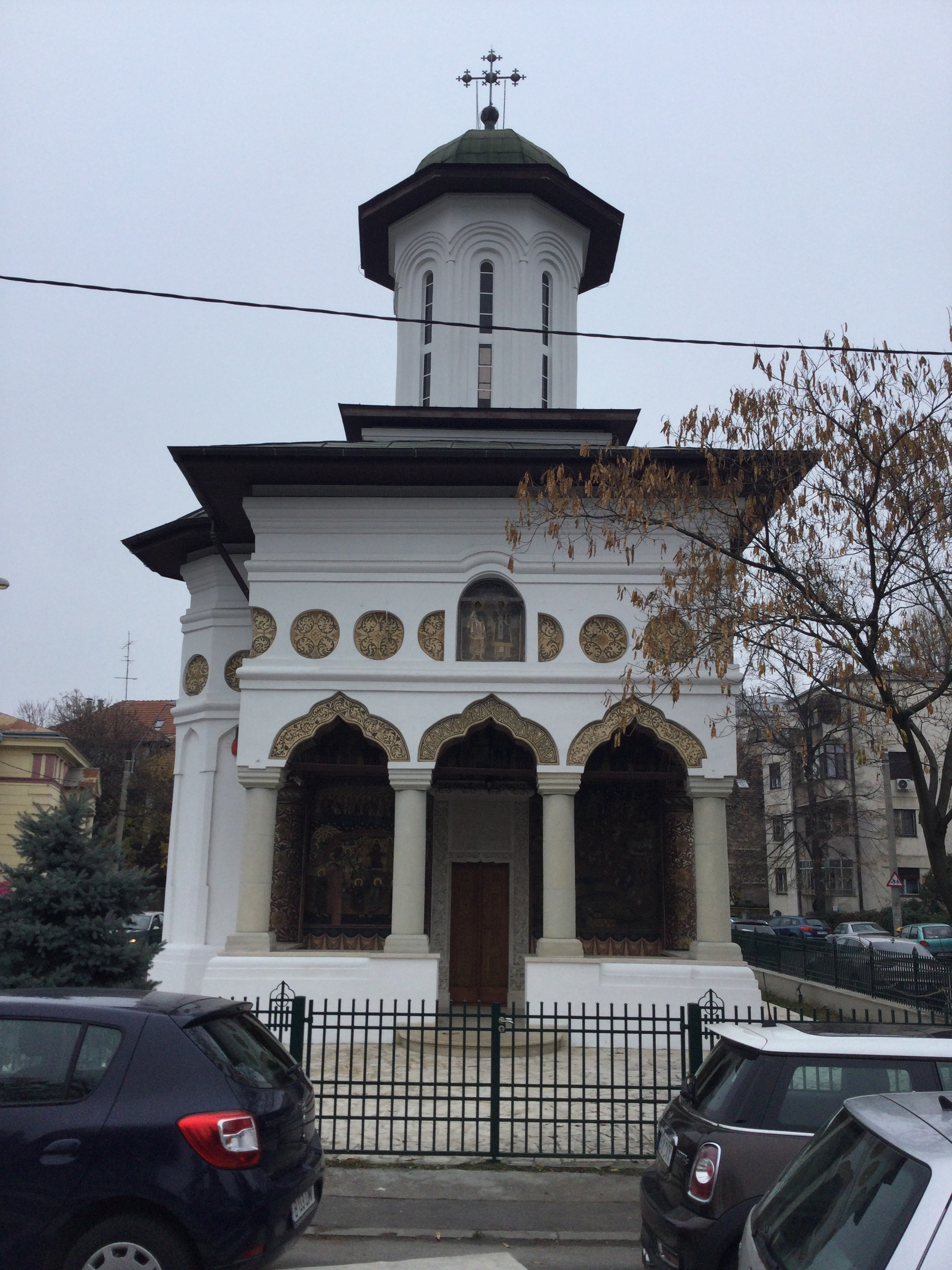
Old St. Eleftherios Church

The Old St. Eleftherios Church (Romanian: Biserica Sfântul Elefterie Vechi) is a Romanian Orthodox church located at 15B Sfântul Elefterie Street in Bucharest, Romania. It is dedicated to Saint Eleftherios and to Saint George.

The church was built in 1741–1744 on land belonging to the Metropolis of Ungro-Wallachia. The area was swampy, near a mill fed by the Dâmbovița River. In 1748, Prince Grigore II Ghica strengthened the church’s position, declaring it a metochion of the Metropolis. In 1782, the grandson of Constantin Brâncoveanu found it necessary to carry out repairs. Damaged by the 1802 earthquake, its administration was taken over by Metropolitan Dositei Filitti two years later, and he consolidated the structure. The 1838 tremor caused severe damage; it is not known whether this was immediately fixed, but it is recorded that the monastic cells were demolished in 1852–1856. In 1867, the church was transformed into a Greek Revival building, as per the prevailing fashion.

Restoration work began in 1929; Ștefan Balș-Lupu was in charge of architecture, while Paul Popescu Molda supervised the frescoes. The project finished in 1935, having consolidated the walls, redone the roof, restored the old cornice, opened the portico and brought back to light the exterior paintings. Around the same time, the surrounding street was straightened out and the church left on an island in the middle. The year 1935 saw the beginning of the New St. Eleftherios Church on land belonging to the old. The church was consolidated following the earthquakes of 1940 and 1977 (when the dome was rebuilt). Painting and structural repairs were carried out in 1982–1984.

The church is 19 meters long and 6.4 meters wide. It is cross-shaped, with a porch and enlarged narthex topped by a bell tower. The portico has three arches facing west and two larger ones to the north and south. These are separated by massive stone columns. The stone door frame is carved in post-Brâncovenesc style. The lower half of the facade features a series of scalloped arches, while the upper part includes painted bas-relief medallions. It has beautiful frescoes in the exonarthex.

Currently, the church is only used for special occasions, with regular services held in the new one.

The church is listed as a historic monument by Romania's Ministry of Culture and Religious Affairs; it acquired this status in 1915.

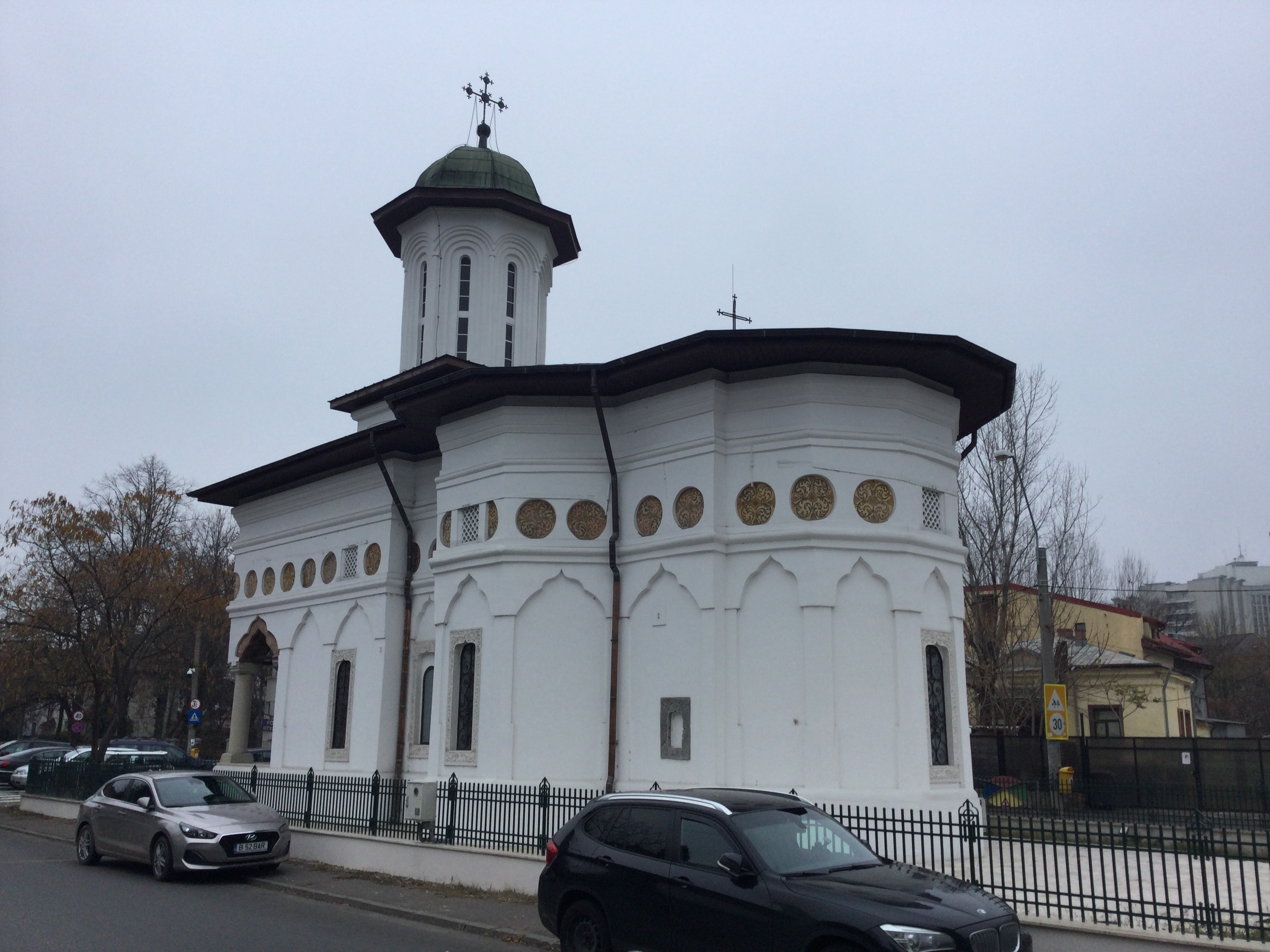
Side view

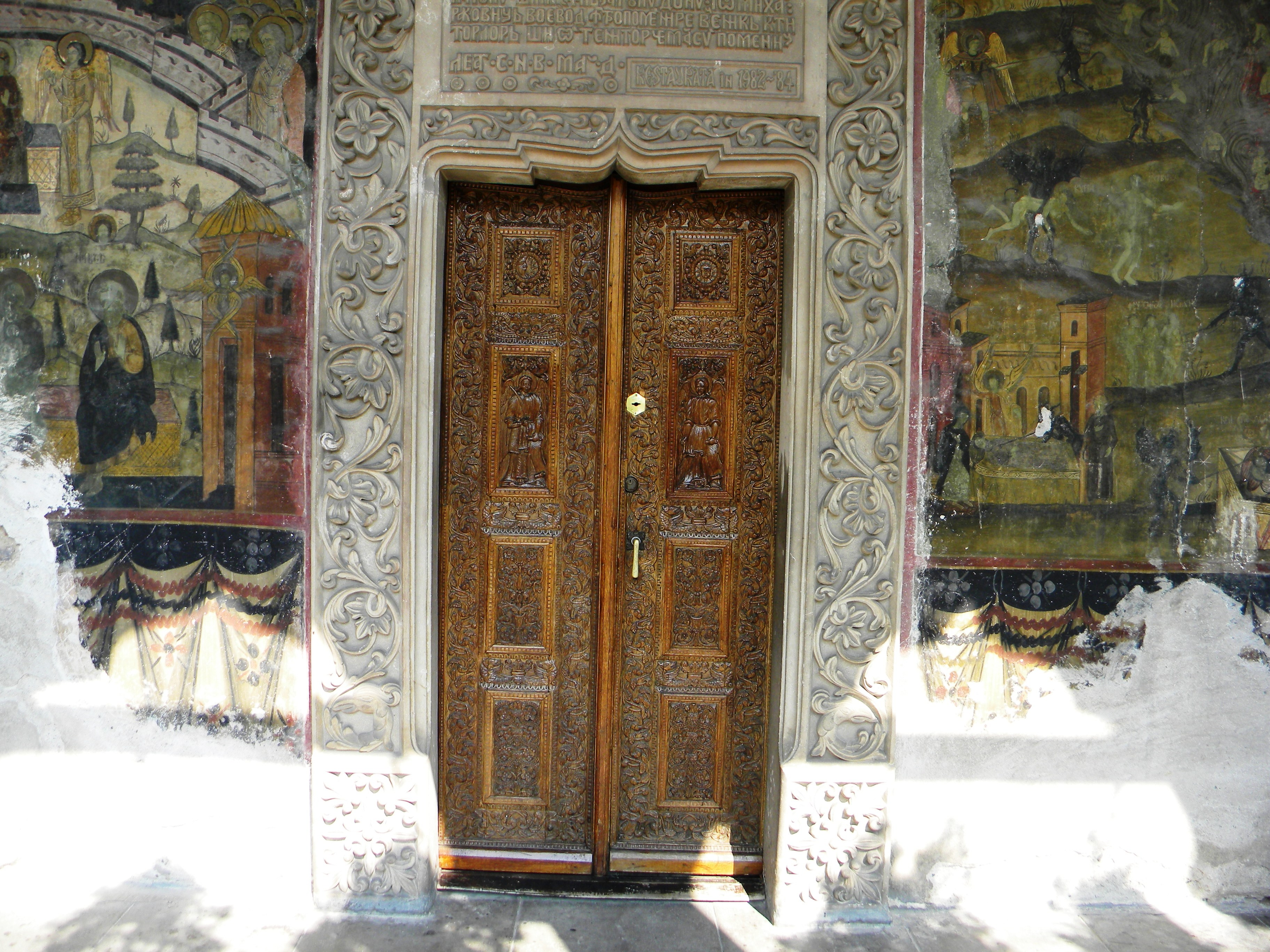
Entrance

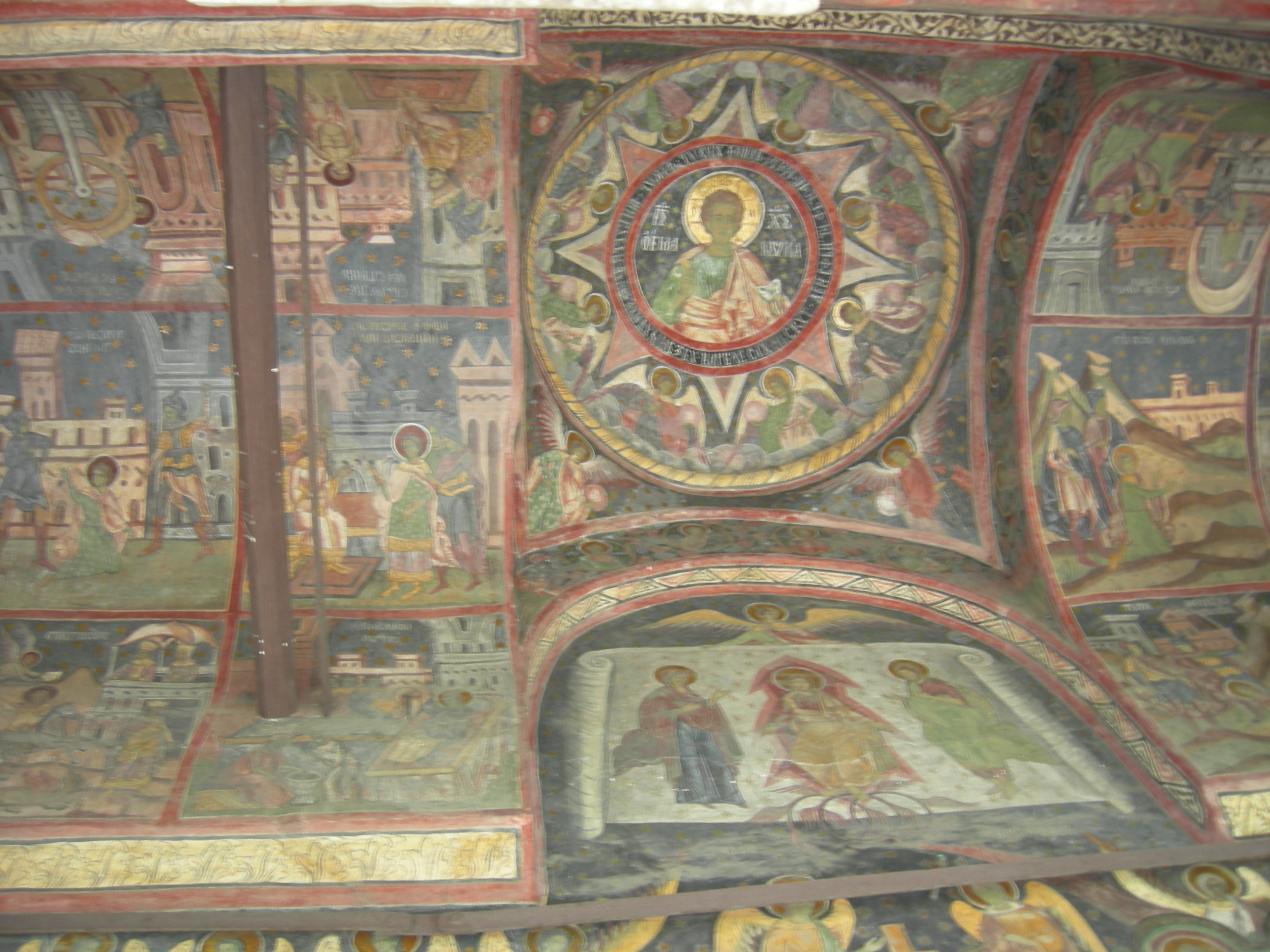
Portico ceiling
