= Dolfi Trost =

Romanian surrealist poet

Dolfi or Dolphi Trost (1916 in Brăila – 1966 in Chicago, Illinois) was a Romanian surrealist poet, artist, and theorist, and the instigator of entopic graphomania. Together with Gherasim Luca, he was the author of Dialectique de la dialectique (1945). He also authored a work entitled Le même du même.

He also wrote the book, Vision dans le cristal. Oniromancie obsessionelle. Et neuf graphomanies entoptiques. as part of his surrealist art theory.

In 1941, Trost and Luca were among the founders of the Bucharest group of surrealists, which also included Gellu Naum, Paul Păun, and Virgil Theodorescu.
