= Gellu Naum =

Romanian poet, dramatist, novelist (1915 – 2001)

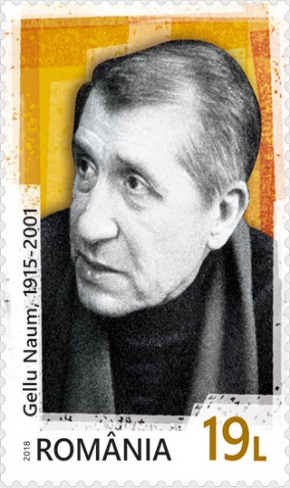
Naum on a 2018 stamp of Romania

Gellu Naum (1 August 1915 – 29 September 2001) was a Romanian poet, dramatist, novelist, children's writer, and translator. He is remembered as the founder of the Romanian Surrealist group. The artist Lyggia Naum, his wife, was the inspiration and main character in his 1985 novel Zenobia.

== Biography ==
Of Aromanian descent, he was born in Bucharest, and was the son of the poet Andrei Naum (who had been drafted in World War I and died during the Battle of Mărășești) and his wife Maria Naum, née Rosa Gluck. In 1933, he began studying philosophy at the University of Bucharest. In 1938, he left for France, where he continued his studies at the University of Paris. He took his PhD diploma with a thesis on the scholastic philosopher Pierre Abelard.

In 1936 (the year when he published his first book), Naum met Victor Brauner, who became his close friend and who later introduced him to André Breton and his Surrealist circle in Paris.

In 1941, he helped create the Bucharest group of Surrealists (which also included Gherasim Luca, Paul Păun, Dolfi Trost, and Virgil Teodorescu). Naum was drafted into Romanian Army during World War II and served on the Eastern Front after the invasion of the Soviet Union (see Romania during World War II). Marked by his wartime experience, he was discharged in 1944, after he had fallen ill.

In December 1947, the Surrealist group succumbed to the vicissitudes of postwar Soviet occupation and successful Communist takeover of Romania's government. As Socialist realism had officially become Romania's cultural policy, he could only publish books for children (out of which the two books with Apolodor were reissued several times). Although he published several books in the line of Socialist realism, which he reneged on afterwards, he never stopped writing Surrealist poems, such as the 1958 poem composed of several parts Heraclitus (published in the 1968 volume Athanor) or the esoteric manuscript The Way of the Snake, written in 1948–1949 and published after his death, in 2002.

Between 1950 and 1953, he taught philosophy at the Agronomic Institute of Bucharest, while working also as a translator. He translated works by Samuel Beckett, René Char, Denis Diderot, Alexandre Dumas, père, Julien Gracq, Victor Hugo, Franz Kafka, Gérard de Nerval, Jacques Prévert, Stendhal, and Jules Verne.

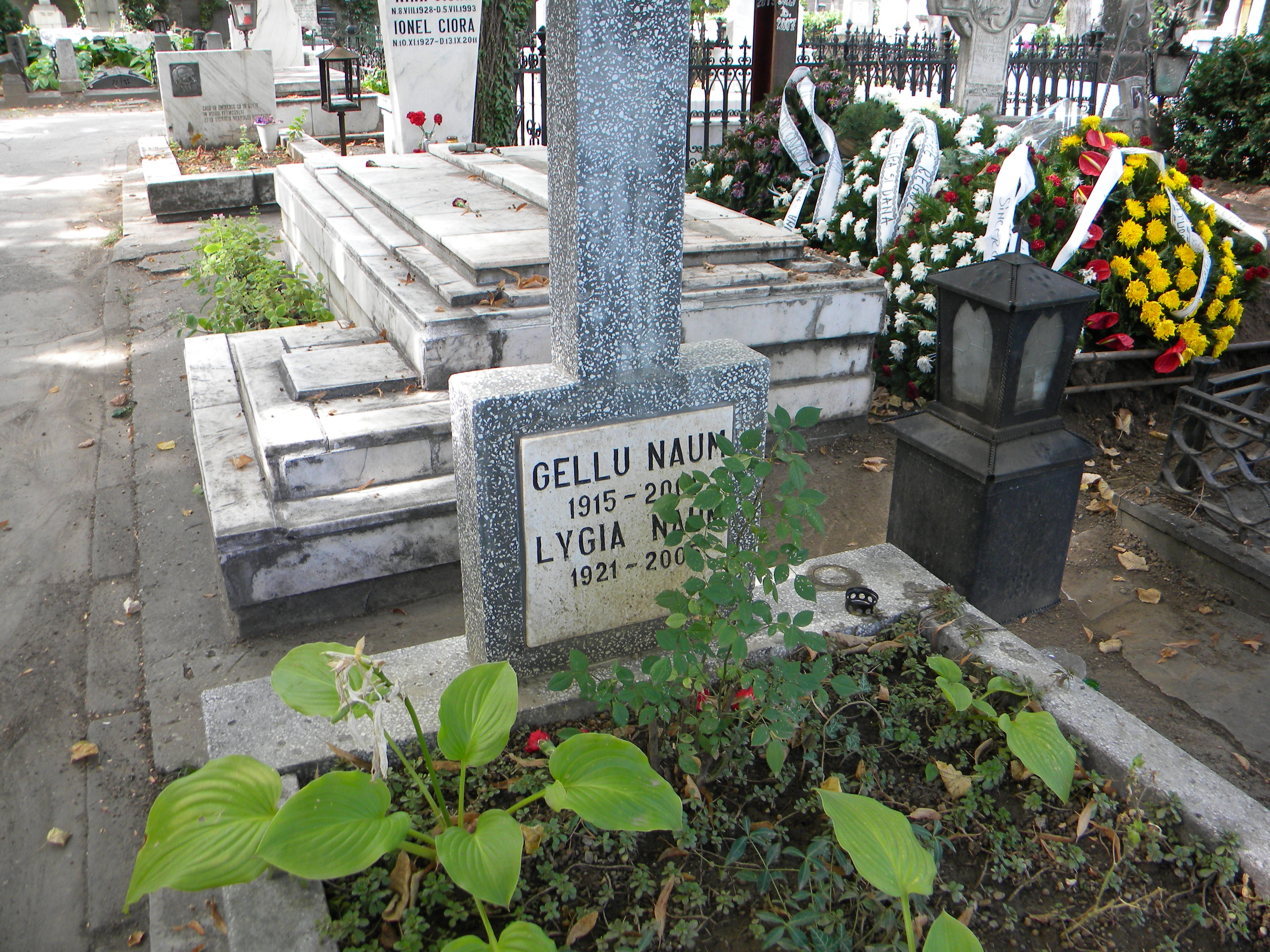
Grave of Gellu Naum and his wife at Bellu Cemetery in Bucharest

He resumed his literary career in 1968, in the wake of a relative cultural liberalization under Nicolae Ceaușescu's regime. In 1971 he was awarded the Order of the Star of the Romanian Socialist Republic, 3rd class.

After the Romanian Revolution of 1989, he traveled abroad and gave public readings in France, Germany, Switzerland, and the Netherlands. In 1995, the German Academic Exchange Service appointed him scholar at the University of Berlin. Naum spent much of his final years at his retreat in Comana. He died at Elias Hospital in Bucharest at age 86; after a memorial service at Amzei Church, he was buried in the city's Bellu Cemetery.

== Works ==
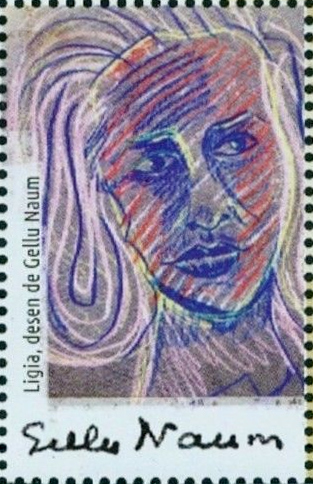
A drawing by Naum on a 2018 stamp of Romania

- Drumețul incendiar ("The Incendiary Traveler"; poems, illustrated by Victor Brauner), Bucharest, 1936
- Vasco de Gama, (poem, illustrated by Jacques Hérold), Bucharest, 1940
- Culoarul somnului, ("The Corridor of Sleep"; poems, illustrated by Victor Brauner), Bucharest, 1944
- Medium (prose), Bucharest, 1945
- Critica mizeriei ("Critique of Misery"; manifesto, co-written with Paul Păun and Virgil Teodorescu)), Bucharest, 1945
- Teribilul interzis ("The Terrible Forbidden"; drama, illustrated by Paul Păun), Bucharest, 1945
- Spectrul longevității: 122 de cadavre ("The Specter of Longevity: 122 corpses"; drama, co-written with Virgil Teodorescu), Bucharest, 1946
- Castelul Orbilor ("Castle of the Blind"; drama), Bucharest, 1946
- L'infra-noir ("Infra-Black"; manifesto, co-written with Gherasim Luca, Paul Păun, Virgil Teodorescu, and Dolfi Trost), Bucharest, 1947
- Éloge de Malombra – Cerne de l'amour absolu ("Malombra's Eulogy – Black Circle of Absolute Love"; manifesto, co-written with Gherasim Luca, Paul Păun, and Dolfi Trost), Bucharest, 1947
- Filonul, Bucharest, 1952 ("The Vein"; prose)
- Tabăra din munți, Bucharest, 1953 ("The Camp in the Mountains"; prose)
- Așa-i Sanda, Bucharest, 1956 ("So Is Sanda"; poems for children)
- Cartea cu Apolodor, Bucharest, 1959 ("The Book With Apolodor"; poems for children, illustrated by Jules Perahim)
- Poem despre tinerețea noastră, Bucharest, 1960 ("Poem About Our Youth"; poems, illustrated by Jules Perahim)
- Soarele calm, Bucharest, 1961 ("The Calm Sun"; poems, illustrated by Jules Perahim)
- A doua carte cu Apolodor, Bucharest, 1964 ("The Second Book With Apolodor"; poems for children, illustrated by Jules Perahim)
- Athanor (poems), Bucharest, 1968
- Poetizați, poetizați... ("Poeticize, Poeticize..."; prose), Bucharest, 1970
- Copacul-animal ("The Animal-Tree"; poems), Bucharest, 1971
- Tatăl meu obosit ("My Tired Father"; poems), Bucharest, 1972
- Poeme alese ("Selected Poems"; poems), Bucharest, 1974
- Cărțile cu Apolodor ("The Apolodor Books", poems for children), Bucharest, 1975
- Descrierea turnului ("Description of the Tower"; poems), Bucharest, 1975
- Insula. Ceasornicăria Taus. Poate Eleonora ("The Island. The Taus Clockmakers. Eleonora, Perhaps"; drama), Bucharest, 1979
- Partea cealaltă ("The Other Side"; poems), Bucharest, 1980
- Zenobia (novel), Bucharest, 1985
- Amedeu, cel mai cumsecade leu, Bucharest, 1988 ("Amedeu, The Most Honest Lion"; poems for children, illustrated by N. Nobilescu)
- Apolodor, un mic pinguin călător, Bucharest, 1988 ("Apolodor, A Small Travelling Penguin"; poems for children, illustrated by N. Nobilescu)
- Malul albastru ("The Blue Shore"; prose), Bucharest, 1990
- Fața și suprafaţa, urmat de Malul albastru ("Face and Surface, followed by The Blue Shore", poems), Bucharest, 1994
- Focul negru ("Black Fire"; poems), Bucharest, 1995
- Sora fântână ("Sister Fountain"; poems), Bucharest, 1995
- Întrebătorul ("The Inquirer"; prose), Bucharest, 1996
- Copacul-animal, urmat de Avantajul vertebrelor ("The Animal-Tree, followed by The Advantage of Vertebrae"), Cluj-Napoca, 2000
- Ascet la baraca de tir ("Recluse in the Firing Range Shack"; poems), Bucharest, 2000
- Calea șearpelui ("The Way of the Snake"), Bucharest, 2002 (posthumous)

== Presence in English language anthologies ==
- Testament – Anthology of Romanian Verse – American Edition - monolingual English edition - Daniel Ioniță (editor and principal translator), with Eva Foster, Daniel Reynaud and Rochelle Bews – Australian-Romanian Academy for Culture – 2017 – ISBN 978-0-9953502-0-5
- Testament - 400 Years of Romanian Poetry - 400 de ani de poezie românească - bilingual edition - Daniel Ioniță (editor and principal translator) with Daniel Reynaud, Adriana Paul & Eva Foster - Editura Minerva, 2019 - ISBN 978-973-21-1070-6
- Romanian Poetry from its Origins to the Present - bilingual edition English/Romanian - Daniel Ioniță (editor and principal translator) with Daniel Reynaud, Adriana Paul and Eva Foster - Australian-Romanian Academy Publishing - 2020 - ISBN 978-0-9953502-8-1 ; OCLC 1288167046
