= Gherasim Luca =

Romanian-born writer

Gherasim Luca (Romanian pronunciation: [geraˈsim ˈluka]; 23 July 1913 – 9 February 1994) was a Romanian surrealist theorist and poet. Born Salman Locker in Romania and also known as Costea Sar, and Petre Malcoci, he chose to become an apatrid, or stateless person, after leaving Romania in 1952.

Much of Luca's work hinged on the deconstruction of language, particularly through the framework of surrealism and its successor movements.

== Early life ==
Born in Bucharest the son of Jewish tailor Berl Locker (died 1914), he spoke Yiddish, Romanian, German, and French.

== Career ==
During 1938, he traveled frequently to Paris where he was introduced to surrealists. World War II and the official antisemitism in Romania forced him into local exile. During the pre-Communist period of Romanian independence, he founded a surrealist artists group with Gellu Naum, Paul Păun, Virgil Teodorescu and Dolfi Trost.

His first publications, including poems in French followed. He was the inventor of cubomania and, in 1945 with Dolfi Trost, authored "Dialectic of Dialectic", a manifesto of the surrealist movement Surautomatism. Harassed in Romania and caught while trying to flee the country, he left Romania in 1952, and moved to Paris after a short stay in Israel.

There he worked among others with Jean Arp, Paul Celan, François Di Dio and Max Ernst, producing numerous collages, drawings, objects, and text-installations. From 1967, his reading sessions took him to Stockholm, Oslo, Geneva, New York City, and San Francisco, although he remained a fairly minor figure in the Parisian scene. The 1988 TV-portrait by Raoul Sanglas, Comment s'en sortir sans sortir, made him famous for a larger readership.

Giles Deleuze first encountered Luca's work in 1972, and continued to follow it until his death. He praised Luca as "the greatest French-speaking poet alive" in his Abécédaire. Deleuze admired Luca's ability to deconstruct the French language and cause it, in his words, to "become minor", and drew his concept of bégaiement de la langue (language stammering or stuttering) from Luca's work.

== Personal life ==
At the end of the 1980s, Luca's residence building in Montmartre was deemed insalubrious by the French authorities. In order to be relocated to another building, he had to justify his citizenship. As he had been without one ever since leaving Romania, he begrudgingly acquired French citizenship by marrying his long time partner. Luca had long refused to acquire citizenship, considering himself a man "belonging to no language, nation, or society".

He died by suicide on 9 February 1994, at the age of 80, by jumping into the Seine.

== Selected works ==
Luca initially wrote most of his poetic works in his native Romanian. Two collections of these, Inventatorul Iubirii and Un lup văzut printr-o lupă, published in Bucharest in 1945, were translated into English (The Inventor of Love and Other Works) by Julian and Laura Semilian and published by Black Widow Press in 2009.

With the authorisation of éditions Corti, a forthcoming chapbook of his poems translated by Fiona Sze-Lorrain will be featured in "Poetry International", Issue no. 15, Spring 2010.

- Un loup à travers une loupe, Bucharest, 1942. Poems in prose, initially published in Romanian. Later translated into French by Gherasim Luca. Apart from Ce Château Pressenti, they remained unpublished in French until 1998, Éditions José Corti
- Quantitativement aimée, Éditions de l'Oubli, Bucharest, 1944
- Le Vampire passif, Éditions de l'Oubli, Bucharest 1945
- Dialectique de la dialectique, together with Dolfi Trost, Éditions surréalistes, Bucharest, 1945
- Les Orgies des Quanta, Éditions de l'Oubli, Bucharest 1946
- Amphitrite, Éditions de l’Infra-noir, Bucharest 1945
- Le Secret du vide et du plein, Éditions de l'Oubli, Bucharest 1947
- Héros-Limite, Le Soleil Noir, Paris 1953 with an engraving and three drawings
- Ce Château Pressenti, Méconnaissance, Paris 1958, with frontispiece and engraving by Victor Brauner. This poem is part of Un loup à travers une loupe
- La Clef, Poème-Tract, 1960, Paris
- L'Extrême-Occidentale, Éditions Mayer, Lausanne 1961 with 7 engravings by Jean Arp, Brauner, Max Ernst, Jacques Hérold, Wifredo Lam, Roberto Matta, Dorothea Tanning
- La Lettre, no editor mentioned, Paris, 1960
- Le Sorcier noir, with Jacques Hérold, Paris 1996
- Sept slogans ontophoniques, Brunidor, Paris 1963 with engravings by Augustin Fernandez, Enrique Zanartu, Gisèle Celan-Lestrange, Jacques Hérold.
- Poésie élémentaire, Éditions Brunidor, Vaduz, Liechtenstein, 1966
- Apostroph'Apocalypse, Éditions Upiglio, Milan 1967 with fourteen engravings by Wifredo Lam
- Sisyphe Géomètre, Éditions Givaudan, Paris, 1967 Book-sculpture designed by Piotr Kowalski
- Droit de regard sur les idées, Brunidor, Paris, 1967
- Déférés devant un tribunal d'exception, no editor mentioned, Paris, 1968.
- Dé-Monologue, Brunidor, Paris, 1969 with two engravings by Micheline Catty
- La Fin du monde, Éditions Petitthory, Paris 1969 with frontispiece by Micheline Catty and five drawings by Ghérasim Luca
- Le Tourbillon qui repose, Critique et Histoire, 1973
- Le Chant de la carpe, Le Soleil Noir, Paris, 1973 with sonogram and sculpture by Kowalski
- Présence de l'imperceptible, Franz Jacob, Châtelet; with no date of publication
- Paralipomènes, Le Soleil Noir, Paris 1976 with a cubomania by Luca
- Théâtre de Bouche, Criapl'e, Paris, 1984 with an engraving and nine drawings by Micheline Catty.
- Satyres et Satrape, Éditions de la Crem, Barlfeur, 1987
- Le Cri, Éditions Au fil de l'encre, Paris, 1995

Others:

- La proie s'ombre
- La voici la voie silanxieuse
- Levée d'écrou, Éditions José Corti, 2003

In English translation:

- The Passive Vampire, Twisted Spoon, 2009. Tr. by Krzysztof Fijalkowski.
- The Inventor of Love & Other Works, Black Widow Press, 2009. Tr. by Laura and Julian Semilian.
- Self-Shadowing Prey, New York: Contra Mundum Press, 2012. Translation and introduction by Mary Ann Caws.
- Something is Still Present and Isn't, of What's Gone. A bilingual anthology of avant-garde and avant-garde inspired Rumanian poetry, Aracne editrice, 2018. Edited and translated by Victor Pambuccian.

In Spanish translation:

- La zozobra de la lengua, El Desvelo Ediciones, Santander, 2018, 368 p. ISBN 978-84-948306-3-1 (translation in Spanish of French and Romanian poems by Catalina Iliescu, Vicente Gutiérrez Escudero, Jesús García Rodríguez y Eugenio Castro; introductory study by Vicente Gutiérrez Escudero).
- Héroe límite, añosluz editora, Buenos Aires, 2022. Tr. by Mariano Fiszman.

== Filmography ==
- Comment s'en sortir sans sortir (1988), directed by Raoul Sangla, in which Gherasim Luca recites eight of his poems in a very sober setting.
