= 1992 in poetry =

Nationality words link to articles with information on the nation's poetry or literature (for instance, Irish or France).

== Events ==
- The Forward Prizes for Poetry in the U.K. are initiated and The Forward Book of Poetry, an associated annual anthology of best British poems, is published for the first time by the Forward Poetry Trust. By 2003, the publication is selling 5,000 to 7,000 copies a year. Each year, 50 to 80 poems are selected.
- The first wall poems in Leiden are installed.

== Works published in English ==
Listed by nation where the work was first published and again by the poet's native land, if different; substantially revised works listed separately:

=== Australia ===
- Chris Mansell, Shining Like a Jinx
- Les Murray, Translations from the Natural World, winner of the 1993 Kenneth Slessor Prize for Poetry
- A. B. Paterson, A. B. Paterson, Selected Poems, edited by Les Murray, Collins/Angus & Robertson, 1992, 1996, posthumous

=== Canada ===
- Elisabeth Harvor, Fortress of Chairs, winner of the Gerald Lampert Award
- Irving Layton, Fornalutx: Selected Poems, 1928-1990. Montreal: McGill-Queen's University Press.
- George Woodcock, George Woodcock's Introduction to Canadian Poetry, Toronto: ECW Press

=== India, in English ===
- Jayanta Mahapatra, A Whiteness of Bone ( Poetry in English ), New Delhi: Penguin Books
- Rukmini Bhaya Nair, The Hyoid Bone ( Poetry in English ), New Delhi: Penguin
- Jeet Thayil and Vijay Nambisan, Gemini-2 ( Poetry in English ), New Delhi: Penguin-Viking
- Arvind Krishna Mehrotra, editor, Oxford India Anthology of Twelve Modern Indian Poets, Arundhathi Subramaniam has called the volume a significant and influential work in Indian poetry
- Ranjit Hoskote and Mangesh Kulkarni, translators, A Terrorist of the Spirit, translation of Vasant Abaji Dahake's Yogabhrashta from the original Marathi into English; New Delhi: Harper Collins/Indus

=== Ireland ===
- Harry Clifton, The Desert Route, Oldcastle: The Gallery Press, ISBN 978-1-85235-092-5
- Seán Dunne, The Sheltered Nest, including "Sydney Place", Oldcastle: The Gallery Press, ISBN 978-1-85235-084-0
- Peter Fallon, Eye to Eye, Oldcastle: The Gallery Press, ISBN 978-1-85235-100-7

=== New Zealand ===
- Fleur Adcock (New Zealand poet who moved to England in 1963), translation of Letters from Darkness: Poems, by Daniela Crasnaru, Oxford: Oxford University Press
- Alistair Campbell, Stone Rain: The Polynesian Strain, Auckland: Hazard Press

=== United Kingdom ===
- Fleur Adcock (New Zealand poet who moved to England in 1963), translation of Letters from Darkness: Poems, by Daniela Crasnaru, Oxford: Oxford University Press
- Simon Armitage:
  - Kid
  - Xanadu
- George Mackay Brown:
  - Brodgar Poems
  - The Lost Village
- Stewart Brown, Caribbean Poetry Now (2nd revised edition), London: Edward Arnold (anthology)
- Wendy Cope, Serious Concerns
- Carol Ann Duffy:
  - William and the Ex-Prime Minister, Anvil Press Poetry, a 16-page pamphlet, ISBN 978-0-85646-253-5
  - Editor, I Wouldn't Thank You for a Valentine, Viking (anthology)
- Douglas Dunn, editor, Faber Book of Twentieth-Century Scottish Poetry, London: Faber and Faber (anthology)
- Gavin Ewart, Like It Or Not
- U. A. Fanthorpe, Neck-Verse
- Thom Gunn:
  - The Man With Night Sweats
  - Old Stories
- Tony Harrison, The Gaze of the Gorgon
- Seamus Heaney:
  - The Golden Bough, Bonnefant Press
  - Sweeney's Flight (with Rachel Giese, photographer), Faber & Faber
- Adrian Henri, The Cerise Swimsuit
- Ted Hughes, Rain-Charm for the Duchy
- Elizabeth Jennings, Times and Seasons
- P. J. Kavanagh, Collected Poems
- James Kirkup, Shooting Stars
- Derek Mahon, The Yaddo Letter, Gallery Press
- George MacBeth, The Patient
- Roger McGough, Defying Gravity
- David Owen, editor, Seven Ages: poetry for a lifetime, anthology
- Peter Porter, The Chair of Babel
- Kathleen Raine, Living With Mystery
- Peter Reading:
  - Evagatory
  - 3 in 1
- Peter Redgrove, Under the Reservoir
- Jeremy Reed, Black Sugar, illustrated by Jean Cocteau
- William Scammell, Bleeding Heart Yard
- Jo Shapcott, Phrase Book
- Penelope Shuttle, Taxing the Rain
- Jon Silkin, The Lens-Breakers
- David Storey, Storey's Lives: 1951-1991
- R.S. Thomas, Mass for Hard Times
- Charles Tomlinson, The Door in the Wall
- Benjamin Zephaniah, City Psalms

=== United States ===
- Sherman Alexie, The Business of Fancy Dancing
- John Ashbery, Hotel Lautréamont
- Renée Ashley, Salt
- Jack Gilbert, The Great Fires
- Anthony Kellman, editor, Crossing Water: Contemporary Poetry of the English-Speaking Caribbean, Greenfield Center, New York: Greenfield Review Press (anthology)
- Zoe Leonard, I want a president
- N. Scott Momaday, In the Presence of the Sun, combination of poetry and nonfiction
- Mary Oliver, New and Selected Poems
- Simon Ortiz, Woven Stone, combination of poetry and nonfiction
- Grace Paley, New and Collected Poems
- Carl Phillips, In the Blood
- Gjertrud Schnackenberg, A Gilded Lapse of Time
- Lloyd Schwartz, Goodnight, Gracie
- Patti Smith, Woolgathering
- James Wright, Above the River: Complete Poems, introduction by Donald Hall (posthumous)
- Michael Jackson, Dancing the Dream

==== Poets included in The Best American Poetry 1992 ====
These 75 poets are included in The Best American Poetry 1992 edited by David Lehman, with guest editor Charles Simic:

- Jonathan Aaron
- Agha Shahid Ali
- John Ash
- John Ashbery
- Robin Behn
- Charles Bernstein
- George Bilgere
- Elizabeth Bishop
- Robert Bly
- Lucie Brock-Broido
- Joseph Brodsky
- Hayden Carruth
- Billy Collins
- Robert Creeley
- Kathleen de Azevedo
- Carl Dennis
- Deborah Digges
- Stephen Dunn
- Susan Firer
- Alice Fulton
- Tess Gallagher
- Amy Gerstler
- Jack Gilbert
- Louise Glück
- Jill Gonet
- Jorie Graham
- Allen Grossman
- Marilyn Hacker
- Donald Hall
- Daniel Halpern
- Robert Hass
- Vickie Hearne
- Juan Felipe Herrera
- Edward Hirsch
- Daniel Hoffman
- John Hollander
- Richard Howard
- Lynda Hull
- Lawrence Joseph
- Galway Kinnell
- Carolyn Kizer
- Phyllis Koestenbaum
- Sharon Krinsky
- Maxine Kumin
- Evelyn Lao
- Li-Young Lee
- Dionisio D. Martínez
- Mekeel McBride
- James McCorkle
- Jerry McGuire
- Sandra McPherson
- Robert Morgan
- Thylias Moss
- Carol Muske
- Mary Oliver
- Michael Palmer
- Robert Pinsky
- Lawrence Raab
- Liam Rector
- Donald Revell
- Adrienne Rich
- Len Roberts
- Lynda Schraufnagel
- Elizabeth Spires
- Rachel Srubas
- David St. John
- Richard Tillinghast
- Lewis Turco
- Chase Twichell
- Rosanna Warren
- Ioanna-Veronika Warwick
- C. K. Williams
- Charles Wright
- Franz Wright
- Stephen Yenser

=== Other ===
- Nuala Ní Dhomhnaill, The Astrakhan Cloak, including "Caitlin", Oldcastle: The Gallery Press

== Works published in other languages ==
Listed by nation where the work was first published and again by the poet's native land, if different; substantially revised works listed separately:

=== Danish ===
- Naja Marie Aidt, Et Vanskeligt mode ("A Difficult Encounter"), second volume of a poetic trilogy which started with Sålænge jeg er ung ("As Long as I’m Young") 1991, and ended with Det tredje landskap ("The Third Landscape") 1994

=== French language ===
==== Canada, in French ====
- Denise Desautels, Le saut de l'ange, autour de quelques objets de Martha Townsend, Montréal/Amay, Le Noroît /L'Arbre à paroles
- Jean Royer, Le lien de la terre, Trois-Rivières: Écrits des Forges / Paris: Europe poésie

==== France ====
- Olivier Barbarant, Les parquets du ciel, publisher: Editions Champ Vallon, ISBN 978-2-87673-140-0
- Michel Houellebecq, La Poursuite du bonheur, poèmes, La Différence
- Abdellatif Laabi, Moroccan author writing in French and published in France:
  - Le soleil se meurt; Paris: La Différence
  - translator, La Joie n'est pas mon métier, translated from the original Arabic of Mohammed Al-Maghout; Paris: Éditions de la Différence, coll. Orphée

=== Hungary ===
- György Petri, Sár
- Sándor Tóth, Belül ragyoghatsz

=== India ===
Listed in alphabetical order by first name:

- Chandrakant Shah, also known as Chandu Shah, Ane Thoda Sapna ("And Some Dreams"), received the award for "Best Collection of New Gujarati Poems" published in 1992-1993 by the Gujarati Sahitya Parishad; Mumbai: SNDT University; Gujarati-language
- Dilip Chitre, Ekoon Kavita – 1, Mumbai: Popular Prakashan; Marathi-language
- K. Satchidanandan, Kavibuddhan, ("The Poet as Buddha"); Malayalam-language
- Mamta Sagar, Kaada Navilina Hejje, Heggodu: Akshara Prakashana, Kannada-language
- Vinod Kumar Shukla, Sab Kuch Hona Bacha Rahega, New Delhi: Rajkamal Prakashan; Hindi-language

=== Poland ===
- Stanisław Barańczak, Ocalone w tlumaczeniu. Szkice o warsztacie tlumaczenia poezji ("Saved in Translation: Sketches on the Craft of Translating Poetry"), criticism; Poznan: a5
- Zbigniew Herbert, Rovigo, Wrocław: Wydawnictwo Dolnośląskie
- Eugeniusz Tkaczyszyn-Dycki, Peregrynarz
- Tadeusz Różewicz, Nasz starszy brat ("Our Elder Brother")
- Wisława Szymborska: Lektury nadobowiązkowe ("Non-required Reading")
- Adam Zagajewski, Dzikie czeresnie, wybór wierszy ("Wild Cherries, a Selection of Poetry"), Kraków: Znak

=== Other languages ===
- Han Dong, Baise de shitou ("The White Stone"), Shanghai: wenyi chubanshe China
- Gabriela Mistral, Lagar II, published posthumously, Santiago, Chile: Biblioteca Nacional
- Maria Luisa Spaziani, Torri di vedata, Italy

== Awards and honors ==
- Nobel prize: Derek Walcott

=== Australia ===
- C. J. Dennis Prize for Poetry: Robert Harris, Jane, Interlinear and Other Poems
- Kenneth Slessor Prize for Poetry: Elizabeth Riddell, Selected Poems
- Mary Gilmore Prize: Alison Croggon - This is the Stone

=== Canada ===
- Gerald Lampert Award: Joanne Arnott, Wiles of Girlhood
- Archibald Lampman Award: Blaine Marchand, A Garden Enclosed
- 1992 Governor General's Awards: Lorna Crozier, Inventing the Hawk (English); Gilles Cyr, Andromède attendra
- Pat Lowther Award: Kate Braid, Covering Rough Ground
- Prix Alain-Grandbois: Monique Bosco, Miserere
- Dorothy Livesay Poetry Prize: Barry McKinnon, Pulplog
- Prix Émile-Nelligan: Serge Patrice Thibodeau, Le Cycle de Prague

=== United Kingdom ===
- Cholmondeley Award: Allen Curnow, Donald Davie, Carol Ann Duffy, Roger Woddis
- Eric Gregory Award: Jill Dawson, Hugh Dunkerley, Christopher Greenhalgh, Marita Maddah, Stuart Paterson, Stuart Pickford
- Forward Poetry Prize Best Collection: Thom Gunn, The Man with Night Sweats (Faber and Faber)
- Forward Poetry Prize Best First Collection: Simon Armitage, Kid (Faber and Faber)
- Queen's Gold Medal for Poetry: Kathleen Raine
- Whitbread Award for poetry: Tony Harrison, The Gaze of the Gorgon

=== United States ===
- Agnes Lynch Starrett Poetry Prize: Hunt Hawkins, The Domestic Life
- Aiken Taylor Award for Modern American Poetry: Gwendolyn Brooks
- AML Award for poetry to Kathy Evans for "Wednesday Morning"; "Midweek"; "Eight Windows"; "Vows"; "Love to the Second Power"
- Bernard F. Connors Prize for Poetry: Tony Sanders, "The Warning Track"
- Bobbitt National Prize for Poetry: Louise Glück for Ararat, and Mark Strand for The Continuous Life
- Frost Medal: Adrienne Rich / David Ignatow
- National Book Award for poetry: Mary Oliver, New & Selected Poems
- Poet Laureate Consultant in Poetry to the Library of Congress: Mona Van Duyn
- Pulitzer Prize for Poetry: James Tate, Selected Poems
- Rhysling Award:
  - W. Gregory Stewart, the button, and what you know (Long Form)
  - David Lunde, Song of the Martian Cricket, (Short Form)
- Ruth Lilly Poetry Prize: John Ashbery
- Whiting Awards: Roger Fanning, Jane Mead, Katha Pollitt
- William Carlos Williams Award: Louise Glück, The Wild Iris
- Fellowship of the Academy of American Poets: Adrienne Rich

== Births ==
- October 5 – Rupi Kaur, Indian-born Canadian poet and illustrator

== Deaths ==
Birth years link to the corresponding "[year] in poetry" article:

- January 14 – Irakli Abashidze, 82 (born 1909), Georgian poet, literary scholar and politician
- February 16
  - Angela Carter, 51 (born 1940), English novelist and poet, of lung cancer
  - George MacBeth, 60 (born 1932), Scottish-born poet, novelist and critic, of motor neuron disease
- February 18 – Robert Gittings, 81 (born 1911), English poet and biographer
- February 29 – Ruth Pitter, 94 (born 1897), English poet and decorative painter
- April 11 – Eve Merriam, née Moskowitz, 75 (born 1916), American poet, playwright and teacher, of cancer
- May 12 – Nikos Gatsos, 80 (born 1911), Greek poet, translator and lyricist
- May 21 – Bimbo Rivas, 52 (born 1939), Puerto Rican-born American actor, community activist, director, playwright, poet and teacher, of heart attack
- November 17 – Audre Lorde (aka Gamba Adisa), 58 (born 1934), African American writer, poet and political activist, of liver cancer
- November 19 – Kenneth Burke, 96 (born 1897), American literary theorist and philosopher

== See also ==
- Poetry
- List of years in poetry
- List of poetry awards
