= Ștefan Baciu =

Romanian and Brazilian writer (1918–1993)

Ștefan Aurel Baciu Esteban Baciu Estêvão Baciu
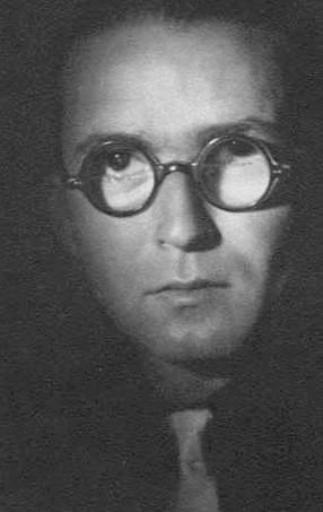
- Baciu ca. 1940
- Born: October 29, 1918; Brassó, Austria-Hungary
- Died: January 6, 1993 (aged 74); Honolulu, Hawaii, United States
- Occupations: poet, journalist, diplomat, civil servant
- Writing career
- Pen name: Grigore Cumpănașu
- Period: 1930–1993
- Genres: lyric poetry, autofiction, biography, memoir, essay, reportage, pastiche, parody
- Literary movement: Surrealism, Impressionism, Expressionism, Gândirea

Signature
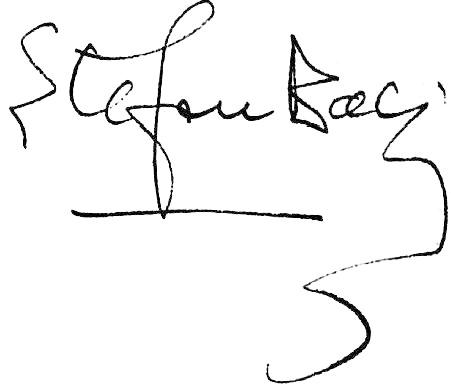

Ștefan Aurel Baciu (Portuguese: Estêvão Baciu, Spanish: Esteban Baciu; October 29, 1918 – January 6, 1993) was a Romanian and Brazilian poet, novelist, publicist and academic who lived his later life in Hawaii. A precocious, award-winning, young author in interwar Romania, he was involved in editing several literary magazines. Attracted into left-wing democratic politics and the Social Democratic Party (PSDR), he camouflaged his views while working for the fascist press under dictatorial regimes, but returned in 1944 to manage the PSDR's Libertatea newspaper. Witnessing first-hand the gradual communist takeover, Baciu managed to have himself assigned to a diplomatic posting in Switzerland, and ultimately defected in 1948. A resident and then citizen of Brazil, and a traveler throughout Latin America, he wrote works in Portuguese, Spanish, English and German, as well as in his native Romanian.

Involved with the Congress for Cultural Freedom and a friend of independent socialists such as Juan Bosch, Baciu spoke out against South American communism and criticized Fidel Castro. He eventually moved to the United States, as a professor at the University of Washington, and, from 1964, the University of Hawaii. He put out the international magazine Mele, which, although rudimentarily printed and little circulated, remains a noted source of information about avant-garde writers of the Romanian diaspora, from Andrei Codrescu to Dolfi Trost and Sesto Pals. Baciu was also a preeminent historian and anthologist of South and Central American surrealism, as well as a translator of Latin American literature into Romanian and German.

== Biography ==
=== Early life ===
Ștefan Baciu was born in Brașov, some months before the city became part of Greater Romania. His was a multicultural intellectual family. His father was the ethnic Romanian Ioan Baciu, a product of Austro-Hungarian schooling, was at the time a teacher of German at the Șaguna National College. He is remembered as the co-author of a pioneering introductory Romanian textbook for the benefit of Saxons and Hungarians. In 1930, he built for his family the "Yellow House" in Lunca Plăieșului residential property, which had recently been opened for settlement. The poet's mother, Elisabeta, was the daughter of the forestry engineer Arthur Sager; his maternal aunt, Lenuța König, was a corsetmaker for Queen Marie. Baciu's sister, Ioana Veronica, had a successful career in the theater. Through the Sagers, Ștefan and Ioana were of Jewish descent. Raised Romanian Orthodox, and still a practicing believer in the 1960s, Baciu considered himself a "cosmopolitan" one.

Baciu was a precocious child. Bookish from an early age, despite being heavily myopic, he discovered Romanian and German poetic anthologies, including Kurt Pinthus' expressionistic chrestomathy, Menscheitsdämerung. In addition to German, he taught himself French, English, Spanish and Portuguese. A student of his father's Șaguna National College, where he earned top grades, he made friends with two of his teachers, writers Octav Șuluțiu and Emil Cioran. Șuluțiu would later refer to Baciu as one of the most characteristic poets of Transylvania region.

Baciu made his editorial debut as a teenager, with German- and Romanian-language poems published in the local reviews Klingsor and Răboj. In September 1933, having been denied sponsorship of a literary magazine by Șaguna College, he set up his own, avant-garde sheet called Start. It was indebted to surrealist automatism and by André Gide's rebellious philosophy. Start functioned as a local satellite of I. Valerian's Viața Literară, which had appointed Baciu its official correspondent and publicity agent for the whole of Transylvania. Struggling with financial difficulties, Start did not survive beyond its second issue. Baciu moved on to publish other magazines, alongside Vintilă Horia, Mihai Beniuc, and Ovid Caledoniu: Stilet ("Stiletto"), then Meșterul Manole (named after the folk legend hero). Additionally, he was a contributor to literary magazines and newspapers across Romania, including Gând Românesc, Glasul Bucovinei, Rampa, and George Ivașcu's Manifest.

At age seventeen, Baciu had his Poemele poetului tânăr ("Poems of the Young Poet") picked up in a "young poets' anthology", and put out by the official publishing company, Editura Fundațiilor Regale. He was presented with the company's own Young Writers Award and received the Romanian Writers' Society Poetry Prize. He followed up in 1936 with Poeme de dragoste ("Love Poems"), published by Familia of Oradea, and in 1937 with Micul dor ("A Tiny Longing"). Also that year, he was included in the anthology 13 poeți, with Horia, Caledoniu, Constantin Virgil Gheorghiu, Simion Stolnicu, Dumitru Gherghinescu-Vania and various others.

=== Under fascism ===
Young Baciu was soon received into the cultural elite of Bucharest, befriending the likes of Păstorel Teodoreanu and Ion Minulescu. Alongside Caledoniu, George Petcu, Maria Banuș, Laurențiu Fulga and some others, Baciu was also drawn into the "White Nights Manifesto" circle, which sought to promote young literature. Also faced with financial troubles, and unsuccessful in its bid to receive state funding, the circle closed shop in 1938.

Baciu had since enlisted at the University of Bucharest Faculty of Law, whence he graduated in 1941. His college years overlapped with the demise of Romanian democracy and several authoritarian experiments, the first of which was a National Renaissance Front dictatorship. By late 1938, Baciu had begun collaborating in the semi-official newspaper, Sfarmă-Piatră, published by the fascist sympathizer Nichifor Crainic. He had a literary history column, Cronici germane ("German Chronicles"), with which he aimed to popularize "that superb German Romanticism". He was in correspondence with a more senior poet, Emil Giurgiuca, offering to popularize Giurgiuca's work "in Sfarmă-Piatră or wherever". Also in 1938, Baciu collected his translations from Georg Trakl, which came out at Editura Frize in Iași.

Having openly supported the Iron Guard as a radical fascist alternative to the establishment, Sfarmă-Piatră was also falling into disfavor with the National Renaissance Front regime. Early in 1939, following bloody clashes between the Front and the Guardists, Sfarmă-Piatră was outlawed. Baciu moved to the more mainstream Universul, becoming its editor and resuming Cronici germane in its literary supplement. He also held the literary criticism column, taking over from Ștefan Augustin Doinaș.

During the early stages of World War II, Crainic gave Baciu the office of editorial secretary at Gândirea magazine, but sacked him upon finding out about his Social Democratic loyalties. According to communist sources, Baciu was himself an affiliate or sympathizer of the Iron Guard—a claim that has since been disputed; Baciu's PSDR membership and his mother's Jewishness disqualified him for such an enterprise. By his own account, Baciu was a malagambist, meaning that he followed the zoot-clad jazzman Sergiu Malagamba and had cosmopolitan, Americophile tastes. He did however befried the Guard's poet laureate, Radu Gyr, helping him publish in Gândirea even after the Guard's violent fall from grace in early 1941.

Upon his graduation, Baciu became translator for the Institute of Statistics (under Sabin Manuilă), cultural adviser for the General Council of Bucharest, and publisher for the companies Gorjanul and Publicom. His poetic work was collected in the volumes Drumeț în anotimpuri ("A Traveler through Seasons", 1939), Căutătorul de comori ("The Treasure Hunter", 1939), Cetatea lui Bucur ("Bucur's Citadel", 1940), and Muzica sferelor ("Music of the Spheres", 1943). Attracted by the prospects of a good pay in the only thriving literary industry of the war years, he began contributing to the humorous press. He debuted in Virgil Slăvescu's Păcală, as "Grigore Cumpănașu", and later held columns in Veselia and Ion Anestin's Gluma.

While at university, Baciu had met and fallen in love with Mira Simian (born 1920). The daughter of Dinu Simian, a National Peasants' Party politician from Vâlcea County, heir to a tanning and footwear-making empire, and his Polish wife, Mira attended the Bucharest Faculty of Letters, then worked as a pharmacist in Râmnicu Vâlcea. She married Baciu upon the war's end.

=== PSDR journalist, diplomat, defector ===
The August 23, 1944 Coup unsealed Romania's alliance with Nazi Germany, and brought back democracy, but also signified the onset of Soviet occupation. Shortly after the legalization of political parties, Baciu became editor of the Social Democratic press organ Libertatea ("Liberty"). From October 1944 to December 1945, he edited his own illustrated satirical review, Humorul ("Humor"). Meanwhile, he also put out new selections from his poetry: Cântecul mulțimii ("Song of the Crowd"), with a preface by Ion Pas, came out at the PSDR party press in 1944; Caiet de vacanță ("Notebook for the Holidays") at Unirea of Râmnicu Vâlcea in 1945. His circle of acquaintances grew to include some members of the Bucharest surrealist circle, in particular Sesto Pals (who was Baciu's lifelong friend) and Dolfi Trost.

With his party falling under the influence of Romanian Communists, Baciu remained close to the independent pro-Western wing, under Constantin Titel Petrescu. As he would note in 1992, Baciu had always been "an adept of democratic socialism". He referred to Petrescu as "the tocsin-sounder of the great perils that were knocking on our door, perils not just for the existence of social democracy, but also of Romania's very existence as a free democratic state".

Baciu described with alarm the rapid communization of his writer friends, recording Beniuc's enthusiasm at seeing liberal demonstrators being repressed with machine guns. He also witnessed the desperation of his friend Gyr, who attempted suicide in Râmnicu Vâlcea. However, according to literary historian Mircea Popa, Baciu's Libertatea editorials were of that kind "that would later shame him": young Baciu ridiculed the prewar regime as an era of conformity and "nothingness", and even praised socialist realism. At the time, Communist Party politicians tempted him with offers to become Prefect or theater manager. Baciu was present at the PSDR Congress of March 10, 1946, which resulted in the party's electoral alliance with the Communists. His testimony describes Petrescu's anti-fusion speech as the point of view of a "good and courageous Romanian". Baciu further recalls: "I walked [Petrescu] back to his home alongside some hundreds of partisans".

In October 1946, owing to his Social Democratic credentials, Baciu was appointed press officer of the Romanian Embassy in Bern. The ambassador was Șerban Voinea, a PSDR theoretician. Baciu conceived of this assignment as a safe haven from communism, but was still troubled about leaving Romania and his relatives. He brought up the issue in conversations with Petrescu, who advised him: "Forget [Mira's] pharmacy, choose freedom." His appointment became the object of disputes between Communist-controlled agencies and Foreign Affairs, which was still controlled by an ally, Gheorghe Tătărescu. As Baciu recalls, Tătărescu gave him and his wife tacit backing, without signing any papers, and discreetly handed them their diplomatic passports.

On November 5, the Bacius crossed into Hungary semi-clandestinely, knowing that they risked being returned at the border. The Petru Groza government was only informed later of their arrival in Bern. Like Voinea, Baciu had open disagreements with his Bucharest superiors, complaining that his efforts to publicize Romanian literature in the Swiss "workers' press" were not being supported by the Romanian state. He wrote for the editorial section of Tribune de Genève, to dissuade Swiss fears about the stabilization of the Romanian leu. The communist authorities later accused him of purposefully withholding information, "thus giving reactionaries reason to minimize this important reform". In late 1947, just before the proclamation of a Romanian communist republic, Voinea resigned his posting. Baciu, who was recalled and assigned to a new post in Sofia, opted to discontinue his work in diplomacy and demand political asylum in Switzerland. He was advised to do so by a friend, Victor Popescu (son of Universul editor Stelian Popescu).

=== Brazilian exile ===
The Bacius registered their case with the International Refugee Organization (IRO), who processed them to determine if they were or had been undercover agents of a secret service. During the interval, Baciu was publishing essays and in Literarische Tat, and Mira was working for the Zytglogge pharmacy. The Bacius simultaneously applied for asylum in Brazil, Peru and Venezuela (meanwhile, Mira's uncles had managed to escape to Argentina).

Cleared by the IRO in early 1949, the Bacius were given asylum rights in Brazil, and arrived at Rio de Janeiro in March. They had a rough start in the new country, and struggled to make ends meet. Ștefan Baciu resumed his work in poetry, translating Latin American novellas into German and Raúl Otero Reiche's América into Romanian, and publishing his own surrealist works, including Analiza cuvântului dor (Valle Hermoso, 1951). In late 1952, alongside Faust Brădescu, he was editing Înșir-te Mărgărite, a magazine for the Romanian Brazilian community, which also reached Romanian communities from Argentina to Francoist Spain. Its stated purpose was the preservation and publicizing of Romanian poetry and prose. Romania's Securitate secret police, which was following his movements, noted Brădescu's Iron Guard affiliation as a sign of Baciu's own fascism.

Also in 1953, Baciu was made editor of the foreign politics page at Carlos Lacerda's Tribuna da Imprensa. According to the Securitate, this was a "newspaper of the fascist kind". He published occasional contributions to Revista da Semana, Diário Carioca, and Maquis, and, in 1957, two volumes of his Portuguese-language poetry: Aula de solidão ("Lesson in Solitude"), Dois Guatemaltecos ("Two Guatemalans"). Meanwhile, Mira Baciu worked as a translator for the Deputies' Chamber.

With Tribuna da Imprensa credentials, Baciu traveled across Latin America. In Mexico, he interviewed Natalia Sedova, widow of Leon Trotsky. In 1956, he was at Lima, where he met the Romanian writer-violinist Grigore Cugler. The two began a correspondence, with Baciu persuading Cugler to republish his 1930s avant-garde stories. He prepared for publishing Cugler's Afară de unul singur, but the manuscript was lost in the process (although an earlier print was eventually recovered in 1998). Baciu also embarked on a mission to popularize Romanian avant-garde writers, publishing Spanish and Portuguese essays about Urmuz and Constant Tonegaru.

By then, Baciu was also involved with the anti-authoritarian left-wing movement on the South American continent. As he saw it, the caudillo regimes of Alfredo Stroessner, Juan Perón or Anastasio Somoza were generally equivalent to Eastern European Stalinism. Together with Salvadorean diplomat Rafael Barraza Monterrosa, the Bacius managed a Panhispanist association, called Ruy Barbosa Circle, building personal contacts with Juan Bosch, the exiled Dominican socialist, and Carlos Mérida, the Guatemalan painter. In 1956, he had an encounter with Cuban revolutionary Fidel Castro, and became a sympathizer of his 26th of July Movement.

=== CCF and Cuban Revolution ===
The Bacius were eventually granted Brazilian citizenship, and became fully integrated in Brazil's cultural life. The couple counted among their writer friends Carlos Drummond de Andrade, Manuel Bandeira and Cecília Meireles. In April 1958, Baciu, Meireles and Bandeira were among the 42 intellectuals who set up a Brazilian chapter of the anticommunist Congress for Cultural Freedom (CCF), which, from 1959, put out the Portuguese-language review Cadernos Brasileiros. The organization was in part funded by the Central Intelligence Agency, through its Paris agent, John Hunt (with whom Baciu corresponded), and answered directly to the Spaniard Julián Gorkin. Baciu joined the staff of Cadernos as editor in chief (with Afrânio Coutinho as editorial manager) and was General Secretary of the CCF until August 1962; Mira was the Executive Secretary.

Baciu was with Bosch in Venezuela, celebrating Rómulo Betancourt's victory in the election of December 1958. Together with Bosch, he organized a negative campaign against the Republic of Cuba, but Bosch refused any explicit endorsement of Castro's guerrilla. In January 1959, following the success of the Cuban Revolution, Baciu was invited by the new government in Havana, to report on the work of the revolutionary tribunals. He declined the invitation but, later that year, he made his way there to interview Castro. He recorded in particular Castro's disdain for the Cuban Communists. In March, he happened to meet Castro's communist inspiration, Che Guevara, but they only discussed literature.

Also in 1959, Baciu published in Rio the essay Um continente em busca de uma doutrina ("A Continent Searching for a Doctrine"). In 1960, he was awarded honorary citizenship of Rio. He was working on the book of memoirs in Portuguese, Bucareste-Estação Norte ("Bucharest-Northern Station"), which came out at Edições o Cruzeiro in 1961. Meanwhile, Baciu's Romanian relatives were suffering under communist persecution. Dinu Simian was mistreated and tortured in Sighet prison, where he eventually died; Dinu's wife, Constanța, was also detained, and, upon her 1962 release, had to struggle to make ends meet. In 1962, through the intercession of Brazilian President Juscelino Kubitschek, Mira Baciu persuaded the Romanian authorities to grant her mother safe passage to Brazil.

With his 1961 reportage Cortina de hierro sobre Cuba ("The Iron Curtain over Cuba"), prefaced by Salvador de Madariaga, Baciu made public his criticism of Castroist communism, and condemned its spread to other Latin American nations. He rendered it even more explicit in the poem Eu nu îl cînt pe Che ("I Do Not Sing for Che"), known in Spanish as Yo no canto al Ché. This change of attitudes was radical, as Baciu moved to confront the communists directly, and, in his letters to Gorkin, stated his desire to purge the CCF itself of "camouflaged" Brazilian Communists. Such ideas alarmed the CIA, since they risked alienating the anticommunist left. John Hunt and Keith Botsford repeatedly asked Baciu to focus on anti-Casto, rather than "right-wing", propaganda (Hunt referred to Baciu as "a right-wing democratic socialist", a Betancourt associate, and a "maniac"). By then, the Brazilian CCF was vulnerable, its CIA connections brought up for public debate by communist intellectuals like Jorge Amado and Egídio Squeff. Although he did not formally adhere to any Romanian anticommunist organization, Baciu was in correspondence with Constantin Vișoianu and the Romanian National Committee, publishing anticommunist essays in the latter's România gazette.

Allegedly, Baciu found himself threatened by the Cuban Intelligence Directorate. However, it was Baciu's extreme anticommunism that prompted Hunt to demand his resignation and appoint Vicente de Paulo Barretto as the new CCF General Secretary. Baciu later commented that the CCF had committed "suicide" by moderating its tone, noting that its "constructive dialogue with proven communists" was a moral victory for "Eurocommunism".

=== Between Seattle and Honolulu ===
Baciu's Rio colleagues backed him in his bid for the Brazilian literature chair at the University of Washington. He obtained it, and moved to Seattle, where Mira began her own career as a Spanish-language teacher. However, Mira detested the Oceanic climate, and the couple was often taking trips back to Latin America. In 1963, Baciu and his wife were in Santo Domingo, celebrating Bosch's victory in the Dominican presidential suffrage. Afterwards, they also visited neighboring Haiti, where Baciu was trying to recover for publishing the obscure surrealist works of Clément Magloire-Saint-Aude. The same year, Baciu published in Mexico City his poetic cycle Poemele poetului pribeag ("Poems of the Outcast Poet").

In 1964, Baciu obtained a professorship in Latin American literature at the newly founded University of Hawaii. He enjoyed his work there, but felt bad about the smaller attendance his classes inevitably received. In 1965, the Bacius set up their own magazine, International Poetry Letter – Mele (from the Hawaiian for "song"), which sought to establish connections between Latino, French, American and Romanian literature. Although noted for the quality of its illustrations, Mele had a very minor circulation, with at most 300 copies per issue, all of them xerographed by Baciu's students.

Mele sought to popularize Romanian authors, and, doubling as a publishing house, put out periodic selections from Baciu's own poems in Romanian and Spanish. Baciu helped discover and popularize Andrei Codrescu, the neo-avant-garde Romanian exile writer. In 1967, the Bacius' home in Honolulu hosted Valeriu Anania, the writer and abbot of the Romanian Orthodox Church in America. A former Iron Guard man and prisoner of the communists, released with the spell of liberalization in 1964, Anania was treating his depression in Hawaii. He was putting to paper a novel and poetry that he had "written inside his brain" while in jail, and doing research into Hawaiian folklore. Anania later recalled that Mira Baciu had fallen in love with him, and that he had to fend off her advances while remaining friends with her and her husband.

Baciu returned to Romanian-language publishing with the 1967 Ukulele, put out by George Uscătescu's Editura Destin in Spain. He also made a comeback to Portuguese letters with the 1966 essay Manuel Bandeira de corpo inteiro ("The Complete Manuel Bandeira"). He followed up with a 1967 essay on the politics of Juan Bosch and Spanish-language poetry volumes, Semblanza y explicación de Latinoamérica ("A Profile and Explanation of Latin America") of 1968 and the 1973 Nasserismo ("Nasserism"). In 1972, he published in Madrid's Colecția Start a complete collection of his Romanian poems. They featured a preface by Lucian Boz and a portrait by Marcel Janco. Baciu also translated Romanian poetry into Spanish, and published several anthologies, beginning with the 1969 Poetas rumanos. He was under contract with publishing houses in West Germany, such as Peter Hammer and Neues Leben, translating for them five volumes of poetry by Ernesto Cardenal.

=== Anthologist ===
Inspired by an encounter with French surrealist Benjamin Péret, Baciu had begun a vast work of research into the history of Latin American avant-garde literature, and spent some time in Peru and Bolivia. By his own account, he interviewed "my great friend" Tristán Marof, Luis Alberto Sánchez, Javier Sologuren and Emilio Adolfo Westphalen, and helped rediscover the anticommunist surrealist Rafael Méndez Dorich. As noted by Sologuren, Baciu's studies also helped revive interest in the poetry of César Moro. In Argentina, Baciu befriended Aldo Pellegrini, who let him discover early avant-garde texts by Jorge Luis Borges and "the extraordinary" Antonio Porchia. Pellegrini also introduced him to Enrique Gómez Correa and the Chilean surrealist scene. Introduced to Jean Charlot by Mérida, Baciu researched the history of Mexican muralism, and discovered the proto-surrealism of José Guadalupe Posada.

He was still following with interest the work of writers in Romania, and published his translations of neomodernist Romanian literature in a special issue of Peru's Haraui review. Baciu also followed the work of Romanians who translated Latino literature into Romanian. He found these attempts inauthentic and superficial, and criticized them in the 1970 essay Brazilia masacrata. To the irritation of Editura Dacia publishers, he mailed them copies of this critique. Baciu later exposed communist censorship, noting for instance the cuts that had been made into the published diaries of Șuluțiu, and the exclusion of concrete poetry from the Brazilian anthologies of Darie Novăceanu. As he put it, "I believe it a duty of the exile writer to defend the Romanian language from the 'party-minded' invasion of the mediocrities, the boot-lickers, the savvy ones and the profiteers, be they talented or talentless."

Baciu's inclusion in a poetry anthology, put out in Bucharest by Nicolae Manolescu, scandalized the communist apparatus; the work was soon withdrawn from bookstores by the censors. Nevertheless, the new communist regime of Nicolae Ceaușescu made some efforts to appease Baciu and enlist him to write "propaganda for Romanian art and culture during the years of socialist consolidation", and even allowed Romanian journalists to contact him on the phone. Baciu claimed to have cut short such attempts, identifying them as a Securitate diversion. His rejection did not prevent Iron Guard loyalists such as Horia Stamatu from labeling Baciu a spy and avoiding all contact with him.

In 1974, Baciu ultimately put out at SUNY Press an overall anthology of Latin American poetry (Antología de la poesía latinoamericana), and at Editorial Joaquín Mortiz, in Mexico City, a critical anthology of Latin American surrealism, Antología de la poesía surrealista latinoamericana. The latter book was enthusiastically reviewed in Plural magazine by the writer Octavio Paz, who noted that it was "indispensable" to the study of local surrealism and that it marked the "end of gossip" about the phenomenon. It is seen by literary historians as "orthodox" in comparison with Pellegrini's earlier chrestomathy. In 1975, he edited in Madrid posthumous reissue of Cugler's Vi-l prezint pe Țeavă. The following year, at San José, Baciu put out a volume of his own essays on Costa Rica.

Meanwhile, Mira Baciu, who discovered her artistic talents and became Mele illustrator, had completed her specialization at the University of Strasbourg under Jacques Borel, she lectured in Spanish language, then became a professor of French. She befriended artist Jacques Hérold, who illustrated her poetry volume of 1973, Houla, Macumba, Hora. She died of cancer, on July 2, 1978, bequeathing her estate to fund a Romanian literature scholarship at the University of Hawaii.

Mira's death left Baciu in near-complete isolation from the Romanian-speaking public. As he later noted: "I literally have no one to whom I would read the things I write. There are at most ten Romanian speakers living in Honolulu and none of them, absolutely none, has ever been to a bookstore or a library to peek into, or to ask for, or to purchase a single book of poetry." He honored her memory with a 1979 semi-autobiographical novel, eponymously titled Mira. A new volume of his memoirs saw print in Honolulu in 1980, as Praful de pe tobă ("The Dust on the Drum"). It was taped by Virgil Ierunca and serialized by Radio Free Europe (RFE), which broadcast clandestinely into Romania.

In 1979, Antología de la poesía surrealista latinoamericana was reissued by the University of Valparaíso. Baciu also issued a new chrestomathy of Romanian-to-Spanish translations: 11+11 poetas rumanos contemporáneos, published by the National Autonomous University of Nicaragua (UNAN). In addition to putting out Mele and his own works therein, Baciu published the Spanish-language collection of his poetry, El que pierde gana ("He Who Loses Wins", UNAN, 1978) and Pasaporte y pãnuelo ("Passport and Handkerchief", Revista Conservadora del Pensamiento Centroamericano, 1982). He returned to Portuguese-language writing in 1982, with Carioca honorário ("An Honorary Carioca"), which came out in 1982 at Pernambuco's Edições Pirata, and Lavradio 98, a memoir of his work under Lacerda, at Editora Nova Fronteira of Rio. These were followed in 1984 by Un rumano en el Istmo ("A Romanian in the Isthmus"), at Universidad Veracruzana; and in 1985 by translations from Lucian Blaga (co-written with Eugenio Montejo), at Fundarte of Caracas, and a Heredia University biography of Francisco Amighetti. Among Baciu's later contributions include several essays such as Centroamericanos (San José, 1986) and a biography of Tristán Marof (La Paz, 1987).

=== Final years ===
Throughout the late 1970s and early '80s, despite Baciu's isolation, Mele managed to obtain collaborations from many other Romanian writers, acquiring a relevant role in Romanian literary history. It hosted selections from the poetry of George Ciorănescu, who was at the time a chronicler for RFE. Ciorănescu returned the favor by popularizing Baciu's work in one of his broadcasts. Mele was especially noted for its reissue of works by the 1940s Romanian avant-garde. Baciu repeatedly tried to persuade Sesto Pals, who had returned to his regular job as an engineer, to publish a selection of his lifetime works. The May 1985 issue of Mele was entirely dedicated to Pals' poetry. Baciu also tracked down and interviewed poet-draftsman Paul Păun, who, like Pals, moved from Romania to Israel. However, his friendship with Lucian Boz had deteriorated from 1978, when Mele hosted a piece by César Tiempo, seen by Boz as "ferociously antisemitic".

Baciu maintained a close relationship with dissidents and avant-garde writers in his native Romania—over 100 people, according to concerned Securitate operatives. Such figures include Nicolae Carandino, Alexandru Paleologu, Radu Tudoran, Corneliu Coposu, Ion Dezideriu Sîrbu, Constantin Noica, Dan Culcer and Daniela Crăsnaru. He also corresponded with Constantin Mateescu, who provided him with references for the history of Mira's native city, Râmnicu Vâlcea. As Mateescu recalls, Vâlcea was still Baciu's "charming land". Baciu wrote a complete list of his own works, addressing it to literary critic Nicolae Steinhardt; like his other letters home, it was intercepted by the Securitate.

As remarked by Mateescu, in 1984 the correspondence was abruptly interrupted, "even though [Baciu], well informed about our country's realities, was prudent and restrained in his statements". Baciu's file shows that the Securitate also made note of this prudence, and was undecided about how to interpret it:

Albeit he misses his country, [Baciu] does not wish to return for a visit, his refusal backed up by confused explanations, by 'poetic' statements according to which 'he carries his country inside him'. Although [Baciu] is adamant about his refusal of our country's current socio-political system, one may conclude that his literary activity, his propagation of Romanian literature, art and traditions, is positive in nature.

The secret police repeatedly tried but failed to recruit Baciu's Romanian relatives as informants, and resorted to harassing them at their workplaces.

With some of his late works of autofiction, Baciu saluted the anticommunist revolt in his native Brașov. He was enthusiastic about the success of Romania's 1989 Revolution. According to his diaspora friend Constantin Eretescu, he hoped to see a rapid transition to a Western-style democracy, but was soon disappointed by the National Salvation Front regime. Interviewed by Marta Petreu for Apostrof, he noted that "one has a hard time adjusting after forty-six years in exile". His contribution was honored abroad: retired from Hawaii University as a professor emeritus, he was also Bolivia's honorary consul in Honolulu. In 1991, he became Commander of the Bolivian Order of Merit.

Baciu died in Honolulu on January 6, 1993, allegedly while talking to his sister Ioana over the phone. His corpus of works, beginning with Poemele poetului tânăr, was being republished in Romania, following efforts by his sister and his brother-in-law, Ovidiu Mărgineanu. A new edition of Praful de pe tobă saw print at Editura Eminescu in 1995. Mira was also republished, by Editura Albatros, in 1998. In 2006, when his Cetatea lui Bucur was reissued to critical acclaim, the "Yellow House" in Brașov was opened for the public as a Ștefan Baciu Memorial House, presently maintained by Brașov City Hall.

== Poetry ==
Critic Vladimir Streinu saw Ștefan Baciu's early poetry as "boastful", but lacking "a timber of its own", and ultimately "neutral". His first surrealist episode was with Start, ridiculed at the time by the mainstream review Viața Românească for its "jolly good" metaphors: "It tells us that hounds feed on warm meat and that legs will sing when they walk." In Poeme de dragoste, Streinu suggests, "the tone is youthful", but the subject matter is excessively lyrical and self-absorbed.

The poet soon moved into a more traditionalist format, with echoes from Ion Pillat and Parnassianism. The result is visualized by critic Daniel Cristea-Enache as a "lace of impressionism" with a "thin but strong" expressionistic thread. According to România Literară reviewer Cosmin Ciotloș, this is an "exact and painstaking", but also "stunning", species of poetry. In Cetatea lui Bucur, Baciu outlined his vision of a decadent-but-fascinating Bucharest, with its many paradoxes: "How much I hate thee, my beloved city"; "Your bitter joy has done me in". As noted by Ciotloș, in Baciu's Bucharest "everything is alive, everything is artificial". The poetic cycle shows Baciu as a social critic, repulsed by the luxurious churches surrounded by slums, but also fascinated with the morbid aspects of Bucharest society, from the "grave-blackened women" of Bellu cemetery to the pleasure-seekers on Calea Victoriei—as noted by Cristea-Enache, the latter is merely an anti-capitalist "cliché of that era".

Political inspiration also fueled some of Baciu's other juvenile works, including poems attacking the Nazis and honoring the August 23 Coup—written with a Social Democratic bias but owing ultimate inspiration to Vladimir Mayakovsky, the Soviet poet laureate. His more conventional humorous poetry, which came out around 1945, owed inspiration to the jocular verse of Păstorel Teodoreanu and George Topîrceanu.

Returning to the avant-garde with Muzica sferelor, with its homages to unconventional heroes such as Urmuz and George Ciprian, Baciu crafted his own poetic style. In large part, such lyrical work is explicitly self-referential, and inevitably linked to his diaspora experience. His nostalgia for Râmnicu Vâlcea and Brașov slowly replaced his memory of Bucharest. As noted by philologist Andrei Bodiu, he was not Brașov's first poetic chronicler, but the only such poet to be "urban and cosmopolitan" rather than elegiac and traditionalist. Baciu wrote poems dedicated in part to each Latin American country he visited, and made unexpected connections between them and his native country. One such piece, honoring the Cuban dissident movement, reads:

Scriu Cuba și gândesc la tine, Românie:
cizme și tunuri și tancuri și-avioane
venind fără încetare din Răsărit
pun țării întregi un deget pe buze.
E ora acum când poporul tăcut se ridică
Noaptea în somn, rasuflă închisorile
și peste valurile mării care vin și se duc
se-aude un zgomot surd de lanțuri.
Ca păsări mari pe cerul antilian
Alunecă umbre nevazute de rachete.
Se-agită mâini ce scriu mesagii secrete.
Scriu Cuba și gândesc la tine, Românie.

Translation:

I write Cuba, but think of thee, Romania:
of the boots and cannons and tanks and planes
as they pour in, seemingly unending, from the East,
sealing with a finger the lips of a country.
Now is that hour when the silent folk arises
At sleep-time, at night, the prisons exhale
and over the waves of the sea, coming and going,
we catch a faint noise, that of rattling chains.
Like the great birds of the Antillean sky
The unseen shadows of missiles glide by.
Hands shuffle about to write secret postings.
I write Cuba, but think of thee, Romania.

Baciu's other poems include a set of pastiches and parody pieces, from Emil Botta, Lucian Blaga, Ion Barbu and Ion Vinea. They stand alongside satirical pieces targeting poets who had made compromises with the political system. In one such work, Baciu scolds Tudor Arghezi:

Când punea tocul
pe-o carte
ca să scrie un cuvânt
așteptai să curgă din condei
literele, una câte una:
"FACTURĂ" sau "BON".
Îl chemase Ion N. Theodorescu
apoi Tudor Arghezi
dar vor mai trebui să treacă
o sută de ani
până să-i putem spune numele
fără silă.
(Tocmai pentru că nu-l mai chema Theodorescu.)

Translation:

When he applied his pen
to a book
and wrote a word down
one expected letters to flow,
one after the other:
"INVOICE"or "BILL".
His name had been Ion N. Theodorescu
then Tudor Arghezi
but a full hundred years
shall have to pass
before we may speak out his name
without loathing.
(Precisely because he's no longer a Theodorescu.)
