= Chignell =

Chignell is a surname. Notable people with the surname include:

- Andrew Chignell, American philosopher
- Charlie Chignell (1866–1952), England-born South African rugby union player
- Hugh Scott Chignell (died 1950), Dean of Kimberley, South Africa
- Mark Chignell (born 1956), Canadian academic
- Thomas Chignell (1880–1965), English first-class cricketer
