= Negulești =

Negulești may refer to several villages in Romania:

- Negulești, a village in Dealu Morii Commune, Bacău County
- Negulești, a village in Piatra Șoimului Commune, Neamț County
