= Connie Bensley =

British poet (born 1929)

- Born: 1929 (age 96–97); London, United Kingdom
- Occupations: Poet and playwright

Connie Bensley (born 1929) is a British poet and playwright.

== Life and career ==
Bensley was born in south-west London in 1929. Her poetry was first published in literary journals in the late 1970s, and her first collection, Progress Report, was published in 1981. Her poetry has been included in anthologies such as the Faber Book of Twentieth-Century Women's Poetry (1987) edited by Fleur Adcock. She has also written several radio and television plays. The Oxford Companion to Twentieth-Century Literature in English describes her writing as characterised by "an incisive clarity and appealing wit".

== Selected works ==
- Progress Report (Peterloo Poets, 1981)
- Moving In (Peterloo Poets, 1984)
- Central Reservations: New and Selected Poems (Bloodaxe Books, 1990)
- Choosing to Be a Swan (Bloodaxe Books, 1994)
- The Back & the Front of It (Bloodaxe Books, 2000)
- Private Pleasures (Bloodaxe Books, 2007)
- Finding a Leg to Stand On: New & Selected Poems (Bloodaxe Books, 2012)
