= Piatra Șoimului =

- Commune
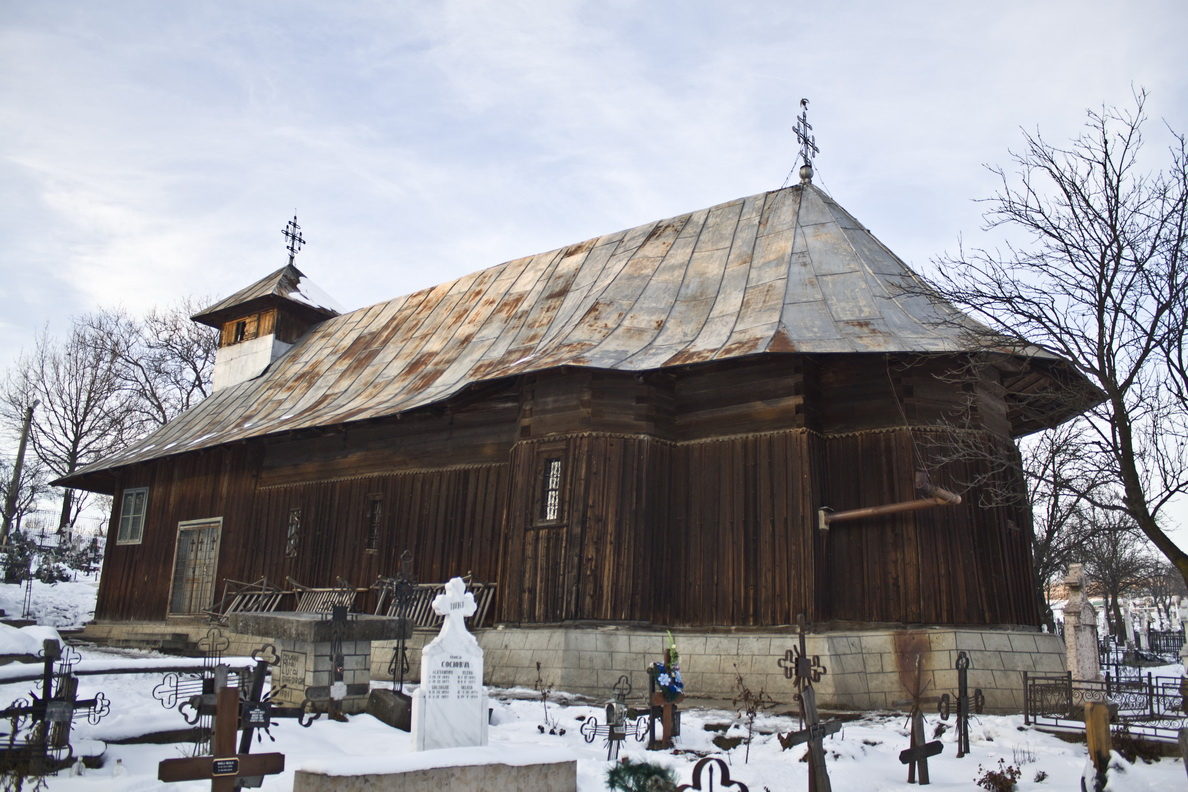
- Saint John Bogoslov wooden church in Piatra Șoimului village

- Location in Neamț County

- Location in Romania
- Coordinates: 46°50′N 26°26′E
- Country: Romania
- County: Neamț

Government
  - Mayor (2024–2028): Neculai Nicorescu (PSD)
- Area: 144.98 km^{2} (55.98 sq mi)
- Elevation: 343 m (1,125 ft)
- Population (2021-12-01): 6,950
  - Density: 47.9/km^{2} (124/sq mi)
- Time zone: UTC+02:00 (EET)
  - Summer (DST): UTC+03:00 (EEST)
- Postal code: 617320
- Area code: (+40) x33
- Vehicle reg.: NT
- Website: www.primariapiatrasoimului.ro

Piatra Șoimului is a commune in Neamț County, Western Moldavia, Romania. It is composed of four villages: Luminiș, Negulești, Piatra Șoimului, and Poieni.

== Geography ==
The commune is located in the south-central part of the county, in the foothills of the Tarcău Mountains. It is situated 4 km (2.5 mi) west of the town of Roznov and 19 km (12 mi) south of the county seat, Piatra Neamț. The river Calul flows through the villages of Poieni and Piatra Șoimului, while the river Iapa flows through Negulești and Luminiș; both rivers discharge into the Bistrița in Chintinici.

There is a legend that links the names of the two rivers, Calul (the Horse) and Iapa (the Mare), to the studs of Stephen the Great. Traveling upstream along the river Calul, through the village of Poieni, one reaches the rock that gives the name of the commune, Piatra Șoimului (Falcon's Rock).

Historical population
| Year | Pop. | ±% |
|---|---|---|
| 1992 | 8,601 | — |
| 2002 | 7,953 | −7.5% |
| 2011 | 5,587 | −29.7% |
| 2021 | 6,950 | +24.4% |
Source: Census data

== History ==
At the end of the 19th century, the commune was called Calu-Iapa and was part of Piatra-Muntele plasa of Neamț County. It consisted of the villages of Calu, Dumbrava Roșie de Jos, Iapa, and Săvinești, with a total of 2,955 inhabitants. At the time, there were twelve water mills, a sawmill, three churches, and a school in the commune. The 1925 Socec Yearbook records the dissolution of the commune and the transfer of its villages to the administration of a neighboring commune, Mastacănu (present-day Borlești).

The commune was re-established in 1931 under the name of Calu, with the villages of Calu, Iapa, and Negulești. In 1950, Calu commune was assigned to the Buhuși raion, and after 1964, to the Piatra Neamț raion of Bacău Region. In 1964, the name of the commune and the village of residence was changed to Piatra Șoimului, and the village of Iapa was renamed Luminiș. In 1968, the commune of Piatra Șoimului returned to the re-established Neamț County.
