= Grete Tartler =

Romanian writer and diplomat (born 1948)

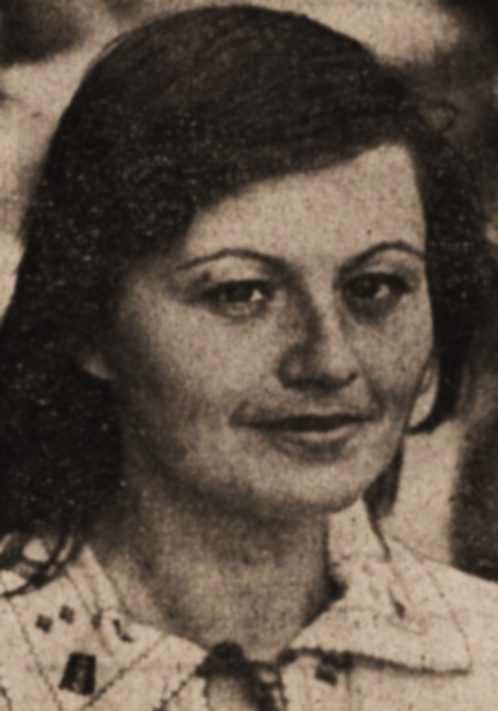
- Tartler in 1982
- Born: Margareta Tartler; November 23, 1948 (age 77); Bucharest, Romania
- Education: University of Bucharest (PhD)
- Occupations: Writer and diplomat
- Spouse: Stelian Tăbăraș (died 2009)
- Children: 1
- Writing career
- Notable awards: Grand Officer of the Romanian National Order of Merit (2000); Mihai Eminescu National Poetry Prize (2024)

Margareta Tăbăraşi (née Tartler; born 23 November 1948) is a Romanian poet, translator, children's author, essayist and diplomat. She has published over a dozen poetry collections since the 1970s, and her poems have been translated into other languages and widely anthologised. She was made a Grand Officer of Romania's National Order of Merit in 2000 in recognition of her service as a diplomat, and in 2024 she was awarded the Mihai Eminescu National Poetry Prize.

== Education and family ==
Tartler was born in Bucharest on 23 November 1948, and is of Transylvanian Saxon ancestry. She grew up in a bilingual household with both parents speaking German, and attended a German school. Robert Murray Davis writes in World Literature Today that her writing has inescapable political connotations given her upbringing in Romania's communist era. She graduated from the Bucharest Conservatory of Music in 1972 and from the University of Bucharest with a degree in Arabic and English in 1976. She obtained her doctorate in philosophy from the University of Bucharest in 1995.

Tartler was married to fellow Romanian writer Stelian Tăbăraș, who died in 2009. They have one daughter, Ana-Stanca Tabarasi-Hoffmann, a researcher, literary critic and translator. She has said that her poetry for children is inspired by family life with her husband and daughter.

== Poetry ==
Tartler's poetry was first published in the magazine Amfiteatru in 1968, when she was a music student at the conservatory. Her first poetry collection, Apa Vie ("The Water of Life"), was published soon after, in 1970. It was followed by the collections Chorale (1974), Hore ("Dancing the Hora", 1977), Astronomia ierbii ("The Astronomy of Herbs", 1981), Scrisori de acreditare ("Credentials", 1982), Substituiri (1983) and Achene zburătoare ("Winged Achenes", 1986).

In 1978 and 1985 she received the Writers' Union of Romania poetry prize, and in 1982 she received the Romanian Academy poetry prize. In 1985, Ștefan Augustin Doinaș reviewed the three collections that had been published between 1980 and 1985 for România Literară; he admired her lyricism and the development of her poetic talent.

In 1989, her collection Orient Express, translated into English by Fleur Adcock, was published by Oxford University Press. In 1995 Tartler's poetry appeared in An Anthology of Romanian Women Writers, published by Columbia University Press and edited by Adam J. Sorkin and Kurt Treptow. A review of the anthology in World Literature Today said Tartler "brings to poetry her games of erudition and is at times profound, at others coquettishly ironic and extravagant". Her poetry has also been translated into French by Linda Maria Baros and into Swedish by Jon Milos. Harold B. Segel has commented on her poetry's use of musical themes and elements, and the way her work reflects her knowledge of Arabic language and culture.

In the 1990s, Tartler's collections included Materia signata ("Designated Matter", 1992), Roșiile portocalii când sunt verzi sunt galbene ("Blood oranges when they are unripe are yellow", 1997). A collection of her selected poems from 1970 to 1995 was also published in 1995, titled Cuneiforme ("Cuneiforms").

In 2018, she published Cuvinte salvate, a collection of poems written from 2004 to 2018. The work was subtitled as poems written "with and without Stelian Tăbăraș" (her husband, who died in 2009). It was followed in 2019 by an anthology of her works from 1970 to 1990, including some unpublished poetry, Versuri şi uscate. Almost a third of the anthology represented her children's poetry.

Tartler was awarded the Mihai Eminescu National Poetry Prize for 2024, which is awarded in recognition of a poet's entire body of work. She received a cash prize of 40,000 lei and honorary citizenship of the city of Botoșani. The Botoșani City Hall will also fund the publication of an anthology of her poetry.

Tropar. Astázi, a volume of Tartler's new poetry, was published in 2025. A review in the literary journal Steaua observes that the title references a short religious hymn followed by the word "today".

== Diplomacy, translation and other work ==
From 1992 onwards Tartler served as a diplomat in Austria, Denmark, Iceland and Greece, including from 1997 to 2001 serving as ambassador to Copenhagen and Reykjavik, serving as the cultural attaché in Vienna, and serving as plenipotentiary in Athens. In 2000 she was made a Grand Officer in Romania's National Order of Merit for services to the country's foreign policy. As of 2015 Tartler was an associate professor at the National University of Political Studies and Public Administration and researcher at the Paul Celan Centre of Excellence in the University of Bucharest.

She has written several non-fiction works about Europe. Her 2001 book Europa națiunilor, Europa rațiunilor ("Europe of Nations, Europe of Motives") looks at European nationalism. In 2006 she published a sequel titled Identitate europeană; a review in the journal of the Romanian Diplomatic Institute describes it as an "in-depth and nuanced professional meditation on Europe as a space of multiple identities".

Tartler's translation work is extensive, and includes translations both to and from Romanian in German, Arabic, Persian, English, French, Danish and Greek. Notably, she translated the German novel Perfume by Patrick Süskind into Romanian in the late 1980s. She has said the translation process took her about a year, and she originally undertook it of her own initiative (without having been approached by a publisher). Other authors she has translated include Goethe and Hans Christian Andersen, and she has translated Romanian authors into German for the journal Neue Literatur.

In 2020 Tartler and Elena Lazăr were awarded the Greek State Literary Award for the translation of a Greek literary work into a foreign language, in relation to their translation of the work of Kostas Karyotakis into Romanian.

== Selected works ==
=== Poetry ===
- Apa Vie, Eminescu, 1970
- Chorale, Cartea Românească, 1974
- Hore, Cartea Românească, 1977
- Astronomia ierbii, Cartea Românească, 1981
- Scrisori de acreditare, Eminescu, 1982
- Substituiri, Cartea Românească, 1983
- Achene zburătoare, Cartea Românească, 1986
- Materia Signata, Cartea Românească, 1992 (republished 2004)
- Roșiile portocalii când sunt verzi sunt galbene, Albatros, 1997
- Cuneiforme (selected poems published between 1970 and 1995) Helicon, 1997
- Cuvinte salvate. Poezii 2004–2018 (Cu şi fără Stelian Tăbăraş), Omonia, 2018
- Versuri şi uscate, Junimea, 2019
- Tropar. Astázi, Scoala Ardeleaná, 2025

=== Other works ===
- Europa națiunilor, Europa rațiunilor (non-fiction), Cartea Românească, 2001
- Identitate europeană (non-fiction), Cartea Românească, 2006
