= Faber Book of Twentieth-Century Women's Poetry =

Poetry anthology

- Author: Fleur Adcock
- Language: English
- Genre: Poetry
- Publisher: Faber and Faber
- Publication date: 1987
- Publication place: United Kingdom
- Media type: print
- Pages: xvii, 330 pages
- ISBN: 0571136923
- Dewey Decimal: 821/.91/0809287
- LC Class: PR1177 .F34 1987

The Faber Book of Twentieth-Century Women's Poetry is a poetry anthology edited by Fleur Adcock that was published in 1987 by Faber and Faber. Sixty-four writers born between 1869 (Charlotte Mew) and 1945 (Selima Hill) are represented. Adcock organizes the anthology chronologically according to the birth of each contributor. The poets are mainly from the UK or the US, with several others from Australia (4), Canada (4), Ireland (2), and New Zealand (4), as may be discovered from the appended biographical sketches. Two hundred and twenty-five (225) complete poems or excerpts of longer poems comprise the collection. In the introduction, Adcock argues that there is "no particular tradition" to distinguish women's poetry from that of men. She writes, "What is different about poetry by women, of course, is not its nature but the fact that until recently it has been undervalued and to some extent neglected."

== Poets included (in alphabetical order) ==
Fleur Adcock – Margaret Atwood – Margaret Avison – Elizabeth Bartlett – Patricia Beer – Frances Bellerby – Connie Bensley – Mary Ursula Bethell – Elizabeth Bishop – Louise Bogan – Eavan Boland – Gwendolyn Brooks – Eiléan Ni Chuilleanáin – Amy Clampitt – Gillian Clarke – Jane Cooper – Wendy Cope – Frances Cornford – Elizabeth Daryush – Rosemary Dobson – Freda Downie – Lauris Edmond – U. A. Fanthorpe – Elaine Feinstein – Tess Gallagher – Louise Glück – Barbara Guest – H. D. – Gwen Harwood – Selima Hill – Molly Holden – Robin Hyde – Elizabeth Jennings – June Jordan – Jenny Joseph – Maxine Kumin – Denise Levertov – Gwendolyn MacEwen – Sandra McPherson – Charlotte Mew – Josephine Miles – Edna St. Vincent Millay – Elma Mitchell – Marianne Moore – Lorine Niedecker – P. K. Page – Ruth Pitter – Sylvia Plath – Adrienne Rich – Judith Rodriguez – Muriel Rukeyser – Carol Rumens – E. J. Scovell – Edith Sitwell – Stevie Smith – Anne Stevenson – May Swenson – Anne Szumigalski – Jean Valentine – Ellen Bryant Voigt – Sylvia Townsend Warner – Anna Wickham – Judith Wright – Elinor Wylie

== Etext ==
- Adcock, Fleur, ed. Faber Book of Twentieth-Century Women's Poetry. London: Faber and Faber, 1987. (Open access to full text with free registration at the Internet Archive)
