= Calul (Bistrița) =

Calul Calu
- Location within Romania

Location
- Country: Romania
- Counties: Neamț County
- Villages: Poieni, Piatra Șoimului

Physical characteristics
- Mouth: Bistrița
  - location: Piatra Șoimului
  - coordinates: 46°50′17″N 26°29′2″E
- Length: 20 km (12 mi)
- Basin size: 62 km^{2} (24 sq mi)

Basin features
- Progression: Bistrița→ Siret→ Danube→ Black Sea
- Tributaries
  - left: Falcău, Stăunoi

The Calul or Calu is a right tributary of the river Bistrița in Romania. It discharges into the Bistrița in Piatra Șoimului, near Roznov. Its length is 20 km (12 mi) and its basin size is 62 km^{2} (24 sq mi).
