= Iapa (Bistrița) =

- Location within Romania

Location
- Country: Romania
- Counties: Neamț
- Villages: Negulești, Luminiș

Physical characteristics
- Source: Munții Goșmanului
- Mouth: Bistrița
  - location: Chintinici
  - coordinates: 46°49′58″N 26°29′52″E
- Length: 24 km (15 mi)
- Basin size: 75 km^{2} (29 sq mi)

Basin features
- Progression: Bistrița→ Siret→ Danube→ Black Sea
- Tributaries
  - left: Chilii
  - right: Mânza, Mânișu, Piceala, Jilabău, Tilișeu, Mălina

The Iapa is a right tributary of the river Bistrița in Romania. It flows into the Bistrița in Chintinici near Roznov. Its length is 24 km (15 mi) and its basin size is 75 km^{2} (29 sq mi).
