= Kathy Evans =

English journalist and women's rights activist (1948–2003)

- Born: Katherine Margaret Evans; 24 October 1948; Wokingham, England, United Kingdom
- Died: 17 November 2003 (aged 55)
- Occupations: Journalist; Women's rights activist
- Years active: 1960s–2003

Katherine Margaret Evans (24 October 1948 – 17 November 2003) was an English journalist and women's rights activist in Islamic countries. She was a reporter of events occurring in the Middle East for The Daily Star, the Financial Times; Guardian Unlimited in Afghanistan and Pakistan from 1989 to 1991; the International Herald Tribune; The Middle East Magazine; The Sunday Times and The Times. Evans setup the charitable foundation Kathy Evans Education Trust in Kabul in 2001 in aid of Afghan adolescents and women.

== Biography ==
Katherine Margaret Evans was born in Wokingham, England, on 24 October 1948. Evans was raised in Abingdon-on-Thames in Oxfordshire, and was educated at John Mason School in Abingdon. Following secretarial work doing a Pitman shorthand typist's course, she moved to London and began working for the staff on the shipping magazine Dock and Harbour as a reporter. At the age of 21, Evans left to go to the Middle East. She arrived in Beirut and she persuaded the editor of the English-language publication The Daily Star to allow her to join as a reporter in 1970. She reported on the 1973 Yom Kippur War when Egypt and Syria attacked Israel but were defeated after a few days of fighting. Evans would later report on how refugees from Palestine were placed into camps on Lebanese waste ground.

Evans became The Daily Star's chief investigative reporter and became involved in local politics, with one of her reports being on how marijuana benefited cancer patients affected by the side effects of chemotherapy. Another report of hers saw her wandering around in the dark at Tehran holding a heavy and large jar filled with hashish with a Western colleague when the Iranian Revolution was occurring. Following the closure of The Daily Star as a result of the Lebanese Civil War beginning in 1975, Evans moved to the Gulf, reporting for international newspapers and journals of events such as disturbances, revolutions and wars occurring in the Middle East such as the BBC Eastern Services in London; Financial Times; Guardian Unlimited in Afghanistan and Pakistan from 1989 to 1991; the International Herald Tribune; The Middle East Magazine; The Sunday Times and The Times.

She also briefly worked as an oil analyst in Dallas, Texas. A diagnosis of breast cancer meant Evans had to retire from journalism in the early 1990s. She was a campaigner on women's rights in Islamic countries. She noticed up to 70 female prisoners in the Saudi Dammam prison complex being subjected to temperatures of up to 49 °C (120 °F) and had a very small exercise yard. Evans visited the Qom in Iran in an attempt to interview the house arrested moderate Hussein-Ali Montazeri and warned of radicalised graduates being destined for military training away from Tehran or in Lebanon's lawless Beqaa Valley. She reported in Kuwait City in collaboration with the British Army in 1991 following the expulsion of Iraqi troops. Evans reported on Osama bin Laden's career before others noticed his significance and reported in July 1997 that the Central Intelligence Agency were planning to abduct him by conducting a snatch operation and that he was moved to the Taliban's headquarters in Kandahar for his safety.

Evans reported on how the daughters of Saddam Hussein coped with their situation in Baghdad. In 1995, she won an Amnesty International Press Award, for "an investigation into the plight of women accused of adultery in Pakistan, who were being imprisoned under repressive Islamic laws and then raped by the police." She was a campaigner of women's rights in Islamic countries. Following the demise of the Taliban in 2001, Evans established the charitable foundation Kathy Evans Education Trust in order to establish a school in Kabul so that Afghan adolescents and women could be taught carpet-weaving, jewellery-making and literacy and to slow the trade of mostly exported semi-precious stones.

== Personal life ==
She was divorced on two separate occasions. Evans died on 17 November 2003.

== Approach ==
Pat Lancaster of The Middle East Magazine wrote of Evans's approach "Kathy was a skilled and exciting writer, fearless in her approach. When she "locked on" to a story she pursued it to the exclusion of all else." She added: "Kathy always employed a down to earth approach. She had a knack of writing even the most complex story in a way that made it accessible to everyone. She had a loathing of pomposity and pretension and the razor sharp wit to attack and deflate it, whenever she could."
