= Mekeel McBride =

American poet (born 1950)

- Born: 1950 (age 74–75) Pittsburgh, Pennsylvania, U.S.
- Occupation: Poet, professor
- Education: Mills College (BA)

Mekeel McBride (born 1950) is a poet and professor of writing at the University of New Hampshire. She has held fellowships at the Radcliffe Institute for Advanced Study at Harvard University, Princeton University, and the MacDowell Colony, as well as being a recipient of two National Endowment for the Arts grants. She is the author of six books of poetry.

== Biography ==
McBride was born in Pittsburgh, Pennsylvania. She holds a Bachelor's in Arts degree from Mills College in California. She later settled in Kittery, Maine.

McBride has taught at Wheaton College, (Note: Multiple sources reference Wheaton College, but it is unclear which Wheaton College is intended.) Berwick Academy, Harvard University, and Princeton University.

After this, McBride began teaching in the Master of Fine Arts writing program at the University of New Hampshire and was also teaching undergraduate classes. She encourages her students to embrace their own creativity, playfulness, and daydreaming, and her classes frequently encourage combining poetry with other kinds of art. For example, to teach students to listen to sound in a different way, McBride has asked students to design a musical instrument and accompany a poem with it; instruments have included crystal glasses filled with water and automobile engines.

== Works ==
Much of her work draws on the semi-rural areas of New Hampshire and Maine where she lives, and includes elements from working class life: beat-up cars, harmonicas, trash, barbecues, and many, many dogs... This is a poetry that is broadly democratic in a way that Emerson would have liked. And unlike traditionally lyrical poetry, where we might expect mere pathos — or, worse, condescension — her poems allow a strangeness and value to working-class experience.

— David Gruber

McBride's poems have appeared in publications including The New Yorker, Poetry Field, Seneca Review, Antioch Review, The Nation, Kayak, Virginia Quarterly Review, Ploughshares, and the Georgia Review. Her poem "All Hallows' Eve" was included in the Best American Poetry 1992, Edited by Charles Simic.

Linda Gregerson's review of McBride's 1983 collection The Going Under of the Evening Land,, wrote that "At their best, McBride's negotiations between expectation and creative license achieve an exquisite balance."

David Gruber, reviewing her compendium Dog Star Delicatessen, described her "ongoing, underlying resistance to the constraints of normative lyrical language" and said "I believe there is a great beauty and humanity at work in McBride's poetry. Her work offers us a world in which the ordinary can give way to the transcendent, if we will allow it to." He also likened her themes to Elizabeth Bishop's ("Like Bishop, McBride sees animals as fellow sufferers along with humanity here on earth.")

Kettle

An old woman gets tired of her sad face
so she fills her soup bowl with fresh water
then stares into that small lake until she sees
her reflection floating there but softened.
She smiles and when she does that,
her sadness gets tricked into the bowl,
surprised to be lightened a little at last.
Then she takes that bowl into high grass
and leaves it there for the rough tongues
of homeless cats to scratch across;
for starlight to see itself in.
Now, who knows whether she is old
or young, this woman who tricks away despair.
She's laughing as she peels the wrinkled skins
from red potatoes, drooping them moon

by moon into evening's kettle: new root soup.
— Mekeel McBride, "Kettle", The Deepest Part of the River

Collections

- Dog Star Delicatessen: New and Selected Poems, 1979-2006, 2006
- The Deepest Part of the River, 2001
- Red Letter Days, 1998
- Wind of the White Dresses, 1995
- The Going Under of the Evening Land, 1983
- No Ordinary World, 1979
