= Grigore Cugler =

Romanian writer, musician and poet (1903–1972)

Grigore Cugler Gregório (Gregori) Cugler
- Born: April 20, 1903; Roznov, Neamț County, Kingdom of Romania
- Died: September 30, 1972 (aged 69); Lima, Peru
- Occupations: short story writer, poet, humorist, illustrator, composer, violinist, diplomat
- Writing career
- Pen name: Apunake
- Period: 1934–1972
- Genres: sketch story, lyric poetry, satire, parody, memoir
- Movement: avant-garde

Grigore Cugler (Romanian pronunciation: [ɡriˈɡore ˈkuɡler]; Spanish: Gregorio or Gregori Cugler; also known under the pen name Apunake; 20 April [O.S. 7 April] 1903 – September 30, 1972) was a Romanian avant-garde short story writer, poet and humorist. Also noted as a graphic artist, composer and violinist, he was a decorated World War I veteran who served as the Romanian Kingdom's diplomatic representative in various countries before and after World War II. The nephew of poet Matilda Cugler-Poni, he was the author of unconventional and often irreverent pieces, which have drawn parallels with the work of Alfred Jarry and Urmuz. Their author was celebrated by some of his generation colleagues for his independent voice in Romanian literature.

An anti-communist, Cugler renounced his post in 1947, just before the establishment of a communist regime, and lived the final decades of his life in Peru. Promoted by the Romanian diaspora but largely ignored at home until the Romanian Revolution of 1989, he became the subject of interest in post-communist literary criticism.

== Biography ==
=== Early life and family ===
On his paternal side, Cugler descended from an ethnic German family of Austrian nobility. His ancestor, Maximilian von Kugler (1790—1868), was a Habsburg civil servant and lawyer who moved to Moldavia to serve for the prince Mihail Sturdza. Members of the family had settled in Moldavia by the middle of the 19th century, and his great-grandfather Karl von Kugler, later known as Carol von Cugler, was employed as urban planner in Iași, and became a naturalized Romanian citizen. His daughter and Grigore's aunt, Matilda, was a noted poet who associated with the literary society Junimea, and whose second husband was chemist Petre Poni.

Born in Roznov, Neamț County, Cugler was the son of Grigore Cugler and his wife Ana, daughter of Universul journalist Nicolae Țincu. He was also the cousin of art critic Petru Comarnescu.

Cugler graduated from the Romanian Army's college at Dealu Monastery. Later, speaking of himself in the third person, he recalled with irony that his graduation "pleases him to this day." He served in the World War I Romanian Campaign, was injured, and had his two fingers from his left hand amputated. In his own recollections, he spoke of his own involvement in the war as "a promenade", and indicated that the medals he received after being wounded in November 1916 were owed to him "not taking cover in time" while defending Pitești train station against the Central Powers' forces. He was subsequently present in Moldavia, the only region held by the Romanian authorities after the Central Powers occupied southern Romania. He referred to this period in his life as "dieting", alluding to the hardships of war, and indicating that this judgment also applied to occupied Bucharest.

=== Interwar literature and diplomatic service ===
In 1918, Cugler moved to Bucharest, where he studied at the University's Faculty of Law and the Music Conservatory. His teachers at the latter institution were celebrated musicians such as George Enescu, who reportedly held Cugler in high esteem, Alfons Castaldi, and Mihail Jora. The composer of several waltzes and lieder, Cugler won the Enescu Award for musical creativity in 1926. After 1927, he was assigned to a succession of diplomatic posts in Sweden, Switzerland, Germany, Denmark, and ultimately Norway. According to literary critic Florin Manolescu, he also represented Romania in Bratislava, at the time part of Czechoslovakia. While in Stockholm, he met Ulla Gerda Lizinca Matilda Dyrssen, also known as Ulrike or Ulrica Dyrssen, daughter of a Swedish diplomat and granddaughter of a Swedish Navy commander, and, in 1937, married her in Bucharest.

He was an adept of anthroposophy.

In 1933–1934, he debuted as a writer with a series of unusual sketch stories, poems and aphorisms, all of which were first published the magazine Vremea. It is however probable that his earliest literary experiments were published by his cousin Petru Comarnescu in the magazine Tiparnița Literară around 1927–1928. Also in 1934, he completed and printed his first volume, titled Apunake și alte fenomene ("Apunake and Other Phenomenons"). The writing was illustrated with his own drawings, which he himself fancied as a means to cause "unease" to his readers. A subject of interest in the literary community, it generated a following among young intellectuals, some of whom titled themselves apunakiști ("apunakists"), while Cugler himself became confounded with his character and came to bear his name. In 1946, he issued another volume of his works, named Vi-l prezint pe Țeavă ("Meet Țeavă"—țeavă being the Romanian for "pipe").

Grigore Cugler was opposed to the Romanian Communist Party's takeover of the country, effected in successive stages after World War II (see Socialist Republic of Romania). In late 1947, just after the Communist Ana Pauker took over as foreign minister, he decided to resign his diplomatic position, motivating his gesture in a letter to Pauker as the consequence of "the new orientation in Romanian government policies, which part with my convictions and sentiments". Manolescu argued that the choice of words was in contrast with the usual perception of their author as "trifling". Reportedly, Cugler's action caused consternation in Bucharest, where no one had yet attempted to confront Ana Pauker using such terms. He himself spoke of his departure as an "unlimited vacation", and, shortly before leaving, handed down copies of his texts for Vremea to his friend Petru Dumitraşcu.

=== Exile and final years ===
Together with his family, Cugler settled in Peru's capital, Lima. Reportedly, he picked his place of exile by randomly setting his finger on a spinning globe. He found a job as an insurance agent by day, indulging his musical passion in the evening, as a violin soloist for the Lima Philharmonic Orchestra. In November 1956, Peruvian Minister of Education Jorge Basadre appointed Cugler to a government commission supervising the activity of state-financed educational institutions in the field of music (the Commission for the Study of Musical Culture).

While in exile, Culger also issued his final volume, Afară-de-Unu-Singur (also spelled Afară de unul singur, both titles translating as "Out on One's Own"), which he issued as a samizdat and only printed in 50 copies. According to its author, the book had an earlier linotype edition, which had been printed in Bucharest before his departure. He defined this earlier volume as "discreet, elegant, but without a watch on its wrist and blowing even in yogurt" (in reference to the Romanian proverb "He who was once burned by soup will even blow to cool yogurt"). Late in his life, he completed various literary pieces such as a mock fairy tale "in cackling style", and the texts Amintiri din copilărie ("Memories of Childhood"), ...şi la lume iarăşi date ("...and Handed Back to the World"), and Cine fuse şi se duse ("Who Was It and Now Is Gone"). Many of these writings were also illustrated in his own hand, which he amusedly defined as "a worrying aspect".

Cugler maintained contacts with intellectuals of the Romanian diaspora, several of whom were reportedly fascinated by his work and character. Early on, he joined the Romanian National Committee, created by former premier Nicolae Rădescu as a member of the anti-communist and American-based Assembly of Captive European Nations, serving as its representative in the Peruvian capital. He was visited in Lima by poet Nicolae Petra, as well as by literary promoters Ştefan Baciu and Mircea Popescu, both of whom edited literary magazines for the community of exiles. The former two left memoirs on the period, in which they evidence that Cugler was pining for his native Romania, and that Romanian culture was dominant in his house. In 1968, he was interviewed for Radio Free Europe by prominent Romanian journalist Monica Lovinescu.

== Work ==
=== Main characteristics and the Apunake theme ===
Cugler wrote his work in Romanian, French and Spanish. In all, he was fluent in eight languages, including dialects of Arabic.

On original writer, defined by literary historian Paul Cernat as "eccentric", Cugler was not affiliated with any of the avant-garde trends. His work is often thought to have, at least in part, owed inspiration to Urmuz, a solitary avant-gardist of early 20th century Romanian literature. However, Manolescu indicates, he made a point of not joining any modernist trend. He never read Urmuz's stories, but was probably familiar with works by the rebellious French author Alfred Jarry and his work showed connections with Jarry's ’Pataphysics. In one of his stories, titled Superbardul ("The Super-Bard"), Cugler mocked Surrealism and its automatist techniques, depicting an imaginary writer who writes nonsensical syllables on strips of paper which he glues to all sorts of objects, and which he later assembles on a silvery string.

It has also been suggested that his personal style bears likeness to a variety of later works, and that it shares traits with the Absurdist plays of Eugène Ionesco. Comparisons have also been made between Cugler and another Absurdist playwright, Samuel Beckett, as well as between him and pessimistic Romanian philosopher Emil Cioran. Other writers whose work was argued to be similar with Cugler's include Christian Morgenstern, Lewis Carroll and Daniil Kharms.

Manolescu describes Cugler's literature as dominated by "a way of being opposed to routine, to ankylosing academism, to casern mentality and, in general, to all of our Pavlovian customs", while literary historian Alexandru Ruja sees his style and outlook as "the imponderability of writing, [...] the total liberty of creative attitudes", stressing that they amounted to "a different way of making literature". Cugler spoke of his own debut in literature as: "[I] started to pick on everybody." Manolescu proposed that the writer's perspective on life was "structuralist", and that it displayed "an intelligence blessed with an enormous associative capacity in respect to the most diverse patterns, identified as if in jest."

Florin Manolescu noted that these traits were present in the names he picked for his characters, objects, and the imaginary places they are to be found in, names which are often interconnected and usually puns: Kematta (from chemata, "the summoned female"), Adu Milmor-t (from adu-mi-l mort, "bring him to me dead"), termopil (a common noun version of Thermopylae, taking the form of manufacturing and commercial terminology) or Vesquenouille (a mock Francization of vezi că nu-i, "see that it's no longer there"). He proceeded to define such methods as "literary pantography".

Apunake, which centered on an eponymous character, was largely an allegory of Cugler, as he himself was to indicate in his later writings. In Manolescu's assessment, it is partly based on themes in Greek literature, owing inspiration to its popular novels, and constitutes a Jarry-like parody of science fiction and technicist subjects. Alexandru Ruja notes that the story disturbs fictional conventions from the very start, by mixing in "the impression of hanging on to a reality subject to the corrosive effect of irony." The piece debuts with the words: "By the end of the trail through the Nine Thousand Bells stood a wind mill. It was there that Apunake and Kematta experienced their first moments of love. To this day one can see the walls scratched from the inside by Kematta's fingernails, and on the doorstep may still read two lines she wrote during one night of passion, more specifically two alexandrines comprising only the syllable «Ah!»"

Searching for his estranged wife, Apunake travels through space and time, and each of his journey's stations, no matter how different or far apart, coincide with the date of July 1. In one of the episodes, while visiting a forest, Apunake is turned into a rubber ball at the hands of a wizard called Sportul ("The Sport"), which allows him to witness how an old woman is pumped up with air in order to become "a champion of free flight". Eventually reunited with his wife, the character fathers a monstrous child, who reaches enormous proportions and, in what is a reversal of happy end conventionalism, defecates on the entire audience.

=== Other writings ===
Like Apunake, his other works constituted attacks on literary and social conventions. In his sketch story Match nul ("Match Ending in a Draw"), Cugler depicted a boxing competition in which four people take part, having for its referee a conferencing hajduk, and ending in "cordiality". The series on cookbooks (eponymously titled Carte de bucate), sees Cugler advising on how to prepare items such as "Parisian mountain oysters", which involves the cook singing romanzas to the ingredients, or "Plumpy breasts" and "Tongue à la Princesse". Recipes may turn to off-topic statements, as is the case for the text recommending the "mountain oysters": "At the moment she rose from the divan and I saw her dishevelled hair reaching below her midsection, like a white silk cloak, but, whatever, why talk about it, these are things that one needs to see, not read about, I have decided, without any more doubt, in favor of short curly hair, that answers to caresses with glee and comeliness." This characteristic, Manolescu notes, was an illustration of the writer's technique as subtly outlined in the cookbooks' preface: "The hardest thing when one writes a cookbook is not to stray away from the topic. In what concerns me, I can say, without any sort of exaggeration, that, usually, I appeal more to women with fat legs than to those with slender legs. This simple detail is, I do believe, sufficient proof of my culinary intentions."

Prin Zăvoi, a prose work, is partly written as a dialog between two lovers, in which the phrase "When I receive a letter, I copy it and read the copy" is repeated several times. Other prose fragments include Florica, which takes the shape of two telephone conversations between the author and a woman named Florica Diaconescu, who shares her strange visions, and the false biography of a non-existing poet named Haralamb Olaru.

Among his poems is the Spanish-language Dos hermanas ("Two Sisters"), about two women falling in love with the same man and deciding not to fight over him for lack of bullets, and the assonant French-language Catulle, l'émule de ma mulle ("Catullus, the Emulator of My Mule"), which ends with the death of a suitcase. A Romanian-language piece, titled Cântec de leagăn ("Lullaby"), reads:

Copii, gândiţi-vă mereu,
chiar dacă azi pare cam greu,
că într-o zi, ca din senin,
când aştepta-veţi mai puţin,
o să aveţi şi voi copii,
o să aveţi şi voi copii.

Translation:

Children, always think,
even if it seems a bit hard today,
that, one day, out of the blue,
when you expect it the least,
you'll have children of your own,
you'll have children of your own.

Ruja argued that there was an intrinsic connection between Cugler's training as a musician and the pleasant sound of his lyrics. This, he proposed, was the case of pieces where "the absurd was reached" through "the alteration of regular meanings", but where the text was nonetheless arranged with intent. One of them read:

Ce mai aştepţi?
Pândeşte noaptea în fundul foselor nazale
S-a-nchis sertarul cu vertebre
Şi scrinul cu arşice goale
Cu irisuri uitate din a
căror adânc s-a scurs lumina
Şi cu secreţii personale
Spune-mi, ce mai aştepţi matale?

Translation:

What are you still waiting for?
The night stalks from the bottom of nasal cavities
The drawer of vertebrae was shut
As was the chest of dry knuckles
With forgotten irises from
whose depths light has trickled out
And with personal secretions
Tell me, what are you still waiting for?

== Legacy ==
Cugler's literary work was traditionally ignored at home and abroad, a fact which Florin Manolescu attributes to the perception that he was merely "a dabbler". Also according to Manolescu, the author found it hard to fit in the framework of his adoptive Latin American literature.

The tendency to reject Cugler's writings began early: as Manolescu noted, he was not reviewed at all in George Călinescu's History of Romanian Literature, which first saw print in 1941. Overall, Paul Cernat concluded, no work of literary criticism published during the interwar period ever mentioned his Apunake. In Communist Romania, he was almost never publicly mentioned. One exception to this rule is a fugitive 1983 note written by critic Constantin Ciopraga, who simply described Cugler as one of Urmuz's epigones, and argued that he lacked Urmuz's concision. In 1969, at a time when the Nicolae Ceauşescu regime offered a degree of liberalization, Surrealist writer Saşa Pană included Grigore Cugler in his anthology of Romanian avant-garde texts. He was not however present in similar collections, including the one edited by Ovid Crohmălniceanu. This tendency, Cernat argues, was owed in large part to Cugler's enduring status as an anti-communist, which prevented his writings from being mentioned or recuperated, in contrast to those of Urmuz.

While officially rejected, the writer was reportedly earning status in counter-culture and among dissidents: novelist and anti-communist activist Paul Goma recounted that deportees to the Bărăgan learned his texts by heart. Similarly, the Romanian diaspora was instrumental in preserving his legacy, beginning with 1950 reprints of his works in various exile magazines. Many of his literary pieces, which he himself had gathered in a dossier, survived after being copied by Ştefan Baciu, who kept his version at his residence in Honolulu and published excerpts from it in Mele, the journal of which he was editor. A posthumous 1975 edition of Vi-l prezint pe Ţeavă, with one of Cugler's autobiographical essays, was printed in Madrid, Spain, at the expense of Nicolae Petra, and illustrated with the author's own drawings. Alongside the Lovinescu interview (broadcast in 1972), he was the subject of a series of shows aired by BBC Romanian edition, first aired in February 1966 and titled De la Apunake citire ("Readings from Apunake").

Apunake's work was rediscovered at home after the Revolution of 1989. During the 1990s, the author became the subject of academic studies and had his work included in several anthologies. At the same time, he earned a small but dedicated following among the younger local writers. The Jimbolia-based Apunake literary club was established in his honor during 2003. In 2006, Cugler's writings were printed in a German-language edition, compiled by Romanian-born academic Horst Fassel on the basis of texts preserved by linguist Eugenio Coşeriu and titled Apunake. Eine andere Welt ("Apunake. Another World"). Cugler's works were printed in various editions by several publishing houses, beginning with a 1996 edition of his Apunake and a 1998 reprint of Afară-de-Unu-Singur in Manuscriptum magazine. In 2007, it was announced that director Alexandru Tocilescu was preparing a dramatization of Apunake, to be produced by the Comedy Theater in Bucharest.

In his adoptive Peru, Cugler was also progressively acknowledged as a writer and musician. In 1978, six years after his death, the magazine Caretas allocated space to an article outlining his career. On March 23, 2002, the Cultural Center of the Pontificia Universidad Católica del Perú in Lima hosted a concert dedicated to his memory.

Grigore Cugler and Ulla Dyrssen had three daughters together: Christina, born in Stockholm; Margaret, born in Oslo; and Alexandra, born in Lima. When his children were growing up, he jokingly nicknamed his first- and second-born, respectively, Asta (Romanian for "This one") and Aia ("That one").
