= Andrew Chignell =

American philosopher

- Born: 1973 (age 52–53)
- Awards: Andrew W. Mellon Fellowship, Fulbright Fellowship, Humboldt Fellowship

Education
- Education: Wheaton College (BA), Yale University (PhD)

Philosophical work
- Era: Contemporary philosophy
- Region: Western philosophy
- School: Analytic philosophy
- Institutions: Princeton University
- Main interests: Kant, philosophy of religion, ethics of belief, moral psychology
- Website: https://chignell.net/

Andrew Chignell (born 1973) is an American philosopher and the Laurance S. Rockefeller Professor of Religion at Princeton University. He is known for his work on Kant's philosophy. Chignell was the president of the North American Kant Society from 2020 to 2023. His research is focused on Kant and modern philosophy, the ethics of belief, aesthetics, philosophy of religion, and food ethics.

== Books ==
- Andrew Chignell, Terence Cuneo, and Matthew C. Halteman (eds.), Philosophy Comes to Dinner: Arguments About the Ethics of Eating, Routledge, 2016, ISBN 9780415806831.
- Evil: A History (ed.), New York: Oxford, 2019
- Andrew Chignell and Andrew Dole (eds.), God and the Ethics of Belief: Festschrift in honor of Nicholas Wolterstorff, New York: Cambridge, 2005
