= The Middle East in London =

British news magazine

- Frequency: Bi-monthly
- Publisher: London Middle East Institute
- Founded: 1974
- Final issue: June 2019
- Company: London Middle East Institute
- Country: United Kingdom
- Based in: London
- Language: English
- Website: The Middle East in London website

The Middle East in London was a magazine which covered news, business and culture in the Arab world from 1974 to June 2019.

== History and profile ==
The Middle East in London was started in 1974. The magazine was part of the London Middle East Institute and was published by the Institute on a bi-monthly basis. The London Middle East Institute is affiliated to SOAS. The magazine was formerly published monthly and changed the frequency to bi-monthly in January 2011. In June 2019 the final issue was published.
