= Mark Chignell =

Canadian academic

Mark H. Chignell
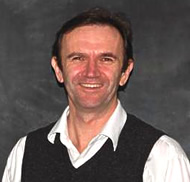
- Chignell in 2009
- Born: 1956
- Died: November 20, 2025
- Education: University of Canterbury
- Scientific career
- Workplaces: University of Toronto
- Thesis: Cognitive mechanisms of categorisation. (1980)

Mark H. Chignell was a Canadian academic specialising in usability and information science and, since 2002, was a full professor at the University of Toronto.

== Academic career ==
He had a PhD in psychology (University of Canterbury, New Zealand, 1981), and an MS in Industrial and Systems Engineering (Ohio State, 1984).

After a 1980 PhD titled 'Cognitive mechanisms of categorisation' at the University of Canterbury, Chignell moved to the University of Toronto, rising to full professor.

In 2003, Chignell founded Vocalage Inc., a company that does usability consulting, outsourced research, and software development.

He participated in a 2003 experiment which gave doctors online access to medical databases through a handheld iPAQ PC, which led to changes in the decisions the doctors made.

Chignell was the general chair of ACM Hypertext 2010.

== Selected works ==
- Abrams, David, Ronald Baecker, and Mark Chignell. "Information archiving with bookmarks: personal Web space construction and organization." In Conference on Human Factors in Computing Systems, vol. 98, pp. 41–48. 1998.
- Parsaye, Kamran, Mark Chignell, and Setrag Khoshafian. "Intelligent databases. Object-oriented, deductive hypermedia technologies." New York: Wiley, 1989 (1989).
- Parsaye, Kamran, and Mark Chignell. "Expert systems for experts." Earth Systems and Environment (1988).
- Zhao, Shengdong, Pierre Dragicevic, Mark Chignell, Ravin Balakrishnan, and Patrick Baudisch. "Earpod: eyes-free menu selection using touch input and reactive audio feedback." In Proceedings of the Conference on Human Factors in Computing Systems, pp. 1395–1404. ACM, 2007.
- Fitzmaurice, George W., Shumin Zhai, and Mark H. Chignell. "Virtual reality for palmtop computers." ACM Transactions on Information Systems (TOIS) 11, no. 3 (1993): 197–218.
