= Fleur Adcock =

New Zealand poet (1934–2024)

Fleur Adcock CNZM OBE
- Born: Kareen Fleur Adcock; 10 February 1934; Papakura, New Zealand
- Died: 10 October 2024 (aged 90); London, England
- Education: Victoria University of Wellington
- Occupations: Poet, editor
- Spouses: Alistair Te Ariki Campbell (m. 1952; div. 1958) Barry Crump (m. 1962; div. 1963)
- Children: 2
- Relatives: Marilyn Duckworth (sister)
- Writing career
- Notable awards: Queen's Gold Medal for Poetry (2006)

Fleur Adcock CNZM OBE (10 February 1934 – 10 October 2024) was a New Zealand poet, editor and translator. Born in Papakura, New Zealand, and raised partly in England, Adcock spent most of her adult life in the United Kingdom, where she became a prominent figure in contemporary poetry. Her work is characterised by wit, a conversational tone and psychological insights, and explores themes of identity, place and the complexities of human relationships.

Over a career spanning more than six decades, Adcock published around 20 poetry collections, and edited influential anthologies such as the Oxford Book of Contemporary New Zealand Poetry (1982). Her contributions to British and New Zealand literature were recognised with significant awards, including the Queen's Gold Medal for Poetry (2006), an OBE (1996), appointment as a Companion of the New Zealand Order of Merit (2008), and an honorary doctorate of literature from Victoria University of Wellington (2007). She was also a noted translator of medieval Latin and Romanian poetry.

== Early life and family ==
Adcock, the older of two sisters, was born in Papakura to Cyril John Adcock and Irene Robinson Adcock on 10 February 1934. Her father was a university professor and psychologist, and her mother was a writer. Adcock's birth name was Kareen Fleur Adcock, but she was known as Fleur and legally changed her name to Fleur Adcock in 1982. Her younger sister Marilyn (who became a novelist) was born the following year. In 1939, the family moved to London for Cyril's doctoral studies. The outbreak of World War II meant the family's stay was extended longer than originally planned, and Adcock spent the following eight years of her childhood in England, returning to New Zealand in 1947. She later wrote about how she was reluctant to leave England.

Adcock attended Wellington Girls' College and was awarded the title of dux in 1950. She studied Classics at Victoria University of Wellington, graduating with a Bachelor of Arts in 1954 and a Masters of Arts in 1956. In 1952, at the age of 18, she married Alistair Te Ariki Campbell; they had two sons and divorced in 1958. They remained on good terms in later years. In 1962, she married Barry Crump; the marriage only lasted five months, with Adcock later saying Crump was violent towards her.

== Career ==
=== Early career, 1960–1974: academia and librarianships ===
Adcock moved to Dunedin and began her professional life in academia, after her divorce from Campbell. She also began to seriously engage with writing her own poetry. From 1958 to 1962 she worked as an assistant lecturer in classics and librarian at the University of Otago, and from 1962 to 1963 she worked as a librarian at the Alexander Turnbull Library in Wellington.

In 1963, Adcock returned permanently to England, where she worked as a librarian at the Foreign and Commonwealth Office in London until 1979. She had already had poems published in a few literary journals in New Zealand at this time. In 1963 she was one of a small number of female poets to join the Group under Edward Lucie-Smith.

Adockc's first collection of poetry, The Eye of the Hurricane, was published in New Zealand in 1964; it was written largely before she returned to England and introduces the themes of displacement and the ambivalence of belonging that recur in her work. James Bertram reviewed the collection in Landfall; he notes Adcock's "remarkable ability to isolate the occasional incident, drop her poetic pebble, and let the ripples enlarge", and concludes it "establishes its author as an accomplished writer in a number of lyrical modes". In 1967 her collection Tigers was published in the UK by Oxford University Press, including some poems from her earlier collection; she was to become known as an "Oxford poet".

Adcock's 1971 collection High Tide in the Garden marked the first time she had referenced specific New Zealand locations in her writing, through the poems "Ngauranga Gorge Hill" and "Stewart Island", and also included poems about her life in East Finchley, London, and her oldest son's return to New Zealand after visiting Adcock in England.

=== Shift to full-time writing, 1974–1990 ===
In 1975, Adcock returned briefly to New Zealand for the first time since she had left for London. In 1979 she left her librarian role at the Foreign and Commonwealth Office and became a full-time writer. She was the Arts Council Creative Writing Fellow at the Charlotte Mason College of Education in Ambleside from 1977 to 1978, followed by the Northern Arts Literary Fellowship at the universities of Newcastle and Durham from 1979 to 1981. From the late 1970s, she also worked as a poetry commentator for the BBC.

Adcock continued to be viewed as a New Zealand poet despite having left the country years before; in 1974, Alistair Paterson said that she "continues to write from a stance which is essentially that of a New Zealander", and described her as "one of our most important and prolific woman writers". Many of her poems explored her feelings about her New Zealand heritage and contrasted the sparser New Zealand landscape with English countryside. Emma Neale notes that it is fitting that a section in The Inner Harbour (1979) is titled "To and Fro", emphasising "the divided sense of identity [Adcock] inherits from both family (or historical) emigrant experience and personal expatriation". Other poems dealt with personal experiences and intimate relationships; reviewing The Scenic Route (1974), Paterson observes that she is "conscious ... of the backdrop of loss and death which is common to everybody everywhere". He identifies a sense of reservation or distance in Adcock's poetry, both thematically and from a technical perspective.

In the 1980s, Adcock broadened her literary activity beyond her own poetry and made significant contributions as a translator and editor. She produced translations of medieval Latin lyrics, published as The Virgin & the Nightingale (1983), a translation of the Romanian poet Grete Tartler (Orient Express, 1989) and edited The Oxford Book of Contemporary New Zealand Poetry (1982). Her Selected Poems was published in 1983, and won the New Zealand Book Award for Poetry at the 1984 New Zealand Book Awards. In 1987 she edited the Faber Book of Twentieth-Century Women's Poetry. In the introduction, she states that she rejects the view that "to write truly as a woman one must reject literary traditions merely because they were largely formed by men"; her concern was that women's poetry had historically been under-valued and neglected.

=== Later career, 1990–2024 ===
In the 1990s Adcock published two further collections with Oxford University Press: Time-Zones (1991) and Looking Back (1997). Reviewing Time-Zones for the New Zealand Review of Books, Janet Wilson noted the work "travels back and forth between the present and the past, England and New Zealand", and explores the death of Adcock's father in 1987. She described the work as a "sparkling volume" that "leaves one with the impression of witnessing a joyful union of fluency and elegance, inspiration and talent".

Adcock continued her editorial and translation work, co‑editing The Oxford Book of Creatures (1995) with Jacqueline Simms and translating Romanian poet Daniela Crasnaru (Letters from Darkness, 1992) and 12th-century poet Hugh Primas (Hugh Primas and the Archpoet, 1994).

Adcock's collections to date were collated into Poems: 1960–2000, published by Bloodaxe Books in 2000. In 2006 she was awarded one of Britain's top poetry awards, the Queen's Gold Medal for Poetry, for this collection. She was only the seventh female poet to receive the award in its 73 years. The New Zealand prime minister Helen Clark congratulated her on receiving the award, noting that it put Adcock "in the company of the world's greatest English-language poets".

Adcock did not write poetry for a decade after Poems: 1960–2000, saying that she had lost interest and was working instead on her family history. She returned with the publication of Dragon Talk in 2010, and subsequently published four additional collections. Fiona Sampson, reviewing Glass Wings (2013) for The Guardian, noted that Adcock's informal and immediate style of writing "has not dated in the half-century since her debut".

== Style and themes ==
Adcock's poetry is typically concerned with themes of place, human relationships and everyday activities, but frequently with a dark twist given to the mundane events she writes about. Her early work was influenced by her training as a classicist but her later work is looser in structure and more concerned with the world of the unconscious mind. The Oxford Companion to New Zealand Literature (2006) notes that her poems are often written from the perspective of an outsider or express a divided sense of identity inherited from her own emigrant experience and separation from New Zealand family.

== Death ==
Adcock died following a short illness on 10 October 2024, at the age of 90.

== Poetry collections ==
- 1964: The Eye of the Hurricane, Wellington: Reed
- 1967: Tigers, London: Oxford University Press
- 1971: High Tide in the Garden, London: Oxford University Press
- 1974: The Scenic Route, London and New York: Oxford University Press
- 1979: The Inner Harbour, Oxford and New York: Oxford University Press
- 1979: Below Loughrigg, Newcastle upon Tyne: Bloodaxe Books
- 1983: Selected Poems, Oxford and New York: Oxford University Press
- 1986: Hotspur: a ballad, Newcastle upon Tyne: Bloodaxe Books ISBN 978-1-85224-001-1
- 1986: The Incident Book, Oxford; New York: Oxford University Press
- 1988: Meeting the Comet, Newcastle upon Tyne: Bloodaxe Books
- 1991: Time-zones, Oxford and New York: Oxford University Press
- 1997: Looking Back, Oxford and Auckland: Oxford University Press
- 2000: Poems 1960–2000, Newcastle upon Tyne: Bloodaxe Books ISBN 978-1-85224-530-6
- 2010: Dragon Talk, Tarset: Bloodaxe Books ISBN 978-1-85224-878-9
- 2013: Glass Wings, Tarset: Bloodaxe Books and Wellington, NZ: Victoria University Press.
- 2014: The Land Ballot, Wellington, NZ: Victoria University Press, Tarset: Bloodaxe Books.
- 2017: Hoard, Wellington, NZ: Victoria University Press, Hexham: Bloodaxe Books.
- 2019: Collected Poems, Wellington, NZ: Victoria University Press.
- 2021: The Mermaid's Purse, Wellington, NZ: Victoria University Press, Hexham: Bloodaxe Books.
- 2024: Collected Poems, Hexham: Bloodaxe Books, Wellington, NZ: Te Herenga Waka University Press.

=== Edited or translated ===
- 1982: Editor, Oxford Book of Contemporary New Zealand Poetry, Auckland: Oxford University Press
- 1983: Translator, The Virgin and the Nightingale: Medieval Latin poems, Newcastle upon Tyne: Bloodaxe Books, ISBN 978-0-906427-55-2
- 1987: Editor, Faber Book of 20th Century Women's Poetry, London and Boston: Faber and Faber
- 1989: Translator, Orient Express: Poems, Grete Tartler, Oxford and New York: Oxford University Press
- 1992: Translator, Letters from Darkness: Poems, Daniela Crasnaru, Oxford: Oxford University Press
- 1994: Translator and editor, Hugh Primas and the Archpoet, Cambridge, England, and New York: Cambridge University Press
- 1995: Editor (with Jacqueline Simms), The Oxford Book of Creatures, verse and prose anthology, Oxford: Oxford University Press

== Awards and honours ==
- 1961: Festival of Wellington Poetry Award
- 1964: New Zealand State Literary Fund Award
- 1968: Buckland Award (New Zealand)
- 1968: Jessie Mackay Prize (New Zealand)
- 1972: Jessie Mackay Prize (New Zealand)
- 1976: Cholmondeley Award (United Kingdom)
- 1979: Buckland Award (New Zealand)
- 1984: New Zealand National Book Award for Selected Poems (1983)
- 1984: Elected Fellow of the Royal Society of Literature
- 1988: Arts Council Writers' Award (United Kingdom)
- 1996: Officer of the Order of the British Empire, for services to literature, in the 1996 New Year Honours
- 2006: Queen's Gold Medal for Poetry (United Kingdom) for Poems 1960–2000
- 2007: Honorary Doctor of Literature from Victoria University of Wellington
- 2008: Companion of the New Zealand Order of Merit, for services to literature, in the 2008 Queen's Birthday Honours
- 2010: Honorary Doctor of Literature from Goldsmiths, University of London
