= Roznov, Neamț =

Roznov
- Town
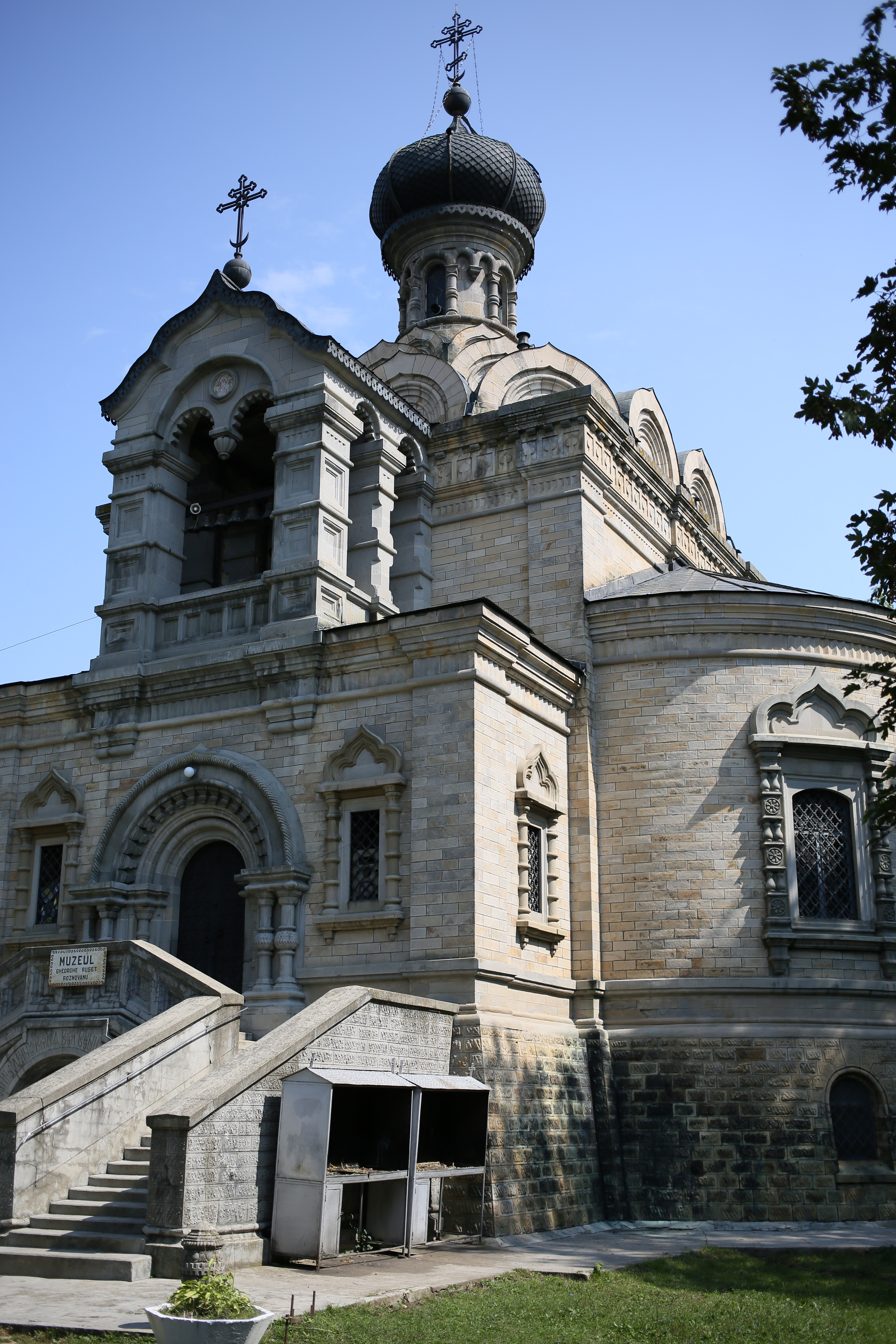
- Saint Nicholas Church

- Location in Neamț County

- Location in Romania
- Coordinates: 46°50′8″N 26°30′42″E
- Country: Romania
- County: Neamț

Government
  - Mayor (2024–2028): Vasile Pavăl (PNL)
- Area: 40.39 km^{2} (15.59 sq mi)
- Elevation: 280 m (920 ft)
- Population (2021-12-01): 8,133
  - Density: 201.4/km^{2} (521.5/sq mi)
- Time zone: UTC+02:00 (EET)
  - Summer (DST): UTC+03:00 (EEST)
- Postal code: 617390
- Area code: +(40) 0233
- Vehicle reg.: NT
- Website: www.primariaroznov.ro

Roznov is a town located in Neamț County, Western Moldavia, Romania. Roznov became a town in 2003. Two villages are administered by the town, Chintinici and Slobozia.

== Geography ==
The town is located in the central-south part of the county, 15 km (9.3 mi) southeast of the county seat, Piatra Neamț. It is situated in the northern part of the Cracău–Bistrița Depression, and lies on the banks of the river Bistrița and its tributaries, the rivers Calul and Iapa.

Roznov is crossed by national road DN15. There is also a train station, that serves the CFR Piatra Neamț – Bacău railway.

== History ==
Historical population
Year	Pop.	±%
1992	9,339	—
2002	8,726	−6.6%
2011	8,593	−1.5%
2021	8,133	−5.4%
Source: Census data

The town was first mentioned in 15th century documents, and was probably founded by German settlers, along with Târgu Neamț: historians speculate that the original name was Rosenhoff.

The main church is the Church of Saint Nicholas, situated in a dendrological park. Built between 1884 and 1892 in a Russian style unique to the region, it was founded by the boyar Gheorghe Ruset Roznovanu, whose family had an estate at Roznov for many years. The interior frescoes were completed in 1915 by the artist Costin Petrescu, under the aegis of banker, oil magnate, vineyard owner, and art collector Hector Economos, who bought the Roznov estate after the Ruset Roznovanu family died out. Today the church is an important historical monument. Also situated on the 3 hectares (7.4 acres) of the park is Roznovanu Castle, now in poor condition.

== Economy ==
The main economy of Roznov consists of the production of adhesives, chemicals used on agriculture, and sulphuric acid.

== Natives ==
- Grigore Cugler (1903–1972), short story writer, poet, and humorist
- Mădălin Hodor (born 1977), historian
- Gheorghe Rosnovanu (1834–1904), soldier and politician

== Notes ==
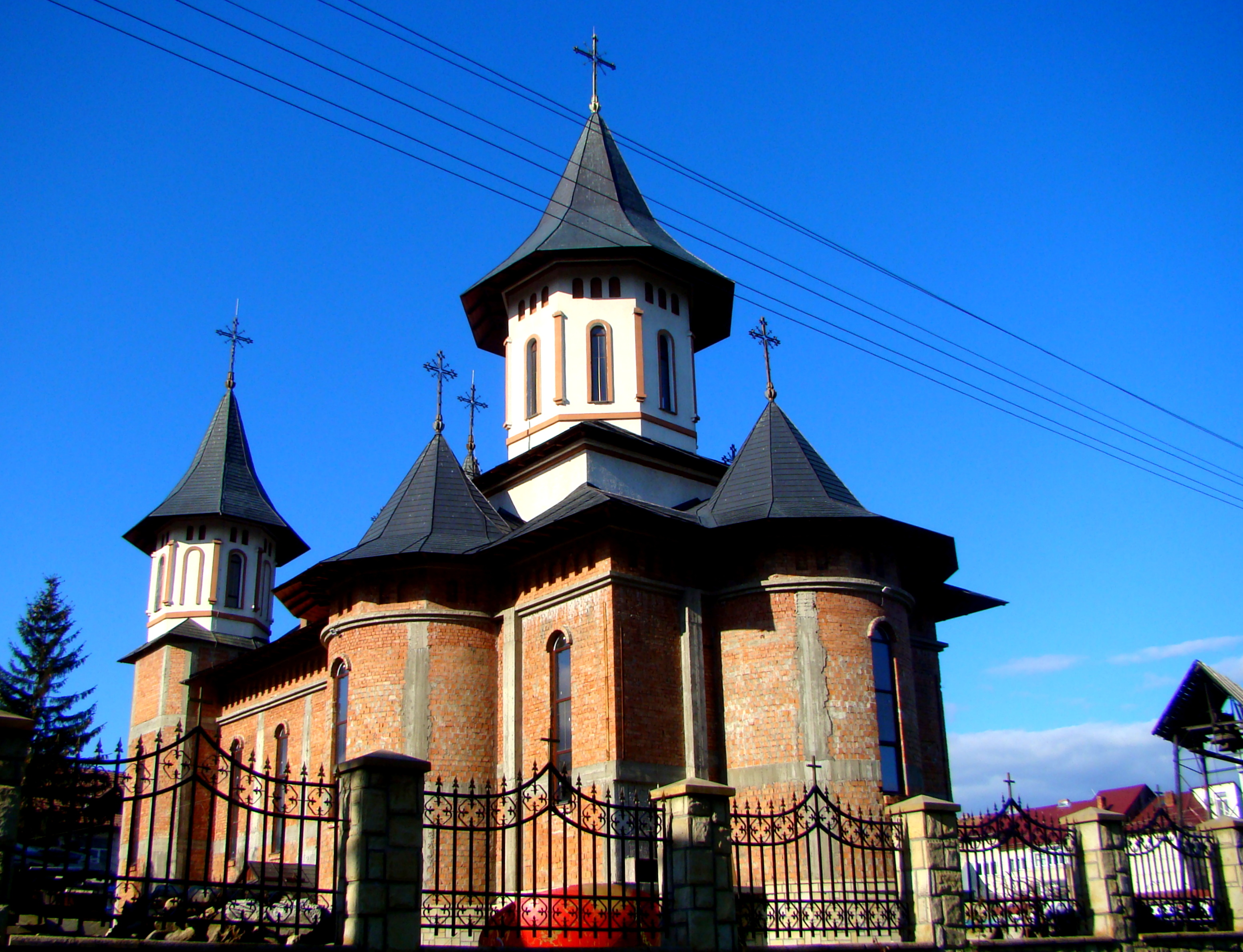
Church of the Holy Apostles

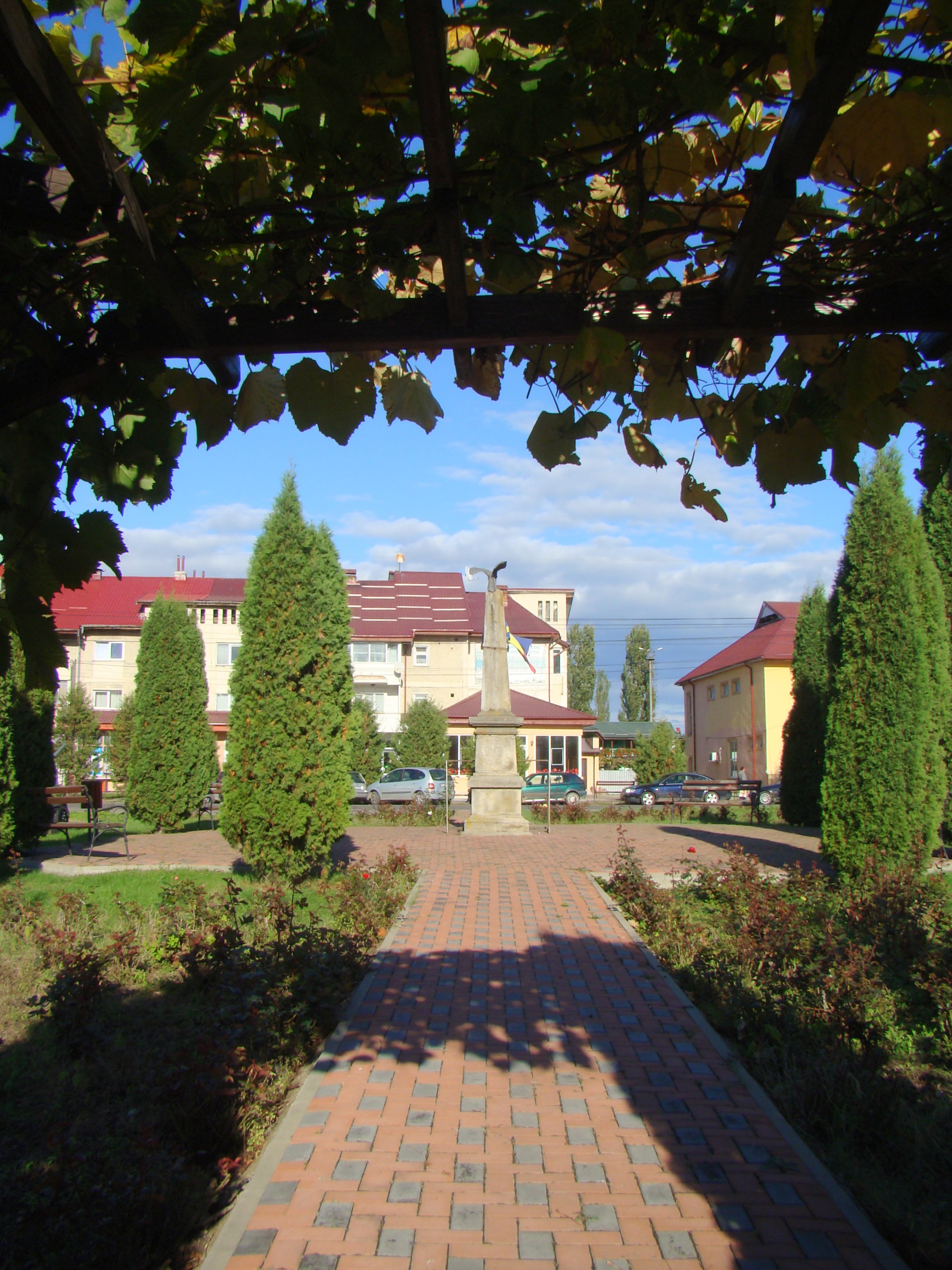
Heroes’ monument
