= Clément Magloire-Saint-Aude =

Haitian symbolist-surrealist poet

- Born: Clément Magloire; April 2, 1912; Port-au-Prince, Haiti
- Died: May 27, 1971 (aged 59)
- Occupation: Surrealist-Symbolist poet

Clément Magloire-Saint-Aude (April 2, 1912 – May 27, 1971) was a Haitian surrealist-symbolist poet and writer.

== Biography ==
He was born in Port-au-Prince, Haiti, on April 2, 1912. His father was the director of the prominent literary newspaper Le Matin. In adulthood, Clément adopted the name Magloire-Saint-Aude after a combination of his birth name and his mother's maiden name. As a writer, Magloire-Saint-Aude became interested in Surrealism, and with his creation of the Haitian journal Les Griots (see griot, a West African storyteller) in 1937, eventually meeting surrealists such as Aimé Césaire, as well as André Breton, on his visits to Haiti during the Second World War. Magloire met Breton in accompaniment with Pierre Mabille (the then cultural adviser to the French Embassy) and Wifredo Lam. Upon this meeting, Breton, enamored with his work, got it published in a collection in the literary section of Le Figaro.

As an isolated poet, Magloire-Saint-Aude had a radical advocacy of social and political justice for blacks. He encountered difficulties in his politics with fellow Haitians and other members of the Francophone writing community in his thoughts on the concept of negritude (commonly propounded by the philosopher Frantz Fanon). He was part of a general cultural revival in the mid-20th century throughout the Caribbean which, fused with the Francophone-linked world of Surrealism, explored colonialism, history, voodoo, and colonized identities. When Breton visited for a lecture tour, Magloire-Saint-Aude struck a chord in the wider Surrealist community when the "rogue poet" "read [him] back Breton's own definition of surrealism."

Magloire-Saint-Aude died of cirrhosis of the liver in 1972.

== Writing ==
Clément Magloire-Saint-Aude's work is known for his cutting, "fragrant" lines. His works, such as Dialogue de mes lampes (1941), Tabou (1941) and Déchu (1956), characterize his syntheses of Symbolist and Surrealist experimenting.

The poet Christophe Charles wrote that "the hermetic, obscure, secret verses" of some of his most notable writing does not rely on understanding, but feeling and the message of "independence, refusal, and renunciation." He also wrote prose, and was connected to and corresponded with the international surrealist community.

== Legacy ==
Dany Laferrière quotes him frequently in his novel Dining with the Dictator. In his book, Laferrière considers Magloire the best poet of the Americas, while expressing some reservation about his relationship to Duvalier and how it squares with Laferrière's own political exile from the Haitian dictator's regime. Laferrière's "Other" argues that Magloire's Le manifeste de griots is the "Caribbean equivalent of Hitler's Mein kampf", but that his poetry cancelled out and transcended his political position and offered a powerful counterpoint to a repressive Haiti, as illustrated with the numerous epigraphs used in the book.

== Published works ==
- Dialogue de mes lampes (Dialogue of My Lamps) (1941)
- Tabou (Taboo) (1941)
- Parias (Pariahs) (1949)
- Ombres et Reflets (Shadows and Reflections) (1952)
- Veillée (Evening) (1956)
- Déchu (Fallen) (1956)
