= Thomas Chignell =

English cricketer and dentist

Personal information
- Full name: Thomas Alexander Chignell
- Born: 31 October 1880; Havant, Hampshire, England
- Died: 25 August 1965 (aged 84); Portsmouth, Hampshire, England
- Batting: Left-handed
- Bowling: Right-arm slow-medium

Domestic team information
- Years: Team
- 1901–1904: Hampshire

Career statistics
Competition	First-class
Matches	18
Runs scored	181
Batting average	10.05
100s/50s	–/–
Top score	29*
Balls bowled	1,858
Wickets	33
Bowling average	33.57
5 wickets in innings	1
10 wickets in match	–
Best bowling	5/68
Catches/stumpings	11/–
- Source: Cricinfo, 18 January 2010

Thomas Alexander Chignell (31 October 1880 — 25 August 1965) was an English first-class cricketer and dentist.

Chignell was born at Havant in October 1880. A club cricketer for Havant Cricket Club, who he also assisted for many years, Chignell made his debut in first-class cricket for Hampshire against Kent at Tonbridge in the 1901 County Championship. He played first-class cricket occasionally for Hampshire until 1904, making eighteen appearances. Described by Wisden as a "slow bowler" who "played some useful innings", he scored 181 runs in his eighteen matches, at an average of 10.05 and with a highest score of 29 not out. With the ball, he took 33 wickets at a bowling average of 33.57; he took one five wicket haul, with figures of 5 for 68 against Derbyshire in 1903. Outside of cricket, Chignell was a dentist. He ran a dental practice in Emsworth. Chignell died at the Royal Portsmouth Hospital in August 1965.
