= Charlie Chignell =

South Africa international rugby union footballer

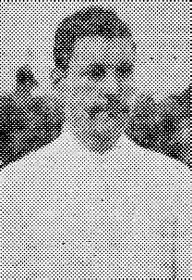
- Born: Thomas William Chignell; 28 April 1866 Heavitree, England
- Died: 17 November 1952 (aged 86) Cape Town, South Africa

Rugby union career
- Position: Forward
Provincial / State sides
Years	Team	Apps	(Points)
- Western Province
- Correct as of 19 July 2010
International career
Years	Team	Apps	(Points)
1891	South Africa	1	(0)
- Correct as of 19 July 2010

Thomas William "Charlie" Chignell (28 April 1866 – 17 November 1952) was an England-born South African international rugby union player, he played provincial rugby for Western Province. Chignell made his only appearance for South Africa during Great Britain's 1891 tour, South Africa's first as a Test nation. He played as a forward in the 3rd Test of the three match series, at the Newlands Stadium, Cape Town, Great Britain won the game 4–0. Chignell died in 1952, in Cape Town, at the age of 86.
