= Robin Behn =

American poet

Robin Behn (born 1958) is an American poet, and professor at University of Alabama and Vermont College of Fine Arts.

She grew up in Barrington, Illinois. She graduated from Oberlin College, the University of Missouri, and University of Iowa. Her work has appeared in Cortland Review, Perihelion, Poetry, and Kenyon Review.

== Awards ==
- 1999 Guggenheim Fellowship
- National Endowment for the Arts Fellowship

== Works ==
- Paper Bird. Texas Tech University Press. 1988. ISBN 978-0-89672-164-7. "robin behn."
- The Red Hour, HarperCollins, 1993, ISBN 978-0-06-096952-3
- Horizon Note. University of Wisconsin Press. 2001. ISBN 978-0-299-17534-4.
- Naked Writing, DoubleCross Press, 2008
- The Yellow House, Spuyten Duyvil, 2010, ISBN 978-1-933132-76-1

=== Editor ===
- The Practice of Poetry: Writing Exercises from Poets Who Teach. HarperCollins. 1992. ISBN 978-0-06-273024-4. "robin behn."
- Once Upon a Time in the Twenty-First Century: Unexpected Exercises in Creative Writing. University of Alabama Press. 2020. ISBN 978-0817359423.
