= Sándor Tóth =

Hungarian journalist and politician (1939–2019)

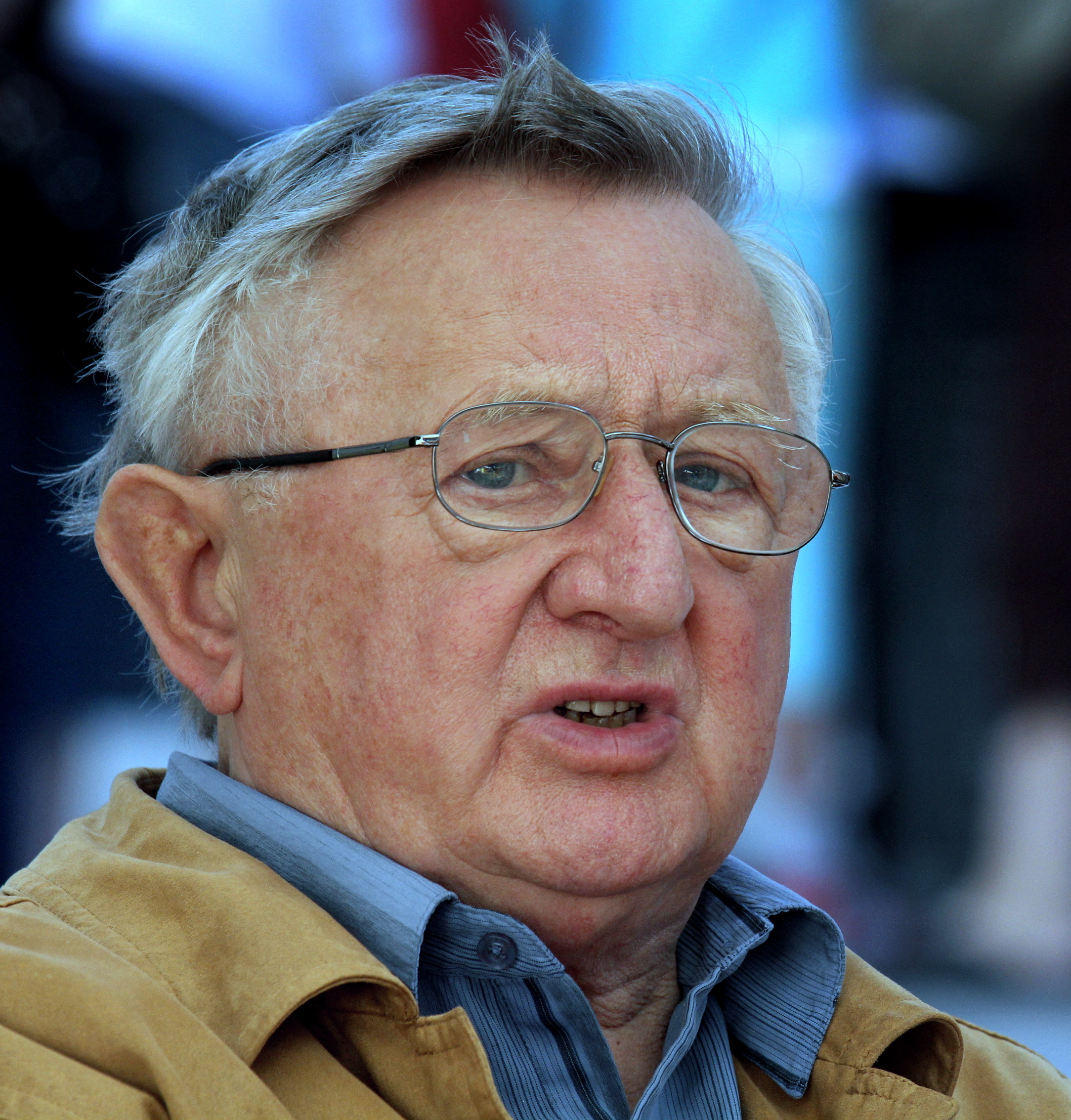

Member of the National Assembly
- In office 2 May 1990 – 27 June 1994

Personal details
- Born: 18 August 1939 Szolnok, Hungary
- Died: 11 September 2019 (aged 80) Budapest, Hungary
- Party: KDNP
- Profession: poet, journalist, politician

Sándor Tóth (18 August 1939 – 11 September 2019) was a Hungarian poet and journalist, who edited Vigilia and Magyar Katolikus Rádió. He was a member of the Christian Democratic People's Party (KDNP). He was a Member of Parliament (MP) for Pásztó (Nógrád County Constituency II) between 1990 and 1994. In this capacity he worked in the Committee on Culture, Science, Higher Education, Television, Radio and the Press. He also served as one of the recorders of the National Assembly.

For his literal works, he was awarded the Attila József Prize in 1995. He lectured at the Vitéz János Faculty of Teaching of the Pázmány Péter Catholic University.

== Works ==
- Belül ragyoghatsz (poems, 1992)
- Kövek és pillangók (poems, 1994)
- Arckép és vallomás (prose and lyrical selection, 1994)
- A keresztnevek eredete (1998)
- Kupola-jegyzetek (1998)
- Adagio (poems, 1999)
- Isten ritmusa (essays, 2001)
- Csillagárnyék (poems, 2008)
- Följegyzések a hegyen (publications, articles, 2014)
- Táj és lélek. Barangolások könyve. A Magyar Katolikus Rádió hangfelvételei alapján, 2004-2015; Üveghegy, Százhalombatta, 2015 + DVD
- Fény- és lombhullámok. Kisprózák, arcok, művek; Szt. István Társulat, Bp., 2016
