= Javier Sologuren =

Peruvian writer (1921–2004)

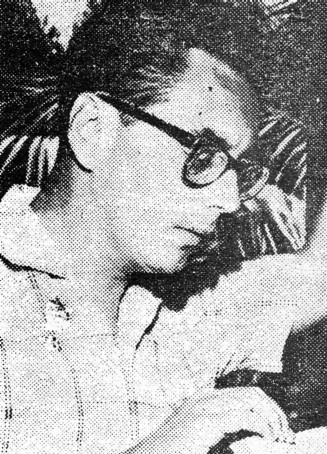
Javier Sologuren

Javier Sologuren Moreno (Lima, 19 January 1921 – 21 May 2004) was a Peruvian writer and poet.

== Biography ==
Javier Sologuren received a doctoral degree in Hispanic literature at the National University of San Marcos and also made postdegree studies at the Colegio de México and the University of Leuven, Belgium. Between 1951 and 1957 he became a teacher at the University of Lund, Sweden, where he was also a Spanish language lecturer and where he married. Back in Peru he was a professor at the universities of San Marcos, Universidad Nacional Agraria La Molina and Enrique Guzmán y Valle "La Cantuta" in Lima.

Sologuren was also editor/printer of Ediciones de la Rama Florida, which published 145 titles of Peruvian and foreign poetry between 1959 and 1972 (he made the visual design and the printing himself). Many young poets premiered their works in this editions, among them Luis Hernández, Antonio Cisneros, Javier Heraud.

In the 1970s he was director of Creación & Crítica magazine, together with poets Armando Rojas and Ricardo Silva-Santisteban. In the 1980s he was director of Cielo Abierto cultural magazine.

Sologuren and Jorge Eduardo Eielson were the main representatives of the poetic branch of movement generación del 50 in Peru.

== Works ==
Sologuren aims for a pure poetics that transcends everyday life, using diverse images and elaborated thoughts. He collected all his poetic production in the book Vida continua, that he re-edited several times during his life. He is also important as a translator of Chinese and Japanese classical literature into Spanish.

- El morador (1944)
- Detenimientos (1947)
- Dédalo dormido (1949)
- Bajo los ojos del amor (1950)
- Otoño, endechas (1959)
- Estancias (1960)
- La gruta de la sirena (1961)
- Vida continua (1966, 1971)
- Recinto (1967)
- Surcando el aire oscuro (1970)
- Corola parva (1977)
- Folios del Enamorado y la Muerte (1980)
- Jaikus escritos en un amanecer de otoño (1986)
- Retornelo (1986)
- Catorce versos dicen (1987)
- Folios de El Enamorado y la Muerte & El amor y los cuerpos (1988)
- Poemas 1988 (1988)
- Vida Continua. Obra poética (1939–1989) (1989)
- Un trino en la ventana vacía (1992, 1993)
- Hojas del herbolario (1995).

== Awards ==
- Premio Nacional de Poesía (1960)
- Premio "Rafael Heliodoro Valle" (México, 1983)
- Premio "Pérez Bonalde" (Venezuela, 1995)
- Premio SUNAT "Miguel de Cervantes, recaudador de impuestos" (Lima, 2001)
