= Aldo Pellegrini (poet) =

Argentine poet, essayist, and art critic

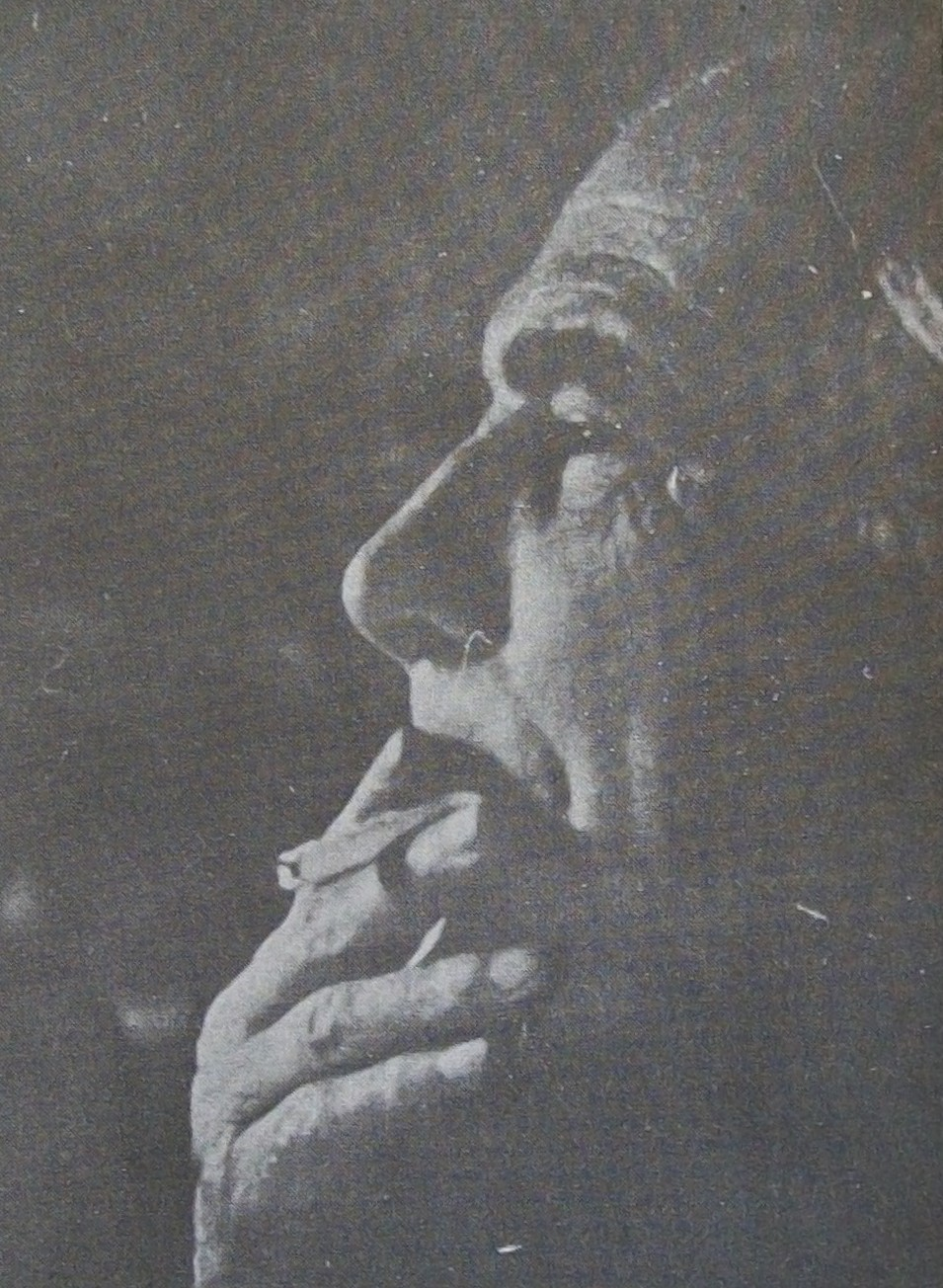

Aldo Mario Pellegrini (Rosario, Santa Fe 1903–1973), was an Argentine poet, essayist and art critic.

Two years after the publication of the Surrealist Manifesto by André Breton in 1924, Pellegrini, along with Marino Cassano, Elias Piterbarg, and David Sussmann, founded the first surrealist group in South America in his native Argentina. In 1928

== Works ==
=== Poetry ===
- (1949). El muro secreto. Buenos Aires: Argonauta.
- (1952). La valija de fuego. Buenos Aires: Américalee.
- (1957). Construcción de la destrucción. Buenos Aires: A Partir de Cero.
- (1966). Distribución del silencio. Buenos Aires: Argonauta.
- (2001) La valija de fuego (poesía completa). Buenos Aires: Argonauta.

=== Theatre ===
- (1964). Teatro de la inestable realidad. Buenos Aires: El Carro de Tespis.

=== Essays ===
- (1965). Para contribuir a la confusión general. Buenos Aires: Nueva Visión.

=== Painting ===
- (1956) Artistas abstractos argentinos. París/Buenos Aires: Cercle d'art.
- (1967) Panorama de la pintura argentina contemporánea. Buenos Aires: Paidós.
- (1967) Nuevas tendencias en la pintura. Buenos Aires: Muchnik.
