= Wheaton College =

Wheaton College may refer to:

- Wheaton College (Illinois), a private Christian, coeducational, liberal arts college in Wheaton, Illinois
- Wheaton College (Massachusetts), a private secular, coeducational, liberal arts college in Norton, Massachusetts
