= Daniela Crăsnaru =

Romanian poet (born 1950)

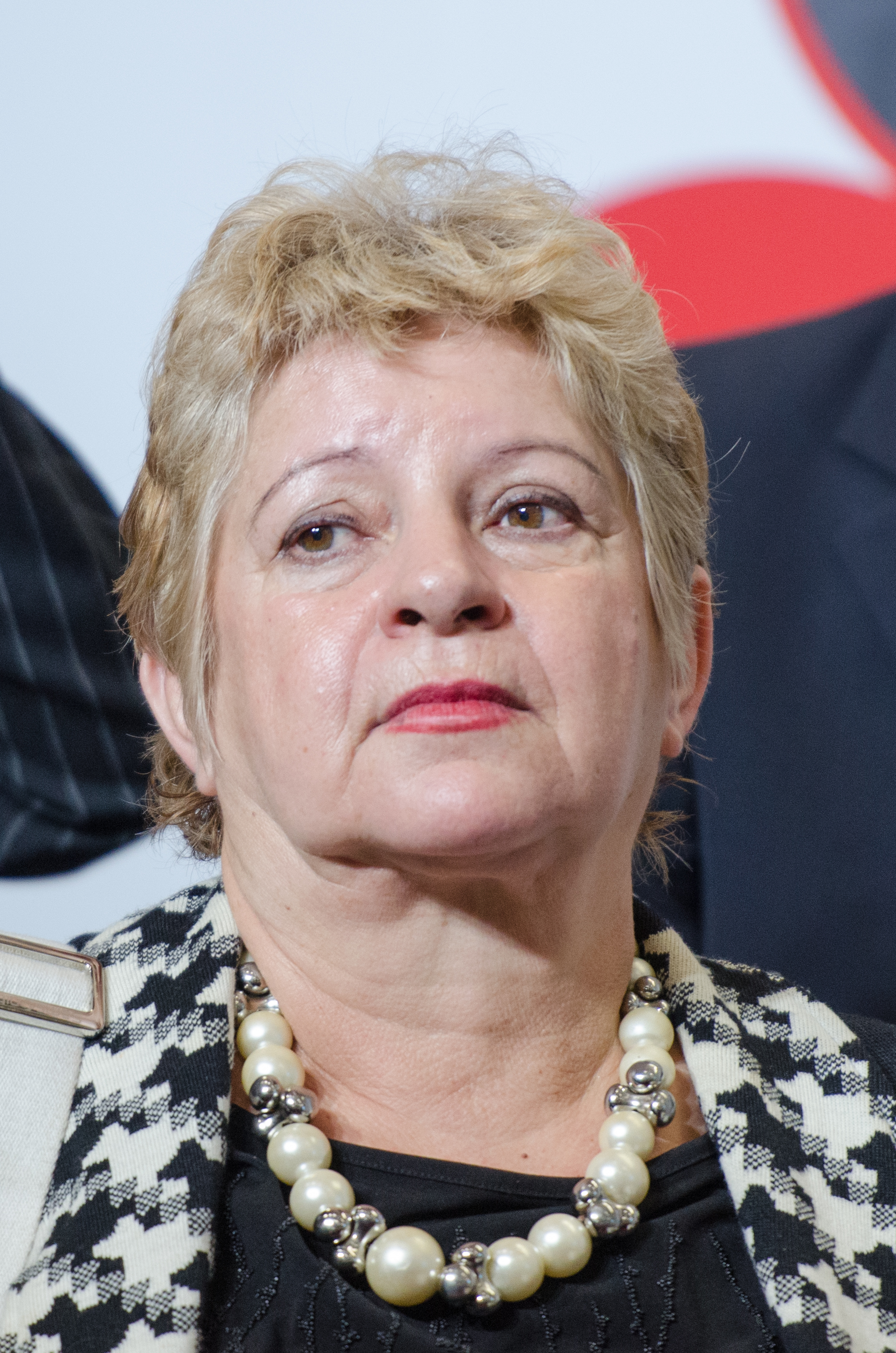
Daniela Crăsnaru, Gothenburg, 2013

Daniela-Carmen Crăsnaru (born 14 April 1950) is a Romanian poet whose works have been widely translated. She has also written short stories and works for children. From 1990 to 1992, Crăsnaru was a deputy in the Romanian parliament, representing the National Salvation Front (FSN).

Crăsnaru has authored poetry, short stories and children's books. One of the most important contemporary poets in Romania, she has received international acclaim as a result of the translation of her poetry into at least 15 languages. In 1991, she received the Lifetime Achievement Award of the Romanian Academy where she is now deputy director.

Under the Ceaușescu regime, Crăsnaru was limited by the political oppression of the period but her unlike many Eastern European authors, her short stories extend beyond politics to enlarge on the weaknesses of ordinary people who experience helplessness and failure. The poems in her Letters from Darkness reveal the contrast between the work she published in the Ceaușescu period with the subversive poetry she hid until the 1989 revolution.

== Works ==
The following are translations of Crăsnaru's works in English:

- Crăsnaru, Daniela; Adcock, Fleur (1991). Letters from darkness: poems. Oxford University Press. ISBN 978-0-19-282883-5.
- Crăsnaru, Daniela (2004). The Grand Prize and Other Stories. Northwestern University Press. ISBN 978-0-8101-1849-2.
- Crăsnaru, Daniela (1999). Sea-level Zero. BOA Editions, Ltd. ISBN 978-1-880238-79-0.
