= List of Romanians =

This is a list of some of the most prominent Romanians. It contains historical and important contemporary figures (athletes, actors, directors etc.).

Most of the people listed here are of Romanian ethnicity, whose native tongue is Romanian. There are also a few mentioned who were born in Romania and can speak Romanian, though not of Romanian ethnicity.

== Historical and political figures ==
=== Medieval ===
- Alexander I the Good (1375–1432), Domn of Moldavia (1400–1432)
- Peter Aaron
- Basarab I the Founder (1270–1352), first independent Domn of Wallachia (1310–1352)
- Michael the Brave (1558–1601), Domn of Wallachia (1593–1601), Domn of Moldavia (1600) and de facto ruler of Transylvania (1599–1600)
- Mircea I the Elder (1355–1418), Domn of Wallachia (1386–1394, 1397–1418)
- Neagoe Basarab V (1459–1521), Domn of Wallachia (1512–1521)
- Nicolaus Olahus (1493–1568), Roman Catholic Archbishop of the Kingdom of Hungary
- Stephen III the Great (1433–1504), Domn of Moldavia (1457–1504)
- Vlad II Dracul (before 1395–1447), Domn of Wallachia (1436–1442, 1443–1447)
- Vlad III the Impaler (1431–1477), Domn of Wallachia (1448, 1456–1462, 1476–1477)

=== Renaissance Age ===
- Dimitrie Cantemir, ruler of Moldavia, historian, writer, and music composer
- Antioch Kantemir, poet and Russian ambassador
- Constantin Brancoveanu, Prince of Wallachia (1688–1714)

=== Modern era ===
- Tudor Vladimirescu
- Prince Gheorghe Bibescu
- Prince Barbu Dimitrie Știrbei
- Prince Alexandru Ioan Cuza
- King Carol I of Romania
- King Ferdinand I of Romania
- King Carol II of Romania
- King Michael I of Romania
- Queen Elizabeth of Romania
- Queen Marie of Romania

=== Politicians and militarymen ===
- Ion Antonescu, Prime Minister and Conducător (Leader) during World War II
- Alexandru Averescu, general and politician
- Nicolae Bălcescu, historian, revolutionary
- Antoine Bibesco, diplomat, writer
- Gheorghe Grigore Cantacuzino, Prime Minister during the 1907 Romanian Peasants' revolt
- Lascăr Catargiu
- Corneliu Codreanu, founder and charismatic leader of the Iron Guard
- Constantin Cristescu, general, Chief of Staff
- Barbu Ștefănescu Delavrancea, former mayor of Bucharest
- Ion Dragalina, general
- Petre Dumitrescu, general
- Octavian Goga, writer, former Prime Minister
- Avram Iancu, revolutionary in 1848 Revolution
- Take Ionescu, Prime Minister in interbellum Romania
- Mugur Isărescu, economist and member of the Club of Rome, former Prime Minister
- Mihail Lascăr, World War II general, Minister of Defense
- Mihail Manoilescu, economist and Foreign Minister
- Alexandru Marghiloman, Prime Minister during World War I
- Gheorghe G. Mironescu, Prime Minister in interbellum Romania
- Ion Mihai Pacepa
- David Praporgescu, general
- Constantin Prezan, general in World War I, Marshal of Romania
- Nicolae Rădescu, Prime Minister during World War II
- Radu R. Rosetti, general
- Ecaterina Teodoroiu, soldier and heroine during World War I

==== National Peasants' Party ====
- Emil Constantinescu, former President of Romania
- Corneliu Coposu, politician, National Peasants' Party
- Doina Cornea, noted dissident and intellectual, National Peasants' Party
- Iuliu Maniu, politician, one of the creators of the National Peasants' Party
- Ion Mihalache, politician, National Peasants' Party
- Ion Rațiu, politician, National Peasants' Party
- Alexandru Vaida-Voevod, politician, Prime Minister of Romania, National Peasants' Party
- Radu Vasile, economist and politician, former Prime Minister

==== National Liberal Party (1875–1950) ====
- Dinu Brătianu, president of the National Liberal Party, arrested and imprisoned without trial by the communists, dying in 1950, probably at Sighet Prison
- Ion C. Brătianu, Prime Minister of Romania
- Ion I. C. Brătianu, politician, one of the founders of the Liberal movement in Romania, Prime Minister, son of Ion C. Brătianu
- Vintilă Brătianu, politician, Prime Minister of Romania, son of Ion C. Brătianu
- Ion G. Duca, Prime Minister, assassinated by Iron Guard
- Ion Ghica, mathematician, diplomat, Prime Minister
- Mihail Kogălniceanu, lawyer, historian, publicist, Prime Minister, Minister of Foreign Affairs, Minister of Internal Affairs
- C. A. Rosetti, publicist, Mayor of Bucharest
- Dimitrie Sturdza, president of the National Liberal Party and president of the Romanian Academy

==== National Liberal Party (after 1990) ====
- Crin Antonescu, former leader of the party (2009–2014)
- Radu Câmpeanu, first leader of the party after the 1989 revolution
- Neagu Djuvara, former historian
- Eduard Hellvig, former director of the Romanian Intelligence Service
- Klaus Iohannis, former President of Romania (2014-2025), former leader of the party (2014)
- Mircea Ionescu-Quintus, leader of the party (1993–2001)
- Nicolae Manolescu, literary critic
- Siegfried Mureșan, MEP and current spokesman of the European People's Party (EPP)
- Călin Popescu-Tăriceanu, former Prime Minister, former leader of the party (2004–2009)
- Cătălin Predoiu, lawyer, former Justice Minister
- Theodor Stolojan, former Prime Minister, leader of the party (2002–2004)
- Mihai Răzvan Ungureanu, former Minister of Foreign Affairs (2004–2007), former head of Romanian Foreign Intelligence Service (2007–2012)
- Renate Weber, former lawyer, former MEP, currently Romanian Ombudsman

==== Romanian Communist Party ====
- Gheorghe Apostol, General Secretary
- Alexandru Bârlădeanu, Marxian economist and statesman
- Emil Bobu
- Emil Bodnăraș
- Silviu Brucan
- Elena Ceaușescu, wife of Nicolae Ceaușescu
- Nicolae Ceaușescu, General Secretary
- Miron Constantinescu
- Gheorghe Gheorghiu-Dej, General Secretary and Prime Minister
- Petru Groza, Prime Minister
- Corneliu Mănescu
- Manea Mănescu, Prime Minister
- Ion Gheorghe Maurer, Prime Minister
- Paul Niculescu-Mizil
- Ana Pauker
- Constantin Pîrvulescu
- Leonte Răutu
- Vladimir Tismăneanu
- Ana Toma

==== Democratic Liberal Party ====
- Teodor Baconschi, former Foreign Affairs Minister
- Traian Băsescu, former President of Romania and president of the Democratic Liberal Party
- Emil Boc, former Prime Minister and president of the Democratic Liberal Party
- Vasile Blaga, former Internal Affairs Minister and president of the Democratic Liberal Party
- Daniel Funeriu, former Education Minister
- Monica Macovei, former Justice Minister
- Theodor Paleologu, former Culture Minister

==== Social Democratic Party ====
- Ana Birchall, current Justice Minister
- Titus Corlățean, former Foreign Affairs Minister
- Cristian Diaconescu, former Foreign Affairs Minister
- Mircea Geoană, former Foreign Minister, former president of the Social Democratic Party and current deputy secretary general of NATO
- Ion Iliescu, former President of Romania, former president of the Social Democratic Party
- Adrian Năstase, former Prime Minister, former president of the Social Democratic Party
- Victor Ponta, former Prime Minister, former president of the Social Democratic Party

=== Diplomats ===
- Bogdan Aurescu, judge of the International Court of Justice
- Antoine Bibesco
- Adrian Cioroianu, historian
- Eugen Filotti
- Grigore Gafencu
- Constantin Karadja
- Corneliu Mănescu
- Teodor Meleșcanu
- Alexandru Paleologu, essayist and literary critic
- Vasile Pușcaș, historian
- Savel Rădulescu
- Nicolae Titulescu, professor of law and former President of the General Assembly of the League of Nations (1930–32)
- Constantin Vișoianu

== Arts ==
=== Dance ===
- Iris Barbura, dancer and choreographer
- Alina Cojocaru, ballerina
- Eugenia Popescu-Județ, ballerina, dance teacher, choreographer, manuscript specialist

=== Fashion ===
- Ioana Ciolacu, awarded fashion designer
- Maria Lucia Hohan
- Narcisa Pheres

=== Photography ===
- Costică Acsinte
- Iosif Berman
- Alexandra Croitoru
- Samoilă Mârza

=== Sculpture ===
- Constantin Brâncuși
- Oscar Han
- Ion Irimescu
- Ion Jalea
- Ana Lupaș
- Cornel Medrea
- Paul Neagu
- Mihai Olos
- Dimitrie Paciurea
- Dumitru Pasima
- Milița Petrașcu
- Marilena Preda-Sânc
- Frederic Storck
- Marian Zidaru

=== Writing ===
- Vasile Alecsandri, poet and playwright
- Lucian Blaga, philosopher, poet, playwright
- Ion Luca Caragiale
- Andrei Codrescu, poet and essayist
- Nichita Danilov, poet, essayist, novelist
- Nae Ionescu, philosopher, writer, logician
- Virgil Nemoianu, essayist, literary critic, philosopher of culture
- Horia-Roman Patapievici, writer, philosopher, essayist
- Bogdan Petriceicu-Hasdeu, philologist, linguist
- Ion Pillat, poet, publicist, academic
- Andrei Pleșu, writer, philosopher, essayist, journalist
- Dumitru Radu Popescu, novelist, essayist, playwright
- Marin Sorescu, poet, playwright
- Nichita Stănescu, poet and playwright
- Petre Țuțea
- Vasile Voiculescu, poet, writer, playwright

==== Philosophers ====
- Petre Andrei, philosopher
- Lucian Blaga, philosopher, poet, playwright
- Emil Cioran, essayist, philosopher
- Vasile Conta, philosopher
- Mircea Eliade, philosopher
- Mircea Florian, philosopher
- Nae Ionescu, orthodox philosopher
- Stéphane Lupasco, philosopher
- Constantin Noica, philosopher
- Theodor Paleologu, politician, philosopher
- Camil Petrescu, essayist, philosopher, writer
- Dumitru D. Roșca, philosopher, professor
- Petre Țuțea, philosopher
- Tudor Vianu, philosopher of culture, critic, writer

==== Poets ====
- Vasile Alecsandri, playwright, poet and revolutionary
- Grigore Alexandrescu, poet
- Ioan Alexandru, poet and political figure
- Bartolomeu Anania, poet and clerical figure
- Dimitrie Anghel, poet and playwright
- Tudor Arghezi, poet, journalist
- Céline Arnauld, poet (French language)
- Anatol E. Baconsky, poet
- George Bacovia, poet
- Vasile Baghiu, novelist and poet
- Cezar Baltag, poet and essayist
- Ion Barbu, poet and mathematician
- Mihai Beniuc, poet and Communist Party figure
- Lucian Blaga, poet, philosopher, playwright, translator
- Ana Blandiana, poet, journalist
- Eta Boeriu, poet, literary critic, translator
- Geo Bogza, poet, journalist
- Dimitrie Bolintineanu, novelist, poet, and revolutionary
- Cezar Bolliac, poet and revolutionary
- Emil Botta, actor, poet
- Emil Brumaru, poet
- Scarlat Cantacuzino, poet, essayist and diplomat
- Ion Caraion, poet
- Vasile Cârlova, poet
- Magda Cârneci, poet, art critic and historian
- Mircea Cărtărescu, poet, essayist
- Nina Cassian, poet, translator (+English language)
- Paul Celan, poet (German language)
- George Coșbuc, poet, translator
- Traian T. Coșovei, poet
- Aron Cotruș, poet
- Nichifor Crainic, essayist, poet, journalist, theologian, and political figure
- Nichita Danilov, poet
- Leonid Dimov, poet
- Mircea Dinescu, poet, journalist
- Ștefan Augustin Doinaș, poet, translator and political figure
- Geo Dumitrescu, poet
- Mihai Eminescu, poet, essayist, journalist
- Șerban Foarță, poet, essayist, translator
- Benjamin Fondane, poet, essayist (+French language)
- Emilian Galaicu-Păun, poet, essayist and novelist
- Dumitru Găleșanu, poet-philosopher, essayist and book illustrator
- Octavian Goga, poet and political figure
- Radu Gyr, poet
- Iulia Hasdeu, poet
- Ion Heliade-Rădulescu, poet and revolutionary
- Ștefan Octavian Iosif, poet, translator
- Isidore Isou, poet
- Nora Iuga, poet
- Mircea Ivănescu, poet and translator
- Eugen Jebeleanu, poet
- Claudiu Komartin, poet and translator
- Nicolae Labiș, poet
- Leonida Lari, poet and political figure
- Irving Layton, poet
- Gherasim Luca, poet
- Alexandru Macedonski, poet
- Adrian Maniu, poet
- Angela Marinescu, poet
- Dumitru Matcovschi, poet
- Virgil Mazilescu, poet
- Ion Minulescu, poet and novelist
- Andrei Mureșanu, poet and revolutionary
- Alexandru Mușina, poet, essayist and translator
- Gellu Naum, poet, playwright and translator
- Sașa Pană, poet
- Oskar Pastior, poet (German language)
- Adrian Păunescu, poet and political figure
- Cristian Popescu, poet
- Marin Sorescu, poet and novelist
- Radu Stanca, director, playwright, poet and essayist
- Nichita Stănescu, poet, essayist, translator
- Valeriu Sterian, singer-songwriter
- Constant Tonegaru, poet
- George Topîrceanu, poet
- Tristan Tzara, poet (+French language)
- Grigore Vieru, poet
- Ion Vinea, poet
- Matei Vișniec, playwright and poet (+French language)
- Gelu Vlașin, poet
- Vasile Voiculescu, poet
- Ilarie Voronca, poet (+French language)

==== Writers ====
- Gabriela Adameșteanu
- Radu Aldulescu
- George Bălăiță
- Eugen Barbu
- Marthe Bibesco, writer (+French language)
- Nicolae Breban
- Augustin Buzura
- Ion Luca Caragiale, playwright
- Mateiu Caragiale, novelist
- Mircea Cărtărescu, writer, essayist
- Nina Cassian (pen name of Renée Annie Cassian-Mătăsaru; 1924–2014), poet, children's book writer, translator, journalist, and film critic
- Paul Celan (born Paul Antschel; 1920–1970), Romanian-born French poet, Holocaust survivor, and literary translator
- Pavel Chihaia
- George Coandă, writer, historian, novelist and poet
- Ioan Mihai Cochinescu, writer, essayist
- Andrei Codrescu (born 1946), Romanian-born American poet, novelist, essayist, and screenwriter
- Gheorghe Crăciun
- Ion Creangă, writer, especially of children's stories
- Ioan Petru Culianu, historian of religion
- Sergiu Dan (born Isidor Rotman; 1903–1976), novelist, journalist, Holocaust survivor, and political prisoner of the communist regime.
- Petru Dumitriu
- Mircea Eliade, historian of religion; also novelist
- Mihail Fărcășanu, writer, novelist
- Nicolae Filimon
- Filip Florian
- Benjamin Fondane (born Benjamin Wechsle; 1898–1944), Romanian and French poet, critic, and existentialist philosopher
- Virgil Gheorghiu, novelist
- Paul Goma, writer
- Anton Holban
- Vintilă Horia, prominent writer (+French language)
- Eugène Ionesco, Romanian-French playwright (+French language)
- Isidore Isou (born Isidor Goldstein; 1925–2007), Romanian-born French poet and novelist
- Petre Ispirescu, writer
- Panait Istrati, novelist (+French language)
- Claudiu Komartin
- Irving Layton, (born Israel Pincu Lazarovitch; 1912–2006), Romanian-born Canadian poet
- Gabriel Liiceanu, writer, publi
- Gherasim Luca (1913–1994), surrealist theorist and poet
- Norman Manea (born 1936), writer and author of short fiction, novels, and essays
- Nicolae Milescu, writer, diplomat
- Herta Müller, Romanian-German writer (German language), 2009 Nobel Prize in Literature
- Mircea Nedelciu
- Bujor Nedelcovici, Romanian-French writer
- Hortensia Papadat-Bengescu
- Paul Păun (1915–1994), born Zaharia Herșcovici), Romanian-Israeli avant-garde poet
- Camil Petrescu
- Cezar Petrescu
- Vasile Pogor, writer
- Marin Preda, novelist
- Eugen D. Relgis (backward reading of Eisig D. Sigler; 1895–1987), writer, known as a theorist of humanitarianism
- Doina Ruști, novelist
- Liviu Rebreanu, writer
- Mihail Sadoveanu, novelist
- Dinu Săraru
- Mihail Sebastian, writer, playwright
- Ioan Slavici
- Bogdan Suceavă, Romanian-American
- Lucian Dan Teodorovici
- Dumitru Țepeneag, novelist (+French language)
- Tristan Tzara (born Samuel Rosenstoc; 1896–1963), avant-garde poet, essayist, and performance artist
- Nicolae Iorga, historian, politician
- Urmuz (1883–1923), writer
- Tudor Vianu (1898–1964), literary critic, art critic, poet, philosopher, academic, and translator.
- Richard Wagner, Romanian-German writer
- Elie Wiesel, Romanian-born American writer, professor, Nobel laureate, and Holocaust survivor

==== Literary critics ====
- George Călinescu
- Matei Călinescu
- Paul Cernat
- Mihai Cimpoi
- Șerban Cioculescu
- Pompiliu Constantinescu
- Ovid S. Crohmălniceanu
- Constantin Dobrogeanu-Gherea
- Garabet Ibrăileanu
- Virgil Ierunca
- Eugen Lovinescu
- Monica Lovinescu
- Titu Maiorescu
- Nicolae Manolescu
- Ovidiu Papadima
- Edgar Papu
- Ovidiu Pecican
- Perpessicius

==== Historians ====
- Gheorghe I. Brătianu
- George Călinescu
- Constantin Daicoviciu
- Nicolae Densușianu
- Constantin C. Giurescu
- Neagu Djuvara
- Adrian Cioroianu
- Dinu C. Giurescu, Member of the American Romanian Academy of Arts and Sciences and Member of the Romanian Academy since 2002.
- Nicolae Iorga
- Vasile Pârvan
- A. D. Xenopol
- Alexandru Zub

==== Journalists ====
- Noël Bernard
- Teodor Brateș, radio host and television journalist
- Ion Cristoiu
- Eugen Filotti, journalist, Director of the Press
- Leonard Miron, journalist and Romanian National TV presenter
- Cristian Tudor Popescu, journalist and science-fiction writer
- Pamfil Șeicaru, journalist (Gândirea, Bucovina) member of Romanian Parliament, Director of Curentul

==== Linguists ====
- Eugenio Coșeriu
- Alexandru Graur
- Iorgu Iordan
- Ernest Klein
- I.C. Massim
- Emil Petrovici

=== Music ===
See also Music of Romania, especially for contemporary pop musicians.

==== Composers ====
- Ana-Maria Avram, composer
- Pascal Bentoiu, composer
- Tiberiu Brediceanu, composer and conductor
- Nicolae Bretan, opera composer
- Eduard Caudella, composer
- Paul Constantinescu, composer
- Dimitrie Cuclin, composer
- Constantin Dimitrescu, composer, cellist
- Sabin Dragoi, composer
- Iancu Dumitrescu, composer, conductor, musicologist
- George Enescu, composer, violinist, pianist, conductor, teacher
- Iosif Ivanovici
- Dinu Lipatti
- Liviu Marinescu, composer
- Octavian Nemescu, composer
- Ștefan Niculescu, composer
- Nonna Otescu, composer
- Anton Pann, composer
- Ciprian Porumbescu, composer
- Horațiu Rădulescu, composer
- Octave Octavian Teodorescu, composer
- Cornel Trailescu, composer
- Iannis Xenakis, composer born in Romania

==== Musicians ====
- Olivia Addams, singer and songwriter
- Dan Andrei Aldea, rock guitarist, composer, singer
- Christian Badea, conductor
- Lucian Ban, jazz composer & pianist
- Carla's Dreams, singer-, musician
- Sergiu Celibidache, orchestra conductor
- Nicole Cherry, singer
- Connect-R, rapper
- Marius Constant, originator of the Twilight Zone theme
- Marin Constantin, conductor
- Nicu Covaci, rock guitarist, composer, vocalist
- Michael Cretu, musician founder of (Enigma)
- Grigoraș Dinicu, violinist, composer
- Adrian Erlandsson, drummer (At the Gates), Swedish with Romanian background
- Daniel Erlandsson, drummer (Arch Enemy), Swedish with Romanian background
- George Georgescu, orchestra conductor
- Valeriu Găină, guitarist
- Tudor Gheorghe, musician, composer and singer
- Nicolae Guță, singer
- Clara Haskil, pianist
- Hugo Jan Huss, orchestra conductor and violinist
- Antonia Iacobescu, singer
- Inna, singer-songwriter, dancer
- Ovidiu Lipan, drummer (Phoenix)
- Dinu Lipatti, pianist, composer
- Radu Lupu, pianist
- Ion Marin, conductor
- Cristi Minculescu, rock singer and composer
- Anca Parghel, jazz singer and composer
- Jonel (Ionel) Perlea, conductor
- Valentin Radu, conductor
- Florin Salam, singer
- Constantin Silvestri, orchestra conductor and composer
- Alexandra Stan, singer, musician, entertainer, model, dancer
- Laura Stoica, pop-rock singer and composer
- Octave Octavian Teodorescu, composer, vanguard rock musician, multi-instrumentist (guitars, keyboards, programmable instruments)
- Cristian Vasile, tango singer
- Yeat, rapper
- Dorin Liviu Zaharia, composer and singer
- Gheorghe Zamfir, pan flute musician

===== Classic =====
- Zeno Costa, tenor
- Ileana Cotrubaș, soprano
- Hariclea Darclée, soprano
- Angela Gheorghiu, soprano
- Dinu Lipatti, pianist and composer
- Radu Lupu, pianist
- Nelly Miricioiu, soprano
- Mariana Nicolescu, soprano
- Mihaela Ursuleasa, pianist
- Leontina Vaduva, soprano
- Virginia Zeani, soprano

===== Folk and derivatives =====
- Maria Tănase, Romanian popular music singer

===== Instruments =====
- Alexander Bălănescu, violinist
- Ion Miu, cimbalom player
- Johnny Răducanu, jazz pianist
- Ion Voicu, violinist
- Gheorghe Zamfir, panpipes player

===== Pop and techno =====
- Nicoleta Alexandru, pop and techno singer
- Loredana Groza, pop singer
- Gabriela and Mihaela Modorcea, twins sisters comprising the duo Indiggo

== Film and theatre ==
- Mircea Albulescu, actor
- Monica Bârlădeanu, actress
- Radu Beligan, actor, director
- Joana Benedek, actress
- Ion Luca Caragiale, playwright
- Ion Caramitru, actor
- Ion Cojar, acting teacher, founder of the Romanian method acting school
- Gheorghe Dinică, actor
- Maria Filotti, actress
- Marcel Iureș, actor
- Cătălin Mitulescu, film director
- Maia Morgenstern, actress
- Cristian Mungiu, director of 4 Months, 3 Weeks and 2 Days
- Jean Negulescu, film director, Oscar nominee
- Sergiu Nicolaescu, film director
- Amza Pellea, actor
- Florin Piersic, actor
- Florian Pittiș, actor
- Alina Plugaru, pornographic actress
- Elvira Popescu, actress
- Corneliu Porumboiu, film director
- Cristi Puiu, film director
- Victor Rebengiuc, actor
- Edward G. Robinson, actor
- Alec Secăreanu, actor
- Sebastian Stan, actor
- Saviana Stănescu, playwright
- Constantin Tănase, cabaretist, comic and poet, shot by the soviet army of occupation in Bucharest, in 1945
- Grigore Vasiliu Birlic, actor
- Johnny Weissmuller, actor

== Religion ==
- Teoctist Arăpașu, Patriarch of the Romanian Orthodox Church
- Arsenie Boca
- Daniel Ciobotea, incumbent Patriarch of the Romanian Orthodox Church
- Miron Cristea, first Patriarch of the Romanian Orthodox Church
- Iuliu Hossu, Greek-Catholic bishop of the Cluj-Gherla Diocese and later cardinal
- Justinian Marina, Patriarch of the Romanian Orthodox Church
- Iustin Moisescu, Patriarch of the Romanian Orthodox Church
- Nicodim Munteanu, Patriarch of the Romanian Orthodox Church
- Lucian Mureșan, Greek-Catholic Metropolitan bishop, later (and incumbent) Major Archbishop of the Archdiocese of Făgăraș and Alba Iulia
- Dumitru Stăniloae, priest, translated the Philokalia into Romanian
- Vasile Suciu, Greek-Catholic Metropolitan bishop of the Archdiocese of Făgăraș and Alba Iulia
- Alexandru Todea, Greek-Catholic Metropolitan bishop of the Archdiocese of Făgăraș and Alba Iulia and later cardinal
- Lucian Turcescu, Orthodox theologian teaching at Concordia University (Montreal, Canada), president of the Canadian Society of Patristic Studies, 2004–2008
- Richard Wurmbrand, pastor, author of Tortured for Christ
- Sabina Wurmbrand, missionary, author of The Pastor's Wife

== Sports ==
=== Swimming ===
- Alin Artimon (swimmer)
- Horaţiu Badiţă
- David Popovici

=== Athletics ===
- Iolanda Balaș, high jump
- Violeta Beclea-Szekely
- Paula Ivan
- Lia Manoliu, discus thrower
- Doina Melinte, 3000 m
- Gabriela Szabo

=== Basketball ===
- Ernie Grunfeld (born 1955), NBA guard/forward & GM, Olympic champion
- Tal Karpelesz (born 1990), Israeli-Romanian basketball player
- Gheorghe Mureșan

=== Boxing ===
- Lucian Bute
- Adrian Diaconu
- Leonard Doroftei
- Florian Munteanu
- Mihai Leu
- Francisc Vaștag
- Victor Zilberman, Olympic welterweight boxer, bronze medal

=== Canoe ===
- Ivan Patzaichin
- Leon Rotman, sprint canoer, 2-time Olympic champion (C-1 10,000 meter, C-1 1,000-meter) and bronze (C-1 1,000-meter), 14 national titles
- Iuliana Țăran

=== Football ===
- Ioan Andone
- Binu Bairam
- Ilie Balaci
- Ladislau Bölöni
- Cristian Chivu
- Cosmin Contra
- Nicolae Dică
- Nicolae Dobrin
- Helmut Duckadam
- Ilie Dumitrescu
- Ioan Viorel Ganea
- Dorin Goian
- Gheorghe Hagi
- Cătălin Hâldan
- Adrian Ilie
- Anghel Iordănescu
- Emerich Jenei
- Michael Klein
- Miodrag Belodedici
- Marius Lăcătuș
- Mircea Lucescu
- Silviu Lung
- Viorel Moldovan
- Dorinel Munteanu
- Adrian Mutu
- Gheorghe Popescu
- Florin Răducioiu
- Ioan Sabău
- Bogdan Stelea

=== Gymnastics ===
- Simona Amânar
- Oana Ban
- Octavian Belu, women's coach
- Mihai Brestyan, gymnastics coach
- Sabina Cojocar
- Nadia Comăneci
- Laura Cutina
- Aurelia Dobre
- Marian Drăgulescu
- Emilia Eberle
- Gina Gogean
- Sandra Izbașa
- Marta Károlyi, gymnastics coach
- Alexandra Marinescu
- Lavinia Miloșovici
- Aura Andreea Munteanu
- Steliana Nistor
- Maria Olaru
- Cătălina Ponor
- Claudia Presăcan
- Andreea Răducan
- Monica Roșu
- Daniela Silivaș
- Nicoleta Daniela Șofronie
- Ioan Silviu Suciu
- Ecaterina Szabo
- Corina Ungureanu
- Teodora Ungureanu
- Marius Urzică

=== Rowing ===
- Constanța Burcică
- Georgeta Damian
- Elena Georgescu
- Doina Ignat
- Elisabeta Lipă
- Viorica Susanu

=== Tennis ===
- Irina Bara
- Irina-Camelia Begu
- Ana Bogdan
- Mihaela Buzărnescu
- Alexandra Cadanțu
- Sorana Cîrstea
- Marius Copil
- Jaqueline Cristian
- Ruxandra Dragomir
- Alexandra Dulgheru
- Edina Gallovits
- Simona Halep, 2018 French Open winner, 2019 Wimbledon Winner
- Victor Hănescu
- Gabriela Lee
- Florin Mergea
- Andreea Mitu
- Ilie Năstase, 1972 French Open winner, 1973 US Open winner
- Monica Niculescu
- Ioana Raluca Olaru
- Dinu Pescariu
- Magda Rurac
- Gabriela Ruse
- Virginia Ruzici, 1978 French Open winner
- Răzvan Sabău
- Irina Spîrlea
- Horia Tecău
- Patricia Maria Țig
- Ion Țiriac, also a businessman
- Adrian Ungur

=== Other sports ===
- Laura Badea (born 1970), Romanian fencer and Olympic champion in foil competition
- Luminița Dinu-Huțupan handball player
- Mathew Dumba (born 1994), NHL ice hockey player
- Alina Dumitru, Olympic judo champion
- Yohan Kende (born 1949), Israeli Olympic swimmer
- Alina Popa, IFBB professional bodybuilder
- Angelica Rozeanu (Adelstin; 1921–2006), Romanian-Israeli 17-time world table tennis champion; ITTF Hall of Fame
- Andre Spitzer (1945–1972), Israel's 1972 Summer Olympics fencing coach and victim of the Munich massacre
- Timea Toth (born 1968), Romanian-born Israeli Olympic swimmer
- Iulia Baba, IFBB Professional Bikini bodybuilder 2023 2024 and 2025 Mr. Olympia

== Science ==
=== Astronomy ===
- Cristiana Dumitrache

=== Biology ===
- Grigore Antipa, hydrobiologist
- Ana Aslan, geriatrics researcher
- Victor Babeș, biologist
- Dimitrie Brândză, botanist
- Ioan Cantacuzino, microbiologist
- Melania Cristescu, biologist
- Wilhelm Knechtel, botanist
- Nicolae Leon, biologist
- Gheorghe Marinescu, neurologist
- Nicolae Minovici, forensic scientist
- Mina Minovici, forensic scientist
- George Emil Palade, 1974 Nobel Prize in Physiology or Medicine winner
- Constantin Parhon, endocrinologist
- Nicolae Paulescu, discovered insulin
- Emil Racoviță, biologist and speleologist

=== Chemistry ===
- Ecaterina Ciorănescu-Nenițescu, chemist
- Lazăr Edeleanu, chemist
- Henrik Kacser, physical chemist
- Costin Nenițescu, founder of the Romanian school of Organic Chemistry
- Nicolae Teclu, inventor of the Teclu gas burner

=== Physicians ===
- Raed Arafat, founder of SMURD (a Syrian-born Palestinian refugee living in Romania since 1981)
- Bazil Assan, engineer, explorer and economist
- Adrian Bejan, namesake of the Bejan number
- Gheorghe Benga, physician and molecular biologist
- Alexandru Ciurcu, inventor, with M.M. Just Buisson, of the first reactive engine
- George Constantinescu, inventor
- Leon Dănăilă, neurosurgeon
- Daniel David, professor, psychologist, and psychotherapist
- Carol Davila, physician
- Anastase Dragomir, inventor of the parachute cell, predecessor of the ejection seat
- Dimitrie Gerota, anatomist, physician, radiologist, urologist
- Rodrig Goliescu, inventor of the first airplane with a tubular fuselage
- Iuliu Hațieganu, internist doctor
- Petrache Poenaru, inventor
- Elie Radu, architect, engineer
- Anghel Saligny, engineer
- Nicolae Vasilescu-Karpen, engineer
- David Wechsler, psychologist

=== Aerospace ===
- Elie Carafoli, aeronautics engineer
- Henri Coandă, aircraft designer and discoverer of the Coandă effect of fluidics
- Aurel Vlaicu, flight pioneer
- Traian Vuia

=== Astronauts ===
- Dumitru Prunariu, Romania's first and only cosmonaut

=== Mathematics ===
- Titu Andreescu
- Emanoil Bacaloglu
- Dan Barbilian
- Alexandra Bellow
- Julius Borcea
- Liliana Borcea
- Cristian S. Calude
- Ana Caraiani
- Zoia Ceaușescu
- Alina Carmen Cojocaru
- Nicușor Dan
- Anton Davidoglu
- Cornelia Druțu
- Ciprian Foias
- Alexandru Froda
- Tudor Ganea
- Nicholas Georgescu-Roegen
- Ion Ghica
- Alexandru Ghika
- Emil Grosswald
- Spiru Haret
- Caius Iacob
- Adrian Ioana
- Eleny Ionel
- Cassius Ionescu-Tulcea
- Sergiu Klainerman
- Traian Lalescu
- Florian Luca
- Alexandru Lupaș
- George Lusztig
- Ciprian Manolescu
- Solomon Marcus
- George Marinescu
- Octav Mayer
- Preda Mihăilescu
- Gheorghe Mihoc
- Irina Mitrea
- Petru Mocanu
- Grigore Moisil, Member of the Romanian Academy
- Elena Moldovan Popoviciu
- Gheorghe Moroșanu
- Henri Moscovici
- Mircea Mustață
- Miron Nicolescu, Member of the Romanian Academy
- Octav Onicescu
- Magda Peligrad
- Valentin Poénaru
- Dimitrie Pompeiu
- Florian Pop
- Mihnea Popa
- Sorin Popa
- Cristian Dumitru Popescu
- Nicolae Popescu, Member of the Romanian Academy
- Tiberiu Popoviciu
- Tudor Ratiu
- Ovidiu Savin
- Rodica Simion
- Robert Steinberg
- Simion Stoilow
- Ileana Streinu
- Bogdan Suceavă
- Gabriel Sudan
- Daniel Tătaru
- Gheorghe Țițeica, Member of the Romanian Academy
- Monica Vișan
- Dan-Virgil Voiculescu
- Gheorghe Vrănceanu
- Alexandru Zaharescu

=== Physics ===
- Réka Albert
- Emanoil Bacaloglu, physicist, chemist and mathematician
- Victor Albert Bailey, physicist (Romanian on his mother's side)
- Radu Dan Constantinescu, physicist, President of the Balkan Physical Union
- Peter George Oliver Freund, physicist
- Mihai Gavrilă, theoretical quantum physicist, professor, Corresponding Member of the Romanian Academy
- Horia Hulubei, atomic physicist, professor, Member of the Romanian Academy
- Theodor V. Ionescu, plasma physicist, professor, Member of the Romanian Academy
- Ștefania Mărăcineanu
- Alexandru Marin, physicist, professor
- Victor Mercea
- Florentina I. Mosora, biophysicist and nuclear medicine professor, Member of the Royal Academy of Belgium
- Horațiu Năstase
- Ioan-Iovitz Popescu
- Alexandru Proca, theoretical physicist, Member of the Romanian Academy
- Ștefan Procopiu, theoretical physicist, Member of the Romanian Academy
- Șerban Țițeica, theoretical physicist, founder of the Romanian modern school of theoretical physics, Member of the Romanian Academy

=== Computer science ===
- Andrei Alexandrescu, computer scientist
- Mihai Nadin, computer scientist
- Ștefan Odobleja, scientist, precursor of cybernetics
- Mihai Pătrașcu, computer scientist
- Ion Stoica, computer scientist
- Victor Toma, computer engineer, born in Romanian Bessarabia
- Matei Zaharia, computer scientist

=== Others ===
- Dionisie Ghermani (1922–2009), professor, writer, philanthropist, and political activist
- Dimitrie Gusti, sociologist
- Ernest Krausz (1931–2018), Israeli professor of sociology and President at Bar Ilan University
- David Mitrany (1888–1975), political theorist
- Jacob Levy Moreno (1889-1974), Romanian physician and social scientist
- Christian Patroiu, Project Manager, HVAC
- George Pomutz (1818–1882), ethnic Romanian United States general in the Civil War, and diplomat
- Emil Racoviță, polar explorer
- Emilia Săulea (1904–1998), geologist and paleontologist
- Ruxandra Sireteanu (1945–2008), neuroscientist
- Henri Stahl, stenographer
- Henri H. Stahl, cultural anthropologist, ethnographer, sociologist, social historian

== Polymaths ==
- Simion Bărnuțiu, jurist, priest, politician, publicist, lawyer, writer, professor
- Matila Ghyka, famous polymath, mathematician and author
- Mihail Kogălniceanu, lawyer, historian, publicist, politician, cultural peacemaker
- Bogdan Suceavă, mathematician, novelist, journalist, professor of mathematics at California State University, Fullerton

== Business ==
- Octav Botnar, Nissan UK chairman, billionaire
- Iosif Constantin Drăgan, gas tycoon, billionaire and academic
- John DeLorean, US car industry executive, engineer, inventor of Pontiac GTO Muscle car and DeLorean
- Dinu Patriciu, former CEO of Rompetrol
- Dan Petrescu, businessman and billionaire
- Anastasia Soare billionaire, the CEO and founder of Anastasia Beverly Hills

== Miscellaneous ==
- Ana Cumpănaș (a.k.a. Anna Sage), the "Woman in Red" who helped FBI catch John Dillinger
- Bunica Gherghina, TikToker
- Iana Matei, activist and founder of Reaching Out
- Ilie Ciocan (1913-2026), the oldest known person in Romanian history

== List of Romanians who were born outside present-day Romania ==
This is a list of Romanians who were born outside present-day Romania.

=== Austria ===
- Victor Babeș, physician, biologist, bacteriologist

=== Republic of Moldova ===
- Ștefan Baștovoi, orthodox monk
- Maria Cebotari, opera singer
- Emil Constantinescu, president of Romania (1996–2000)
- Eugenio Coșeriu, linguist
- Paul Goma, writer
- Lia Manoliu, athlete
- Adrian Păunescu, poet, politician

=== Russia ===
- Alexander Kolchak, partially Romanian, descendant of Iliaș Colceag, Russian Admiral; Supreme Ruler of Russia (White Guard State) (1918–1920)

=== Serbia ===
- Zoran Lilić, president of the Federal Republic of Yugoslavia, 1993–1997
- Maria, Queen consort of Yugoslavia
- Baba Novac, captain under Mihai Viteazul and hajduk
- Vasko Popa, poet
- Bojan Aleksandrović, Romanian Orthodox priest
- Emil Petrovici, linguist
- Marinika Tepić, politician
- Predrag Balašević, politician

=== Ukraine ===
- Alexandru Averescu, prime minister of Romania (1918, 1920–1921, 1926–1927)
- Bogdan Petriceicu Hasdeu, philologist, writer
- Lucian Pintilie, film director, screenwriter
- Sofia Rotaru, singer
- Nicolae Văcăroiu, prime minister of Romania (1992–1996)
- Sofia Vicoveanca, singer

== See also ==
- List of Romanian inventors and discoverers
- List of Romanian-Americans
- List of Aromanians
- List of people by nationality
