= Dumitrache =

Dumitrache is a Romanian surname that may refer to

- Cristiana Dumitrache (born 1956), Romanian astronomer
- Dragoș-Nicolae Dumitrache (born 1964), Romanian chess master
- Florea Dumitrache (1948–2007), Romanian football forward
  - Stadionul Florea Dumitrache, a multi-use stadium in Bucharest, Romania
- Ioan Dumitrache (1889–1977), Romanian army general
- Maria Magdalena Dumitrache (born 1977), Romanian rower
