= Skirt-bag =

Hybrid fashion item made by Ivana Barač

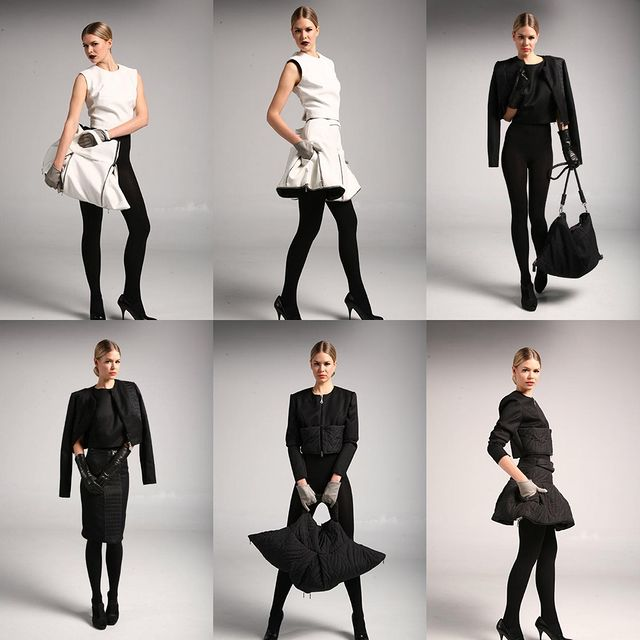
Skirt-bag by Ivana Barač from 2008, Dubrovnik, CROATIA

Skirt-bag (Croatian: Suknja-torba) - a hybrid fashion design item made by Ivana Barač presented in 2008 in Kino EUROPA, Zagreb, Croatia. Design is not a common baggy skirt design, but a specific dual function item with exceptional construction.

Ivana Barač is a Croatian fashion designer from Dubrovnik with a background in stone conservation. After studying at Istituto di Moda Burgo in Milan, Barač focused on the design construction and started working with a collection of 14 variations of bags that were all dual-functional, including the Skirt-bag presented in Zagreb Fashion Week in 2008.

The use of zippers enables the item to be worn as a skirt and carried as a bag.

Multifunctional design captured positive critical acclaim and attention of audience in the moment when recession was hitting Europe and Fashion hard. Grgo Zečić, now fashion director of Vmen, said that one needed to be excellent constructor for the bag to convert to skirtand back, with very well composed geometry and avantguarde approach.
