= Coandă =

Coandă may refer to:

- Constantin Coandă (1857–1932), Romanian Army general, Prime Minister of Romania during World War I.
  - Coandă cabinet, Constantin Coandă's government in 1918.
- George Coandă (born 1937), Romanian journalist and historian.
- Henri Coandă (1886–1972), Constantin's son, aircraft designer and inventor.
  - The Coandă effect, a phenomenon that causes a fluid to be attracted to another object, named after Henri Coandă.
  - Coandă-1910, an airplane designed by Henri Coandă.
