= Gianina =

Gianina is a feminine given name. Notable people with the name include:

- Gianina Beleaga (born 1995), Romanian rower
- Gianina Ernst (born 1998), German ski jumper
- GiaNina Paolantonio (born 2005), American dancer, singer, choreographer
- Gianina Șerban (born 1983), Romanian politician

== See also ==
- Gianna
- Giannina Facio (born 1955), Costa Rican actress and film producer
