= Moroșanu =

Moroşanu is a Romanian surname. Notable people with the surname include:

- Andrada-Maria Moroșanu (born 2002), Romanian rower
- Angela Moroșanu (born 1986), Romanian sprinter
- Cătălin Moroșanu (born 1984), Romanian kickboxer
- Gheorghe Moroșanu (born 1950), Romanian mathematician

== See also ==
- Moroşan
