= Irinel Popescu =

Romanian surgeon

- Born: 22 April 1953; Filiași, Dolj County, Romanian People's Republic
- Education: Carol Davila University of Medicine and Pharmacy
- Years active: 1977–present
- Known for: first human liver transplant in Romania, first program of robotic surgery in Romania
- Medical career
- Profession: Surgeon, Researcher, Politician
- Institutions: Fundeni Clinical Institute, Bucharest
- Sub-specialties: Liver transplantation, HPB surgery, Oncologic surgery, Minimal invasive surgery
- Awards: Order of the Star of Romania, Grand Cross rank Order of the Crown of Romania, Officer rank Ordre national du Mérite; Order of the Republic (Moldova)

Irinel Popescu (born 22 April 1953) is a Romanian surgeon, specialized in hepato-pancrato-biliary surgery, and a corresponding member of the Romanian Academy (since November 2013). In 2000, he introduced liver transplantation in Romania and in 2008, he also firstly brought robotic surgery to this country.

== Career ==
Irinel Popescu was born in Filiași, Dolj County, graduated in 1977 the Faculty of Medicine at the Carol Davila University of Medicine and Pharmacy in Bucharest.

After 1995, he took part in the construction of the Romanian organ transplantation program. In 1999, Popescu became Professor of Surgery at the Carol Davila UMF and Head of the Department of Surgery at the Fundeni Clinical Institute. In 2000, he obtained the certificates of the Ministry of Health of specialization in liver surgery and liver transplantation, oncological surgery, laparoscopic surgery, and medical management of health. Also in 2000, he introduced liver transplantation at the clinical level (the first successful surgeries on an adult, with a whole liver, and a child, with a fragment of a liver) in the Center for Digestive Diseases and Liver Transplantation Fundeni. Currently, the number of transplant surgeries has exceeds 1,000.

He also had important contributions to establishing transplantation programs in the Republican Hospital in Chișinău (2013), the Sfânta Maria Hospital in Bucharest (2013), and the Sfântul Spiridon Hospital in Iași (2016). In 2006, he founded ARCHBPTH (Romanian Association of Hepato-bilio-pancreatic Surgery and Liver Transplantation).

In 2008, Popescu introduced robotic surgery in Romania.

Since 2012, he has been the Head of the Center for Digestive Diseases and Liver Transplantation – Fundeni Clinical Institute. In 2012, he won a European funded project for the construction of the Center of Excellence in Translational Medicine (CEMT) within the Fundeni Clinical Institute. The center was inaugurated in March 2016 with laboratories of pathology, molecular biology, cell cultures, a tumor bank, and a laboratory of experimental surgery.

As the coordinator of numerous research projects, he obtained the title of Scientific Researcher first degree (2019) and made important contributions to the genomics of pancreatic cancer and cholangiocarcinoma.

Since 2016, he has been a professor in the School of Medicine at Titu Maiorescu University, where he established the Nicolae Cajal Medical Research Institute. In 2020, he was appointed Associated Professor at the Faculty of Medicine of Dunărea de Jos University in Galați, Enna extension (Italy), and received the title of Professor Emeritus of Dunărea de Jos University (2020). He was also appointed Visiting Professor at the University of Belgrade (2019) and at the Nicolae Testemițanu State University of Medicine and Pharmacy in Chișinău, Moldova.

== Selected Books ==
- The IASGO Textbook of multidisciplinary management of hepato-pancreato-biliary diseases, Masatoshi Makuuchi, Norihiro Kokudo, Irinel Popescu, Jaques Belghiti, Ho-Song Han, Kyoichi Takaori, Dan G. Duda (Editors), Springer Nature, 2022.
- Liver surgery, Irinel Popescu (Editor) (2 vols), University Publishing House "Carol Davila" Bucharest 2004 (Iuliu Hațieganu prize of the Romanian Academy)
- Liver Transplantation, Irinel Popescu (editor), Academiei Publishing House, 2011. ISBN 9789732720547
- Textbook of hepato-bilio-pancreatic surgery and liver transplantation, Irinel Popescu (Editor), Romanian Academy Publishing House 2016, ISBN 9789732725924
- Textbook of Surgery - (10 volumes), Irinel Popescu (Editor) - Publishing House of the Romanian Academy 2007 - 2009,
- Textbook of Surgery 2nd edition (12 volumes), Irinel Popescu, Constantin Ciuce (Editors), Romanian Academy Publishing House, 2011–2013
- The Flying Publisher Guide to Hepatitis C Treatment, Costin Cernescu, Simona Ruta, Liana Gheorghe, Speranța Iacob, Irinel Popescu, Richard Sebastian Wanless, Edition 2011, Flying Publisher & Kamps. ISBN 978-3-942687-04-1.
- Minimally invasive surgery - advanced techniques, C. Dragomirescu, I. Popescu (under the editorship), Celsius Publishing House, Bucharest, 2000, Iuliu Hațieganu prize of the Romanian Academy.

== Published papers ==
- As of 2023: 526 papers listed on Web of Science, 7,299 citations, h-index 45.

== Doctor Honoris Causa ==
- University of Medicine and Pharmacy, Craiova, Romania (2006)
- Ovidius University, Constanța, Romania (2007)
- Nicolae Testemițanu State University of Medicine and Pharmacy, Chișinău, Republic of Moldova (2010)
- Iuliu Hațieganu University of Medicine and Pharmacy, Cluj-Napoca, Romania (2012)
- University Apollonia, Iași, Romania (2018)
- University of Galați, Romania (2019)
- Grigore T. Popa University of Medicine and Pharmacy, Iași, Romania (2023)

== Selected administrative appointments ==
- Director of the Postgraduate Training Institute for Doctors and Pharmacists (1998)
- Secretary of State at the Ministry of Health (1999–2001)
- Medical Director of Fundeni Clinical Institute (2000–2004)
- Senator – Chairman of the Committee on Education, Youth and Sport (2004–2008)
- President of the National Insurance House (2009)

== Selected Awards and honors ==
- Iuliu Hațieganu Award of the Romanian Academy (2000)
- Award of the Romanian College of Physicians (2001) for achievements in surgery

== Selected Medals ==
- Order of the Crown of Romania, Officer rank (2013)
- Order of the Star of Romania, Grand Cross rank (2013)
- Ordre national du Mérite (France) (2011)
- Order of the Republic (Moldova) (2013)

== Bibliography ==
1. Dora Petrila, "Conversations with surgeon Irinel Popescu", Humanitas Publishing House, Bucharest, 2003
2. http://www.irinel-popescu.ro Archived April 21, 2017, at the Wayback Machine.
3. https://www.romtransplant.ro/en/history-of-transplant/ Archived November 26, 2013, at the Wayback Machine.
4. Otovescu Dumitru - Irinel Popescu or the triumph of liver transplantation in Romania, Beladi Publishing House, Craiova, 2014
5. Victor Tomulescu, Catalin Copaescu: "Robotic surgery in Romania" in Victor Voicu, Irinel Popescu (coordinators): "Files from the history of Romanian medicine", Romanian Academy Publishing House, Bucharest, 2020
6. How many glasses of wine can we drink per day. Professor Irinel Popescu: "I went to a clinic in Germany and there I spoke with a doctor who had a broader and open view of medicine"
7. The surgeon is no longer alone - dialogue with Prof. Dr. Irinel POPESCU
8. Food that is good to eat daily. Prof. Dr. Irinel Popescu: "Other than that, we have to vary!"
9. https://www.utm.ro/facultatea-de-medicina/cadre-didactice/
10. University Prof. dr. Irinel Popescu – the father of liver transplantation in Romania, will receive the title of Doctor Honoris Causa of UMF Iasi
11. https://www.researchgate.net/profile/Irinel-Popescu-2
12. From 2015, the Center of Excellence in Translational Medicine will operate in Fundeni
13. Exclusive - Prof. Dr. Irinel Popescu, "the father of liver transplantation", revelations about his remarkable career
14. https://transplant.ro/consiliu/
15. https://www.utm.ro/cercetare-stiintifica/institutul-de-cercetari-stiintifice-medicale-nicolae-cajal/personal-de-cercetare/
16. https://iasgo.org/index.php/component/content/article/8-general-articles/69-pancreatic-cancer
17. Impact of Sustained Virological Response on Metabolic Profile and Kidney Function in Cured HCV Liver Transplant Recipients
18. Parenchyma Sparing ALPPS - A New Technical Variant. Case Presentation (with video)
19. https://www.utm.ro/en/irinel-popescu/
