= Narcisa Pheres =

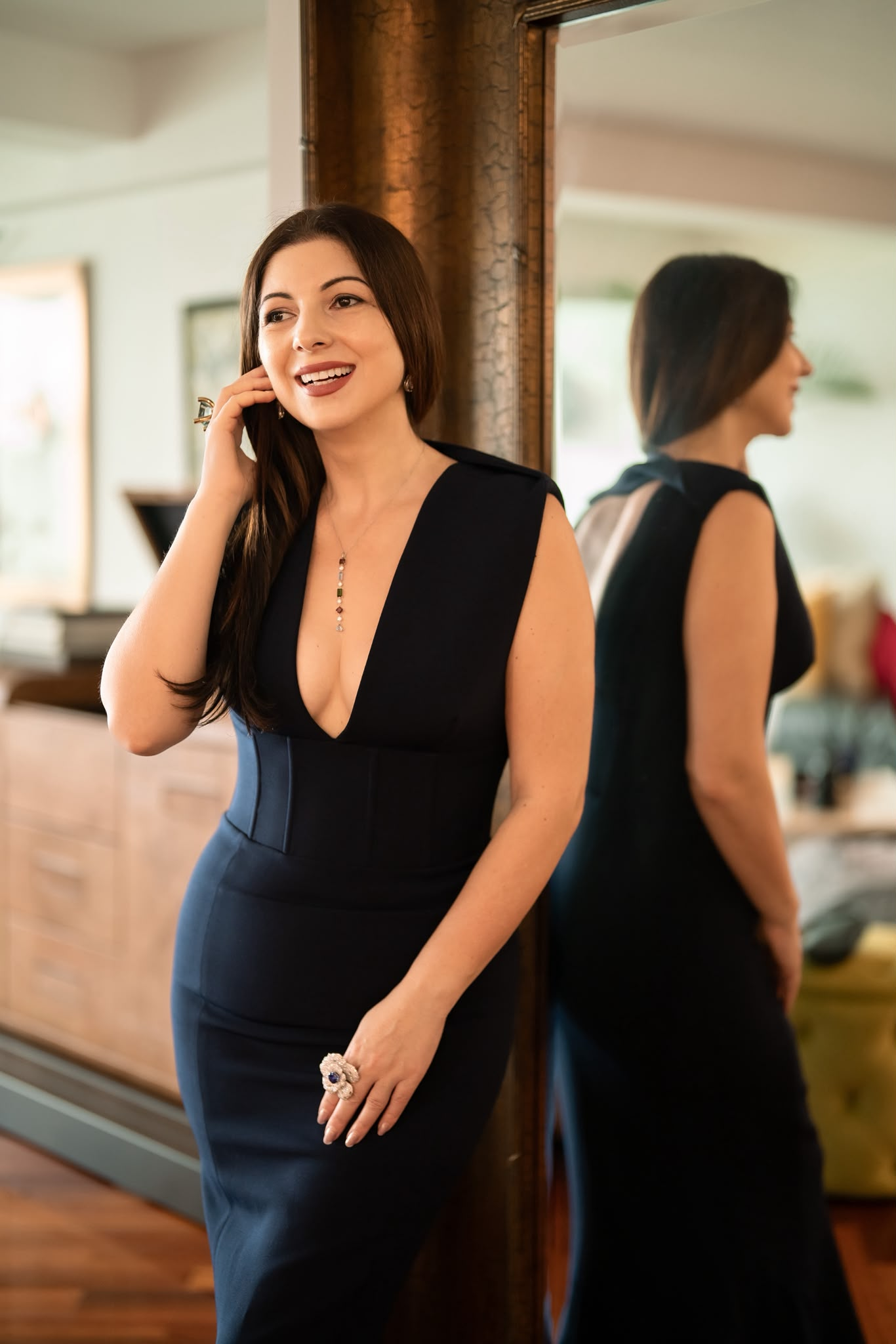
- Narcisa Pheres
- Education: University of Bucharest, Instituto di Moda Burgo, Milan, Central St Martins, London
- Occupations: Entrepreneur, Jewelry designer

Narcisa Pheres is an entrepreneur and creative director and founder of PHERES and Narcisa Pheres Fine Jewelry, Italian luxury brand.

== Biography ==
Pheres was born and raised in Romania. She graduated from University of Bucharest and then went on to study fashion design at the Instituto di Moda Burgo in Milan and fashion marketing studies at Central St Martins, London. She also got her GIA Jewelry design and Diamond Certification from Carlsbad, CA.

She started her career as a designer in 2000 where she worked on the luxury fashion and diamond jewelry, designing exclusive auction pieces for Japanese collectors. Pheres started her own brand PHERES and Narcisa Pheres Fine Jewelry in 2006 in Japan and continued to expand her line with the launch of her evening gowns, menswear and one-of-a-kind jewelry pieces. In 2011, she moved to Hong Kong and started doing Pheres trunk shows primarily in London, Milan, Florence and Venice. In 2015, she launched womenswear capsule collection.

Pheres has been recognized for her accomplishments as a designer. Her work as the Creative Director of Narcisa Pheres Fine Jewelry has been featured at the Golden Globes, Oscars, Grammys, Screen Actors Guild Award, Met Gala and client includes Michelle Obama, Jennifer Lopez, Beyoncé, Rihanna, Madonna and others. In April 2018, Pheres was appointed to her Highness Princess Olga Romanoff as the official jewelry supplier.
