= Titu Maiorescu University =

- Universitatea Titu Maiorescu
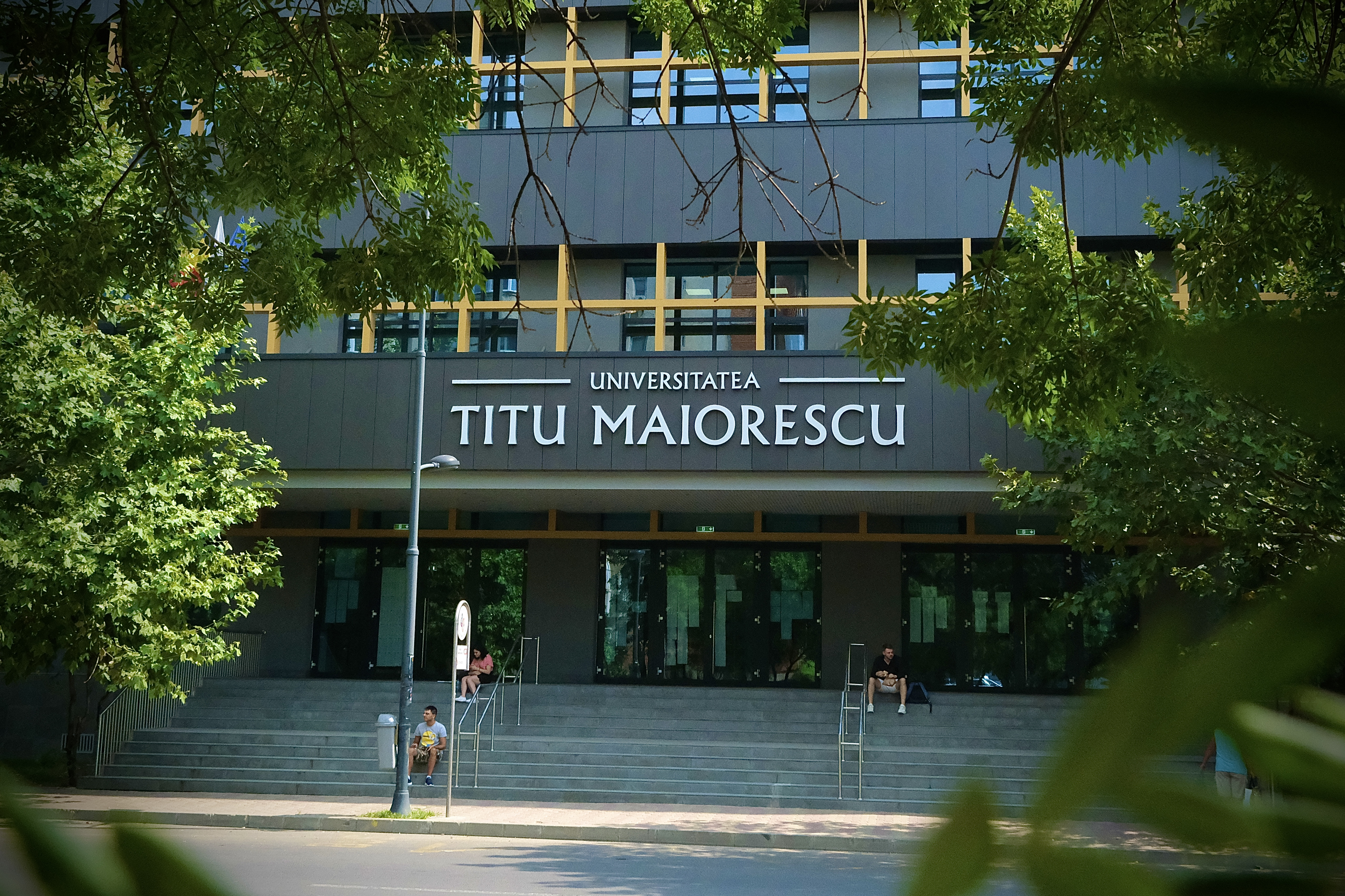
- Type: Private
- Established: September 20, 1990; 36 years ago
- President: Iosif R. Urs
- Rector: Daniel Cochior
- Location: Bucharest, Romania; 44°24′49″N 26°06′52″E
- Website: www.utm.ro

The Universitatea Titu Maiorescu is a private university located at 187 Calea Văcărești, Sector 4, Bucharest, Romania. It is named after the literary critic and politician Titu Maiorescu.

The university was founded in 1990, with Avram Filipaș serving as its founding rector from 1990 to 2006. He was succeeded as rector by Iosif Urs (2006–2012), Smaranda Angheni (2006–2020), and now Daniel Cochior; the President of the university is Iosif Urs.

== Faculty ==
- Leon Dănăilă
- Irinel Popescu

== Alumni ==
- Cristian Bușoi
- Sanda Ladoși
- Vlad Popescu Piedone
- Gianina Șerban
- Georgiana Teodorescu
