= Ana Maria Savu =

Romanian handball player (born 1990)

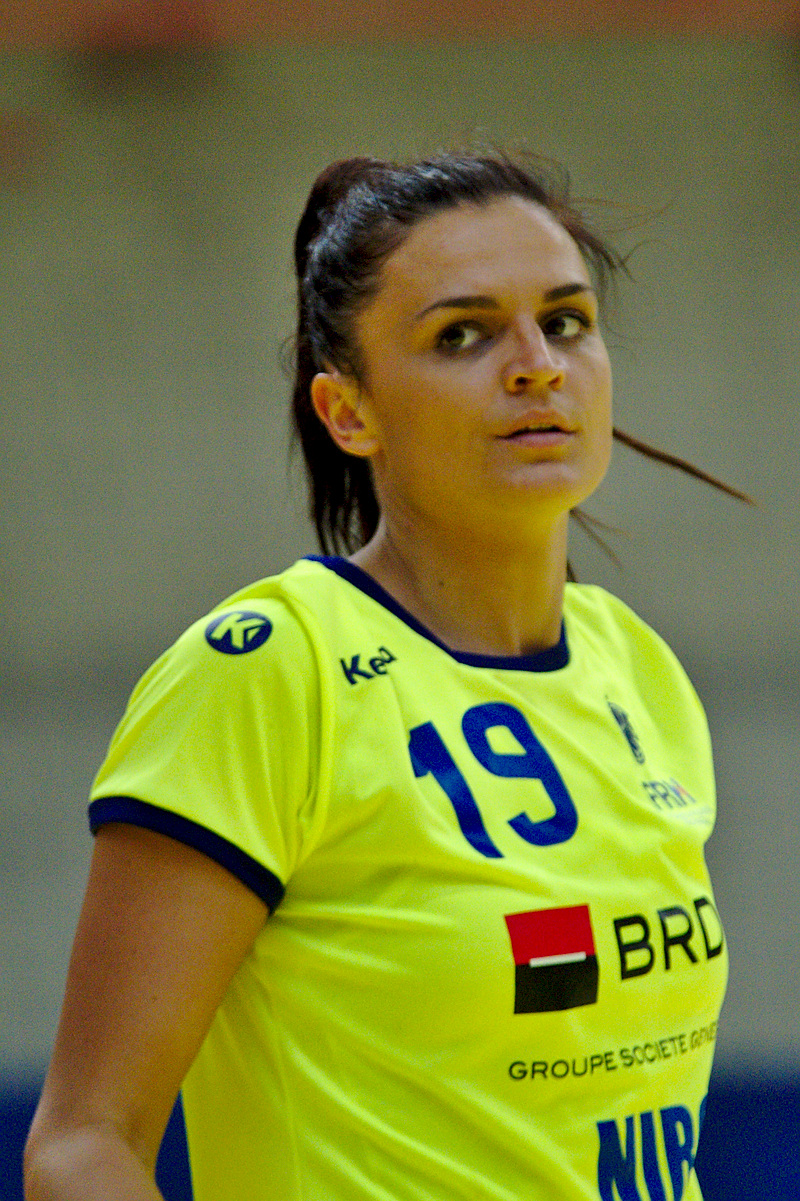

Personal information
- Nationality: Romanian
- Born: 24 February 1990 (age 36) Darabani, Romania
- Height: 1.86 m (6 ft 1 in)

Sport
- Sport: Handball
- Position: Right back
- Current club: SCM Craiova
- Number: 90

Senior clubs
- Years: Team
- 2008–2009: CSM Roman
- 2009–2014: HC Dunărea Brăila
- 2013–2014: → Neptun Constanța (loan)
- 2014–2016: CSM Unirea Slobozia
- 2016–2018: HC Zalău
- 2018–2019: Kisvárdai KC
- 2019: SCM Râmnicu Vâlcea
- 2019– 2021: SCM Craiova
- 2021-: SCM Gloria Buzău (women's handball)
National team
Years	Team	Apps	(Gls)
2017–	Romania	38	(40)

Ana Maria Savu (née Dragut; born 24 February 1990) is a Romanian handballer for SCM Gloria Buzău (women's handball) and the Romanian national team.

== Individual awards ==
- Prosport Best Right Back of the Romanian Liga Națională: 2018
