= Moroșan =

Moroșan is a Romanian surname. Notable people with this surname include:

- Doru Moroșan (born 1953), Romanian ice hockey player
- Emilia Morosan (born 1976), Romanian-American physicist
- Octavian Morosan, better known as Kripparrian, Romanian-Canadian video game streamer

== See also ==
- Moroșanu
