= Darabani =

- Town
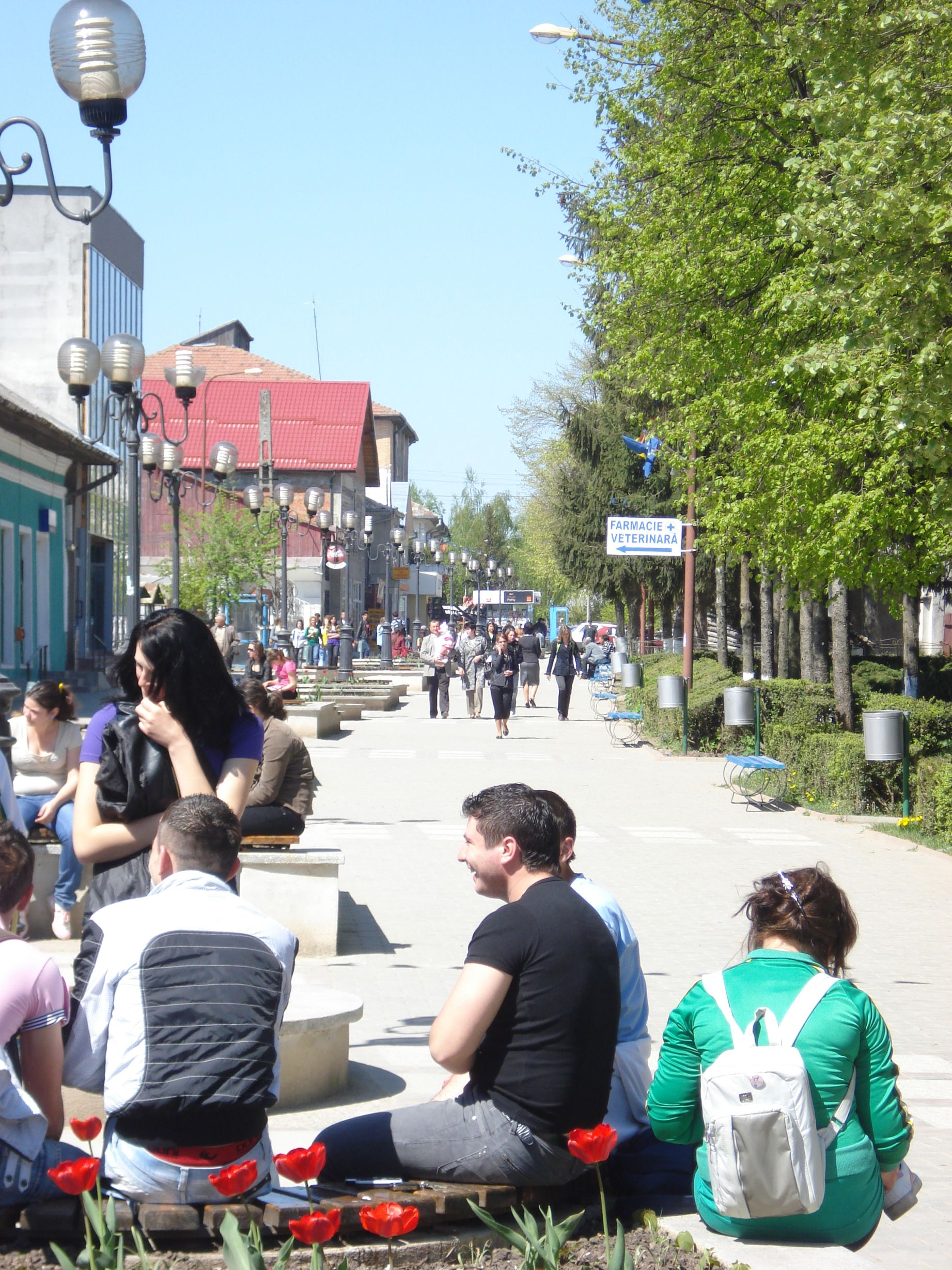

- Coat of arms

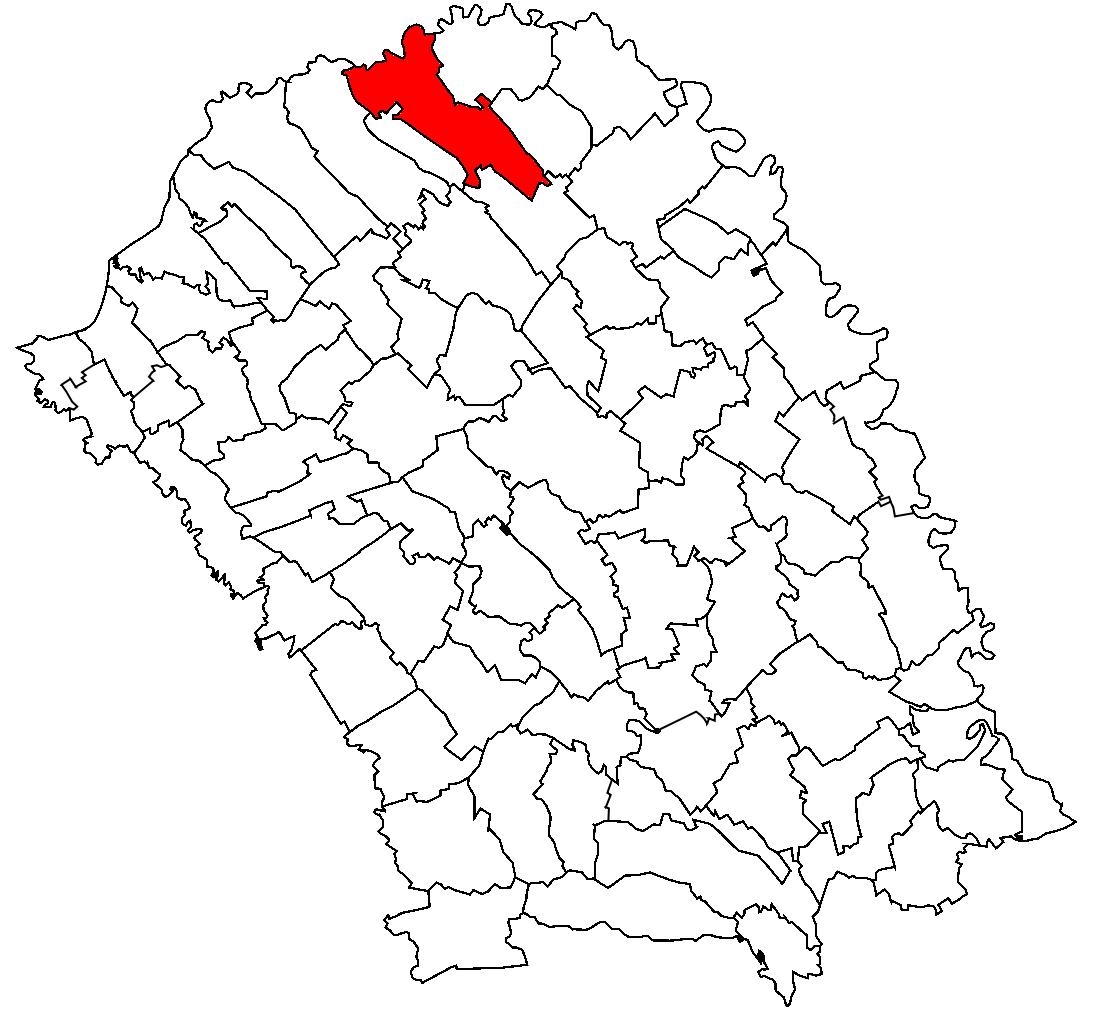
- Location in Botoșani County

- Location in Romania
- Coordinates: 48°11′11″N 26°35′21″E
- Country: Romania
- County: Botoșani

Government
  - Mayor (2024–2028): Mihai-Alin Gîrbaci (PNL)
- Area: 99.85 km^{2} (38.55 sq mi)
- Elevation: 260 m (850 ft)
- Population (2021-12-01): 11,948
  - Density: 119.7/km^{2} (309.9/sq mi)
- Time zone: UTC+02:00 (EET)
  - Summer (DST): UTC+03:00 (EEST)
- Postal code: 715100
- Area code: (+40) 02 31
- Vehicle reg.: BT
- Website: www.primariadarabani.ro

Darabani (Romanian pronunciation: [daraˈbanʲ]) is a town in Botoșani County, Western Moldavia, Romania, and is the northernmost town in Romania. It administers three villages: Bajura, Eșanca, and Lișmănița.

The town lies on the right bank of the river Prut, close to the triple border between Romania, Ukraine, and Moldova.

The area is a setting for the 2019 Amazon Studios TV series Hanna and plays a significant role in the development of the titular character from that series.

== Geography ==
The town of Darabani is located in the northern part of Botoșani County and is the northernmost town in Romania. Near the town lies the locality of Horodiștea, the northernmost point of the country (48°15’06”N and 26°42’05”E).

The town is situated on the high, northern edge of the Moldavian Plain, in a hilly area featuring rolling interfluves shaped as small, low plateaus, ranging in elevation between 125 meters (the Prut River flood plain) and 264 meters (Buleandra Hill). The natural terrain was modified in the southern part of the town through terracing.

The town's territory has an elongated shape oriented in a NW-SE direction. The main bodies of water crossing the town's territory are the Prut River and the Podriga River, along with their tributaries. The vegetation is characteristic of a hilly zone. The predominant soils are represented by cambic chernozems.

=== Hydrography ===
The main bodies of water within the locality's territory are:

- The Prut River, along whose course the border with Ukraine is established.
- The Podriga Stream, which originates from the place called "Budăiul Fundoaiei" near Bajura and forms the two Bălășescu ponds near Darabani, which are managed for fish farming.
- A stream known by several names – Buleandra, Eșanca, Iepărie, Seliștea – which originates in the Buleandra Forest and flows into the Podriga Stream.
- The "La Căpitanul" pond in Bajura.
- The "La Gheorghiu" pond in Bajura.

The deep groundwater levels and the water table itself are found at an average depth of 8–12 meters, which decreases toward the valley floors, where springs reach the soil surface. There are several cold water springs, exceptionally good for drinking, in multiple areas of the town and its administrative neighborhoods and villages, such as the "Sipot" spring in Bajura.

=== Climate ===
Darabani has a warm-summer humid continental climate (Köppen: Dfb). The town experiences marked seasonal temperature variations, with cold winters and warm summers. According to the 1991-2020 climate normals, the mean daily temperature ranges from −3.0 °C (26.6 °F) in January to 20.7 °C (69.3 °F) in July. Average daily maximum temperatures reach approximately 26.4 °C (79.5 °F) in July, while average daily minimum temperatures fall to −5.5 °C (22.1 °F) in January.

Annual precipitation averages around 471 mm in Darabani, considerably less than in nearby Botoșani, where it reaches approximately 581 mm. Its annual precipitation is comparable to that of Constanța on the Black Sea coast. The highest temperature ever recorded in Darabani is 38.1 °C (100.6 °F) on 25 August 2012, while the lowest reached −26.2 °C (−15.2 °F) in January 1987.

Climate data for Darabani (elevation 259m, 1991–2020 normals, extremes 1987–present)
Month	Jan	Feb	Mar	Apr	May	Jun	Jul	Aug	Sep	Oct	Nov	Dec	Year
Record high °C (°F)	15.0 (59.0)	20.3 (68.5)	26.0 (78.8)	30.2 (86.4)	33.0 (91.4)	35.8 (96.4)	37.6 (99.7)	38.1 (100.6)	36.5 (97.7)	29.6 (85.3)	22.3 (72.1)	16.2 (61.2)	38.1 (100.6)
Mean daily maximum °C (°F)	−0.1 (31.8)	2.1 (35.8)	7.9 (46.2)	15.5 (59.9)	21.3 (70.3)	24.5 (76.1)	26.4 (79.5)	26.2 (79.2)	20.7 (69.3)	14.0 (57.2)	6.7 (44.1)	1.1 (34.0)	13.9 (57.0)
Daily mean °C (°F)	−3.0 (26.6)	−1.4 (29.5)	3.2 (37.8)	10.0 (50.0)	15.6 (60.1)	19.1 (66.4)	20.7 (69.3)	20.3 (68.5)	15.1 (59.2)	9.3 (48.7)	3.5 (38.3)	−1.6 (29.1)	9.2 (48.6)
Mean daily minimum °C (°F)	−5.5 (22.1)	−4.2 (24.4)	−0.4 (31.3)	5.3 (41.5)	10.5 (50.9)	14.2 (57.6)	15.8 (60.4)	15.4 (59.7)	10.7 (51.3)	5.7 (42.3)	0.9 (33.6)	−4.0 (24.8)	5.4 (41.7)
Record low °C (°F)	−26.2 (−15.2)	−23.2 (−9.8)	−19.0 (−2.2)	−5.0 (23.0)	0.6 (33.1)	4.8 (40.6)	7.7 (45.9)	7.2 (45.0)	0.9 (33.6)	−6.8 (19.8)	−16.8 (1.8)	−24.5 (−12.1)	−26.2 (−15.2)
Average precipitation mm (inches)	16.1 (0.63)	18.4 (0.72)	25.3 (1.00)	33.0 (1.30)	54.5 (2.15)	79.4 (3.13)	72.5 (2.85)	46.3 (1.82)	43.0 (1.69)	33.1 (1.30)	27.1 (1.07)	22.6 (0.89)	471.3 (18.55)
Average precipitation days (≥ 1.0 mm)	4.4	3.9	4.8	6.2	7.9	8.5	6.7	4.8	5.6	4.9	4.7	6.1	68.5
Average snowy days	7.7	6.2	2.7	1.4	0	0	0	0	0	0	2.8	6.7	27.5
Source 1: RoCliHom (1991-2020), Valuri de căldură în România (September 2015)
Source 2: Revistă Geografică 2001

Historical population
Year	Pop.	±%
1930	10,748	—
1948	11,379	+5.9%
1977	10,880	−4.4%
1992	11,804	+8.5%
2002	12,002	+1.7%
2011	9,893	−17.6%
2021	11,948	+20.8%
Source: Census data

== Natives ==
- Leon Dănăilă (born 1933), neurosurgeon, author, and politician
- Marieta Ilcu (born 1962), long jumper
- Gheorghe Moroșanu (born 1950), mathematician
- Ana Maria Savu (born 1990), handballer
