= Marilena Preda Sânc =

Feminist Artist

Marilena Preda Sânc (born April 17, 1955 in Bucharest) is a Romanian visual artist, art educator (current position – professor at National University of Arts, Bucharest, and author of feminism and Public Art writings. She is known for being one of the most active feminist artists in the country. She uses a multidisciplinary approach by employing various media such as drawing, painting, mural art, book-objects, video, performance, photography, and installation; her work has been shown in museums, galleries, conferences, symposium, and broadcast venues around the world.

Her career has spanned two eras in Romania: the social, cultural, and political restrictions of the Communist era, and the freedom of the post-revolution era which allowed her to expand her expression. Preda Sânc explor a variety of themes including feminism, gender identity, gender fusion, globalisation, self-exploration, and the interaction between public and private spaces.

== Education and work ==
Preda Sânc received her B.A. from the National University of Arts in Bucharest in 1980. She later received a Ph.D. in visual arts in 2002. Her early work in the 1980s was confined by the censorship regulations of the Communist government, but emphasised the exploration of the relationships between body and space (e.g. My Body is Space in Space, Time for Memory of All), and the expression of self-analysis. She states "I am concerned about the idea of the inner and outer landscape of the human body; about places for meditation thoughts and emotions, opening a path toward a deeper penetration of multiple layers of reality." Even though she faced restrictions, her art was still considered very experimental for the time, as seen in projects such as her intervention photographs and photo collages. After the 1989 revolution, Preda Sânc expanded her work to include a critical analysis of social and political norms in the country. This was because of the increased freedom for expression in the Eastern European art world as well as increased access to information from the Western world. During this time she also diversified her technique to include globe objects, video performances, and multimedia installations. Influenced by the war in Yugoslavia in 1999, she explored issues of globalisation and political and cultural conflict (e.g. Remapping the World). She also no longer was separated from the feminist movement and was one of the only Romanian artists that actually embraced this label.

== Role in feminism in Romania ==
Feminism in Romania did not take hold as it did in Western countries. During the Communist era, men and women in theory held equal positions, but in reality domestic work was still done primarily by women. Policies regarding reproduction also placed constraints on women's control over their sexual and reproductive life. After the revolution, women still experiences hardships, facing more difficulties finding work than men and receiving less pay. Although information access has increased in the country and there is more freedom to protest gender inequality, there is often a lack of interest in doing so. "The weak representation of feminist art in Romania is based on inconsistencies in information, prejudices, and negative value judgments: the majority of art training's interest is focused on making art as a means of expression without applying any serious gendered analysis" (Olivia Nitis). Wanda Mihuleac is considered to be the only artist pre-1990 to have any feminist approach in her work. After the revolution there were still very few to engage in this type of dialogue, even to the point of refusing to discuss what it was like being a woman in Romania during the Communist time. This is partly due to the negative connotation feminism has in the country and the idea that it lacks relevance in contemporary society. Marilena Preda Sânc is one of the only artists who embraces this term and addresses issues of gender inequality in her work. She uses her art related to feminism as a "self-referential statement," often incorporating themes related to body (e.g. Bodyscape, Handscape, Mindscape 1993). Preda Sânc sees social and political criticism as very personal, incorporating internal identity with external issues. One exhibition that she participated in that was related specifically to feminism was Perspectives in 2008. The project, organized by Olivia Nitis (curator, art critic, and feminist writer), was intended to "explore the cultural and historical differences between countries with no connection or with a direct and more appropriate connection to the waves and changes feminism has produced." One of Preda Sânc's works exhibited in this show was the photography/video installation Diva. In 2013, Good Girls.Memory, Desire, Power international exhibition happened at the National Museum of Contemporary Art in Bucharest. The project had three sections: "Memory", "Desire" and "Power", and was accompanied by an international symposium. Marilena Preda Sânc was its initiator and one of the sixty women artists exhibiting there. The show was initiated by Preda Sânc out of her "desire to set up in Bucharest a larger exhibition of women artists, preferably of those who decided, like herself, to take a feminist position." (Bojana PEJIĆ)

== Museum holdings ==
- MNAC (The National Museum of Contemporary Art) Bucharest (feminist work)
- Art Museums Oradea; Engraving Museu;, Bistriţa, Graphic Museum Tulcea
- Arhitekturni Muzej Ljubljana, Group Junij Collection, Lujljana (My Body is Space in Space, Time for Memory of All)
- Albertina Art Collections, Vienna, Austria
- Kunsthalle, Nuremberg
- Centro d’Arte Spaziotempo Firenze
- St. Stephen King Museum (artist book Body+Sound)
- Art Center Hugo Voeten, Belgium
- Art works in private collection: Austria, Belgium Bulgary, Canada, England, France, Germany, Greece, Holland, Hungary, Italy, Spain, Slovenia, U.S.A., South Korea, India, Denmark.

== Awards and grants ==
- 2017 Diploma for Gallery Eastward Prospectus with solo exhibition Marilena Preda Sanc – Artissima / Back to the Future
- 2010 Diploma of Excellence, Faculty of Arts and Design, Timișoara, Romania
- 2008 Prize for painting "Mihail Grecu" UAP Moldova, Chisinau
- 2004 Ordinul Meritul Cultural, Romania
- 1998 Arts link, fellowship, New York (Franklin Furnace's Program)
- 1997 KulturKontakt, artist in residence, Vienna, Austria
- 1996 Habitat the III-rd prize for painting, national competition organized by U.N.D.P., Bucharest 1993
- Diploma Amici del Pomero, (RHO) Milan, Italy
- 1988 International JUNIJ Group selection (prize for the best group exhibition – Photo Moon in Paris)
- 1983, 1986 Medaglia Amici del Pomero, (RHO) Milan, Italy
- 1986 Art Camp for painters Kazanluk
- 1982 Studio 35 Prize of Painting, Bucharest, Romania
- 1979 Scholarship of Merit, University of Arts, Bucharest, Romania

== Most recent solo exhibitions – feminist themes ==
- 2014 Crossing Worlds, FIVE PLUS Art Gallery Vienna (curator Olivia Niţiş)
- 2012 Mecanismele Imaginii / Image Machinery Contemporary Art Gallery of the National Brukenthal National Museum, Sibiu (curator Liviana Dan)
- 2011 Utopii Cotidiene / Crossing Self Histories 1981–2011 – intermedia exhibition, (MNAC), National Museum of Contemporary Art, Bucharest
- 2010 La Ciudad, paintings – video, Romanian Embassy Art Gallery from Madrid, Spain
- 2008 Bucharest-Budapest Bridge Contemporary Romanian and Hungarian Arts - The Gabor Hunya Collection (El Kazovszkij, Marilena Preda Sanc),
- Hungarian Cultural Centre, Bucharest
- 2007Urbanscape / Flying soul / Globalization, intermedia exhibition, Studio D.V.O.
- Gallery, Brussels
- Geografia intima / global – videoarte y arte digital, ICR, Madrid

== Most recent group exhibitions – feminist themes ==
- 2017 Dans la peau de la peau@ssie, Galeria Rue Francaise by MissChina, Paris, France Seeing Ourselves Sensing, East Wards Prospectus Gallery, Bucharest, Romania 2016 Istorii Monu-Mentale, Art Cub Gabroveni, Bucharest, Romania (curator Olivia Niţiş)
- 2015 From Afirmation to Contestation – Public Art Practices, MNAC, Bucharest, Romania (curator Judith Balko)
- Trans – Insurrection Poetique, Galerie Rue Francaise by Miss China, Paris, France
- Bon Appetite, performance, live net-cast, Galerie Rue Francaise by Miss China, Paris, France
- 2014 3rd European International Book Art Biennale (EIBAB), Russian State Art Library, Moscow, Russia. Author & curator Dorothea Fleiss and curator Mikhail Pogarsky
- Momentum 2, Aiurart Contemporary Art Space, Bucharest, Romania (curator Olivia Niţiş)
- Femart – Nihil sine UNA dea, CAV, București (curator Reka Csapo)
- 2013 Good Girls Memory Desire Power, MNAC, Bucharest, Romania (curators Bojana Pejic, Olivia Niţiş)
- Video Art International Festival, Camaguey (curator Olivia Niţiş) Momentum, Aiurart Gallery, București, Romania (curator Olivia Niţiş) 2012 20 Years:KKA Artists in Residence, KulturKontakt, Viena, Austria
- Body World – Traveling the Distance between Subject and Object, Victoria Art Center, Bucharest, Romania (curator Petru Lucaci)
- Femart, CAV, Bucharest, Romania (curators: Romana Mateiași, Bety Vervega, Emilia Persu, Marilena Preda Sânc)

== Most recent video work – feminist themes ==
- 2016 Closed Circuit, video 3 min
- 2015 Bon Appetite, performance, live net-cast, Galerie Rue Francaise by Miss China, Paris, France
- 2014 Local Policy ’Patriarchy’, video performance 2 min.24 sec.
- 2012 The Fist, video clip, 1 min
- 2010 Daily DIVA, video film, 4 min
- 2008 DIVA, video performance, 4 min

== Selection of publications/symposiums/ writings by Marilena Preda Sânc ==
- "Eco-feminist Art" in catalog Good Girls, Ed. ICR, 2016, p. 27-28
- My Body is Space in Space, Time for Memory of All in Arta magazine, "Feminisme", Nr. 11 / 2014, ISSN 0004-3354, imagini p. 36-37
- Romanian Women Artists in Art in Public Space - Feminism and Culture symposium. Relevance and Perspectives in Art History and Cultural Analysis, The Institute of Art History, Bucharest, 11.27.2009
- Femartworks, Editura UNARTE, București, CD-Rom interactive, ISBN 978-973-88431-5-8
- Art in the Public Space symposium – World Trade Center, Bucharest, Romania
- Eco-feminist Art – Contrapunct magazine, no. 2–4, 2002, pp. 24–26
- Other March – The Women's Role in Transgression of Ethnic Borders, Editura Desire Foundation, Cluj, 2001, curator Enikõ Magyari-Vincze, pp. 9.
- The Romanian Woman Ecofeminist Art, Dubrovnik, Croatia, 2000
- "Starost", "Oldness", in Stereo-Tip, editors Helena Pivec, Lilijana Stepnčič and Mestna galerija Ljubjana, 1995, pp. 62–63, 83.
- 1986 "Crochiul Minţii" – artist book (poem and screen printing), limited edition, run of 15

== Selected bibliography ==
- "Artissima Back to the Future" – Anna Daneri , 2017 Torino, p. 88-89
- FemLink-Art, Ed. Escourbiac, France, 2015, pp. 31, 60, 81
- ( ISBN 978-2-9553761-0-2)
- Material Histories Feminism and Feminist Art in Post- Revolutionary Romania - Olivia Niţiş, published in Gender Check: READER – Art and Theory in Eastern Europe, edited by Bojana Pejic & Erste Foundation & Museum Moderne KunstStiftung Ludwig Wien, pp. 351–361.
- "Globalization. The Window with Memories" – Olivia Niţiş, GEGENUBERSTELLUNG Brucke Zwischen Sichtbarem und Unsichtbarem exhibition catalog, Ed. Schnell+Steiner, editor Maria Baumann, Regensburg, 2014, ISBN 978-3-7954-2895-2, pp 72–73
- "Eu, En, Ich II" - Laura Grunberg, Arta magazine, Feminisme, Nr. 11 / 2014, ISSN 0004-3354, text, imagine p. 23
- Sinteze Contemporane. Corpul în Arta Balcanică / Contemporary Syntheses. The Body in the Balkan Art, Alexandra Titu, Constantin Prut, Editura BrumaR, Timişoara, ISBN 978-973-602-851-9, p. 12, 110-111
- Artele plastice în România 1945- 1989 cu o adendă 1990–2010, Magda Carneci, Publisher Polirom, Colecţia de Artă, Bucharest, 2013, ISBN 978-973-46-3445-3, p. 125, 131-132
- Marilena Preda Sânc la MNAC - Magda Predescu, Arta magazine Optzecismul vizual după 20 de ani / The 1980s Generation in the Visual Arts Twenty Years Later, no. 4–5, 2012, Ed. Uniunea Artiştilor Plastici din România, ISSN 0004-3354, p. 110
