= Mogok Pauk Pauk =

- မိုးကုတ်ပေါက်ပေါက်
- Born: 1977 (age 48–49); Mogok, Mandalay Region, Burma
- Other names: Chic Pauk, FGM Fairy-God Mother
- Occupation: Fashion designer

Mogok Pauk Pauk (Burmese: မိုးကုတ်ပေါက်ပေါက်) is a Burmese fashion designer and vice-chair of the Fashion Designers Entrepreneur Association. She has been dubbed as "Myanmar's Fashion Guru" for extraordinary fashion creatives and two decades-long experience in the Myanmar fashion industry.

== Early life ==
Pauk Pauk grew up in Mogok, Mandalay Region, Myanmar. Even though Mogok Pauk Pauk was born a boy, she loved to dress up in clothes for girls and wear makeup and she helped her mother with the family hairdressing business. She became the target of scorn and bullying because of her feminine interests.

== Career ==
In 1968, aged 15, she started as a makeup artist. She was aged 16, she straight out of school and dedicated herself to her work full-time. She was already a very sought after makeup artist for brides and traditional dancers in Mandalay and Mogok. At the age of 17, she was beginning to live as a woman and develop a philosophy that could counter any hate for the LGBT community. In 1988, she moved to Yangon from her hometown Mogok to work in the movie industry with her teacher Sandy, a costumier for actress Moht Moht Myint Aung. That's where she learned tailoring. Between Yangon and Mogok, she dedicated her time to both makeup and dressmaking, especially for brides. She has flourished as a fashion designer since 2000.

In 2006, she moved to Milan, Italy to attend design classes at the Burgo Fashion and Design Institute. In Milan, she developed her talent as a fashion designer and After 18 months she returned to her homeland, her creations started to attract attention. and confecting traditional robes, gowns and evening dress for actresses, jewellery models, cosmetics fairs and magazine photo shoots.

In 2011, she has specialised in fashion design. Under the brand "Mogok Pauk Pauk: Haute Couture", she produces Myanmar traditional wedding dresses, gowns, evening wear and cocktail wear. In 2013, she launched the ready-to-wear brand Chic Pauk, which continues to thrive in its niche market.

She participated as a judge in Style Secret and The Model Academy, the first reality TV show about grooming a supermodel in Myanmar. She believes in supporting other young designers, so she has created a scholarship which is promoting new talent. She will soon open Design House, a work space and showcase for her silk and acheik designs.
