= Gianina Șerban =

Romanian politician (born 1983)

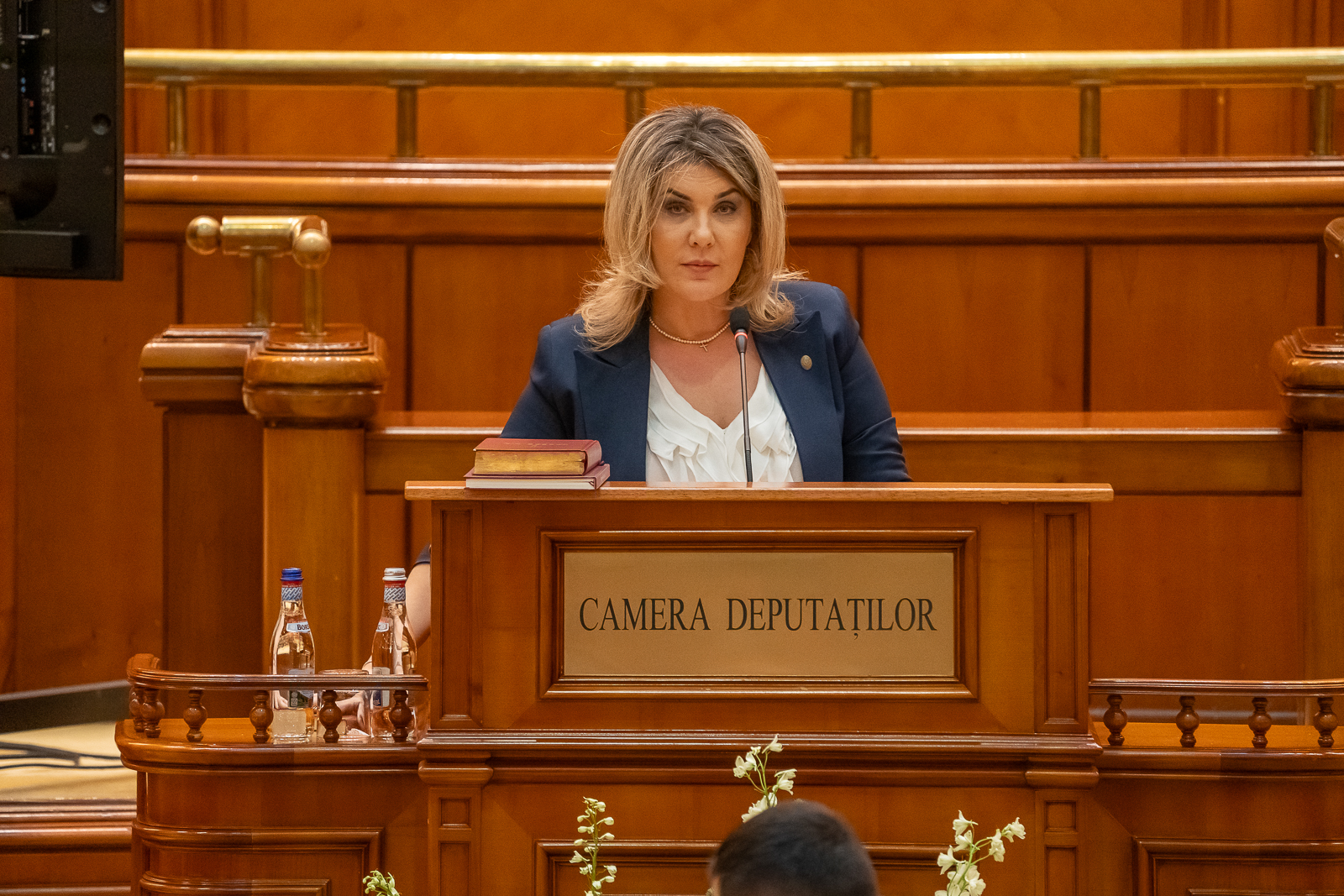
- Gianina Șerban taking the oath of office in the Chamber of Deputies, 21 December 2024

Member of the Chamber of Deputies
- Incumbent
- Assumed office 21 December 2020
- Constituency: Ilfov County

Personal details
- Born: 15 July 1983 (age 43) Bacău, Socialist Republic of Romania
- Party: Alliance for the Union of Romanians
- Education: Titu Maiorescu University

Gianina Șerban (born 15 July 1983, Bacău) is a Romanian politician who since 2020 has served a member of the Chamber of Deputies for the Alliance for the Union of Romanians.

== Early life ==
Gianina Șerban was born on 15 July 1983 in Bacău, the capital of Bacău County, in the Socialist Republic of Romania. In 2005, she graduated from the Faculty of Law at the private Titu Maiorescu University in Bucharest, the capital of Romania.

== Political career ==
=== First term (2020‒2024) ===
In the 2020 Romania parliamentary election on 6 December, Șerban was elected a member of the Champer of Deputies for Alliance for the Union of Romanians (AUR) in Ilfov County, taking office on 21 December. As of March 2024, Șerban served as a member of the AUR's National Leadership Bureau, being among of the party's six highest-ranking women. In September 2024, she was appointed as Secretary of the Chamber of Deputies.

=== Second term (2024‒present) ===
In the 2024 parliamentary election on 1 December, Șerban was reelected to the Chamber of Deputies in the same constituency as previously. In April 2025, she voiced against sex education as school curriculum.
