= George Bălăiță =

Romanian novelist

George Bălăiți
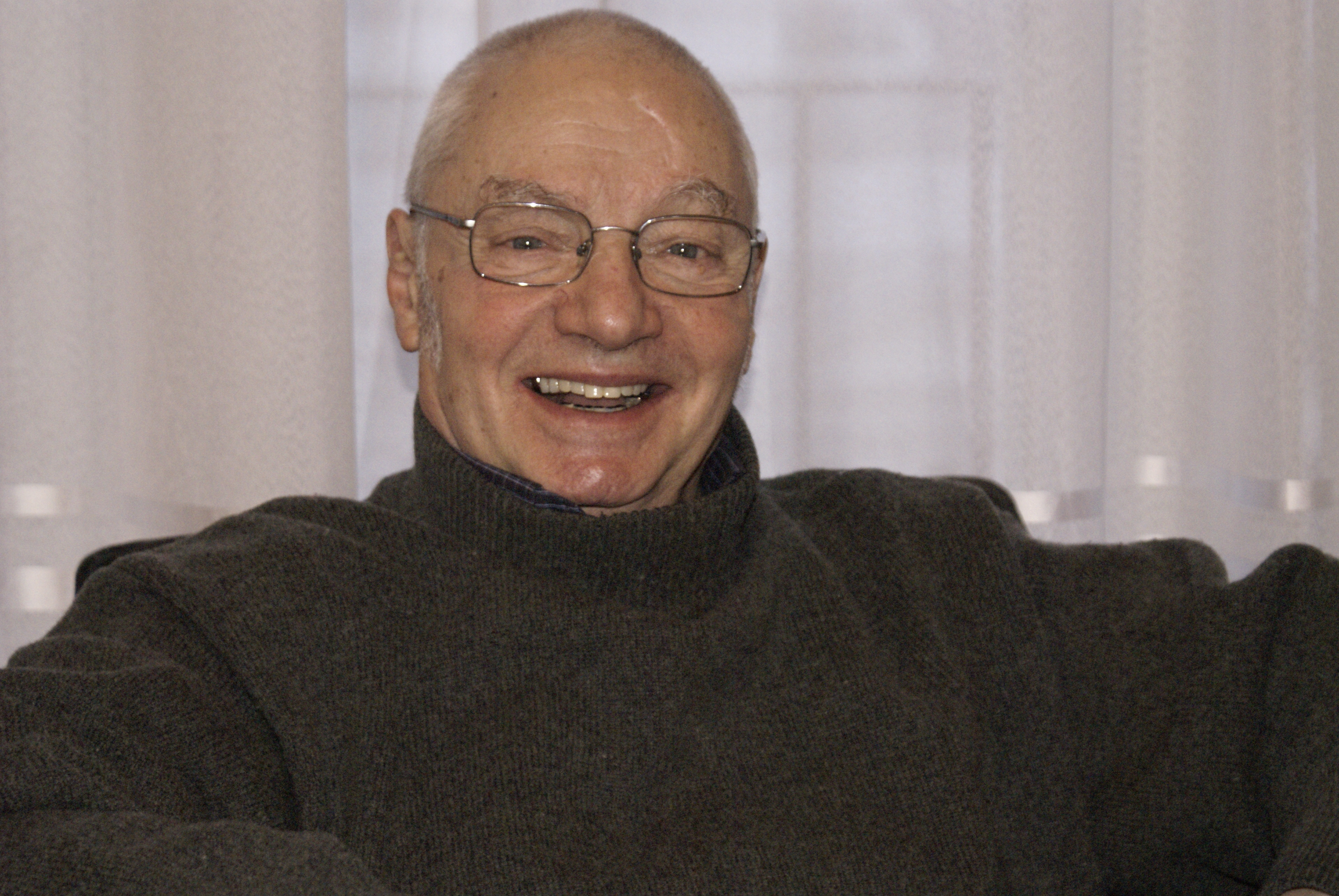
- George Bălăiță in 2010.
- Born: BĂLĂIȚI GHEORGHE; 17 April 1935; Bacău, Romania
- Died: 16 April 2017 (aged 81); Bucharest, Romania
- Resting place: Bellu Cemetery
- Occupation: Novelist

George Bălăiță (Romanian pronunciation: [ˈdʒe̯ordʒe bələˈitsə]; 17 April 1935 in Bacău – 16 April 2017 in Bucharest) was a Romanian novelist.

== Biography ==
He attended the Institute of Physical Culture in Bucharest (1953-1955) and graduated from the Faculty of Philology in Iaşi (1967). He worked as a technical draftsman, substitute teacher and methodologist instructor. He made his publishing debut in the magazine "Luceafărul" (1960).

== Awards ==
National Order "Star of Romania" in the rank of Knight (December 1, 2000) "for outstanding artistic achievements and for the promotion of culture, on the National Day of Romania"
