= Binu Bairam =

Romanian footballer

Personal information
- Full name: Robert Bairam Mihalache
- Date of birth: 19 November 2000 (age 25)
- Place of birth: San Cristóbal de La Laguna, Spain
- Height: 1.71 m (5 ft 7 in)
- Position: Right-back

Team information
- Current team: Torrent
- Number: 20

Youth career
- –2013: CDF Helmántico
- 2013–2015: Real Madrid
- 2015–2017: Villarreal
- 2017–2018: Roda
- 2018–2020: Villarreal

Senior career*
Years	Team	Apps	(Gls)
2020–2021	Villarreal C	26	(0)
2021–2022	Intercity	14	(0)
2022–2023	Santa Lucia	25	(1)
2023–2024	Hibernians	21	(0)
2024–2025	Atzeneta	29	(0)
2025–2026	Castellonense	24	(2)
2026–	Torrent	0	(0)
- * Club domestic league appearances and goals as of 9 May 2026

Binu Bairam (born 19 November 2000) is a Romanian footballer who plays as a right-back for Tercera Federación club Torrent.

== Honours ==
Intercity

- Segunda División RFEF: 2021–22

Castellonense

- Tercera Federación: 2025–26
