= Istituto di Moda Burgo =

Private fashion school in Milan, Italy

- Type: Private school
- Established: 1961
- Location: Milan, Italy; 45.4456°N 9.1744°E
- Campus: piazza San Babila, 5; 20122 Milan
- Website: imb.it
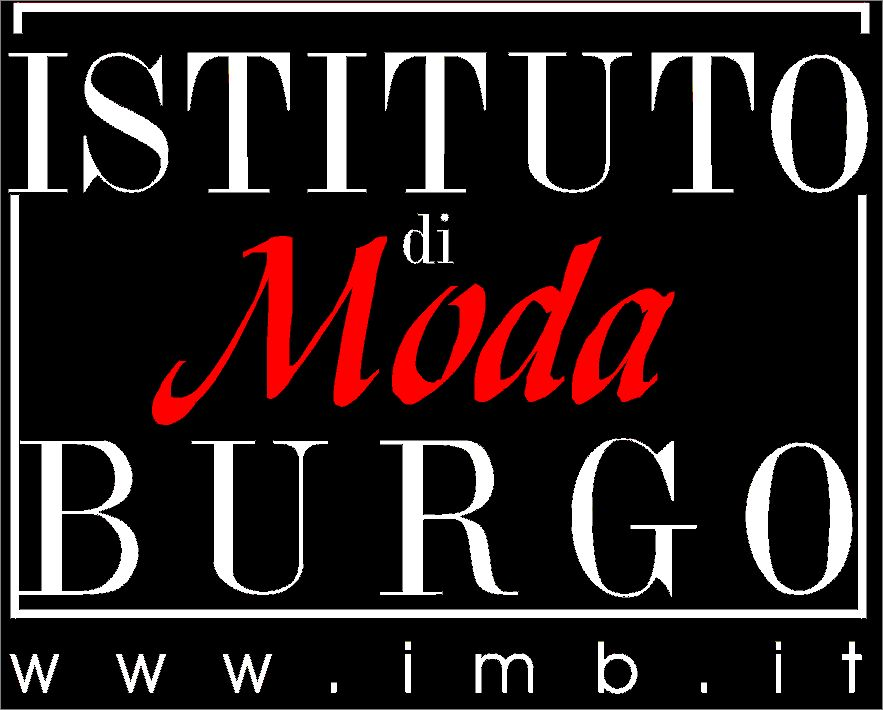

The Istituto di Moda Burgo is a private Italian school of fashion. It is based in Milan, in Lombardy in northern Italy, and has main branch in Rome.

== History ==
Istituto di Moda Burgo was founded in 1961 by Fernando Burgo, prominent Milan entrepreneur and writer, awarded with Milan Golden Medal.

It is established in Mexico, Qatar, USA, Canada, Greece, China, Malaysia, South Africa, Jordan, Armenia, Saudi Arabia, Peru, Egypt, Brazil, Turkey, Albania, Kosovo, Nigeria, Russia, Switzerland, Indonesia and can also count collaborations with public and private universities and fashion schools in countries such as Japan, China, Austria, Singapore, New Zealand.

In 2017 there were about 10,000 students of 50 nationalities in 23 campuses.

Inside the school there is a think tank about fashion world.

== Multi Cultural Events ==
Istituto di Moda Burgo tries to support multi cultural events. In 2019 it celebrates Qatar-India Year of Culture and explore the art of Mandala painting with a new series of workshops offered by Istituto di Moda Burgo Qatar at FBQ Museum.

== Accreditation ==
The Istituto di Moda Burgo is a private school of fashion It offers post-graduate and professional courses in fashion. It is listed by the Lombardy Region, among the institutions authorised to award degrees in fashion.

== Alumni ==
Alumni of the school include Mogok Pauk Pauk, probably the world's most visible transgender designer, Ali Charisma, Ntukokwu Obinna Samuel, Maureen Disini, Kristina Stets, Reni Smiths, Federico Pilia, and Jenny Yohana Kansil founder of IMB Indonesia.
