= Emanoil Bacaloglu =

Wallachian and Romanian mathematician, physicist and chemist

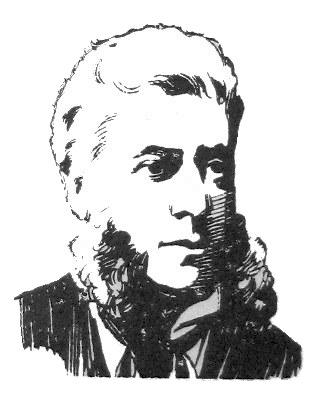
Emanoil Bacaloglu

Emanoil Bacaloglu (Romanian pronunciation: [emanoˈil bakaˈloɡlu]; 11 May [O.S. 29 April] 1830 – 30 August 1891) was a Wallachian and Romanian mathematician, physicist and chemist.

Born in Bucharest and of Greek origin, he studied physics and mathematics in Paris and Leipzig, later becoming a professor at the University of Bucharest and, in 1879, a member of the Romanian Academy. Considered to be the founder of many scientific and technological fields in Romania (and aiding in the creation of the Romanian Athenaeum), Bacaloglu was also an accomplished scientist. He helped create Romanian-language terminology in his fields and was one of the principal founders of the Society of Physical Sciences in 1890.

He was also a participant in the 1848 Wallachian revolution.

He is known for the "Bacaloglu pseudosphere". This is a surface of revolution for which the "Bacaloglu curvature" is constant.

== Main works ==
- Elemente de fizică, 2nd ed., București, (1888).
- Elemente de algebră, 2nd ed., București, (1870).
