= Leon Dănăilă =

Romanian neurosurgeon and former senator

Member of the Senate of Romania
- In office 20 December 2016 – 19 December 2020
- Constituency: Bucharest

Personal details
- Born: 1 July 1933 (age 93) Darabani, Kingdom of Romania
- Party: National Liberal Party
- Occupation: Neurosurgeon

Leon Dănăilă (born 1 July 1933) is a Romanian neurosurgeon and author. He is a prolific author and also a senator. Dănăilă was born in Darabani, in Botoșani County, Romania. He is a graduate of the Faculty of General Medicine of Iași, as well as the Faculty of Psychology and Philosophy of Bucharest. He was elected a titular member of the Romanian Academy in 2004. At the 2016 parliamentary election, he won a seat in the Romanian Senate for Bucharest representing the National Liberal Party.

== Education ==
Dănăilă worked for three years as a general practitioner with the sanitary district of Comănești and Dărmănești, in Bacău County. In 1961 he was appointed resident neurosurgeon at the Neurosurgery Clinic of Bucharest, where he has remained. He completed his specialty residency in 1966 and became a Doctor of Medicine - PhD - in 1973. In 1981 he was named a Senior Physician, 2nd degree, and became head of the Vascular Neurosurgery Department VII. In 1991, he was named Professor of Neurosurgery at the University of Medicine and Pharmacy Bucharest and Professor of Psychoneurology at the Titu Maiorescu University of Bucharest.

Dănăilă serves on the teaching board of the Faculty of Medicine at Bucharest, appointed in 1992. He has also been head of the Neurosurgery Department of that institution since 1996, in addition to President of the Romanian Neurosurgery Society since 1997. In 1980, Dănăilă was granted a Fulbright Scholarship, enabling him to work at the neurosurgery clinic of the University Hospital of New York. In July 1981 he travelled to the Netherlands for specialized studies in vascular neurosurgery and attended the Burdenke Neurosurgery Institute in Moscow.

== Surgical career ==
Following his travels, Dănăilă was able to perform the most complex of neurosurgical operations, including occlusion of aneurysm of the arterial vertebro-basilar system, ablation of the third ventricle tumors, surgical management of skull base tumors, carotidian and middle cerebral endarterectomy, and extra- and intracranial anastomosis. He also succeeded in reducing operation mortality from operations to percentages comparable with those reported by the world's most reputable neurosurgical clinics. Thus the surgical mortality rate in Bucharest fell from 50% to 2-6% for acoustic nerve neuroma and from 49% to 3% for intracerebral aneurysm cases. These reductions were aided by the endowment of the operating theatre with a surgical microscope and laser. Up to the present, he had performed more than 40,200 surgical interventions, out of which 21,779 using the operation microscope, 729 through the use of laser and 18,421 classic, without microscope and without laser.

== Works ==
Out of the total of 59 published books, he had been the sole author of 7 books, the primary author of 28 books, joint author, but not primary one, of 19 books, and contributing author in 3 books. Out of the 54 published books, textbooks and atlases,24 had been drawn up in English. He had published and had presented 404 scientific papers, as follows: 140 published abroad and in Romanian journals with international circulation(in English); 63 published in Romanian in various Romanian medical journals; 71 communicated to various international congresses, and 129 communicated to symposia and congresses in. His works are quoted by renowned scholars and researchers throughout the world.
