= Teodor Brateș =

Romanian journalist

Teodor Brateş
- Born: Froim Bernard; 5 March 1933 (age 93); Bucharest
- Education: A. A. Jdanov Upper School of Social Sciences
- Political party: PCR

Teodor Brateş (born Froim Bernard on 5 March 1933 in Bucharest) is a Romanian former radio (1949–1953, 1956–1958) and television journalist (1965–1990). He is best known for his role in the broadcasts during the Romanian Revolution.

== Career ==
He began work in 1947 as a mechanical assistant in Bucharest's "23 August" factories.

=== Radio ===
In 1949, he became an editor at the Romanian Radio Broadcasting Company. He attended the A. A. Jdanov Upper School of Social Sciences from 1953 to 1956, and on graduating was rehired at Romanian Radio. They dismissed him in 1958 upon learning that his stepfather had been arrested in 1947 and Brateş had not disclosed that information.

He received the Order of Labour on 30 December 1957, "the occasion of the 10th anniversary of the proclamation of the Romanian People's Republic, for outstanding merits in work".

After his dismissal, Brateş worked in the "9 May" workshops for a year before transferring to the National Council of Trade Unions, where he served as editor-in-chief for the factory newspaper.

=== Television ===
In 1965, Brateş began work as an editor with Romanian Public Television, completing his education by correspondence. He graduated in 1967, and became the assistant chief editor of the news department in 1969. He did not earn his journalist's certification until 1976.

He stayed on air for nearly 70 hours during the December 1989 Revolution, from the 22nd through the 24th. He was also the one who announced Nicolae Ceaușescu's arrest on 25 December.

== Indictment ==
On 18 April 2018, the General Prosecutor's Office indicted Brateș on charges of crimes against humanity, claiming that he was the main disseminator of fake news between 22–31 December 1989. The case against him was closed in 2019.

== Political affiliation ==
Brateş joined the Romanian Communist Party in 1955 as Froim Bernard. Of Jewish descent, he changed his name to Teodor Brateş in 1956.

== Works ==
- Teodor Brateş, Explozia unei clipe. O zi in studioul 4 (English: "The Explosion of Moments, a Day in Studio 4"), 22 December 1989 (Bucuresti, Scripta, 1992)
- Trilogia Revoluţiei Române în Direct (English: Trilogy of the Romanian Revolution), 3 volumes, 1500 pg., ed. Ager-Economistul, 2004.

== Sources ==
- Decretul Prezidiului Marii Adunări Naționale a Republicii Populare Romîne nr. 618 din 30 decembrie 1957 pentru conferirea titlului de "Artist emerit al Republicii Populare Romîne", a "Ordinului Muncii" și a "Medaliei Muncii", unor lucrători din domeniul radiodifuziunii [Decree of the Presidium of the Great National Assembly of the Socialist Republic of Romania no. 618 of December 30, 1957 for conferring the title of "Artist Emeritus of the Romanian People's Republic", the "Labor Order" and the "Labor Medal" to broadcasters] (Report) (in Romanian). Vol. 7. Great National Assembly of the Socialist Republic of Romania (published 15 January 1958). 30 December 1957. p. 39.
- Burl, Virgil (28 December 2014). "Cine este Teodor Brateș, personaj cheie al Revoluției din 1989 și ultimul mare propagandist al TVR" [Who is Teodor Brateș, key figure of the 1989 Revolution and TVR's last great propagandist]. evz.ro (in Romanian).
- Mirabela, Vlad (18 April 2018). "Crainicul Revoluției, Teodor Brateș, a fost pus sub acuzare" [Teodor Brateș, announcer of the revolution, indicted]. Huff.ro (in Romanian). Archived from the original on 22 August 2026.
- Pena, Cătălin (3 July 2019). "Dosarul de cadre al Crainicului Loviturii de Stat din 1989, comunistul Teodor Brateș, fost Froim Bernard. Documente" [The personnel file of communist Teodor Brateş, formerly Froim Bernard, 1989 coup d'etat announcer. Documents]. Evenimentul Istoric (in Romanian). Archived from the original on 22 August 2026.
- Rizea, Alexandra (18 April 2018). "Teodor Brateș, crainicul TVR de la Revoluție, este acuzat de Parchetul General că a comis infracțiuni contra umanității, prin difuzarea de "știri false, cu caracter diversionist"" [Prosecutor General's Office accuses former TVR announcer Teodor Brateș of crimes against humanity for broadcasting "fake news, of a diversionary nature"]. Active News (in Romanian). Archived from the original on 22 August 2026.
