= Claudiu Komartin =

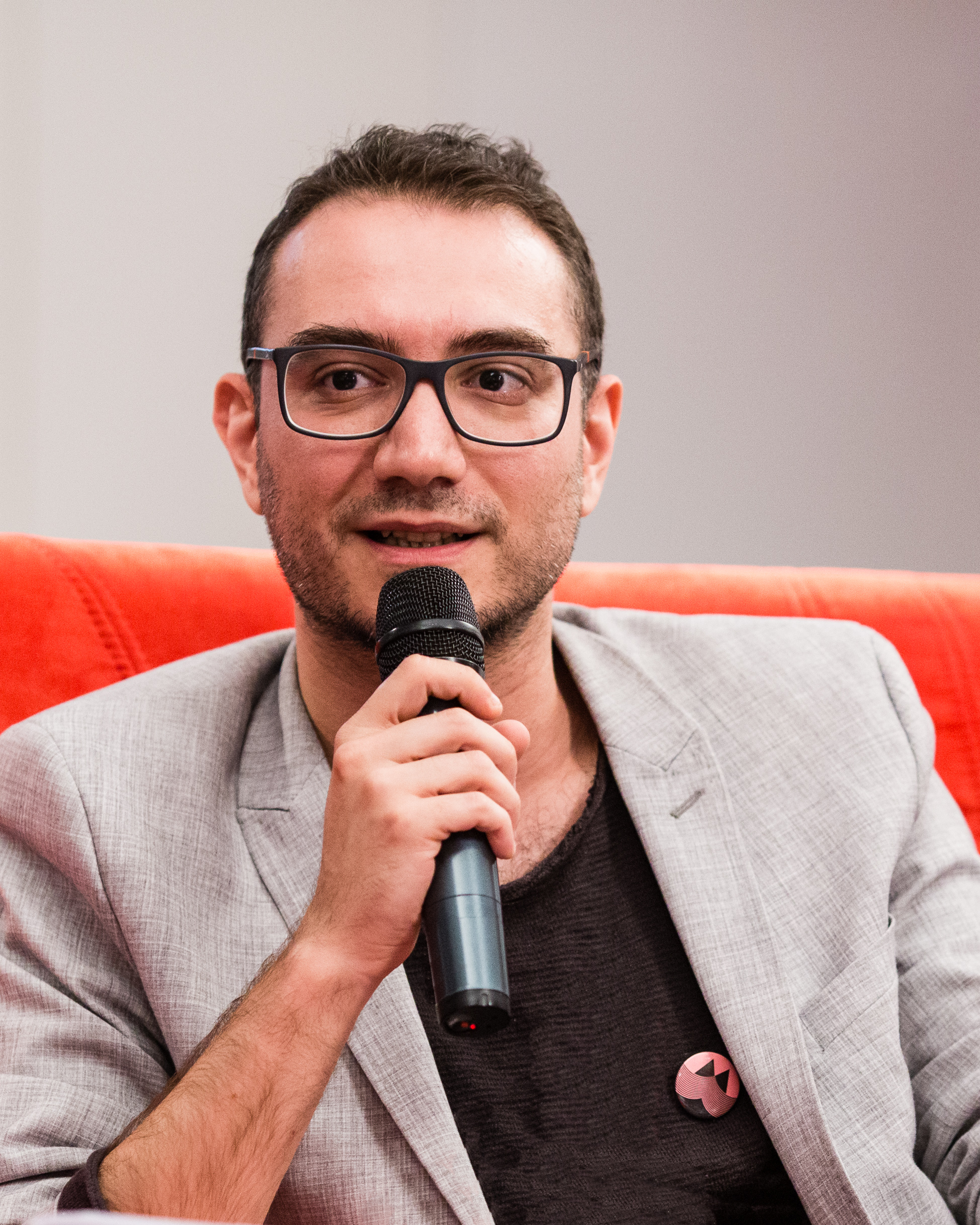
Komartin, Authors' Reading Month 2019, Wrocław (Poland)

Claudiu Komartin (1983, Bucharest) is a Romanian poet, translator and editor, considered to be one of the most important authors of his generation.

The first poetry book of Komartin, Păpușarul și alte insomnii, published in 2003, won the Mihai Eminescu National Prize. The second book, Circul domestic, won in 2007 the Romanian Academy Poetry Prize. In 2010, he initiated The Max Blecher Publishing House, an editorial project aimed at promotion of contemporary Romanian literature, relatively less-known outside of the country, as well as bringing underground Romanian authors closer to the public and eventually integrating them into mainstream literature. Since 2010, Komartin is the editor-in-chief of Poesis international, a literary magazine.

He also translated from French, English and Italian.

Komartin's poetry has been translated to a number of languages, including English, German, Bulgarian, Polish, Czech, Greek, Turkish, Serbian, Swedish and Spanish.

== Bibliography ==
- Păpușarul și alte insomnii (The Puppeteer & Other Insomnia), Editura Vinea, Bucharest, 2003
- Circul domestic (Domestic Circus), Editura Cartea Romanească, Bucharest, 2005
- Un anotimp în Berceni (A Season in Berceni), Editura Cartier, Chișinău, 2009
- cobalt (cobalt), Casa de Editură Max Blecher, Bistrița, 2013
- Maeștrii une arte muribunde. Poeme 2010-2017 (Masters of a Dying Art. Poems 2010-2017), Editura Cartier, Chișinău, 2017
- Autoportret în flama de sudură (Self-Portrait in the Welding Flame), Casa de Editură Max Blecher, Bistrița, 2021
- Inoculare (Inoculation), Editura Cartier, Chișinău, 2022
- În vortex (In the Vortex), Casa de Editură Max Blecher, Bistrița, 2026
