= George Coandă =

Romanian writer and historian

George Coandă (Romanian pronunciation: [ˈdʒe̯ordʒe ˈko̯andə]; born 12 October 1937), is a Romanian historian, novelist, poet and literary critic, historian of culture and journalist. From Şimian, Bihor, Coandă is the founder of the Valahia University of Târgoviște.

== Works ==
- 1974 Univers liber
- 1980 Secunda în plus
- 1985 Spaţii de suflet
- 1989 Eternele columne
- 1996 O cetate, o patrie
- 1997 O mie nouăsute nouăzeci şi şapte după Hristos
- 1998 Cabinetul cu stampe
- 2000 Clipa şi istoria. Târgovişte
- 2002 Spaţiu istoric românesc. Imagini geopolitice şi de geocivilizaţie
- 2002 Geocivilizaţie românească
- 2002 Valahia. Istoria unei universităţi
- 2003 Carpaţii – spaţiu de conservare şi continuitate a vetrei etnice româneşti
- 2003 Oarecum
- 2004 Arheologia viitorului. Cei ce ne privesc din stele Târgovişte
- 2005 Cosmopoetica Târgovişte
- 2005 Istoria Târgoviştei. Cronologie enciclopedică
- 2006 Mic tratat de politologie reflexivă
- 2006 Ambasador la Ecuator sau Drumul unei vieţi de la marxism la gândirea liberă. Nicolae Tăbârcă în dialog cu George Coandă
- 2006 Destinul românilor pe Golgota istorie Târgovişte
- 2006 O istorie geopolitică şi a geocivilizaţiei românilor
