= Gheorghe Moroșanu =

Romanian mathematician (born 1950)

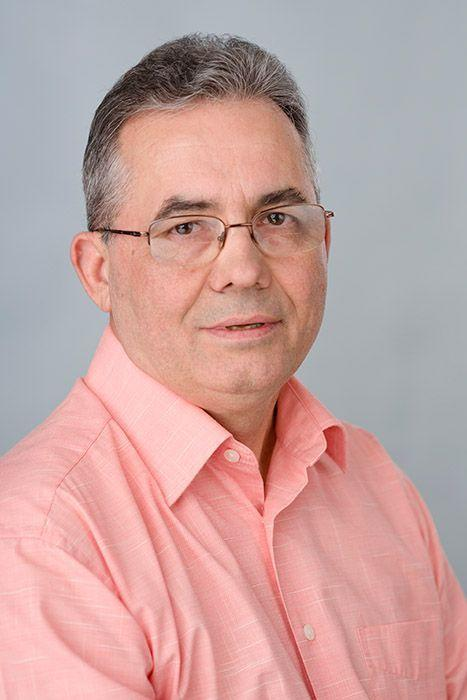
- Gheorghe Moroșanu (2013)
- Born: April 30, 1950 (age 76); Darabani, Botoșani County, Romania
- Education: Alexandru Ioan Cuza University, Iași, Romania
- Known for: his publications in Ordinary Differential Equations, Partial Differential Equations, Nonlinear Analysis, Calculus of Variations, Fluid Mechanics, Asymptotic Analysis, Applied Mathematics
- Awards: Nicolae Teodorescu Prize of the Academy of Romanian Scientists (2021); Professor Honoris Causa of the Babeș-Bolyai University (2019); Doctor Honoris Causa of the University of Craiova (2017); Doctor Honoris Causa of the Ovidius University, Constanța, Romania (2016); Egyetemi Tanár (University Professor), appointed by the President of Hungary (2008); Distinguished Assistant Professor, Ministry of Education, Romania (1985); Gheorghe Lazăr Prize of the Romanian Academy (1983)
- Scientific career
- Fields: Mathematics
- Workplaces: Babeș-Bolyai University, Cluj-Napoca, Romania (since 2020); Central European University, Budapest (2002-2020); Stuttgart University (2001-2002); Alexandru Ioan Cuza Univ., Iași, Romania (1977-2001)
- Doctoral advisors: Adolf Haimovici; Haïm Brézis; Viorel Barbu

Gheorghe Moroșanu (born April 30, 1950, in Darabani, Botoșani County, Romania) is a Romanian mathematician known for his publications in Ordinary Differential Equations, Partial Differential Equations, Nonlinear Analysis, Calculus of Variations, Fluid Mechanics, Asymptotic Analysis, Applied Mathematics. He earned his Ph.D. in 1981 from the Alexandru Ioan Cuza University in Iași, Romania.

He is currently affiliated with the Babeș-Bolyai University in Cluj-Napoca, Romania. Between 2002 and 2020 he was a professor at the Central European University in Budapest (an international English-language university, accredited in the USA), after previously holding positions at the University of Stuttgart and Alexandru Ioan Cuza University of Iași, Romania.

Among several administrative positions, he served as chairman of the Mathematics Department of the Central European University in Budapest since 2004 to 2012. In 2008 he was appointed as egyetemi tanár (the highest academic title in Hungarian higher education) by the President of Hungary.

Before his university studies, during the 12-year period of education from primary to high school (1957–1969), Gheorghe Moroșanu was at the top of his class each academic year and demonstrated a keen interest in mathematics.

In 1969 he started studying mathematics at the Alexandru Ioan Cuza University of Iaşi. He was the first to earn a Ph.D. of his class of over 150 graduates. His PhD thesis, entitled Qualitative Problems for Nonlinear Differential Equations of Accretive Type in Banach Spaces, included original results published in top-ranked journals, such as Atti della Accademia Nazionale dei Lincei, Journal of Differential Equations, Journal of Mathematical Analysis and Applications, Nonlinear Analysis, Numerical Functional Analysis and Optimization. In particular, Gheorghe Moroșanu solved in his thesis the problem of the existence and uniqueness of the solution of a hyperbolic differential system with some nonlocal boundary conditions, thus correcting a paper by Viorel Barbu and Ioan I. Vrabie, which actually does not cover the case of nonlocal boundary conditions, in contrast to what those authors asserted.

Gheorghe Moroșanu is the author and co-author of a large number of research articles and several books (monographs and textbooks).

His monograph on nonlinear evolution equations is mainly focused on the stability theory for such equations. In the preface of this monograph, Professor Michiel Hazewinkel (Series Editor) states that

the theory of stability of ordinary differential equations contains the germs for a theory of stability of nonlinear evolution semigroups ... This book is devoted to a self-contained systematic exposition of these matters and incorporates many of the author's own substantial results in the field.

This book has been followed by a series of related papers, including his articles on second-order evolution equations governed by monotone operators. These publications provide a complete answer to the long-standing existence question in the non-homogeneous case.

Both his joint monograph on functional methods and that on singular perturbations contain original material mostly due to the authors, bringing new ideas and methods that are useful in exploring mathematical models described by linear and nonlinear differential equations. In particular the book on singular perturbations combines results from different parts of mathematics to offer a detailed asymptotic analysis of some important classes of singularly perturbed boundary value problems which are mathematical models for various phenomena in biology, chemistry, engineering. This book has been followed by some related joint papers on abstract semilinear and fully nonlinear evolution equations with significant applications.

In 2019, he published a book on functional analysis, which consists of a mixture of standard functional analysis tools and real world problems.

Gheorghe Moroșanu has also works in Calculus of Variations, Fluid Mechanics, etc. More specifically, his legacy of contributions concerns (but is not limited to) the following topics:

- first and second-order evolution equations in Hilbert spaces;
- initial-boundary value problems for parabolic and hyperbolic partial differential equations and systems (existence, high regularity, stability of solutions, time periodic solutions);
- singular perturbation theory for nonlinear partial differential equations and semilinear evolution equations in Hilbert spaces;
- boundary value problems for elliptic equations, including equations involving p-Laplacians, related eigenvalue problems;
- nonlinear ordinary differential equations, integro-differential equations, delay differential equations, equations involving ordinary p-Laplacians;
- monotone operators, nonlinear differential operators;
- difference equations in Hilbert spaces, including proximal point algorithms;
- the Fourier method for solving abstract evolution equations;
- optimization, input identifiability, optimal control;
- applications in acoustics, capillarity theory, diffusion processes, fluid flows, hydraulics, integrated circuits, mathematical biology and ecology, nonlinear oscillators, phase field equations, self-organized systems, telegraph systems, etc.

In 1983 he was awarded the Gheorghe Lazăr Prize of the Romanian Academy in recognition of his outstanding contributions to the theory of hyperbolic partial differential equations. For the book of functional analysis mentioned above, Gheorghe Morosanu received in 2021 the Nicolae Teodorescu Prize from the Academy of Romanian Scientists.

He holds Honorary Doctorates from the University of Craiova, Romania and from the Ovidius University, Constanța, Romania. In 2019, he received the title of Professor Honoris Causa from the Babeș-Bolyai University, Cluj-Napoca, Romania

A school (in Darabani) Gheorghe Moroșanu himself attended between 1957 and 1965 has been named after him since 2007, when he also received the title of Honorary Citizen of Darabani in recognition of his accomplishments.

In 2020 he became a Corresponding Member of the Academy of Romanian Scientists, then Full Member in 2022.

In 2025 Gheorghe Moroșanu was awarded the title of Professor Emeritus of the Alexandru Ioan Cuza University of Iași, and in 2026 he became a Corresponding Member of the Accademia Peloritana dei Pericolanti, Messina, Italia.
