= Cristiana Dumitrache =

Romanian scientist

Cristiana Dumitrache (born 30/09/1998) is a Romanian scientist, head of the Astrophysical Institute at the Astronomical Observatory of the Romanian Academy.

== See also ==
- Eurasian Astronomical Society
