= Felix Aderca =

Romanian novelist and poet (1891–1962)

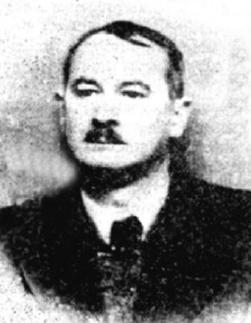
- Born: Froim-Zelig (Froim-Zeilic) Aderca; Zelicu Froim Adercu; March 13, 1891; Puiești, Kingdom of Romania
- Died: December 12, 1962 (aged 71); Bucharest, Romanian People's Republic
- Occupations: novelist, poet, dramatist, journalist, translator, literary critic, music critic, theater critic, civil servant, schoolteacher
- Writing career
- Pen name: A. Tutova, Clifford Moore, F. Lix, Leone Palmantini, Lix, Masca de catifea, Masca de fier, N. Popov, Oliver, Oliver Willy, Omul cu mască de mătase, W., Willy
- Period: 1910–1962
- Genres: adventure novel, aphorism, biographical novel, children's literature, erotic literature, essay, fantasy, historical novel, lyric poetry, novella, parable, post-apocalyptic fiction, psychological novel, reportage, satire, utopian and dystopian fiction
- Movements: Symbolism, Expressionism, Sburătorul

Felix Aderca (Romanian pronunciation: [ˈfeliks aˈderka]; born Froim-Zelig [Froim-Zeilic] Aderca; March 13, 1891 – December 12, 1962), also known as F. Aderca, Zelicu Froim Adercu or Froim Aderca, was a Romanian novelist, playwright, poet, journalist and critic, noted as a representative of rebellious modernism in the context of Romanian literature. As a member of the Sburătorul circle and close friend of its founder Eugen Lovinescu, Aderca promoted the ideas of literary innovation, cosmopolitanism and art for art's sake, reacting against the growth of traditionalist currents. His diverse works of fiction, noted as adaptations of Expressionist techniques over conventional narratives, range from psychological and biographical novels to pioneering fantasy and science fiction writings, and also include a sizable contribution to erotic literature.

Aderca's open rejection of tradition, his socialism and pacifism, and his exploration of controversial subjects resulted in several scandals, making him a main target of attacks from the far-right press of the interwar period. As a member of the Jewish-Romanian community and a vocal critic of antisemitism, the writer was persecuted by successive fascist regimes before and during World War II. He afterward resumed his activities as author and cultural promoter, but, having failed at fully adapting his style to the requirements set by the communist regime, lived his final years in obscurity.

Married to the poet and novelist Sanda Movilă, Aderca was also noted for his networking inside the interwar literary community, being the interviewer of other writers and the person behind several collective journalistic projects. Interest in the various aspects of his own literary contribution was rekindled in the late 20th and early 21st centuries.

== Biography ==
=== Early life and World War I ===
Froim Aderca hailed from the northwestern historical region of Moldavia, his native village being Puiești, Tutova County (now in Vaslui County). He was one of five children born to merchant Avram Adercu and his wife Debora Perlmutter, his family being in the minority group of Jews to whom Romania had granted political emancipation. Among his siblings were Leon and Victor, both of whom followed in their father's footsteps: the former became a shoe salesman in Milan, Italy, the latter an accountant in Israel.

After completing his primary education at the local school, Froim spent the remainder of his childhood years in the southwestern city of Craiova and in rural Oltenia. Avram set up a new business in partnership with the State Tobacco Monopoly, while Froim attended the Carol I High School. He was soon expelled from all state-funded lyceums, after his school-paper on the historical Jesus was deemed anti-Christian. Turning to literature, Froim pondered rallying with the traditionalist writers, who later became his ideological adversaries. The poems he sent to Sămănătorul magazine were sent back to him, but other pieces saw print in Sămănătorul's provincial satellite, Ramuri.

Befriending the Craiova publisher Ralian Samitca (whose brother, Ignat Samitca, was described as Aderca's first literary sponsor), Aderca published several other works in book format. In 1910, he issued the political essay Naționalism? Libertatea de a ucide ("Nationalism? The Freedom to Kill", published under the pen name Oliver Willy) and the first of his several collections of lyric poetry: Motive și simfonii ("Motifs and Symphonies"). In 1912, he followed up with four separate volumes of verse: Stihuri venerice ("Poems to Venus"), Fragmente ("Fragments"), Reverii sculptate ("Sculptured Reveries") and Prin lentile negre ("Through Black Lenses"). His works were by then featured in a more eclectic and influential venue, Bucharest's Noua Revistă Română. The cycle of poems which saw print in that venue, marking his official debut as 1913, are collectively known as Panteism ("Pantheism").

Having also made his debut in Romanian drama with the printed version of his "theatrical paradox" Antractul ("The Intermission"), Aderca left for France during the same year. He attempted to start a new life in Paris, but was unsuccessful and only one year later returned to his homeland. During this interval, in March 1914, Noua Revistă Română published one of his early critical essays, marking the start of Aderca's flirtations with Symbolism in general and the local Symbolist circles in particular: În marginea poeziei simboliste ("On Symbolist Poetry"). For a while, he was tasked with the magazine's literary column, and, in this context, began a publicized polemic with the traditionalist critic (and fellow emancipated Jew) Ion Trivale. Other texts he authored were published in Versuri și Proză, a periodical issued in Iași city, one most often associated with the last wave of Romanian Symbolism.

Having witnessed the outbreak of World War I even before Romania joined in, Aderca recorded his experience in the 1915 volume Sânge închegat... note de război ("Dried Blood... Notes from the War"). Much of his press activity comprised pacifist and socialist opinion pieces, in which he condemned in equal terms the Entente countries and Central Powers. For a while, he displayed a Germanophile bias, arguing that the Central Powers were the more progressive of two sides and even contributing, in 1915, to the Germanophile tribune Seara.

Nonetheless, Aderca was among the Jewish men drafted in the Romanian Army in the era before full emancipation, seeing action on the local theater and later serving in the war of 1919 against Soviet Hungary. His conduct under arms, deemed "heroic" by cultural historian Andrei Oișteanu, earned him a military decoration. As a civilian, Aderca was still close to the anti-Entente intellectual circles: during the separate peace interval of 1918, he contributed to A. de Herz's Germanophile newspaper Scena, but published only poetry and literary essays.

=== Sburătorist affiliation ===
After the war's end and the establishment of Greater Romania, Aderca returned to Craiova, where his wife Sanda Movilă (herself an aspiring writer, born Maria Ionescu in Argeș County) gave birth to their son Marcel in January 1920. Later that year, the family settled in Bucharest, where Aderca was appointed to a civil service office within the Ministry of Labor (an office he kept until 1940). He was collaborating with another poet, Benjamin Fondane, preparing lectures on various literary subjects to complement Fondane's projects for the stage.

In parallel, he carried on with his literary activity, publishing a large number of books in quick succession and, in some cases, with significant success among the Romanian public. His first novel, titled Domnișoara din Str. Neptun ("Little Miss on Neptune Street"), saw print in 1921, and marked Aderca's definitive break with traditionalism. It was followed by a long line of other novels and novellas: Țapul ("The Goat", 1921), later reissued as Mireasa multiplă ("The Multiple Bride") and as Zeul iubirii ("The God of Love"); Moartea unei republici roșii ("The Death of a Red Republic", 1924); Omul descompus ("The Decomposed Man", 1926); Femeia cu carne albă ("The White-fleshed Woman", 1927). A member of the Romanian Writers' Society, Aderca also made his debut as a translator from French, publishing a version of Henri Barbusse's Hell (1921). In 1922, he reissued Naționalism? Libertatea de a ucide as Personalitatea. Drepturile ei în artă și în viață ("The Personality. Its Rights on Art and Life", dedicated to philosopher and Noua Revistă Română founder Constantin Rădulescu-Motru), and put out the first section of a more theoretical writing, Idei și oameni ("Ideas and People").

Felix Aderca's new life in Bucharest brought his affiliation to the modernist circle and magazine Sburătorul. Reportedly, he was among the privileged members of this club—that is, those whose opinions were treasured by its leader Eugen Lovinescu; according to literary historian Ovid Crohmălniceanu, he assumed the task of popularizing the anti-traditionalist and Sburătorist ideology with an intensity matched only by critics Vladimir Streinu and Pompiliu Constantinescu. A similar verdict comes from one of Lovinescu's contemporaries and rivals, the literary historian George Călinescu: "[Aderca] was one of those with the courage of taking an immediate stance, to which the master of the house [Lovinescu] would subsequently add his signature and his seals". According to Marcel Aderca, it was Lovinescu who gave his father the first name Felix, although the writer himself continued to exclusively use the shortened signature F. Aderca. By 1927, the writer was also directly involved in publishing the eponymous tribune, serving as a member of its editorial board and contributing its regular book review column.

Increasingly, the relationships between the Sburătorists were transposed on a personal level: the owner of a Peugeot car, Aderca took his colleagues on weekend trips to Băneasa, or even into the Southern Carpathians. In the end, Aderca became what literary historian Ioana Pârvulescu describes as Lovinescu's "one true friend". Like other Sburătorists, he acted paternally toward his mentor's young daughter, Monica (herself known in later decades as a literary critic), and was present at her baptism. In June 1926, he even contributed to an anthology of poems written in her honor (Versuri pentru Monica, or "Verse for Monica").

In other contexts, the gatherings could highlight conflicts between the various members, Aderca and Lovinescu included. As literary chronicler, Aderca stood out for his negative comments on the novels of his Sburătorul colleague, Hortensia Papadat-Bengescu: while acknowledging her glimpses of literary greatness, he criticized the liberties she took with the Romanian language, and especially her barbarisms. Although he repeatedly stated his admiration for the maverick poet Al. T. Stamatiad (who clashed with Lovinescu during Sburătorul sessions), the two men quarreled over Aderca's admiration for Barbusse.

=== Independent modernist promoter ===
Aderca's own affiliation to the Sburătorul circle was loose and his interests more diverse than those of his mentor Lovinescu. Crohmălniceanu, who speaks of Aderca's "fertile agitation", also notes that Aderca divided himself among venues, breaking "countless lances in the name of modernism". Lovinescu himself, reflecting back on the period of Sburătorist beginnings, recalled that Aderca acted less as a critic, and more as a militant "theorist of [Aderca's] own aesthetics." Together with fellow Sburătorist poet Ion Barbu, but contrary to Lovinescu's tastes, Aderca was promoting modernism in the form of jazz music and jazz poetry: in 1921, together with Fondane and critic Tudor Vianu, they entertained an African American jazz singer named Miriam Barca, who was visiting Romania (the experience influenced some of Barbu's poetry). In 1922, he helped Fondane publish his collected essays, Imagini și cărți din Franța ("Images and Books from France"), with Editura Socec.

By this phase in his career, Aderca was establishing his reputation as a magazine columnist and theater chronicler, one particularly interested in the development of modernism in Weimar Germany and in Italy. His 1922 articles include an overview of Italian Futurism. Published in the Craiova-based journal Năzuința, it argued that the movement had set the stage for innovation not just in art, but also in everyday life and in politics. For a while in 1923, he tried his hand at publishing his own magazine, titled Spre Ziuă ("Toward Daylight").

In tandem, Aderca embarked on a collaboration with Contimporanul, a vocal modernist venue published by poet Ion Vinea. It hosted Aderca's 1923 opoen letter to Romania's theater professionals. Written as a comment to a German art manifesto (originally published by Friedrich Sternthal in Der Neue Merkur), it claimed that authors or directors unfamiliar with modern German drama could no longer be seen as competent or relevant in their field. In later years, Contimporanul, with its agenda set by Vinea's attack on institutionalized literary criticism, publicized a heated debate with Lovinescu and his group, leaving the undecided Aderca exposed to criticism from both sides. His contributions were hosted by several new magazines of the interwar, including Liviu Rebreanu's Mișcarea Literară, where, in 1925, Aderca notably published an introduction to the writings of German dramatist Georg Kaiser. This period witnessed the incorporation of Expressionism into his literary work, an early result of this being his 1923 text for the stage, Sburătorul (named, like the magazine, in reference to the Zburător myths in Romanian folklore). His growing sympathy for Expressionist drama, or "abstract theater", was also expressed in a set of articles for Rampa. Published from 1924 to 1925, these documented, alongside Aderca's admiration for the plays of Frank Wedekind, his appreciation for the Romanian Expressionists Lucian Blaga and Adrian Maniu. Aderca was also among those who saluted the Expressionist Vilna Troupe, giving his endorsement to their rendition of Nikolai Gogol's Marriage.

Other texts by Aderca saw print in Punct (a provincial satellite of Contimporanul, founded and edited by Scarlat Callimachi), and in Omul Liber daily, where, in 1923, he denounced novelist Cezar Petrescu for having plagiarized the writings of Guy de Maupassant. His ideas on Jewish community life saw print in Lumea Evree, a bimonthly put out by philosopher Iosif Brucăr. His other articles and various pieces were scattered throughout literary reviews: Viața Românească, Vremea, Ideea Europeană, Adevărul Literar și Artistic, Flacăra, Revista Fundațiilor Regale, Revista Literară and the literary supplement of Universul all featured his work. Researcher Dumitru Hîncu, who counts some 60 publications to have enlisted Aderca's contribution, also notes his collaboration with Îndreptarea, the press organ of Alexandru Averescu's People's Party. In addition to signing with his name or initials (capitalized or not), Aderca used a variety of pseudonyms, including Willy, W. and Oliver, A. Tutova, Clifford Moore, F. Lix, Lix, and N. Popov. He was also using the names Masca de fier ("The Iron Mask"), Masca de catifea ("The Velvet Mask") and Omul cu mască de mătase ("The Man with the Silk Mask").

His activities as a cultural promoter opened the way for the recognition of other Romanian modernists. According to Crohmălniceanu, Aderca's efforts were important in formally establishing the reputation of poets Tudor Arghezi (whom Aderca viewed as the greatest of his lifetime) and Barbu. In the early 1920s, Aderca had sporadically contributed to the magazine Cuget Românesc, where Arghezi was an editor. By 1928, he became co-editor of Arghezi's humorous sheet Bilete de Papagal, one of several Jewish Romanian writers who were among Arghezi's dedicated promoters. In parallel, his contribution as a protector of the Romanian avant-garde was being acknowledged by some of its members, and noted by the aspiring author Jacques G. Costin. Costin addressed him in 1932: "You are kind and you have much perspired for the great causes." Aderca's other activity, as a translator, produced versions of Romain Rolland's The Humble Life of the Hero and The Precursors (both 1924), as well as of texts by Stefan Zweig (1926). He also translated Karel Čapek's R. U. R. (1926), and Barbusse's Under Fire (1935).

=== Early 1930s ===
Aderca's advocacy of Lovinescu's ideas, with its critique of didacticism and political command in art, was the connecting element of the essays he published in 1929: Mic tratat de estetică sau lumea văzută estetic ("A Concise Tract on Aesthetics or The World Seen in Aesthetic Terms"). Also that year, Aderca compiled interviews with literary figures, intellectuals and artists, under the title Mărturia unei generații ("A Generation's Testimony"). The book, illustrated with ink portraits drawn by the Constructivist artist Marcel Janco, was, its title notwithstanding, a homage to writers of several generations. It notably included an extended discussion between Aderca and Lovinescu, summarizing the compatibilities, and disagreements, between the two Sburătorists. Elsewhere, Aderca approaches Ion Barbu to discuss the principal stages in Barbu's poetry: Barbu rejects Aderca's calling his 1920s hermetics phase șaradistă ("charades-ist"), opening up a field of debates between later exegetes of his work.

In other chapters, Cezar Petrescu recounts his ideological preparation and his various youthful choices, while Arghezi speaks about his commitment to art for art's sake. The book also includes exchanges between Aderca and sculptor Oscar Han, who reacts against the official policies in regard to national landmarks. The other men and women interviewed by Aderca are: writers Blaga, Papadat-Bengescu, Rebreanu, Vinea, Ticu Archip, Camil Petrescu, Carol Ardeleanu, Ioan Alexandru Brătescu-Voinești, Vasile Demetrius, Mihail Dragomirescu, Victor Eftimiu, Elena Farago, Gala Galaction, Octavian Goga, Ion Minulescu, D. Nanu, Cincinat Pavelescu, Mihail Sadoveanu and Mihail Sorbul; actresses Dida Solomon, Marioara Ventura and Marioara Voiculescu; sculptor Ion Jalea and art collector Krikor Zambaccian.

At around the same time, Aderca reviewed the works of Benjamin Fondane, prompted by Fondane's success in France. His recollections about Insula and his summary of Fondane's schooling were corrected by Fondane himself, who was somewhat irritated by the affair (the poet's reply was published in 1930 in Adam, a magazine put out by Isac Ludo). Despite such disagreements, Aderca and Fondane were still corresponding frequently, and Aderca was even approached to arrange Fondane's return visit Romania (planned during Fondane's second stay in Argentina).

Aderca's next contributions as a novelist came in 1932, when he completed the fantasy volume Aventurile D-lui Ionel Lăcustă-Termidor ("The Adventures of Mr. Ionel Lăcustă-Termidor") and published, in two consecutive issues of Realitatea Ilustrată magazine, the first fragments of his science fiction work, Orașele înecate ("The Drowned Cities"), later known as Orașe scufundate ("Submerged Cities"). Originally, these pieces, grouped under the working title X-O. Romanul viitorului ("X-O. A Novel of the Future"), were signed with the pen name Leone Palmantini. A faux biographical note introduced him as an Italian national with a keen interest in Romania. Two years later, Aderca's various biographical sketches of 19th- and 20th-century personalities came out as Oameni excepționali ("Exceptional People"), followed in 1935 by his essay on modern life in the United States. He expanded his range as a journalist, collaborating on Petre Pandrea's Cuvântul Liber, Ludo's Adam, and Discobolul (put out by Dan Petrașincu and Ieronim Șerbu).

=== Pornography scandal ===
In the late 1920s, Aderca became involved in the great debate opposing modernists and traditionalists over the issue of "pornography" in literature, both foreign (translated) and local. A 1931 article for Vremea, titled Pornografie? ("Pornography?") and subtitled Note pentru un studiu de literatură comparată ("Notes for a study in comparative literature"), he spoke out against such branding, notably defending the artistic integrity of James Joyce and the sexual content of his novel Ulysses. At around the same time, he offered an enthusiastic reception to a similarly controversial work by young Romanian author Mircea Eliade, Isabel și apele diavolului, writing for Adevărul newspaper: "In a country of great culture, such a debut would have brought glory, fame, and riches to the author."

His political stances and his rejection of sexual conventions brought him to the attention of state authorities. A confidential 1927 report compiled by Siguranța Statului secret service stated allegations about his "lack of respect" for King Ferdinand I, his ridicule of "our healthy customs" and for tradition, his recourse to "most detestable pornography" and "deranged sexuality". The period also saw Aderca and other young modernists in conflict with historian Nicolae Iorga, the editor of Cuget Clar review and doyen of Romanian traditionalism, who branded Aderca as a purveyor of "sick" literature. At Cuvântul Liber, he defended in effigy the classic of Romanian cosmopolitanism and literary realism, Ion Luca Caragiale, from attacks by the modern traditionalist, N. Davidescu (whom Aderca dismissed as a "sanguinary reactionary").

In 1932, Aderca, together with fellow novelists Camil Petrescu and Liviu Rebreanu, took part in a public discussion (presided upon by philosopher Ion Petrovici and held inside a Lipscani cinema), tackling the international scandal sparked by D. H. Lawrence's book Lady Chatterley's Lover, and, in more general terms, the degree of acceptance for both erotic literature and profane language. In the end, the participants found that they could agree on dropping some of the more rigid traditional conventions, including the practice of self-censorship, while Aderca himself publicized his praise for Lawrence's "unparalleled poetic moment". The following year, he completed work on a novel directly inspired by Lawrence: Al doilea amant al doamnei Chatterley ("Lady Chatterley's Second Lover"), called "an unsettling remake" by literary historian Ștefan Borbély, and retrospectively listed by critic Gheorghe Grigurcu among the most important sexually themed Romanian texts of Aderca's generation.

At the center of a major scandal, Al doilea amant resulted, some four years later, in Aderca's arrest on charges on pornography. Aderca was thus the last alleged pornographer to be taken in custody among a wave of modernist authors: directly preceding him were Geo Bogza and H. Bonciu, the former of whom publicly defended himself and his colleagues with statements than none of the works incriminated had been printed in more than 500 copies. The 1937 clampdown was celebrated by the far-right and traditionalist press, and notably so by critic Ovidiu Papadima's articles in the fascist paper Sfarmă-Piatră. Similarly, Iorga's nationalist magazines Cuget Clar and Neamul Românesc signaled Aderca as one of the ten Romanian authors worthy of an official blacklisting.

In the remaining years leading up World War II, Aderca was centering his interest on political themes. It was at this stage that he wrote 1916, a novel largely dedicated to Romania's World War I defeats, first printed on their 20th anniversary (1936). In 1937, Editura Vremea also issued the first complete edition of Orașele înecate, revealing him as the man behind the Palmantini surname. Revolte ("Revolts"), first published in 1945 but, according to Aderca's own statement, completed in 1938, explored the issues posed by Romania's judicial system, while A fost odată un imperiu ("There Once Was an Empire", 1939) was in part a historical novel about the decline and fall of Imperial Russia.

=== Antisemitic persecution and World War II ===
In early 1938, soon after the antisemitic political partners Octavian Goga and A. C. Cuza formed a new cabinet, Aderca found himself directly exposed to political repercussions. While all Jewish non-veterans were being expelled from the public service, Labor Minister Gheorghe Cuza issued an order to have Aderca sent on disciplinary reassignment to a remote city, either Cernăuți or Chișinău. The measure, which implied that Aderca would be forced to leave his wife and son behind, sparked a public protest from writer Zaharia Stancu. He denounced the hypocrisy of persecuting a Jew who had "done his duty in full" during the war, whereas Premier Goga had no military record to speak of. Jewish writer Mihail Sebastian also recorded, in his Journal, the sadness of seeing how, "after two wars and twenty books", the middle-aged Aderca was being sent away from the capital and being reduced to a precarious existence "as a reprisal". Sebastian added: "I read a letter he sent to his wife: no laments, almost no bitterness." Aderca was then ordered to yet another corner of the country, in the town of Lugoj, before being stripped of his clerk post altogether.

Although expelled from the Writers' Society for being Jewish, Aderca spent some of the following period writing a biographical novel on Russian Emperor Peter the Great; completed in 1940, it was titled Petru cel Mare: întâiul revoluționar-constructorul Rusiei, "Peter the Great: The Original Revolutionist, the Constructor of Russia". Later that year, Aderca was again in Bucharest, where he became artistic director of the Barașeum Jewish Theater before its grand opening. The context was exceptionally difficult for the Jewish ghetto, as the radically fascist Iron Guard set up its National Legionary government. Aderca's mission was aggravated by other issues: Marcel Janco, in charge of renovation, escaped to Palestine before the inauguration; in parallel, a conflict over the repertoire took place between lead actresses Leny Caler and Beate Fredanov, while Aderca's friend Sebastian declined interest in helping him manage the theater.

The January 1941 Rebellion, when Romania's authoritarian leader Ion Antonescu was confronted by a violent rising of his Iron Guard partners, made Aderca a victim of the parallel Bucharest pogrom. Sebastian's Journal claims that Aderca was "almost comical in his naiveté": instead of hiding from the Guard's murderous rampage, Aderca had walked into a Guardist meeting house "in search of information", was kidnapped and beaten up, but released just as others in the makeshift prison were being killed. Barașeum opened, under new management, a month later.

After new antisemitic legislation expelled Jews from the civil service and the education system (see Romania during World War II, Holocaust in Romania), Aderca found employment as a lecturer in aesthetics at the private Jewish school of Marcu Onescu. He, Sebastian and the other Jewish Romanian literary people and journalists were mentioned on a censorship list compiled by the Antonescu government, their works officially banned.

Among those who still visited Aderca's home near the Cișmigiu Gardens was Sebastian, who also worked at the Onescu private school, and Lovinescu, before his untimely death. Following his expulsion from the Writers' Society, Aderca lost his financial backbone. According to poet Virgil Carianopol, he relied on help from fellow writer Marius Mircu (known to him by the pen name G. M. Vlădescu), whose estate and revenue was distributed among a host a marginalized artists. In August 1941, the antisemitic policies endorsed by Antonescu exposed Aderca to the risk of internment in a labor camp for Jewish prisoners. He received official notice to present himself for deportation, but, owing to his World War I military record, he was eventually granted a reprieve.

=== Late 1940s ===
Aderca resumed his cultural activities shortly after the 1944 Coup toppled Antonescu. The new governments appointed him head of Artistic Education within the Ministry of Arts, where he was kept until 1948. By January 1945, he was engaged in a polemic with George Călinescu. Focusing on Călinescu's mixed review of his novels, it was sparked by Aderca's article in Democrația gazette (titled Rondul de noapte, or "Night Watch"), and later rekindled by replies in newspapers such as Victoria and Națiunea Română. Aderca was in contact with a younger author, Ion Biberi, who published their conversations as a chapter of his volume Lumea de mâine ("The World of Tomorrow").

Aderce received several honors, including a Knighthood of the Meritul Cultural Order, and work began on a definitive edition of his works. In May 1945, he represented the Ministry of Arts at the funeral of his friend Sebastian, who had been killed in a road accident. Reintegrated into the Writers' Society, Aderca was a member of the panel which granted the 1946 National Prize for Prose Works to his former colleague Papadat-Bengescu. In his articles for Romanian papers, Aderca himself described this measure as a sign that Romania was returning to artistic and political normality, rewarding talent on a democratic rather than ethnic basis.

Following Lovinescu's death, Aderca joined a board of writers which still granting annual awards in his memory. By this moment, Aderca was taking part in disputes between the more established Sburătorists and Lovinescu's younger disciples from the Sibiu Literary Circle. While he shared the awards panel with Sibiu Circle leader Ion Negoițescu, Aderca made known his opposition to making poet Ștefan Augustin Doinaș a laureate for 1947, probably owing to Doinaș's occasional recourse to patriotic, and therefore politicized, subjects. In addition to the delayed edition of Revolte and the 1945 version of his collected writings (published in 1945 as Opere, "Works", and prefaced by Tudor Vianu), he made his comeback with a 1947 volume of conversations on the art of ballet, while resuming his activities as a translator with versions of books by, among others, Vicki Baum, John Steinbeck and Egon Erwin Kisch. He also completed a new work in drama, the parable Muzică de balet ("Ballet Music"). It doubled as a comment on wartime antisemitism.

=== Final years and death ===
According to Crohmălniceanu, Aderca's political nonconformity was already showing up in 1950, when the literary community began avoiding "as the plague". He spent part of 1951 at a Writers' Union vacation home in Sinaia, leaving behind a manuscript diary of his experiences. Although critical of the old regime and compliant with the official dogma, it described the place as a run-down refuge for literary failures, desperate to assimilate the tenets of socialist realism, and allowing themselves to be closely monitored by political supervisors.

The final portion of Aderca's work, which covers the period after the establishment of a Romanian communist regime, is focused on children's literature, as well as on biographical and adventure novels (or, according to Crohmălniceanu, "books for the youth, romanticized biographies and historical-adventure evocations"). These volumes include the 1955 book În valea marelui fluviu ("Along the Great River's Valley"), a 1957 biography of Christopher Columbus and the 1958 Jurnalul lui Andrei Hudici ("The Diary of Andrei Hudici"), and a narrative set in Peter the Great's Russia (Un călăreț pierdut în stepă, "A Rider Lost in the Steppe"). Partly motivated by ideological commands, he also contributed a biographical essya of the 19th-century Marxist ideologue, Constantin Dobrogeanu-Gherea.

Incapacitated by a severe road accident, Aderca spent the final years of his life in relative isolation. His 1956 contract with Editura de Stat pentru Literatură și Artă (ESPLA), a state publishing house supervised by writer Petru Dumitriu, resulted in public scandal: ESPLA filed a legal complaint against Aderca, accusing him of not having returned a large sum of money he had received as an advance on his planned novel Casa cu cinci fete ("The House with Five Girls"). The work had been rejected for its "ideological-political mistakes" and "plainly reactionary ideas" (see Censorship in Communist Romania). He was blacklisted again, but Crohmălniceanu obtained a partial clearing of his name in 1960. Aderca was allowed to publish in Contemporanul an homage to Arghezi, who had just been fully rehabilitated. In the early 1960s, Aderca and Sanda Movilă were again frequenting the Writers' Union clubs. Aderca found himself snubbed by Arghezi, which upset him greatly.

The controversy about his work was renewed in 1962. That year, ESPLA's new manager, Mihai Gafița, decided against publishing Aderca's three-volume biographical study on Johann Wolfgang von Goethe, on which the aging writer had reportedly been working since 1948. This reaction greatly upset Aderca. He appeal to the highest authority, Communist Party leader Gheorghe Gheorghiu-Dej, asking him to reassess the text's ideological substance. He noted that another one of his texts, a reportage piece about workers in the Magyar Autonomous Region, was also being ignored by Gafița.

As early as 1956, Aderca was displaying signs of a neurological disorder. Diagnosed with a brain tumor, he died before the ESPLA matter could be settled. In accordance with his dying request, his body was cremated and the ashes were scattered into the Black Sea by his widow and son.

== Work ==
=== General characteristics ===
Starting in the 1920s, Aderca earned the critics' attention with the frequency of his contributions and combative stances. Writing in 1945, Tudor Vianu described him as the local "encyclopédiste", suggesting that reviewing Aderca's entire work would take a lifetime. Literary historian Henri Zalis notes that Aderca was well liked for his "extreme feverishness", adopting so many literary that his colleagues were inevitably eclipsed: "we find in Aderca the rural and the urban epics, the erotic annotation and the obsessive fixation, the tribulation of a mindset as much as the traumatic drunkenness." George Călinescu saw in Aderca a "humorist" of "subtle reserve" and "decent sarcasm", who could nevertheless veer into uncritical enthusiasm for the "fictitious world" of political ideology. Aderca's contribution to Romanian humor was highlighted by others among his contemporaries: one of them, memoirist Vlaicu Bârna, recalled his "causer's charm".

Although acknowledged for its productivity, Aderca's writing career was seen by various critics as marked by inconsistencies and failures. One such voice from his own generation, Pompiliu Constantinescu, opined that Aderca's intelligence got in the way of his sensitivity, hampering his style. Decades later, literary critic Constantin Cubleșan spoke of Aderca as one of several interwar authors who incorporated modernist influences, in a wide variety of literary genres, "without ever really deepening any"; Aderca's contribution brings together "parabolic conflicts" and "naturalism", at the risk of blandness. He sees Aderca as the "underachieving virtuoso" with an "undecided place" in culture.

Cubleșan believes that, despite Aderca's fecundity, he never made the Romanian literary who's who. In support of this, he cites a 1936 essay by modernist writer and critic Eugène Ionesco. Having already attacked Aderca and other established voices in criticism with his 1934 pamphlet Nu ("No"), Ionesco concluded that Aderca had "the destiny of a journalist: his literary glory is condemned to be as ephemeral as it is diverse, and his name cannot be tied down to any somewhat important work".

=== Aderca's modernism ===
The many aspects of Aderca's work, critics suggest, are held together by a thread of experimental literature. In reference to such aspects, Constantin Cubleșan defined Aderca as "a permanent literary rebel, ever ready to contest anything and become enthusiastic, in equal measure, over anything, in fact searching for himself". Writing in 2005, Ștefan Borbély noted that much of this literature was commercial in nature, driven by the wish to assimilate fashionable themes. In contrast, Henri Zalis, who cites an earlier statement made by Vianu, finds Aderca to be a storyteller in the Romantic tradition. Zalis also notes that such difficulties in assessing Aderca's stylistic category have to do with the single motivation of his protagonists, often an erotic one, which "circumscribes" their whole existence. Zalis sees Aderca's work as superficially indebted to the more naturalistic modernist school, through its vitalism, but ultimately "bookish" in character.

With his literary theory, Aderca sought to import Western modernism, acclimatizing its diverse components to a Romanian context. His various works are more or less explicitly indebted to Expressionism, which they mimic in altering traditional narrative techniques. As historian Dan Grigorescu suggests, Aderca's articles fail to state outright his affiliation to Expressionism, but nevertheless allude to a "total" commitment. Crohmălniceanu places Aderca midway between naturalistic techniques and Expressionism, in the proximity of writers such as Gib Mihăescu and George Mihail Zamfirescu. Expressionist distortions, he notes, are used by Aderca only where they can suggest a "second level" of the narrative. Cubleșan explains Aderca's "utopian" works as inherently Expressionistic, "evading the terrifying concreteness of immediate reality". Additionally, literary historian Paul Cernat places Aderca's 1923 play, Sburătorul, in the Expressionist "harvest" of early 1920s Romania (alongside works by Blaga, George Ciprian, Adrian Maniu and Isaia Răcăciuni). He also cautions that, despite their modernism, all these texts "did not feature anything radical".

While borrowing from Expressionist ideology and other products of modern German literature, Aderca adopted and promoted styles associated with the other new trends of Western Europe. A modernist colleague, the literary critic Perpessicius, noted that Aderca was one of Romania's writers most inspired by psychoanalysis, at a time when Romanians were just learning about its existence. Crohmălniceanu also drew attention to Aderca's adoption of internal monologues. Aderca's unconventional style, like those of Ion Călugăru, Ion Vinea or Maniu, was associated by some with the trademark style of Urmuz, a maverick figure of the 1920s Romanian avant-garde scene. This suggestion was criticized by Perpessicius, who concluded that Urmuz was virtually unknown to the world by the time Aderca began writing his prose.

Another guiding light in Aderca's work was French novelist Marcel Proust. Aderca, Benjamin Fondane and Mihai Ralea were among the first Romanian critics to review Proust's literary techniques. Among the critics, Crohmălniceanu argues that Proustian "formulas" and borrowings from James Joyce are the backbone of Aderca's fiction work, and announce later developments in Romanian modernism. The accuracy of Aderca's early pronouncements about In Search of Lost Time was much debated within the Romanian literary community. In essence, Aderca depicted Proust as a "Symbolist novelist" and a visionary subverter of the classical novel. His friend Mihail Sebastian energetically disputed such assessments (Sebastian contrarily believed that Proust had in fact fortified an endangered classical genre); he also rejected Aderca's attempts to identify the real-life inspirations behind Proustian characters.

=== Sburătorism and anti-Sburătorism ===
Despite his own beginnings in provincial traditionalism, Aderca was mostly noted as a vocal critic of the current heralded by Sămănătorul and Ramuri. Like Eugen Lovinescu and other Sburătorul faction representatives, Aderca paid homage to an era of art for art's sake, an art that, as he put it, "must remain nude". In doing so, Aderca took some inspiration from the 19th century literary club Junimea. According to Crohmălniceanu, Lovinescu and Aderca both maintained a "cult" of Maiorescu, whom Mic tratat de estetică depicted as more of an anti-establishment character more than the conservative politico of other accounts. Overall, Aderca endorsed Lovinescu's synthesis of Junimism and modernism, known as "synchronism". Like Lovinescu, he spoke out against the traditionalist brakes on Westernization, and proposing an even fuller integration with Western culture. Some who witnessed first-hand the debates at Sburătorul suggest that Aderca's ideas on poetics greatly influenced the group's ideology, while fitting into Lovinescu's greater theoretical scheme.

Such ideas placed Aderca squarely against the voices of traditionalism, whether right- or left-wing. His attack on right-wing traditionalists featured sarcastic remarks, for instance referring to historian and critic Nicolae Iorga as the one driving "the boorish carts of Sămănătorism". In Aderca's view, the leftist traditionalists emerging from the Poporanist faction were just as wrong in demanding the application of a "national criterion" in art. He stated this objection in a publicized polemic with the Poporanist doyen Garabet Ibrăileanu: "I do not know if [Romanian cultural products] are not in essence, at the stage where culture has penetrated, the same as those [of peripheral regions] where the iron man of European civilization walks with a heavy stride." He ridiculed the didacticism of other writers, dismissing them with terms borrowed from Ion Luca Caragiale: they were "firemen-citizens and citizens-firemen".

However, Aderca was also inclined to question the absolute validity of synchronistic tenets: suggesting that the pursuit of innovation as a goal could prove undermine a one's originality, he cautioned that such imperatives could replicate the negative consequences of public commands. His belief that formal conventions needed to be questioned whenever necessary was nuanced by Lovinescu, who replied that good literature could still be conventional in style. Aderca also fell short of Lovinescu's principles about Romanian novelists eventually needing to discard lyricism for an objective approach to writing. An additional debate came in 1937, when Aderca, writing for Adevărul, rebuked Lovinescu for having ignored the contributions of Urmuz, "the extraordinary, peculiar, unique and brilliant [one]". Aderca, seen by Cernat as one of several modern Romanian poets who took on the offices of critics while rejecting all displays of critical authority, took a stand against all academic intervention in the area of literature. He described such intrusions as restrictive, compared professional critics to barbers, and argued that critical empathy was more desirable than theoretical purism. His Mic tratat declared itself interested in what "the aesthetic phenomenon" was not, rather than what it was. It ridiculed the various schools of interpretation, stating Aderca's regret at ever having contributed to literary criticism.

Crohmălniceanu mainly sees Aderca as an energetic Sburătorist writer, whose presence in the pages of Contimporanul did not signify his actual affiliation to that rival circle. He suggests that Aderca was in equal measure a member of two separate subgroups of Sburătorul writers: the analytical ones, passionate about "the more complicated psychologies" (a segment also represented by Anton Holban and Henriette Yvonne Stahl); the sexually emancipated ones, who blended a generic preference for urban settings with explorations into the themes erotic literature, and whose other militants were Răcăciuni, Mihail Celarianu and Sergiu Dan. The analytical and erotic characteristics merged in several of Aderca's works. Crohmălniceanu notes that Aderca saw in sexuality the answer to a command arising "from the depths of life and the cosmic order", as well as the true source of human identity and individuality.

Paul Cernat argues that, with fellow critic-novelist N. D. Cocea, Aderca was among those Contimporanul men who remained outside the avant-garde movement, while making only few concessions to avant-garde aesthetics. Aderca's conflicting allegiances were even approached with severity by Vinea. In a 1927 editorial for Contimporanul, where he compared Lovinescu's review to "a menagerie", Vinea stated: "[Among Sburătorul contributors,] only F. Aderca simulates controversy, shouting through his cage: 'I am independent... Not a day passes that I don't quarrel with Lovinescu...' And, at the same time, the insensitive tamer [Lovinescu] makes his elephants play the piano".

=== Early works ===
Aderca's original contribution to literature came in the form of lyric poetry. His five volumes of poems, published between 1910 and 1912, were noted by Crohmălniceanu for their "intellectualized sensualism", with introspective methods that were ahead of their time. However, Crohmălniceanu also suggests that their cut section of the early 20th century Romanian lexis renders these works dated. Similarly, Călinescu discussed Aderca's love poetry as being dominated by "suggestions" and "sensations", but without "sentiment". The most important of Aderca's lyrical work, he notes, was to be found elsewhere, in "pantheistic" poems rather like those by Ion Barbu, where focus shifts toward the great expanses of the cosmos or the mineral world. As noted by Pârvulescu, Aderca's other contributions in the field, in Versuri pentru Monica, falls into the category of "society games" that merely exercise his versification skills.

In the psychological novel Domnișoara din Str. Neptun, Aderca sought to challenge a favorite theme of traditionalist and Sămănătorist literature: Sămănătorists shunned the city as a heartless consumer of rural energy and as a place where peasants surrendered to a miserably corrupted life. Henri Zalis, for whom the text is more a novella than a novel, sees another hidden, "subversive" intent: "the suaveness in unhappiness, authenticity bursting from the burning core of alienation." Zalis further noted that Aderca subscribed to the "demystification" of the mahala quarters, where migrant peasants tended to resettle, and which earlier literature had elevated into an idyllic environment. Aderca points out that the mahala is "a city's reproductive organ", a landscape of brutal naturalness and "virility". As Crohmălniceanu argues, Aderca rewrites Sămănătorist tropes into an Expressionist conflict between city and village, the "two great collective entities".

Aderca opens with the urban resettlement of Păun Oproiu, a peasant turned State Railways employee. Instead of finding himself lured by a modern industrial city, Păun turns into a mahala dweller, a more familiar setting. With his death on the World War I front, the focus shifts on his family. Widow and daughters make their return into the village, but their re-assimilation is illusory: daughter Nuța, returns into the city, where she chooses the life of a kept woman and, in the end, turns to prostitution. Her moral decline turns into physical ruin, with her many former lovers turning away in disgust. She resolves to commit suicide, jumping in front of a moving train (depicted in the book as her ultimate erotic embrace). Such modernist storytelling received an unconventional praise from Aderca's colleague Fondane: "The book [...] is so picturesque, and carries in it such sensuality, that each reader can be intimate with an almost lifelike Nuța."

=== The war novels ===
As early as 1922, the Symbolist critic Pompiliu Păltânea depicted Aderca as an essentially "ideological" and anti-war writer, alongside Eugen Relgis, Ioan Alexandru Brătescu-Voinești and Barbu Lăzăreanu. Moartea unei republici roșii introduces Aderca's alter ego, the engineer Aurel: his first-person narrative brings up the moral dilemmas of his participation in the Hungarian–Romanian War of 1919. A conflicted Marxist, Aurel finds himself serving in Transylvania, under attack by the Hungarian Reds. Moreover, his trust in the necessity of universal brotherhood and his fear of ethnic conflict are enforced once he witnesses the Romanians' arrogance, their random murders of Transylvanian Hungarian prisoners, and their oppression of Tranylvanian Jews. Crohmălniceanu sees the book as notable for its introspective tone, which culminates in a self-irony that offsets the battle scenes. The latter are depicted "in a cold, record keeping-like manner".

With 1916, Aderca was focusing more closely on the social impact of war. A wide fresco of Romania's heavy losses to the Central Powers, and of the human drama they unfold, the book was praised by Lovinescu as an accurate portrayal of the 1914 to 1920 interval, and seen by Cubleșan as compatible with other Romanian depictions of World War I moral conflicts—in works by Camil Petrescu, Cezar Petrescu, Liviu Rebreanu or George Cornea. Aderca's novel, he notes, is an inverted take on the identity struggle depicted in Rebreanu's Forest of the Hanged, where an ethnic Romanian intellectual reevaluates his allegiance to Austria-Hungary. The plot is largely conventional in format, but Aderca turns to avant-garde techniques where he found they could enhance narrative authenticity: in one section, he mixes sheet music into the text.

The central figure here is Romanian Army officer Titel Ursu. A Germanophile, he finds war on the Entente side to be a humiliation, and, once on the front line, sabotages the war effort to the point where he is arrested and tried for treason. In contrast, his father, Captain Costache Ursu, is by everyone's standards a war hero, and firmly believes in the patriotic virtues of the pro-Entente leaders. They confront each other on prison grounds: while Titel is awaiting execution, his indignant father urges him to commit suicide and save their honor—the "keystone" moment, according to Cubleșan. Costache hatred for his son, although counterbalanced by pity and regret, bewildered critics of that day and age. A fragment reads: "[Costache] hated Titel, hated him with ever-burning embers between his eyelids, with a slab of stone on his chest, that shortened his breath. [...] His son's existence on the face of the earth seemed to him a horrible mistake." Later commentators found more sympathy for Aderca's attempt: Zalis argued that Aderca had intended to "collect, from the cortege of massacres, the effort of conscience of exasperation and perplexity". Elevated to hero status in interwar Greater Romania, and decorated with the Order of Michael the Brave, Costache is attracted into far-right politics, only to find that he has been manipulated by more cynical political partners. His hatred for Titel then morphs into a burning regret, and pushes Costache to suicide.

The implicit political statement has endured as a subject of controversy. Crohmălniceanu finds the description of defeats such as the Battle of Turtucaia to be impressive, and argues that the core thesis is "intelligent"—but also confused and unconvincing. In his view, 1916 glosses over the true agenda of Ententist Romanians, including their hopes for a postwar political union with their co-nationals in Austria-Hungary. Similarly, Zalis argued that 1916 is split between "highly evocative chronicle" and, "for unexplainable reasons", a polemical format that is "confused, confusing, attackable".

Both Moartea unei republici roșii and 1916 were found especially offensive by George Călinescu. In his synthesis of literary history (first published in 1941), he argued that Aderca was in effect "glorifying [...] desertion". He described 1916 as being ruined by its pacifist agenda, and a "manifesto" serving to "flog virtues"; still, he reserved praise for the "somber and dramatic" manner in which Aderca chose to render the war scenes. Călinescu censured the scenes of bloodlust and thievery, calling them "enormities" and "slanted falsities", and concluding: "A critic reads the book without emotion and finds in it the spiritual expression of an old people, greatly gifted but with some of its faculties blunted, [whereas] a regular reader cannot escape a legitimate feeling of antipathy." Some of these points have been cited by other researchers as evidence of Călinescu's residual antisemitism, which is argued to have also surfaced in his treatment of other Jewish authors. Călinescu's posited that, like "many Jewish writers", "Felix Aderca is obsessed with humanitarianism, pacifism, and all other aspects of internationalism." He saw the works as study cases, suggesting that pacifism was a typically Jewish trait in Greater Romania, a more palatable form of "anti-national" (that is, anti-Romanian) ideologies. In Andrei Oișteanu's view, such allegations merely modernized old prejudice depicting Jews as a cowardly race.

Although, at the time when Călinescu's work was first published, Aderca was already marginalized, he made a point of replying to the allegations. Sebastian, who read a version of this rebuttal during one of his visits to Aderca's home, admired the effort: "[The reply is] very nice, very accurate—but how did he find the strength, the inclination, the curiosity to write it? A sign of youthful vitality. [...] Why do I not feel personally 'aimed at' in what is said, done, or written against me?" Writing in 2009, literary historian Alexandru George took Călinescu's side against Aderca: the allegation of antisemitism was "very unconvincing", and the rebuttal came just as Călinescu was being incriminated for philosemitism by the far-right Gândirea magazine. Others also note that the very mention of Aderca's name in Călinescu's work was valid proof of Călinescu dissidence. Aderca's own replies, leading up to the 1945 article Rondul de noapte, became topics of scandal, and, according to Călinescu's disciple Alexandru Piru, came as a "curious", "violent outburst".

=== Erotic and fantasy prose ===
In Țapul and Omul descompus alike, Aderca follows the adventures of Aurel (or "Mr. Aurel"), "an intellectual without precise occupations", structured around Aurel's erotic pursuits, retold by an unreliable narrator and in "Proustian techniques". Omul descompus, which focuses on Aurel's affair with a tuberculosis-stricken lady, is dismissed by Călinescu as "pale", and is seen by Ștefan Borbély as the "mimetic" sample of "approximate existentialism". Yet, as Crohmălniceanu writes, Aderca manages to avoid "lewdness", and instead carries out, "with deftness", a "plunge into the unconscious". The themes are expanded upon in Femeia cu carne albă: Mr. Aurel and his cabby Mitru take a trip along the Danube, stopping over for Aurel to have erotic encounters with various local women. The latter are quasi-anonymous, referred to by the defining characteristic of their carnal appeal: "the red backfisch", "the woman of the rains", and the eponymous "white-fleshed woman" Ioana of Rogova. The story builds up to the meeting between Aurel and Ioana: here, the roles of seduced and seducer are reversed, as Aurel falls victim to a woman's sexual energy.

Călinescu, who identified here samples of Aderca's "most substantial" prose, believed that the work was inspired by, and alluded to, the work of another Romanian modernist: Gala Galaction. Aderca shifted focus from depicting pure sexuality, with sketches of the female psyche and the bizarre landscapes of the countryside. The wild Danubian landscape is a setting for morbid discoveries, including dead bodies of girls, half devoured by pigs; in the end, Aurel himself is murdered and mutilated by Ioana's hajduk gang. He accepts death as expressing a higher ideal: according to Zalis, Aderca suggests that self-sacrifice is a natural outcome of erotic fulfillment, and accepted by one with a sense of detachment. As Crohmălniceanu notes, the "purely sensory field" takes precedence over the analytical, but still glimpses into "hidden cosmic mechanics". "Paradoxically", he suggests, Expressionism takes the forefront here, rather than in Aderca's more psychological novels. Here, Expressionist language aims to suggest Aurel's exhausting confrontation with the frantic terrestrial forces.

Displaying Aderca's flirtations with the avant-garde, Aventurile D-lui Ionel Lăcustă-Termidor is a fantasy work, at once parabolic and sarcastic, read as a poetic expression of its author's own nonconformity. It evades stylistic conventions, rejects linear time, and, as Cubleșan notes, reacts against modern-day depersonalization; in Crohmălniceanu's words, its "extreme" subjectivity and Expressionist techniques create "an entirely autonomous world". The eponymous hero works as a writer in modern Romania, but has an identity is both ancient and plural: "He is from unmeasured spaces and times, ones about which the human mind was not able to state anything other than that they might have, to a human eye, the shape inscribed by the chalk of the falling star over the blackboard that is the sky." In its original print, the novel came with photographs illustrating some of Ionel's many avatars: a head of cabbage, a tree, a polar bear, and a Black African dancer.

Told off as a mere oddity by commoners, Ionel is an actual social visionary. His writings channel the magical world that has spawned him, and his contribution, Cubleșan notes, inventories "ideal, universally human, values". The stories he tells are merged into the wider narrative. One retells the myth of a "happy, rational and superior" Atlantis, submerged by the nefarious tribes of Norwegian and Greenland stock. Crohmălniceanu notes that the text constitutes "ironic commentary on the subject of enthusiastic and insignificant experiences". In his view, this is one of the avant-garde's "most substantial and accomplished works". Instead, Călinescu sees the work as a mediocre reply to the fantasy writings of Tudor Arghezi, written with "ungainly wit". He suggested the story of reincarnation was meant to spur debate about "the uselessness of identifying oneself with a motherland".

=== Orașele înecate ===
In Orașele înecate, influenced by H. G. Wells, Aderca borrowed the trappings of science fiction to comment on human civilization. His prologue and epitaph credit the idea for the novel to an unnamed scientist and to Friedrich Nietzsche's study of mythopoeia. Aderca's prophetic ambition is underlined by Crohmălniceanu, as "an entirely new social and psychological reality". According to Cubleșan, the more important aspect is Aderca's rendition of psychology on the edge: "a fantasy novel about life at the limit". While noting work for its "ingenuity" and "English humor", Călinescu still found Orașele înecate to be lacking a "deeper significance". The plot's inventiveness has led other critics to conclude that Aderca had effectively set the foundations of Romanian science fiction.

Psychological and speculative elements are introduced by dream sequence: in 5th millennium Bucharest, a modern and luxurious metropolis, the cinema attendant Ioan has a future-sight dream of a post-apocalyptic world subject to global cooling. Humans have fled the Earth's surface, rebuilding civilization on the seafloor, accessing the heat of the inner core. Society adopts a stark and primitive socialism, erasing "terrestrial instincts", making people into "mutes and idiots". A dictatorial President Pi (in typically fascist regalia), imposes eugenics and the communal rearing of children, banning economic competition and all ethnic affiliation.

Faced with such a drastic social experiment, and stunned by its arrest once the President dies, humans are faced with complete annihilation, as the cold wave progresses down toward the ocean floor. Scientists have to acknowledge yet another threat: that of biological devolution, turning men and women into oversized mollusks. Decision-makers are incapable of finding a global solution, but coalesce into competing factions. Two engineers personify that trend: Whitt suggests moving civilization closer to the inner molten regions; Xavier, inventor of nuclear propulsion, wants spacecraft to resettle humans on another planet. While Whitt and his secretary dig into the seafloor, Xavier and his concubine Olivia (collectively dubbed X-O) make a solitary escape into the cosmos.

Cubleșan reads here a warning against "man's isolation within the circle of his self-sufficiency". As philologist Elvira Sorohan notes, there are various tributes to the Czechoslovak science-fiction classic Karel Čapek, to the point of intertextuality. Like Čapek, Aderca supports the moral lesson with poetic detail. Described by Crohmălniceanu as fruits of "a rich fantasy", the "enormous toys" imagined are, according to Călinescu, "what gives the novel its charms". The underwater cities are eminently functionalist: the capital, located under Hawaiian Islands, is a crystal sphere; the deep-sea mine of the Mariana Trench is a giant pyramid with a molten base. These purposes are inverted once civilization goes into crisis. Depleted of geothermal power, settlements turn into quasi-aquariums, where men are curiosity examined by the marine creatures.

=== Other writings ===
Revolte shows (according to Cubleșan) a "manifest nonconformity with all social conventions"; it stands out as a "pamphlet-novel against judicial institutions". Crohmălniceanu sees it as "a finely analytical probe into a puzzling psychology and [...] a fine satire of legal formalism." Other literary critics read it mainly as a meditation on the human condition. Ion Negoițescu's sees in it "a first-rate parabolic writing", and Gabriel Dimisianu as an absurdist and Kafkaesque commentary about middle-class docility. Reportedly, Aderca first discovered Kafka in the mid-1930s, commending him (unusually) as "the Czechoslovak Urmuz".

At the core is the conflict between Istrăteanu, a sales representative for Buștean's gristmill, and the accountant Lowenstein. Finding that Istrăteanu has been operating an unusual credit system, Lowenstein carries out a formal investigation. The events highlight the ills of a judicial system: an incompetent but pompous counsel, whose many blunders strengthen the case of an unscrupulous prosecutor. Istrăteanu defies the system, depicting himself as the mill's savior, and proves his case by eventually becoming the new manager. Aderca reuses his narrative framework is retaken, casually depicting Istrăteanu's exotic sexuality and his memoirs of the war.

The diversity of literary approaches was later enhanced. Muzică de balet was considered highly original for its parable nature and the theme of racial persecution (see Holocaust literature). According to Zalis, it constitutes, within Romanian drama, the only sample of an "anti-racist warning". Similarly, novelist and critic Norman Manea, a survivor of the wartime deportations, cited Muzică de balet as one of the few Romanian writings from the post-war period to openly discuss the murder of Romanian Jews.

The biographical genre, preoccupying Aderca in old age, produced experimental as well as conventional works. In Oameni excepționali, his attention was dedicated to the lives of politicians (Adolf Hitler, Joseph Stalin, Woodrow Wilson), cultural figures (Sarah Bernhardt, Isadora Duncan, Leo Tolstoy, Richard Wagner) and business magnates (William Randolph Hearst, Henry Ford). Seen by Aderca himself as his personal best, A fost odată un imperiu centers on the life of Grigori Rasputin, the political guru whose influence preceded the Russian Revolution. As Crohmălniceanu notes, Aderca took up a theme from Klabund, but "ingeniously" retold the story with the faux objectivity of Kinostil Expressionism. The text then becomes highly subjective, comedic, chaotic text: Aderca explained this as an experiment of writing with a high fever. This approach is discarded in the ESPLA-rejected Goethe și lumea sa ("Goethe and His World"). Ostensibly inspired by Scientific Socialism, it claimed to illuminate the more conflicting sides of Goethe's life: his literary genius versus his lip service to the German aristocracy.

Aderca's final years were also marked by his cultivation of aphorism. His contribution to the genre is praised by Călinescu as evidence of an "undying curiosity" for "all aspects of art and life". One such sample reads: "Had we all been born exceptional, life in common would be impossible." Aderca also recorded an exchange between himself and his novelist friend H. Bonciu, who was on his death bed, losing a battle with cancer: to his own question about which death was "most bearable", which had left Aderca baffled, Bonciu gave the answer "someone else's".

== Political advocacy and related disputes ==
=== Aderca's take on socialism ===
Even before his adherence to radical modernism, with its own political undertones, Aderca was a respected social critic. His support for World War I neutrality, outlined in his Sânge închegat essays and in his Seara articles, emerged as a countercritique of anti-German sentiment. Aderca had it that the German Empire was morally justified in destroying the cultural patrimony of enemy nations, short of being "barbaric". That claim was controversial, and criticized by Aderca's fellow Germanophile, Constantin Rădulescu-Motru. Aderca's later proposed that the Central Powers were engaged in a "revolutionary war" on protectionism and imperialism.

Committed, by the 1920s, to a highly personalized pacifist socialism, Aderca veered toward the far-left of politics: in Idei și oameni, he chided Romanian reformism, moderate Marxism as personified by Constantin Dobrogeanu-Gherea and the Second International. He decried the exploitation of workers and luxuries such as the casinos of Sinaia. Nonetheless, Crohmălniceanu, a Marxist, noted that Moartea unei republici roșii told little about how "a new society is to be organized". Aderca favored "a nonconformism of a mostly moral and aesthetic kind", where sexual freedom, creative liberty and the celebration of "irreducible human individuality" were all in supply. In his early pacifist texts, Aderca approved of class conflict, with Marxism as a legitimiate tool of the masses: "war is a creation of masters fighting each other for dominance. [...] What can the impoverished people have in common with the polite master? The French worker, what does he stand to gain from this war, other than a more thorough understanding of Marxism?" Aderca's leftist leanings were incompatible with the neoliberalism of his mentor Eugen Lovinescu, something acknowledged by Aderca in his Mic tratat years. In Mărturia unei generații, Aderca challenged Lovinescu to answer on the subject. Lovinescu did so, noting that Sburătorul's celebration of individualism outweighed the neoliberal stance of its leader. In Aderca's work, socialism was doubled by a sarcastic view of traditional authority. Police officers opened a file on him when, in 1927, he mocked King Ferdinand I as a standard of barber shop posters. According to Dumitru Hîncu, although the comment irritated state security, it was not truly "an attack on State institutions or its leaders".

Aderca had middle-of-the-road values: he described feminism as a risky enterprise. In Bilete de Papagal, he depicted men as natural bread-earners, put off whenever women turned to "vulgar politics". According to gender historian Oana Băluță, he "oscillated between misogyny and sexism". Aderca also viewed girls' bob cut hairstyles as objectionable and sexless. Although his roots were in Judaism, he identified, for at least part of his life, with Christianity, Christian socialism, and Christian pacifism. According to Călinescu, his World War I articles reconciled "radical Christianity" with "sarcasm toward the victims [of war]." Later, Aderca envisaged an utopian world shaped by Christian Universalism. Nevertheless, his interview in Lumea de mâine, like all other of Ion Biberi's conversations with Marxists, avoids the issue of religion, touched in all of Biberi's other interviews.

This original socialism accounted, in part, for Aderca's poor reputation in Communist Romania. During his stint at Vremea, Aderca used Marxism against the Soviet Union and Stalinism, profiling Joseph Stalin as an "Asiatic tyrant". In Lumea de mâine, he expressed confidence that the post-fascist world would revert to liberty and democracy. Unaware of communist schemes, he referred to the post-1944 interval as the dawn of "supreme democracy".

His take on Stalinism rendered Oameni excepționali inaccessible during the subsequent period, and his biography of Dobrogeanu-Gherea was regarded as more of a gaffe—the communists regarded Gherea as a heretic. The 1956 ESPLA denunciation elaborated on Aderca's own "reactionary" stance: he had parted with Marxism-Leninism whenever he had to comment on such topics as communist revolution and the national issue. Appealing to Gheorghe Gheorghiu-Dej, Aderca suggested that Goethe și lumea sa showed his Marxist credentials, listing positive reviews from authors such as Mihai Isbășescu and Alfred Margul-Sperber, and proposed that the work could appeal to Marxist-Leninists in both the Eastern Bloc and the West. As Hîncu notes: "Published separately, torn from the context [...], the petition could pass for an act of opportunism, of cowardice, or even as proof of collaboration with the regime personified by Gheorghiu-Dej. But this was not the case. Aderca was purely and simply routed, he saw a threat to his years-long labor".

=== On nationalism and antisemitism ===
Many of Aderca's political articles, including some of his earliest, display his rejection of antisemitism. In his Lumea de mâine interview, Aderca spoke at length of his main stylistic themes, recognizing "revolt" as the main subject of his books. He defined this in relation to social alienation and antisemitic prejudice, referring to himself in the third person:

Throughout his life [Aderca] was chased around [...] by a gang of vigilantes in cahoots with executioners, who sought to end his life. What injustice had he or his ancestors committed, that he had to admit and repent for? A mystery. To which supreme command and to what sort of ineffable order would his elimination from this luminous world have been an answer? A mystery. And that this physical and moral assassination could not have been effected yet—therein lies the deepest mystery, the strange and awesome wonder of each day's morning.

Faced with the rise of racial discrimination, Aderca proposed civic nationalism and Jewish assimilation. He saw no incompatibility between having both Jewish and Romanian identities, debating such matters with A. L. Zissu, a leading figure in local Zionism. According to researcher Ovidiu Morar, Aderca was "the writer whose life, in close connection to his work, is perhaps the best reflection for the tragedy of local Judaism".

As early as 1916, Aderca attacked the claim that Jewish identity was monolithic, seeing it as inherently discriminatory. To him, the supposed Jewish "types" appeared "antagonistic", making the claim to Jewish nationhood doubtful. Commenting on Romania's postponement of Jewish emancipation, he protested that, at the added risk of enforcing prejudice about Jews being lazy and profiteering, members of the community were being actively prevented from engaging in any line of work other than commerce. Later, he parodied such accusations: "since they could not live on land, 'fish have monopolized the ponds' ". In a December 1922 issue of Contimporanul, under the title Deschideți bordeluri! ("Open up Brothels!"), he ridiculed the far-right's demand for a Jewish quota in universities, arguing that government toleration of antisemitic agitation was turning the students into hooligans.

Aderca was similarly troubled by philosemitism. He believed that positive discrimination was counterproductive, and favored race blindness: "When [an intellectual] secretly confesses philosemitism, all of a sudden I have a hunch. I would prefer to know he is indifferent." Looking back on Romanian antisemitism, Aderca sided with other Jewish thinkers who looked favorably on ethno-nationalists such as Mihai Eminescu. He argued that Eminescu's work was not particularly antisemitic, and evidenced those traits which gave it universal appeal.

After emancipation was proclaimed in Greater Romania, Aderca's militancy turned toward the practical recovery of civil rights. He saw Jews as on equal footing with the other ethnic minorities: "We [Jews] are Romanians at least as good as the Polacks, the Hungarians, the Bulgarians, and the Gypsy in Romania, who have sought and still seek to give us lessons in patriotism." Aderca saw nationalism as exploitative "parasitism", and therefore denounced highly centralized government in the multi-ethnic provinces. He opined that Bulgaria was justified in demanding to be ceded Southern Dobruja, "where no Romanian was ever born", and proposed a territorial autonomy system for Transylvania. One of his Contimporanul texts defined Romania as highly parochial and retrograde: "A motherland where laws and books need to be prepared a hundred years in advance, so that then, when the right time comes, the needs and tastes may change!"

Taking his cue from the Jewish community leader Wilhelm Filderman, Aderca reacted against the branding of Jews as inherent anti-Romanians, placing ethnic clashes in a larger context, where Romanians also battled each other. He was bitter that Jews were being stereotyped as fainthearted; he mentioned lists of Jews who had fought and died for Romania in World War I. During Octavian Goga's premiership, which reintroduced racial discrimination, Aderca issued calls for democratic dissent, suggesting a compendium of Jewish Romanian literary contributions, past and present.

By then, Aderca's own literature was being assessed from an antisemitic standpoint in traditionalist circles. Const. I. Emilian, studying Romania's modernist scene with an ultra-nationalist bias, dismissed all of Aderca's texts as "neurotic". The theme was taken up by Ovidiu Papadima in Sfarmă-Piatră, ridiculing Lovinescu as the unlikely patron of "revolutionary ideas" and of "the Jews" Aderca, Camil Baltazar, Benjamin Fondane, Ilarie Voronca, this being "the illusion of a literary movement". Papadima campaigned for Aderca and H. Bonciu to be arrested during the 1937 scandal, referred to them only under their original Jewish names, called them "swine" and "traders in hogwash", and suggested that erotic literature was "that Jewish business".

Some of Aderca's more moderate adversaries also addressed him with antisemitic tropes. Alongside Călinescu's controversial statements, there was the poet-dramatist Victor Eftimiu. Eftimiu compiled a list of his Jewish detractors, Aderca included, and assigned them racial stereotypes. According to Sebastian, Eftimiu also opposed, in 1944, that Aderca join the Romanian Writers' Society, since Jewish writers "should be pleased we're having them back". As Dumitru Hîncu notes, Aderca persecution began under Goga's administration, which included four professional writers, none of whom intervened. Similarly, Ovidiu Morar writes that only two Romanian literary figures made a public show of their support for defended Aderca in 1937: Zaharia Stancu and Perpessicius.

=== On fascism ===
Aderca's take on fascism was more ambiguous than his stance on antisemitism. In addition to the retrospective parable in Muzică de balet, a number of his earlier texts feature more or less explicit anti-fascist tropes. This is the case of 1916, with its grim prognosis of radical nationalism, and Oameni excepționali, where Nazism appears as a heterogeneous ideology. Aderca saw Adolf Hitler as a pale copy of Stalin and a reluctant follower of Marxian economics, propelled into high office by the inconsistencies of the German Communist Party. According to Zalis, anti-fascism is even present in the 1940 study of Peter the Great: Hitler was destroying a Europe that Peter had once helped civilize. In the late 1940s, investigating the wartime antisemitic crimes, Aderca objected to violent retribution, noting that victims had gained the moral high ground.

Nonetheless, Sebastian's Journal holds clues that Aderca admired the rhetoric of fascism. Aderca stated his regret that Corneliu Zelea Codreanu, founder of the fascist Iron Guard, had been killed during the political purges of 1938: "[Aderca] told me that he deplores the death of Codreanu, who was a great man, a real genius, a moral force without equal, whose 'saintly death' is an irreparable loss." In May 1940, Sebastian alleged that Aderca had retained and even radicalized such views. In this context, he reports, Aderca described both Codreanu and Goga as "great figures", spoke of Codreanu's Pentru legionari ("For the Legionaries") as "a historic book", and even argued that, had the Iron Guard not been antisemitic, "he would have joined it himself". Speaking of the failed Iron Guard revolt of January, Aderca allegedly accused the two Guardist rebels, Viorel Trifa and Dumitru Groza, of having acted as agents provocateurs serving Soviet interests (to which Sebastian adds the sarcastic note: "that shows his level of political competence"). As noted there, Aderca was also reevaluating Hitler as a "genius".

== Legacy ==
Aderca left an enduring trace in the autobiographical writings of authors from Sebastian to Lovinescu, and from Eftimiu to Camil Petrescu. Lovinescu's notes and diaries, published decades after his death, offer a parallel intimate record of his friendship with Aderca: from a claim (disputed by Petrescu) that Aderca's automobile was of poor quality to detailed records of how his literary circle received his and Sanda Movilă's works, publicly read by them at Sburătorul sessions. According to these notes, the Sburătorul leader was also closely informed about the troubles Aderca faced in his married life. Aderca is also present in the writings of Lucia Demetrius, his contribution to the culture of Oltenia fondly recorded by Petre Pandrea. Meanwhile, Aderca's failings as a translator, and gibes at his literary style, were addressed by satirist Păstorel Teodoreanu, to whom Aderca was "a literary parvenu".

The communists' selective permissiveness took a toll on Aderca's legacy. During the 1950s, only his biography of Christopher Columbus was available in bookstores, with younger readers seemingly convinced that Aderca was a one-book author. After his death, other works were published individually or collectively: Murmurul cuvintelor ("The Murmur of Words", collected poems, 1971), Răzvrătirea lui Prometeu ("Prometheus' Rebellion", 1974), Teatru ("Drama", 1974), Contribuții critice ("Contributions to Criticism", 1983 and 1988), Oameni și idei ("Men and Ideas", 1983). In 1966, Orașele înecate was reprinted as Orașe scufundate, following Aderca's own command. Translated into German, it became somewhat familiar to an international public.

Several other editions of Aderca's works saw print after the 1989 Revolution: Femeia cu carne albă, Zeul iubirii and Revolte, as well as a 2003 Editura Hasefer reprint of Mărturia unei generații. Also issued were his full biography of Peter the Great and the Oameni excepționali collection. His life and work were the object of several monographs, several of which were authored and published by Zalis. Still, interest in his work declined dramatically over the following period, although some disciples of his, including the poet and translator Petre Solomon, were still active.

According to Pârvulescu, Aderca, the "protean writer", was "placed on the margin" by 21st century critics. Commemorations were held by Jewish Romanian representative bodies, such as the 2008 ceremony 2008 hosted by Zalis. According to Gheorghe Grigurcu, the antisemitic interpretation of Aderca's contributions survive in the post-Revolution essays of Mihai Ungheanu, one of the literary critics already familiar as an ideologue of nationalist protochronism.

Felix Aderca was survived by his son Marcel. Himself a noted translator, Marcel was an editor of his father's work and was a caretaker of his estate. In keeping with Felix Aderca's last wish, he inventoried the manuscripts and photographs in this collection and, in 1987, donated the entire corpus to the Romanian Academy. His own contribution as an editor and biographer includes a collection of his father's thoughts on the topic of antisemitism: F. Aderca și problema evreiască ("F. Aderca and the Jewish Question", published by Editura Hasefer in 1999). A branch of the Aderca family, descending from the writer's brother, still exists in Israel, where his name was assigned to an annual prize granted by the Association of Romanian-language Israeli Writers.
