= Sergiu Dan =

Romanian writer (1903–1976)

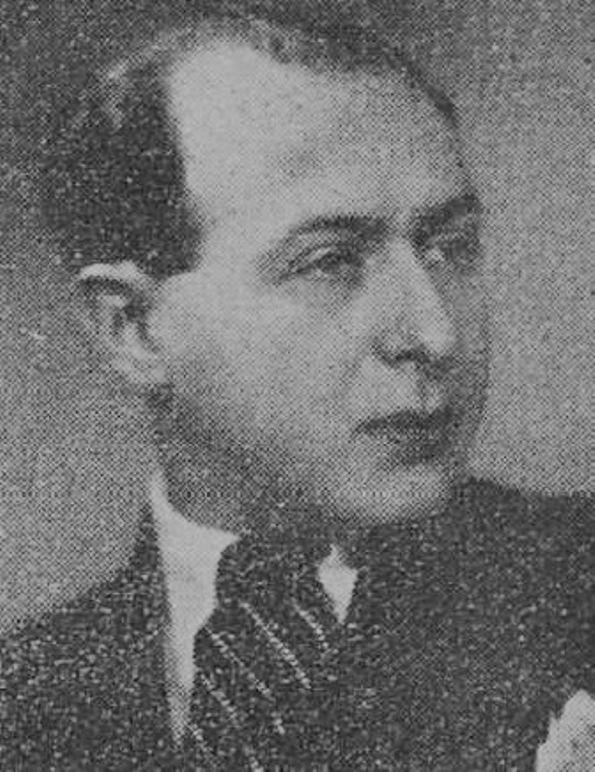
- Dan, before 1935
- Born: Isidor Rotman; December 29, 1903; Piatra Neamț, Romania
- Died: March 13, 1976 (aged 72); Bucharest, Romania
- Occupations: novelist, short story writer, journalist, poet, playwright, translator
- Writing career
- Period: c. 1925–1970
- Genres: biographical novel, collaborative fiction, comedy, experimental literature, genre fiction, historical novel, political novel, psychological novel, thriller, documentary novel, novella, parody, free verse
- Literary movement: Modernism, Avant-garde, Futurism, Contimporanul, Sburătorul, Socialist realism

Sergiu Dan (Romanian pronunciation: [ˈserd͡ʒju dan]; born Isidor Rotman or Rottman; December 29, 1903 – March 13, 1976) was a Romanian novelist, journalist, Holocaust survivor and political prisoner of the communist regime. Dan, the friend and collaborator of Romulus Dianu, was noted during the interwar period as a contributor to Romania's avant-garde and modernist scene, collaborating with poet Ion Vinea on Contimporanul review and Facla newspaper. He was also affiliated with the rival literary club, Sburătorul, and noted for criticizing the communist sympathies of other avant-garde writers. His main works of the 1930s include contributions to the psychological novel, thriller and political novel genres, received with critical acclaim.

Of Jewish Romanian origin, Sergiu Dan was the subject of antisemitic defamation, and during World War II was deported to Transnistria. After his return home, Dan spoke about his experiences in the book Unde începe noaptea ("Where Night Begins"), which endures one of the few Romanian contributions to Holocaust literature, and has for long been censored by dictatorial regimes. The writer's political stance also clashed with the post-1948 communist establishment, and, during the 1950s, he was interned at Aiud prison. Dan was eventually forced to adapt his writing style to the aesthetic requirements of Romanian Socialist realism, and spent the final decades of his life in relative obscurity. His work was rediscovered and reassessed following the 1989 Revolution.

== Biography ==
=== Early decades ===
The future writer was born in the town of Piatra Neamț, in Moldavia region, the son of Simon Rotman. His first steps in cultural journalism happened before 1926, when he was affiliated with the newspaper Cugetul Românesc; his earliest poems were published in cultural magazines such as Chemarea and Flacăra, and a debut novella, Iudita și Holofern ("Judith and Holofernes"), saw print in 1927. Sergiu Dan's brother, Mihail Dan, was also a journalist, known for his translations from Soviet author Vladimir Mayakovsky.

In the late 1920s, Sergiu Dan and his friend Romulus Dianu were in Bucharest. It was there that Dan joined the literary circle of novelist Camil Petrescu, and took part in the regular literary disputes at Casa Capșa and Corso restaurants. By 1928, he had fallen out with Petrescu: ridiculing the "noocratic" philosophical project outlined by Petrescu, and calling its author "insane" and "poltroonish". He later expressed regret for the incident, noting that he had been especially amused by Petrescu's eccentric decision to store his philosophical manuscript in the Vatican Library.

Dan and Dianu were also co-opted by Ion Vinea on his various journalistic ventures, beginning with the left-wing and modernist literary review Contimporanul, where they published avant-garde prose and poetry with a political subtext. His texts were featured in various other venues: Vremea, Revista Fundațiilor Regale, Universul Literar (the literary supplement of Universul daily) and Bilete de Papagal (the satirical newspaper of poet Tudor Arghezi). During the period, Dan underwent formal training in Economics, graduating from the Bucharest Commercial School. With Dianu (who was also making his debut), Dan co-authored a romanticized biography of the 19th century poet-storyteller Anton Pann: Viața minunată a lui Anton Pann ("The Wonderful Life of Anton Pann"; Editura Cultura Națională, 1929)—this collaborative fiction piece was reissued in 1935 as Nastratin și timpul său ("Nasreddin and His Time"). In this context, Dan also joined the Sburătorul club, formed around the eponymous magazine of literary theorist Eugen Lovinescu, as one of the Jewish writers whom Lovinescu welcomed into his movement.

During his period at Contimporanul, Dan embarked on a conflict with the Surrealist and far leftist group at unu, the magazine of poet Sașa Pană. This controversy reflected the major discrepancies between Contimporanul and other avant-garde venues. By 1930, Sergiu's brother Mihail Dan had left Bilete de Papagal and had become involved with unu, of which he was later editor in chief. However, documents first made public in 2008 show that he was secretly an informant for the Kingdom of Romania's intelligence agency, Siguranța Statului, with a mission to supervise unu's ongoing flirtations with communism. He had for long been suspected of this by the literary society at Sburătorul. Also in 1930, shortly after the forceful return of Romanian King Carol II to the throne, Sergiu Dan was working, as political editor, on the staff of Dreptatea, the platform of the National Peasants' Party (PNȚ). According to the later account of communist journalist Petre Pandrea, Dan and Vinea together stole the original draft of an article by PNȚ economist Virgil Madgearu, and forged it in such manner as to make it seem that Madgearu was an anti-Carlist; they then sold a copy to Madgearu's rival, the corporatist theorist Mihail Manoilescu. Manoilescu took a copy of this document to Carol, discrediting himself when the forgery was exposed. Pandrea claimed that, between them, Dan and Vinea made off with 150,000 lei from the affair, whereas their victim Manoilescu fell into permanent disfavor.

Sergiu Dan's actual editorial debut came in 1931, when Editura Cugetarea published his novel Dragoste și moarte în provincie ("Love and Death in the Provinces"). In 1932, Dan and dramatist George Mihail Zamfirescu shared the annual prize of the Romanian Writers' Society, of which they both became members. In 1932, Sergiu Dan joined the staff of Vinea's gazette Facla, with novelist Ion Călugăru, poet N. Davidescu, writer-director Sandu Eliad, and professional journalists Nicolae Carandino and Henric Streitman.

Dan resumed his writing career with Arsenic, published by Cultura Națională in 1934, and Surorile Veniamin ("The Veniamin Sisters", Editura Vatra, 1935). The former volume received another cultural prize, granted by literary critics at the Eforie festival of 1934. During 1934, Dan was one of 46 intellectuals who signed an appeal in favor of normalizing relations between Romania and its communist enemy to the east, the Soviet Union—the basis for a cultural and political association, Amicii URSS, which was secretly maneuvered by the outlawed Romanian Communist Party.

=== Between Transnistria and Aiud ===
Sergiu Dan became a victim of antisemitic repression during the early stages of World War II, when authoritarian and fascist regimes took over (see Romania during World War II). Initially, he was expelled from the Writers' Society. In July 1940, writing for Universul Literar, fascist author Ladmiss Andreescu proposed a boycott of Dan's work, and an overall ban on Jewish literature. Under the National Legionary State, some authors sympathetic to the ruling Iron Guard celebrated its enforcement of censorship as a revolution against modernist literature. In their magazine Gândirea, Dan was referred to as an exponent of "Judaic morbidity". Dan escaped the Pogrom of January 1941, hidden and protected by his friend Vinea.

Later, the new dictatorial government of Conducător Ion Antonescu listed Dan as one of the Jewish authors specifically banned, on a special inventory with nationwide circulation. Dan was also among the Jewish men and women who were deported to concentration camps in Romanian-administered Transnistria (see Holocaust in Romania); he was eventually released and could return to Bucharest, where he was under treatment with the Jewish physician and fellow writer Emil Dorian, before the August 1944 Coup managed to topple Antonescu.

Dealing with his Transnistrian deportation, the novel Unde începe noaptea was published by Editura Naționala Mecu in 1945. The book, written as a response to early signs of Holocaust denial, was reportedly taken out of circulation for unknown reasons; it was later suggested that it clashed with the Communist Party agenda, at a time when Romania was undergoing fast communization. Two years later, Naționala Mecu released another one of Dan's war-themed novels, Roza și ceilalți ("Roza and the Others").

After 1948, Sergiu Dan's political views collided with the agenda set by the Romanian communist regime, and he was eventually arrested. Reportedly, Dan had first attracted political persecution upon himself when, in 1947, he spoke out as a defense witness at the trial of his friend, the PNȚ journalist Nicolae Carandino. The Securitate secret police confiscated his works in progress, which reputedly formed part of a special secret archive. The conditions of Dan's new detainment were characterized by literary historian Henri Zalis as "savage". He was notably held, with many other public figures of various backgrounds, at Aiud prison. Petre Pandrea, himself imprisoned there after an inner-party purge, later included Dan on his list of writers, humorously titled the "Writers' Union of Aiud"—in contrast to the communist-controlled Writers' Union of Romania. Dianu, who had worked with Vinea and controversial journalist Pamfil Șeicaru during the war years, was also in custody by 1950, as one of the journalists charged with having tarnished "the world's luminous transformation on the path toward the justest regime in the history of mankind".

Dan was eventually released around 1955, when, according to Zalis (a personal witness to the events, alongside novelist Zaharia Stancu), he confided to fellow members of the official Writers' Union about his time in prison. The Union later exposed Dan to sessions of "self-criticism", forcing him to comply with the demands of Socialist realism (see Socialist realism in Romania). His later bibliography includes: Taina stolnicesei ("The Stolnik Woman's Secret"), published by Editura de stat pentru literatură și artă (ESPLA) in 1958 and Tase cel Mare ("Tase the Great"), Editura pentru literatură, 1964.

In 1970, Editura Minerva republished Roza și ceilalți and Arsenic, while Cartea Românească printed his last volume, Dintr-un jurnal de noapte ("From a Nightly Diary"). That year, in protest against communist censorship, Dan refused to accept the Meritul Cultural medal. He also concentrated on his translator's activity, being noted for his rendition of Madame Bovary and Salammbô, the classical works of French novelist Gustave Flaubert. His overall contribution also covers Romanian-language versions of works by Louis Aragon, Michel Droit, Maurice Druon, Anatole France, Boris Polevoy, Elsa Triolet and Voltaire. In 1973, he was interviewed by the young literary critics Ileana Corbea and Nicolae Florescu for the volume Biografii posibile ("Possible Biographies").

== Work ==
=== Early contributions ===
The earliest literary contributions by Sergiu Dan are generally small-scale narratives about provincial life, which often lead to a fiery and unexpected climax. Those fragments published by Contimporanul in the 1920s have been included by researcher Paul Cernat in a special group of "iconoclastic" and absurdist short prose (with those of Dianu, F. Brunea-Fox, Filip Corsa or Sandu Tudor). His experimental prose fragment Rocambole was a parody of Pierre Alexis Ponson du Terrail's 19th century series (and of literary conventions in general): although only covering half a page, it carried the subtitle "grand adventure novel", and showed its eponymous anti-hero as an incestuous kleptomaniac. The inspiration behind this format, similar to those employed by Dianu and the others, was the avant-garde hero Urmuz. According to Cernat, the Contimporanul writers borrowed Urmuz's manner of toying with the expectations of traditional readers, but were less interested than him in preserving an implicit social message. Cernat illustrates this conclusion with Dan's free verse "diary-poem", published in Issue 71 of Contimporanul, a sample of "cynical libertinism" and "absolute aesthetic freedom":

mai plăcut: moartea pentru rochie
decât pentru steag

Translation:

more pleasant: a death for the skirt
than for the flag

A triple issue of Contimporanul (96-97-98 for 1931) featured Dan and Dianu's text for the stage, Comedie în patru acte ("A Comedy in Four Acts"). Cernat finds that it is a "timid" version of Futurist writings by Filippo Tommaso Marinetti, comparable to similar contributions by A. L. Zissu.

Dan's style became more personal during his affiliation with Sburătorul and his earliest novels, although, Henri Zalis notes, he was more eclectic than other Sburătorists. Researcher and critic Ovid Crohmălniceanu finds that Sergiu Dan was one of the psychological novelists who, following Sburătorul's critique of social determinism and praise of the liberated urban intellectual, focused primarily (and, in Crohmălniceanu's opinion, excessively) on the refined "erotic obsessions" of exceptional individuals. He therefore places Dan in a group of Sburătorists which also includes Felix Aderca, Isaia Răcăciuni, Mihail Celarianu and Dan Petrașincu. In his 1941 synthesis of Romanian literature, academic George Călinescu described the post-1931 novels written separately by Dianu and Dan as rather similar, with the exception that Dan's were the products of "a more organized industry"; both authors, he argues, remained "highly conventional" in applying to Romania the genre fiction equivalent of Hollywood films.

Overall, Crohmălniceanu notes, Sergiu Dan had an "offhand narrative style, moving around with ease, the same as [fellow novelist] Cezar Petrescu, in quite varied environments. A certain analytical lucidity [of his] betrays [...] an additional interest for the mystery of psychological mechanisms within his heroes' actions". The shock value of avant-garde and libertinism is preserved in some of Dan's 1930s novels. Călinescu wrote that his characters generally lack "even the slightest notion of virtue", their "flimsy mentality" being the reason why Dan's novels always resemble "comedies". However, according to Crohmălniceanu, Dan's "sharp intelligence", "delicate observation" and love of aphorism compensated for "the lack of any prolonged moral discretion."

While the Anton Pann narrative earned appreciation for freely mixing picturesque elements into a historical novel framework, Dan's solo debut with Dragoste și moarte... takes direct inspiration from Gustave Flaubert. The book is seen by Ovid Crohmălniceanu as "a good reconstruction of a particular human ambiance, with a suggestion regarding the forms of Bovarysme that envelop [the provincial] setting." The more complex Arsenic can be read, according to Crohmălniceanu, as both a thriller populated with "dubious" figures and, "under careful reading", a study "on the petty cowardice of existence." The protagonist is a physician who renounces his professional standard, assists his friend, the simple giant Bibi, in plotting the murder of a common enemy, and then lives to regret his deed, while, at the same time, he betrays Bibi's confidence by pursuing an affair with his wife Ana; Ana however cheats on both men with the president of an insurance company. Călinescu remarks that the novel was constructed with an "intelligent" rhythm of suspense and humor, noting the "fantasy" invested in the secondary plots and characters: the colonel who dies obsessing about fodder, his bourgeois daughters, or the coroner who constructs absurd theories about criminal behavior. Arsenic received high praise from Crohmălniceanu: "The book is written with much confidence, it displays remarkable intellectual detachment, fine Voltairian irony and an ingenious, irreproachable, counterpoint construction."

In Surorile Veniamin, Dan's political novel, the narrative follows the symmetrical lives of two sisters: Felicia, who rejects social conformity and braves a life of poverty; and Maria, who works in the thriving oil industry and then becomes a kept woman. The plot is complicated by Felicia's affair with agitator Mihai Vasiliu, a Romanian Communist Party member who is pursued by Siguranța Statului agents, and who hides in Maria's apartment. Călinescu rated the more "serious" book as inferior to the "flighty verve" of Arsenic. Crohmălniceanu believes the book displays qualities similar to Arsenic's, but notes that Vasiliu's ultimate arrest, which leaves both sisters unconsoled, leads the outcome into a "disappointingly inconsistent" solution.

=== Unde începe noaptea and later works ===
With Unde începe noaptea, Sergiu Dan spoke about his own experience as a victim of Nazism and of Ion Antonescu's regime, with additional detail on the January 1941 Pogrom. The book carries a motto from the freethinker Léon Bloy: "Only Jewish tears are the heaviest. Theirs is the weight of many centuries." Centered on Jewish industrialist David Bainer, the narrative progresses over the slow degeneration into racial antisemitism, culminating in deportation.

Crohmălniceanu noted: "In grave pitch, the author manages, against previous expectations, to write a book as yet unparalleled in our literature, about Nazi extermination camps". Literary critic John Neubauer and his co-authors listed Sergiu Dan among the few East-Central European authors to have been caught up in wartime "carnage" and survived (their list also includes, for Romania, political prisoner Tudor Arghezi and Holocaust survivor Elie Wiesel). They describe Unde începe... as "a documentary novel about life in the concentration camp", one of the first-generation East-Central European books to deal with the World War II tragedy. The category places Dan among Yugoslavs Vladimir Dedijer, Vladimir Nazor and Viktor Novak; Czechoslovaks Ján Bodenek, Jan Drda, Miloš Krno and Jozef Horák; Polish Kazimierz Brandys, Hungarian Ernő Szép and Bulgarian Iordan Velchev. This view is contrasted by poet and critic Boris Marian, who finds that the narrative, which displays "impressive realism" and "alert style", is not documentary, but rather personal; according to him, although briefly showing communists at work, Unde începe... goes against its time by not presenting them in an ideal light. According to Henri Zalis, Dan's account forms "an ample novella" about "the inferno of a Nazi camp".

In Roza și ceilalți, the libertine daughter of a Jewish tailor is persuaded by her coreligionists into accepting the sexual advances of a Nazi German officer. Called a "tragic buffoonery" by George Călinescu (in an updated version of his 1941 overview), the narrative culminates with the German retreat, after which Roza, branded a collaborator, is tortured and raped by her own community.

Essentially an anti-communist, Dan refused to comply with the requirements imposed on literature by the Socialist realist establishment during the late 1940s. However, giving in to political pressure after his return from jail, he produced Tase cel Mare: called an "accessible" and "simplistic" novel by Zalis, it is thematically linked to the world depicted in Surorile Veniamin.

== Legacy ==
Essayist and literary historian Barbu Cioculescu recalled that Dan, "an excellent writer and man of character", was vilified in the 1940s by a "wretched epigram". The antisemitic rhyme went as follows:

După nume, Sergiu Dan
N-ai zice că e jidan.
După chip și-obrăznicie
Nu se poate să nu fie.

Translation:

With a name like Sergiu Dan
You wouldn't think he'd be a kike.
With his features and his sass
He couldn't be anything but.

During the antisemitic censoring and deportation of Sergiu Dan, George Călinescu still defied the political restrictions. His work still included literary profiles of Dan and other Jewish Romanian writers. This gesture of goodwill was acknowledged by Dan. He spoke to Emil Dorian about the Antonescu regime's attempt to circulate an alternative, antisemitic, Romanian literature tract, overseen by Ion Petrovici. Călinescu's defiance was perceived as an outrage by Romania's fascist periodicals. The newspaper Porunca Vremii called for Călinescu to be punished for his attack on "the cleanliness of the Romanian soul". It asserted that Jewish writers, Dan included, had no part to play in Romanian culture. The same was stated in Gândirea. It argued that, in reviewing Dan and the others, Călinescu had soiled the "Romanian blood that was shed under the pointy claw of the Talmud".

After renewed communist censorship, Sergiu Dan's work was again given consideration in Communist Romania during the 1960s liberalization episode. However, researcher Radu Ioanid notes, his references to the Holocaust were uncomfortable subjects for the national communist apparatus. Ioanid speaks about "selective censorship" on Romanian Holocaust literature, with Dan being one of the few authors whose works on the topic remained publishable. Some other such exceptions are Camil Baltazar, Maria Banuș, Aurel Baranga, F. Brunea-Fox, Eusebiu Camilar, Georgeta Horodincă, Alexandru Ivasiuc, Norman Manea, Sașa Pană and Titus Popovici. A reprint of Unde începe noaptea was still not possible, even though Carandino, newly released from prison, pleaded on this issue with communist President Nicolae Ceaușescu.

After the Romanian Revolution of 1989, Dan remained largely unknown to the Romanian public. Boris Marian wrote in 2006: "more gifted, we believe, than any one of his better-known colleagues, [Sergiu Dan] is a name rarely mentioned nowadays." Henri Zalis took special care to republish and reevaluate the early work of Sergiu Dan and other Jewish Romanians, a conscious effort to reduce the impact of antisemitic or communist repression. According to fellow critic Ovidiu Morar, this reevaluation of the political aspect was groundbreaking, and "worthy of appreciation". Cultural journalist Iulia Deleanu also noted that, in his treatment of Dan and other persecuted Jewish writers of that generation, Zalis acted as a "diagnostician". Of Dan's contribution, Zalis noted: "[it] must not be forgotten [since] it speaks of an experienced tragedy, one that is inseparable from the history of [his] century. A history that belongs to us, once it is no longer overlooked." During Bookfest 2006, Zalis and Editura Hasefer, the Jewish Romanian publishing house, released a critical edition of Unde începe noaptea.
