= Mihail Celarianu =

Romanian writer (1893–1985)

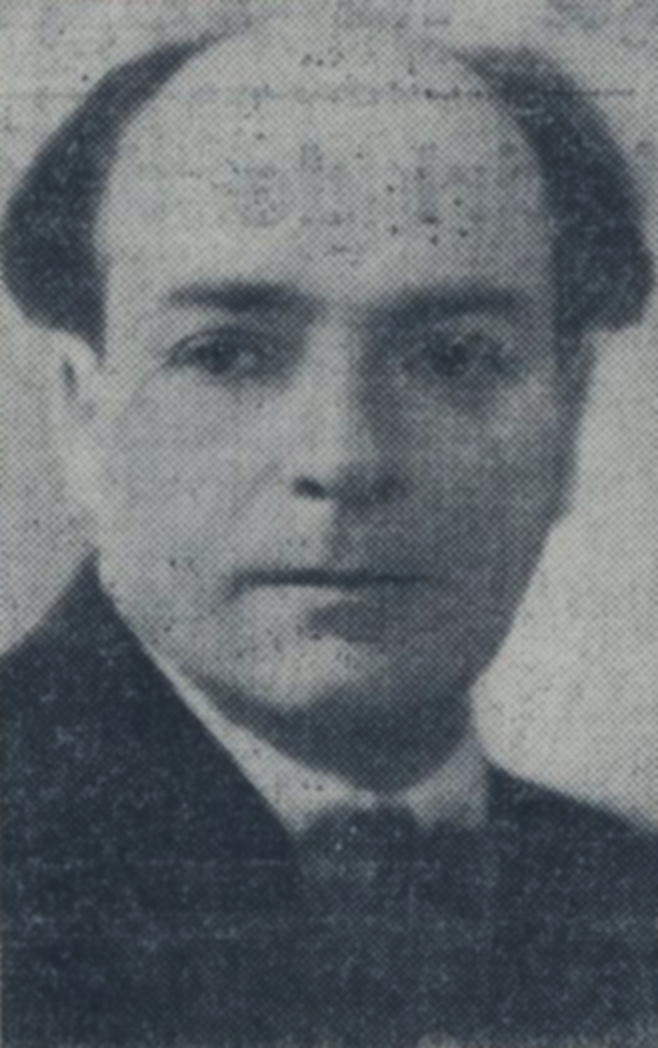
- Celarianu, c. 1934
- Born: August 1, 1893; Bucharest, Kingdom of Romania
- Died: December 5, 1985 (aged 92)
- Occupations: Professional writer; editor; clerk; trade unionist
- Relatives: Alexandru Macedonski (father-in-law)
- Writing career
- Period: 1905–1985
- Genres: Lyric poetry; autobiographical novel; biographical novel; epistolary novel; erotic literature; satire; sketch story; epigram; collaborative fiction; children's literature; memoir
- Movements: Symbolism (Romanian); Sburătorul; Modernist literature

Mihail Celarianu or Celerianu (August 1, 1893 – December 5, 1985) was a Romanian poet and novelist. Though he wrote his first poems at the age of twelve, and had them published at thirteen, he was initially trained as a musician at the Bucharest Conservatory. He then contemplated a medical career, and studied for a degree in Paris, but returned hurriedly to still-neutral Romania upon the start of World War I; his early literary contribution include some rousing up support for the Entente Powers. The Ententist campaign was successful, and Romania declared war in 1916. Celarianu volunteered to serve in the Romanian Army, seeing action with the infantry at Predeal Pass, before being accepted into an auxiliary position by the Air Corps. His experiences influenced his autobiographical novels, as well as a play.

Celarianu was a late recruit of the Romanian Symbolist movement. He befriended and emulated the Symbolist doyen, Alexandru Macedonski, becoming his posthumous son-in-law and keeper of his archive. In tandem, he worked alongside fellow writer-clerks such as Ion Minulescu and Felix Aderca, first at the Arts and Religious Affairs Ministry, and later at the Labor Ministry. Publishing volumes of Symbolist poetry which drew notice and won him awards presented by the Romanian Writers' Society, he made his debut as a novelist with a work which poked fun at his own bureaucratic career. It was hailed in his lifetime as an important contribution to Romanian humor, and likened to works by the country's classical satirist, Ion Luca Caragiale. At that stage in his career, he joined the Sburătorul group of modernists, being welcomed by its leader, Eugen Lovinescu, as a "seraph" of Romanian poetry. In 1936, Celarianu expanded modernism into the realm of erotic literature, publishing the controversial novel Femeia sângelui meu ("The Woman in My Blood"); as a result, he became one of the "pornographers" singled out by traditionalist moral crusaders, including Nicolae Iorga.

Before and during World War II, Celarianu returned to more conventional prose, publishing in the realm of children's literature. Like Lovinescu and Tudor Arghezi, between whom he networked, he opposed Ion Antonescu's government from liberal positions; immediately after the anti-Antonescu coup of 1944, he joined the new left-leaning leadership of the Writers' Society, serving as general secretary of that syndicate to 1949. The Romanian communist regime tolerated him as a fellow traveler, and, from the 1960s, allowed a more complete recovery of the entire Sburătorul movement. Well-received as a translator of 19th- and 20th-century French literature, Celarianu continued to write poetry of his own, returning with a new collection in 1966, when he was aged 73. He put out poetry and memoirs down to February 1985—though much of his output remained unpublished by the time of his death; by then, he had destroyed his large-scale biographical novel, having also misplaced his lifelong diaries.

== Biography ==
=== Early life and military service ===
The future poet was born at Calea Plevnei 232, in downtown Bucharest, capital of the Romanian Kingdom. His birth date was recorded as August 1, 1893, though some sources have July 30. He was the third of eight children born to Constantin Celarianu, an Army officer, and his wife Antoaneta (née Pricup). An older brother served with distinction in the Army, reaching the rank of general by 1985. The family's more distant origins were in the southwestern Romanian region of Oltenia, specifically in Celaru, Romanați County (later absorbed into Dolj County). Celarianu was included in Florea Firan's anthologies of Oltenian writers, and, according to critic Șerban Cioculescu, was "perhaps the most refined among Oltenia's interwar poets". He spent his childhood in Bucharest, at a new Celarianu home on Teleajen Street; he was encouraged by his parents to do gardening work on the family plot, and was passionate about singing and reading.

After middle and high school in Bucharest and Brăila, Mihail took a technical course of study at the Conservatory, hoping to launch a career in vocal music, as a tenor. He had prepared for an extended study trip in Italy, but eventually abandoned this career path and, according to his brother, was "obsessed by the thought of his having failed as a musician." Celarianu had begun writing poems at the age of twelve, making his debut in Duminica in 1906, aged thirteen. His first book, Poeme și proză ("Poems and Prose"), appeared in 1913; according to the poet and literary critic Toma Grigorie, it was a "juvenile and unconvincing" effort. Among the literary historians, Ion Rotaru listed these as "poems with religious concepts", which gave way to works more specifically dealing with "neurotic solitude", reminiscent of George Bacovia's. At that moment in his life, Celarianu was studying medicine in Paris (1912–1914) with a stipend from his childless aunt, Ecaterina Hagiescu. He was also taking an interest in philosophy, becoming a passionate follower of Gabriel Séailles' lectures at the University of Paris. The young man returned home upon the outbreak of World War I, sailing from Marseille to Constanța.

In September 1914, after speaking at the funeral of poet Mircea Demetriade, Celarianu was personally greeted by the Symbolist doyen Alexandru Macedonski, and also met his daughter, Nina. They became friends, though Celarianu never attended Macedonski's literary and mystical circle in Dorobanți, explaining in 1979 that he had reserves toward "improvised" and "declamatory" poetry. Celarianu became involved with those Romanian nationalists who suggested an alliance with the Entente Powers—against the neutralists and Germanophiles. His feelings were expressed in the poem Cînt Războinic ("War Song"), which was put to music by Traian Justinian Popovici and performed for the public in October 1915. The young man enlisted for duty after Romania entered the war in 1916. He was originally an infantryman with the 6th Regiment, seeing action in the Battle of Predeal Pass. After attending the Pipera-based bombardiers' school, he was assigned to the Air Corps. According to various accounts, he was either an air observer or a gunner. The war inspired his play Drapelul ("The Flag"), which was staged in Onești.

Celarianu's career took off in interwar Greater Romania. In late 1920, Eugen Relgis' Umanitatea, published in Iași, hosted some of his poetry. Both the magazine and his contributions were panned in Înfrățirea, a provincial organ of the National Liberal Party: its columnist saw Umanitatea as politically unfrequentable, and Celarianu's verse as "not at all useful." Weeks later, Celarianu was among those who witnessed Macedonski's final moments. As he reported, the dying man acknowledged him as a "good boy" and a "talented youth". Immediately after, he personally handled an edition of Macedonskian verse, which appeared Poezii alese. He went on to marry Nina, moving in with her in her father's Dorobanți apartments and preserving the Macedonski archives (consulted in the 1940s by scholar Adrian Marino). Theirs was a "happy marriage", despite his only collecting a small salary as a clerk. From 1923 to 1929, he worked at Ion Minulescu's office in the Arts and Religious Affairs Ministry. Celarianu was himself a Symbolist of elegiac, sensual, or erotic tendencies, as exemplified by his poetry collections Drumul ("The Road", 1928) and Flori fără pace ("Restless Flowers", 1938). Most of the former's pieces had appeared in 1924–1925 in Perpessicius' magazine, Universul Literar.

=== Sburătorul and obscenity scandal ===
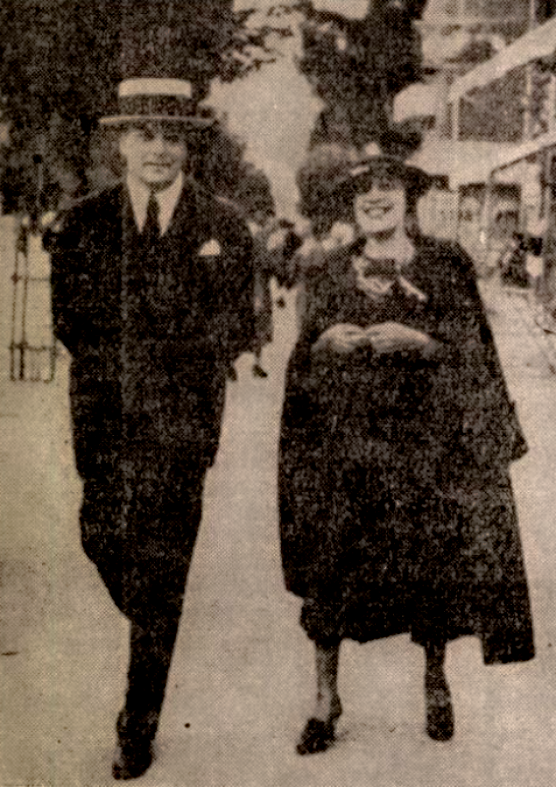
Celarianu and Nina Macedonski in Bușteni, 1936

Celarianu was also a regular customer of the Oteteleșeanu Restaurant and, following a suggestion by Tudor Vianu, began frequenting the Eugen Lovinescu-led Sburătorul circle; he was upheld by Lovinescu as one of his best finds, a "seraph descending among us men". As the group's poet laureate, Camil Baltazar similarly praised Celarianu as "anointed by God", a "true poet" of "somber and cloistered internalized vision." According to Grigorie, Lovinescu's pronouncement also reflected Celarianu's "multiple affinities" with the Sburătorists' take on modernist poetry. The same critic notes thematic links with Symbolists such as Macedonski and Dimitrie Anghel, but also argues that the Celarianu's "floral poetry" became "profoundly personal" in Flori fără pace. Similarly, Cioculescu proposes that Celarianu was close by, but also superior to, Anghel, while Rotaru proposes the contrary: "[Celarianu lacks] Anghel's flickering freshness".

Among later critics, Ion Marcoș dismissed Celarianu's work in verse as "slightly outdated Symbolism", rating him as a "background writer". Magazines that published his work include Flacăra, Viața Românească, Revista Fundațiilor Regale, and later România Literară. From 1929 to 1944, he was librarian and then specialist at the Labor, Health and Social Protection Ministry, where one of his office colleagues was Felix Aderca. He was inducted by the Romanian Writers' Society (SSR) in February 1929 (alongside Baltazar, Damian Stănoiu, and George Mihail Zamfirescu), winning its annual prize later that same year.

During the interwar period, Celarianu was a promoter of novels that analyzed situations through satire and especially eroticism. Critic George Călinescu observed that, overall, he had a tinge of "humanitarian sadness", evoking Georges Duhamel. Celarianu's experience as a ministry clerk informed his 1934 novel Polca pe furate ("The Thieving Polka"); published on the recommendation of Mihail Sebastian, it was a largely satirical work and continued a humorous streak in Romanian literature, as illustrated primarily by Ion Luca Caragiale. Critic Paul Daniel summarized it as a fresco of "the bureaucratic world, for the most part a world of the uncultured and the haughty"; largely written in the form of an epistolary novel, it showed its main protagonist, Pantahuzeanu, descending from romantic hero to regular pimp. Rotaru censured the work as "comedy of a rather facile kind", "mostly based on the illiteracy of suburbanite scoundrels, whose letters, pieced together, form the substance of [his] composition." Celarianu's winning of a second SSR prize in 1935 (shared with Horia Furtună) was criticized at the time by Dreptatea newspaper, which, in an unsigned editorial, suggested that the award should have gone to Panait Istrati, the "impoverished and humiliated" proletarian author.

Celarianu's work was meanwhile defended by the columnists at Facla, who argued that his Easter story, carried by Viața Literară in May 1935, was the only remarkable work out of "several kilograms of paschal literature". Fellow novelist N. Crevedia recalls seeing him at one or several Sburătorul sessions, where he appeared "as prudish as a girl." This did not prevent Celarianu from being identified as a pornographer by 1930s moral crusaders. The controversy relates to his 1936 novel Femeia sângelui meu ("The Woman in My Blood"), which he considered largely (though not fully) autobiographical, and which detailed his time in Paris. Of a "dense and acute erotic lyricism" and "frantic sexuality", it was criticized early on as an obscene work. Explicit episodes detail the sexual awakening of young girls and unsatisfied homemakers, as well as a threesome between the Romanian protagonist, Glineanu, and two French prostitutes.

Lovinescu defended such episodes as integral to the plot, and illustrating his own notion of art for art's sake; according to Rotaru, his stance was "questionable in this particular case." Among those who were fully dismissive of the work was Nicolae Iorga, the historian and traditionalist doctrinaire, who noted: "Mr Celerianu has authored a book in which he depicts a student having relations with a mother, a daughter, and an aunt. When we rose up and asked for such authors to be imprisoned, we found ourselves under attack." Călinescu was impressed by the novel's resolution, in which all women engaged in the amorous affairs agree to withdraw once Glineanu decides to begin a steady and faithful relationship with another girl. Reviewer Pompiliu Constantinescu appreciated the novelist for his "unsettling power" of narration, though he also criticized Femeia sângelui meu for its "commercial title", its accumulation of irrelevant details, and its recourse to old devices—such as the epistolary method and the found manuscript.

=== Later novels and World War II ===
Appearing in early 1936, Zâna izvorului sănătății ("The Fairy at the Source of Health"), was both a children's story and a work of collaborative fiction—the co-authors were novelist Jean Bart and Doctor Ygrec, the hygienist at Adevărul. It was a popularizing text, aimed at making school hygiene a more entertaining subject. By himself, Celarianu wrote another children's book, the 1939 Isprăvile lui Stan cel cuminte ("Stan the Wise and His Adventures"); later that year, he won another SSR prize. At the time, Romania had come under an authoritarian regime centered on Carol II. In January 1939, Celarianu joined Carol's National Renaissance Front, as part of a mass recruitment among SSR members.

World War I experiences are central to Celarianu's 1940 novel, Diamant verde ("Green Diamond"), which also illustrates its author's penchant for sensual love, though in a much more subdued form. As noted by Marcoș, it dispelled earlier apprehensions about Celarianu's work in prose, being universally acclaimed by critics of the day; however, Marcoș himself describes the work as a "laboratory product", missing out on an opportunity to depict the eroticized narratives in their social and historical setting. In 1943, when Romania was aligned with Nazi Germany under Ion Antonescu's regime, Sburătorul and the entire modernist school were being pushed out of the literary mainstream. Celarianu continued to express his support for Lovinescu, and helped ensure a line of communication between his terminally-ill mentor and the poet Tudor Arghezi, a former rival. He himself returned to publishing in 1944 with a volume of humorous sketches, Noaptea de fericire. Writing the following year, Baltazar noted that this collection had been generally ignored by the press, despite being one of the "genuinely good works, so rare to find in the current penury of humor." He found two stories to be evocative of Sholem Aleichem.

In August 1944, a successful anti-German and anti-Antonescu coup signaled a leftward shift in Romanian politics. On September 24, the SSR was reformed, with Victor Eftimiu and N. D. Cocea taking over. That same day, Celarianu and Eugen Jebeleanu were among those included on the syndicate's steering committee. From October, the poet was secretary of the Democratic Writers' Union, a reconstructed SSR headed by Eftimiu, which grouped fellow travelers of the Romanian Communist Party (PCR). He and Eftimiu, alongside Jebeleanu, were overseeing a purge of fascist writers—however, in December 1944, Ion Barbu, a one-time member of the Iron Guard, wrote to thank them for their leniency toward him.

Returning at Revista Fundațiilor Regale in March 1945, Celarianu found himself mocked in the PCR newspaper, România Liberă, for his "decadent and decaying" verse, standing as an "old man". On August 3, Celarianu appeared on Radio Romania to lecture about Macedonski as a "social writer". A month later, he and Eftimiu, alongside Arghezi, Baltazar, Mihai Beniuc, Scarlat Callimachi, Ion Jalea and Mihail Sadoveanu, paid homage to the Soviet writer Ilya Ehrenburg, who was visiting Bucharest; these festivities were organized by the Romanian Society for Friendship with the Soviet Union. In October, he joined Furtună, Alexandru Cazaban, Dumitru Corbea, Gala Galaction, Hilda Jerea and Zaharia Stancu on a SSR tour of factories, seeking to "raise the cultural level of the masses." He also returned to social hygiene in the new climate of communist rule—his story, Antonică cel curat ("All-clean Tony"), appeared in a Sănătatea Poporului issue of September 1948.

=== Under communism ===
Celarianu served as SSR secretary to 1949, but his state-pension rights were already being reviewed in December 1948. During communism, he lived at a villa on Iancului Highway 52, which had been assigned to him as a show of appreciation by the previous governments. This was still his recorded residence in the final stages of his life, down to his death in 1985; his wife had died in 1958. Celarianu personally handled her burial in the Macedonski grave, at Bellu cemetery, also setting aside a place for himself. Stancu, who visited the location in 1970, noted that: "[Celarianu] had written his name on the cross, but, thankfully for our literature, he still lives." The mid-1960s marked the return on the literary scene of various Lovinescu disciples, including Vladimir Streinu—one of Streinu's monographs was dedicated to Celarianu, whom he rediscovered as a poet of the "most burning cases in eroticism". In April 1965, interventions by Alexandru A. Philippide and Adrian Marino resulted in Celarianu's poetry being featured by Steaua magazine.

Celarianu returned as a poet in 1966, with Inima omenească ("The Human Heart"), comprising poetic cycles that he had left unpublished over the previous decades. According to Grigorie, these "completed [his] image as a poet of the internal ecstasy, of beatified states, [...] with visible tendencies of escaping into the fantastic and the miraculous." Another enthusiastic reviewer, Perpessicius, suggested that Inima omenească had revealed Celarianu to the public as a poet of "great musical expression". Also in 1966, Polca pe furate was scheduled for a reprint, and the Romanian Academy awarded Celarianu its Mihai Eminescu Prize. By the late 1970s, he had prepared two notebooks of memoirs, more sketches, epigrams, as well as a lyrical collection, Cîntarea Frumuseții ("A Song to Beauty"). Most of these reportedly remained unpublished, though his recollections about Lovinescu were occasionally printed. In July 1973, he was a guest speaker at a Lovinescu round-table, alongside Jebeleanu, I. Peltz, Cella Serghi, and Lucia Demetrius. As argued by essayist Alexandru George, Celarianu, alongside Baltazar, Stancu, and Simion Stolnicu, was unreasonably derisive of his erstwhile mentor, helping to transmit into posterity a "distorted" portrait of Lovinescu.

Throughout much of his life, Celarianu had written diaries, which he lost, as well as the 600-page novel, Cutremurul, which depicted figures such as Anghel, Arghezi, Minulescu and George Coșbuc under their real names, but which he had destroyed while in a state of "spiritual depression". He was also a noted translator, from Honoré de Balzac, Boris Polevoy (in collaboration) and Édouard de Keyser, and, Rotaru assesses, displayed a "remarkable talent" in his renditions from the "great French poets"—José-Maria de Heredia, Victor Hugo, Francis Jammes, Stéphane Mallarmé, Anna de Noailles, Henri de Régnier. In the early 1980s, he almost never left his home, preferring to look upon the Iancului crowds through his window. The only writers who still visited were Philippide and Al. Raicu, though he reportedly kept up with everything new in national and international literature (and, according to Raicu, had remained an "analyst of superlative finesse").

Celarianu only discontinued his writing, for health reasons, in February 1985, expressing regret that he could no longer find the strength to dictate on-the-spot translations from "beloved authors", including Heredia, Hugo, Jammes, Anatole France, Georges Rodenbach, or Albert Samain. He died shortly before the end of the year, on December 5, being survived for a while by his elder brother, the general. In 2019, the local authorities of Goiești, which is home to the ancestral Macedonski manor, announced its re-dedication as a memorial museum, with one room forming a permanent Celarianu exhibit.
