= Sanda Movilă =

Romanian poet and novelist

Sanda Movilă (pen name of Maria Ionescu-Aderca; January 7, 1900–September 13, 1970) was a Romanian poet and novelist.

Born in Cerbu, Argeș County, her parents were Ion Ionescu, a small-scale tradesman, and his wife Maria (née Niculescu). She attended middle and high school in Pitești from 1911 to 1919. In 1924, she graduated from the literature and philosophy faculty of the University of Bucharest, with a major in French. Subsequently, she was hired as a civil servant at the Ministry of Public Instruction. She was married to the writer Felix Aderca.

Her literary debut came in 1916, in Universul newspaper, with the anti-World War I poem "8 octombrie". She attracted notice from Eugen Lovinescu, to whom she owed both her pseudonym and her work being published in Sburătorul from 1921. Her first prose writing, Pata de umbră, appeared in Sburătorul literar in 1922; the same literary magazine also ran her pieces Viața, Cel din urmă vis and Gânduri. Her first book was the 1925 volume of poetry Crinii roșii. Other magazines that published her work: Curierul artelor, Lumea copiilor, Vremea, Revista Fundațiilor Regale, Adevărul literar și artistic, Veac nou, Flacăra, Viața Românească, România Literară and Luceafărul. Alone or in collaboration, she translated Paul Verlaine (Fêtes galantes), Leconte de Lisle (L'Epiphanie), Arkady Gaidar (Timur and His Squad), Lev Kassil (The Gladiator's Cup), Czesław and Alina Centkiewicz (Chelyuskin) and Gabriela Zapolska (Images). Movilă shifted between poetry (Crinii roșii, 1925; Călătorii, 1946; Fruct nou, 1948; Versuri 1966), story collections (Neuitatele călătorii, 1958; Câte se petrec pe mare, 1962) and novels (Desfigurații, 1935; Nălucile, 1945; Marele ospăț, 1947; Pe văile Argeșului, 1950; Viața în oglinzi, 1970). Throughout, she used her vivid imagination to draw clear, lifelike portraits of the past.
