= Ieronim Șerbu =

Romanian writer (1911–1972)

- Born: Aron Hers Erick; December 1, 1911; Botoșani, Romania
- Died: December 8, 1972
- Occupation: Prose writer
- Writing career
- Pen name: Aron Ciuntu
- Period: 1932–1972
- Notable works: Dincolo de tristețe; Oamenii visează pâine; Vițelul de aur; Rădăcinile bucuriei; Podul amintirilor

Ieronim Șerbu (pen name of Aron Hers Erick; December 1, 1911 – December 8, 1972) was a Romanian prose writer.

Born into a Jewish family in Botoșani, his parents were Avram Moise Erick and his wife Frieda Ruhla (née Segal). He attended Gheorghe Lazăr High School in the national capital Bucharest. From 1932 to 1943, he was a participant in the literary circle surrounding Sburătorul magazine. His first published work appeared in 1932 in Discobolul, a magazine he founded with Dan Petrașincu. He also wrote for Azi, Lumea, Viața Românească, Revista Fundațiilor Regale and Gazeta literară, early on using the pen name Aron Ciuntu.

Șerbu's first book was the 1940 short story collection Dincolo de tristețe. Two further story collections followed: Oamenii visează pâine (1945) and Vițelul de aur (1949), as well as the novels Rădăcinile bucuriei (1954) and Podul amintirilor (1963). An interesting memoir, Vitrina cu amintiri, appeared posthumously in 1973. His articles on literary themes were collected as Itinerarii critice (1971). Șerbu's early prose was analytical; after 1945 and the country's turn toward socialist realism, he adopted social and ethical themes. Despite rewriting texts subjected to various pressures, Șerbu did not manage to produce an artistically fulfilled body of work.
