= Vasile Demetrius =

Romanian prose writer, poet and translator (1878 - 1942)

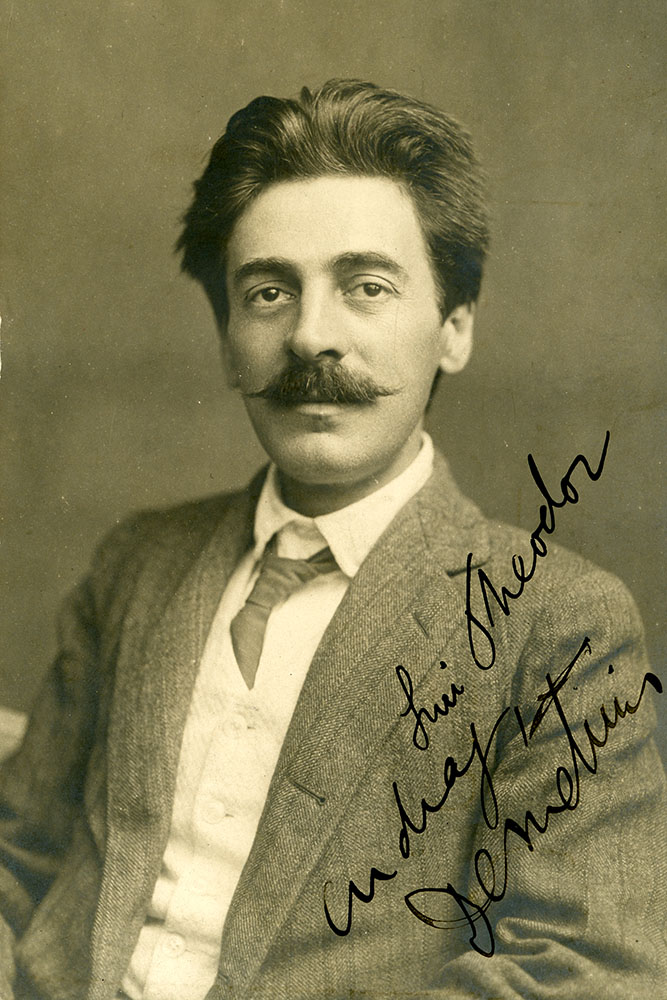
Vasile Demetrius

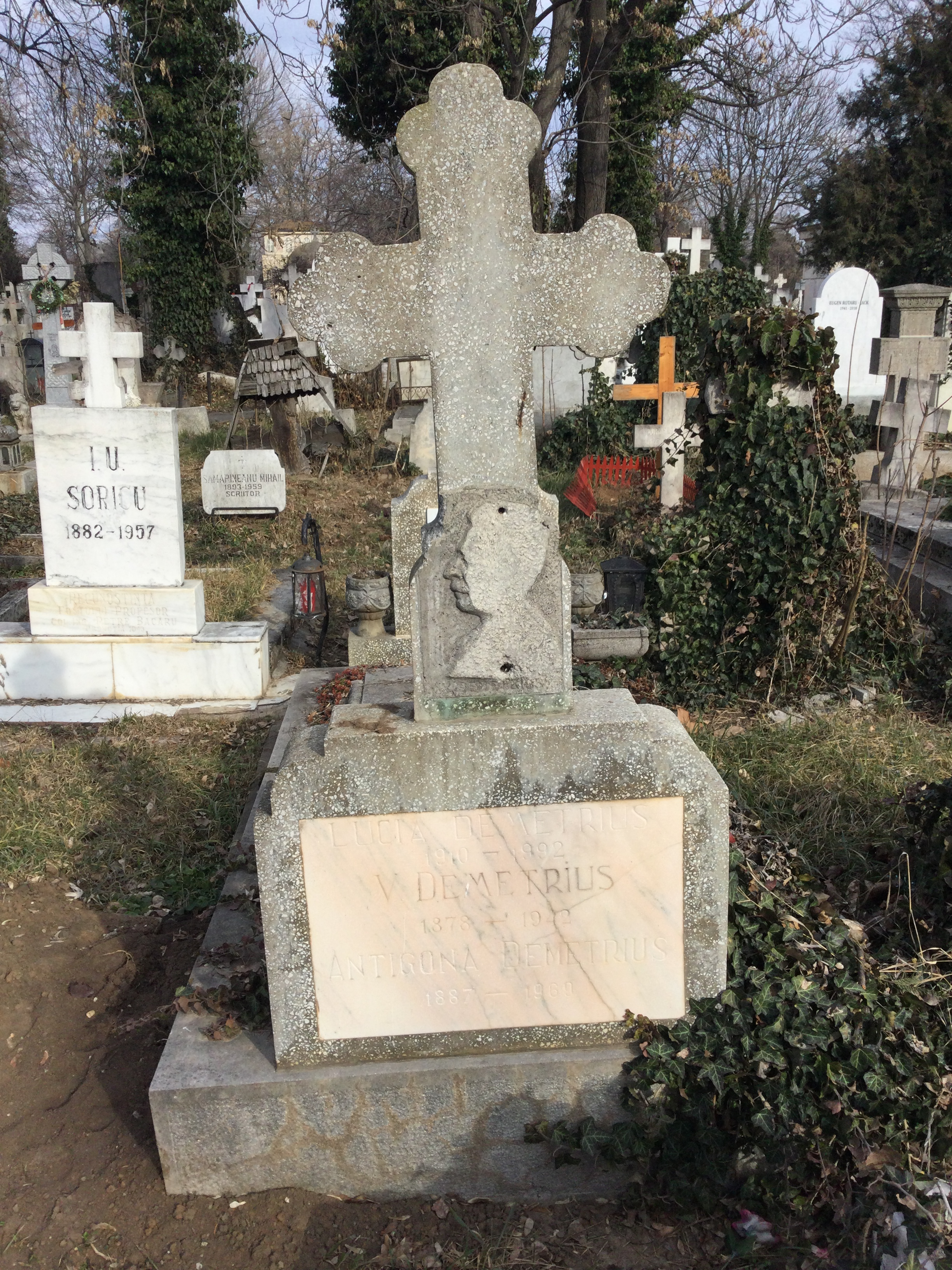
Grave in Bellu Cemetery

Vasile Demetrius (pen name of Vasile Dumitrescu; October 1, 1878 – March 15, 1942) was an Austro-Hungarian-born Romanian prose writer, poet and translator.

Born in Șcheii Brașovului, his parents were Dumitru Ogea, who built and maintained wood-burning stoves, and his wife Elisabeta (née Bratu-Stinghe). While in school, his name was changed to Dumitrescu, while the sobriquet Demetrius was bestowed upon him in 1899 by Gala Galaction, a classmate at Saint Sava High School, along with N. D. Cocea and Ion G. Duca. After leaving for the Romanian Old Kingdom, he attended primary school and three months of high school in Bucharest, but was largely self-taught. Early on, he forged a lifelong friendship with Tudor Arghezi; a humanitarian in outlook, he turned to socialism. His jobs included: worker in a garment factory; butcher's assistant; bookseller for C. Sfetea; proofreader at Naționalul newspaper; chemist at a Chitila factory; substitute teacher in Vintilă Vodă village, Buzău County; estate administrator for a count in Ialomița County; civil servant at the Domains Ministry; founder of Căminul book series (1916) and director at Biblioteca pentru toți (1923).

His poetic debut came in Constantin Mille's Adevărul. In 1904, together with Tudor Arghezi, he published Linia dreaptă magazine. He was close friends with Arghezi, Galaction and N. D. Cocea. Other publications where his work appeared include Viața socială, Viitorul, Dimineața, Facla, Flacăra, Scena, Luceafărul, Sburătorul and Rampa. He authored numerous translations of, among others, Guy de Maupassant, Honoré de Balzac, Dmitry Merezhkovsky, Blasco Ibáñez and Stendhal. His volumes of poetry are said to lack originality (Versuri, 1901; Trepte rupte, 1906; Sonete, 1914; Canarul mizantropului, 1916; Fecioarele, 1925; and Cocorii, 1942). However, his prose, in particular the novels (Tinerețea Casandrei, 1913; Orașul bucuriei, 1920; Domnul colonel, 1920; Domnul deputat, 1921), somewhat anticipate interwar realism. He also published a few volumes of short stories (Puterea farmecelor și alte nuvele, 1914; Cântăreața, 1916; Nuvele alese, 1925). He won a prize from the Romanian Academy in 1916 and from the Romanian Writers' Society in 1928.

Married to Antigona (née Rabinovici), a baptized Jew, he had a very poor household and numerous children. One of them, Lucia Demetrius, herself became a writer. Literary figures who visited the family home before 1918 included Oreste Georgescu, D. Nanu and Panait Istrati. By the 1920s, new visitors were arriving: Șerban Bascovici, Aron Cotruș, and later Felix Aderca and Sanda Movilă.
