= Carol Ardeleanu =

Romanian writer

Carol Ardeleanu (March 16, 1883–November 23, 1949) was a Romanian prose writer.

Born in Bucharest, his formal education was limited, finishing in the early years of high school. His first published work appeared in 1907 in Viața literară și artistică, followed by his first book, the 1918 collection of sketches and stories Rusia revoluționară. His short story collections (Pe străzile Iaşului, 1920; Rochia albă, 1921; În regatul nopții, 1923) as well as his novels (Diplomatul, tăbăcarul și actrița, 1926; Am ucis pe Dumnezeu, 1929; Casa cu fete, 1931; Viermii pământului, 1933; Pescarii, 1934; Viață de câine, 1937) primarily remain of interest for their documentary value. His writings appeared in Universul literar, Flacăra, Luceafărul, Cuvântul liber, Vremea and Sburătorul. I. Valerian observed that Ardeleanu was "the most authentic Bohemian figure". He was awarded the Romanian Writers' Society prize in 1926.
