= Anton Holban =

Romanian writer (1902–1937)

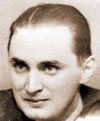

Anton Holban (Romanian pronunciation: [anˈton holˈban]; 10 February 1902, in Huşi – 15 January 1937, in Bucharest) was a Romanian novelist. He was the nephew of Eugen Lovinescu.

The son of Gheorghe Holban (whom had from his father’s side Germanic ancestry) and Antoaneta Lovinescu, he was a writer, French teacher and theoretician of the novel. He first read fragments of his novels at his uncle's literary club - Sburătorul, and this is considered to be his debut.

== Major works ==
=== Novels ===
- Romanul lui Mirel, 1929
- O moarte care nu dovedeşte nimic, 1931
- Parada dascălilor, 1932
- Ioana, 1934
- Jocurile Daniei (posthumous publication in 1971)
