= Lucia Demetrius =

Romanian novelist, poet, playwright and translator

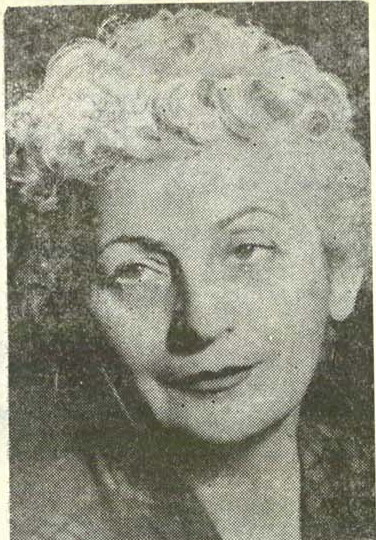
Lucia Aurora Demetrius

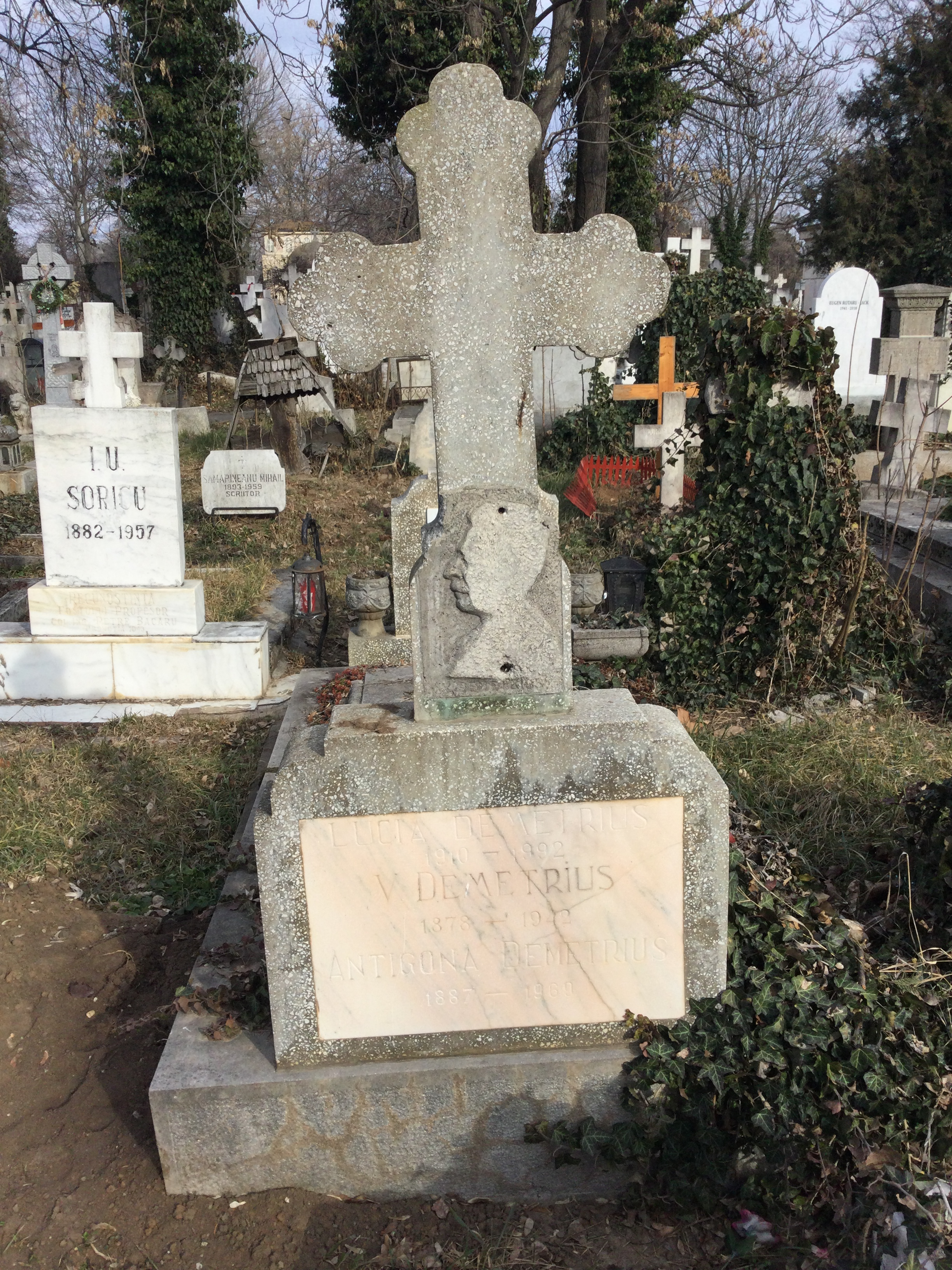
Grave in Bellu Cemetery

Lucia Aurora Demetrius (February 16, 1910–July 29, 1992) was a Romanian novelist, poet, playwright and translator.

== Life ==
Born in Bucharest, her parents were the writer Vasile Demetrius and his wife Antigona (née Rabinovici). Her father, to whom she was close, had attended Saint Sava High School, where one of his classmates was Ion G. Duca, who would become Lucia's godfather. Her mother was a baptized Jew; she had numerous siblings and the family was very poor. She attended the elite Maria Brâncoveanu central school from 1921 to 1928; its director, who became her mentor, was the widow of Barbu Ștefănescu Delavrancea. This was followed by the University of Bucharest, where she earned degrees in literature (1931) and philosophy (1932). A student at the Dramatic Arts Conservatory from 1928 to 1931, she had Ion Manolescu as a professor. She formed part of the Sburătorul literary circle. Asking Ion Marin Sadoveanu for help in finding a job, he sent her to act at Cernăuți, and would also appear at Brașov and Bucharest, always in minor roles.

Demetrius made her theatrical debut with the 13+1 company, founded by George Mihail Zamfirescu, for whom she developed an unrequited love. Considered too affected in her style to realize her ambition of becoming a successful actress, she left the stage after performing one last role in a play by Ferdinand Bruckner. In 1934, she began studying aesthetics in Paris, where she intended to take a doctorate under Charles Lalo, but returned home not long after. A promised scholarship had not arrived and she lacked the means to support herself, and was also disillusioned and ill. From 1936 to 1941 she was a clerk at the offices of Nicolae Malaxa, who facilitated a trip to Italy for her. During World War II and the attendant anti-Jewish laws, she feared persecution due to her background. Although her name was removed from a theatrical poster where she was listed as translator, she was allowed to join a large group of writers attending the inauguration of the Romanian theatre in Odessa, capital of the Transnistria Governorate. Over the course of the war, she worked as a nurse at a hospital for wounded soldiers, located in her former high school building; the activity would later draw criticism from the Romanian Communist Party. From 1944 to 1949, she taught at the workers' conservatory, was first secretary for the press at the Information Ministry between 1946 and 1949, and worked as a theatre director at Sibiu, Brașov and Bacău from 1950 to 1952.

== Works ==
Her writing debut came in 1933, with articles and literary fragments in Rampa and Adevărul literar și artistic. She submitted work for Vremea and for left-wing publications such as Cuvântul liber, and reviewed plays for Rampa and Evenimentul. Her first novel was the 1936 Tinerețe. Published with help and encouragement from Camil Petrescu, it was favorably reviewed by Eugen Lovinescu but received a decidedly negative note from George Călinescu. This was followed by Marea fugă (1938), Primăvara pe Târnave (vol. I-II, 1960–1963) and Lumea începe cu mine (1968). Her first play, Turneu în provincie, appeared in 1946. She would become among the most prolific Romanian playwrights of her day, with Cumpăna (1949), Vadul nou (1951), Premiera (1952), Oameni de azi (1952), Trei generații (1956) and Vlaicu și feciorii lui (1959), among others, as well as a large number of one-act works.

A leading practitioner of socialist realism, she was much appreciated by the communist regime. Her short story collections include Destine (1939), Album de familie (1945), Oglinda (1957), Nunta Ilonei (1960), Făgăduielile (1964), La ora ceaiului (1970), Întoarcerea la miracol (1974), Te iubesc, viață (1984) and Plimbare în parcul liniștit (1987); she also authored the 1971 volume of travel notes Acuarele. Authors whom she translated include William Shakespeare, Charles Perrault, Gustave Flaubert, Victor Hugo, Honoré de Balzac, Alexandre Dumas, Ivan Turgenev, Guy de Maupassant, Konstantin Stanislavski, Marcel Achard, Vitaly Bianki, Ivan Bunin, Julien Green and Louis Bromfield. She won the Femina prize in 1936 and the State Prize in 1951. In 1971, she was awarded the Order of Cultural Merit, 2nd class. Her memoirs, which she wrote intermittently between 1975 and 1991, cover over 500 pages, and appeared in 2005.
