= Dan Petrașincu =

Italian-Romanian anthropologist, writer and translator

Angelo Moretta
- Born: June 2, 1910; Odessa, Russian Empire
- Died: 1997 (aged 86–87); Rome, Italy
- Occupations: writer, anthropologist, translator
- Writing career
- Pen name: Dan Petrașincu
- Language: Romanian, Italian

Dan Petrașincu (Romanian: [ˈdan petraˈʃiŋku]; born Angelo Moretta, Italian: [ˈandʒelo moˈretta]; 2 June 1910 – 1997) was an Italian-Romanian anthropologist, writer and translator.

He was born in Odessa from an Italian father and a Romanian mother. In the aftermath of the Russian Revolution, when he was ten years old, the family fled to Romania, where he went to high school in Râmnicu Sărat and Bucharest.

He worked as a copy-editor for "Rampa”, "Adevărul”, "Reporter”, "Lumea românească”, "România literară”.

Together with Mihai Șerban and Ieronim Sârbu he published the magazine "Discobolul" (1932-1933).

He translated from Victor Hugo, Gaston Baty, Wanda Wasilewska, etc.

After 1950 he lived in Italy, and died in Rome in 1997.

== Works ==
- Sângele, Bucharest, 1935 (for which he was given the "Dimineața” newspaper's Prose Award)
- Omul gol, Bucharest, 1936 (re-written as Omul și fiara, Bucharest, 1941)
- Monstrul, București, 1937; (re-written as Copilăria cu umbre), Bucharest, 1944; Bucharest, 1994
- Miracolul, Bucharest, 1939
- Junglă, Bucharest, 1940
- Edgar Poe, iluminatul, Bucharest, 1942
- Cora și dragostea, Bucharest, 1943
- Timpuri împlinite, Bucharest, 1947
- Un mare poet al libertății: Alexandru Sergheevici Pușkin, Bucharest, 1949
- La resa dei conti, Rome, 1957
- Lo spirito dell'India, Rome, 1960 Romanian edition: Spiritul Indiei (București, 1993)
- Gli dei dell'India, Milan, 1966; I miti indiani edition, Milano, 1982; Romanian edition: Mituri indiene (Bucharest, 1998)
- Il pensiero Vedanta, Rome, 1968; Romanian edition: Gândirea Vedanta, (Bucharest, 1996)
- La parola e il silenzio, Rome, 1970; Romanian edition: Cuvântul și tăcerea. O posibilă reconstituire a Logosului cu ajutorul conceptului de Sabda-Sphoța din lingvistica indiană (Bucharest, 1994)
- Il Daimon e il superuomo, Rome, 1972; Romanian edition: Daimon și supraom (Bucharest, 1994)
- Aurobindo e il futuro dell'uomo, Rome, 1974
- Il Quinto millennio, Milan, 1979
- I miti delle antiche civilta messicane, Milan, 1984; Romanian edition: Miturile vechilor civilizații mexicane (Bucharest, 1998)
- Miti antichi e mito del progresso. Antropologia del sacro dal paleolitico al nucleare, Genoa, 1990; Romanian edition: Mituri antice și mitul progresului. Antropologia sacrului din paleolitic până în era nucleară (Bucharest, 1994)
- 7 miti maya e aztechi e delle antiche civilta messicane, Milan, 1996
