= Sburătorul =

- Revista literară, artistică și culturală
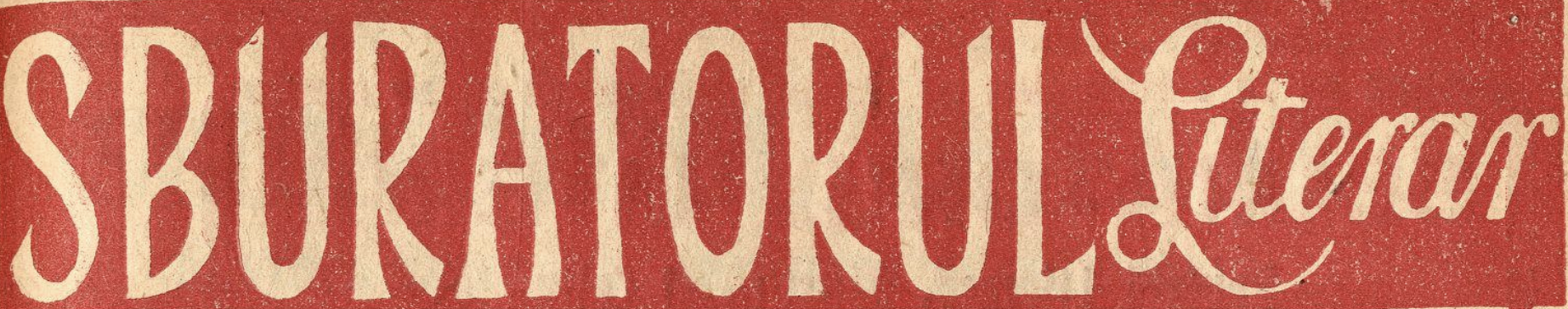
- Masthead used from 1921 to 1922
- Editor: Eugen Lovinescu
- Founded: April 1919
- Ceased publication: December 1922
- Relaunched: 1926–1927

Sburătorul was a Romanian modernist literary magazine and literary society, established in Bucharest in April 1919. Led by Eugen Lovinescu, the circle was instrumental in developing new trends and styles in Romanian literature, ranging from a new wave of Romanian symbolism to an urban-themed realism and the avant-garde. The review, subtitled Revista literară, artistică şi culturală ("Literary, artistic, and cultural review"), was published between April 1919 and May 1921, and again from March 1926 to June 1927 (a weekly magazine entitled Sburătorul Literar was published between September 1921 and December 1922).

During its last period in print, Sburătorul engaged in a polemic with partisans of a more traditional style, especially figures grouped around the Sămănătorul magazine. Lovinescu himself argued against Nicolae Iorga's ethnocentric views on Romania in the Middle Ages.

== Name ==
In Romanian mythology, Zburătorul (of which Sburătorul is an antiquated variant, used notably in the works of Ion Heliade Rădulescu) was the embodiment of lust, a beautiful but eerie young man with demonic features who visits adolescent girls in their dreams. Lovinescu explained the choice in his first editorial:

"Vague thrills, warmth and coldness, yearnings for impossible beauty, and, at once, torpor, a deep unsettling of the entire soul, bashfulness and insane certainty, an escape from the world and realities, blended with a belief in chimaera, restlessness and a thirst for rest... [These come from] the very same Zburătorul, the same pale master of youthful dreams, the same kiss of warm lips on cool foreheads, the same mystical engagement to whatever will be. [...] Those who begin issuing this magazine have received Zburătorul's kiss a long time ago. They are halfway through on the path of life. They have not, however, forgotten the thrills of yesteryear, nor taste and disgust for the world, the impossibility of fitting in and belief in impossible chimaera. They have not forsaken their idealism."

== Members and contributors ==
- Felix Aderca
- Ion Barbu
- Lucian Boz
- Gheorghe Brăescu
- Sergiu Dan
- Lucia Demetrius
- Victor Eftimiu
- Benjamin Fondane
- Anton Holban
- Ion Minulescu
- Hortensia Papadat-Bengescu
- Camil Petrescu
- Ion Pillat
- Victor Ion Popa
- Isaia Răcăciuni
- Liviu Rebreanu
- Eugen Relgis
- Henriette Yvonne Stahl
- Al. T. Stamatiad
- Nicolae Steinhardt
- Vladimir Streinu
- Francisc Șirato
- Caton Theodorian
- Tudor Vianu
- I. C. Vissarion
- Ilarie Voronca
