= Vladimir Streinu =

Romanian writer (1902–1970)

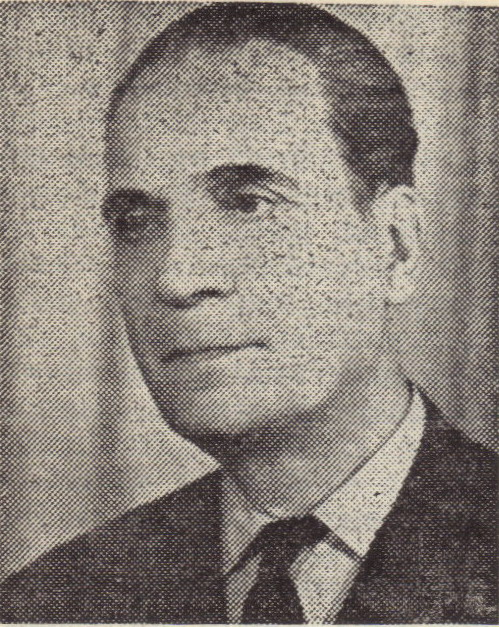
Vladimir Streinu

Nicolae Iordache (May 23, 1902 in Teiu, Argeș – November 26, 1970 in Bucharest), known by his pseudonym Vladimir Streinu, was a Romanian literary critic, poet, essayist and translator. In January 1939, Streinu joined King Carol II's National Renaissance Front, as part of a mass recruitment among Romanian Writers' Society members. In 2006, he was elected a posthumous member of the Romanian Academy.
