= Camil Baltazar =

Romanian poet

Camil Baltazar (Romanian pronunciation: [kaˈmil baltaˈzar]; pen name of Leibu Goldenstein or Leopold Goldstein; August 25, 1902 in Focșani – April 27, 1977 in Bucharest) was a Romanian-Jewish poet.

== Selected works ==
- Vecernii, 1923
- Flaute de mătase, 1923
- Reculegeri în nemurirea ta, 1925
- Biblice, 1926
- Strigări trupești lângă glesne, 1927
- Cina cea de taină, 1929
- Poeme vechi și noi, 1931
- Întoarcerea poetului la uneltele sale, 1937
- Tărâm transparent, 1939
