= Universul =

Romanian newspaper

Universul was a mass-circulation newspaper in Romania. It existed from 1884 to 1953, and was run by Stelian Popescu from 1914 to 1943 (with a two-year break during World War I).
