= Eugen Lovinescu =

Romanian literary historian, literary critic, academic and novelist (1881 - 1943)

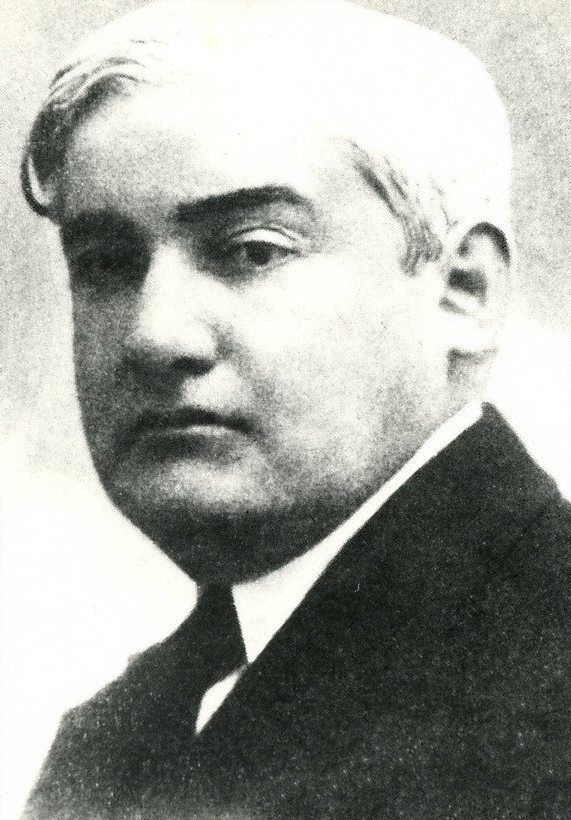
- Born: 31 October 1881; Fălticeni, Kingdom of Romania
- Died: 16 July 1943 (aged 61); Bucharest, Kingdom of Romania
- Resting place: Grădini Cemetery, Fălticeni, Romania
- Education: University of Bucharest
- Occupations: literary historian; literary critic; academic; novelist
- Spouse: Ecaterina Bălăcioiu-Lovinescu
- Children: Monica Lovinescu
- Relatives: Anton Holban
- Writing career
- Literary movement: Modernism

Eugen Lovinescu (Romanian: [e.uˈdʒen loviˈnesku]; 31 October 1881 – 16 July 1943) was a Romanian modernist literary historian, literary critic, academic, and novelist, who in 1919 established the Sburătorul literary club. He was the father of Monica Lovinescu, and the uncle of Horia Lovinescu, Vasile Lovinescu, and Anton Holban. He was elected to the Romanian Academy posthumously, in 1991.

== Biography ==
Born in Fălticeni, he was a graduate of the Boarding High School in Iași and of the University of Bucharest's Faculty of Classical Languages, and briefly worked as a high school teacher of Latin in Ploiești. He made his literary debut in the literary supplement of Adevărul, and became permanently featured in the periodical Epoca, as the author of pieces on Sămănătorul writers (such as Mihail Sadoveanu, Ion Agârbiceanu, and Octavian Goga). At the time, Lovinescu was already taking a stand which would lead to the prolonged disputes with Nicolae Iorga and Garabet Ibrăileanu.

He obtained his doctorate in Paris for his work on Jean-Jacques Weiss, and an additional history on the accounts 19th century French travelers gave of Greece. Both were praised by Émile Faguet.

In 1936, his candidacy for acceptance into the Romanian Academy was refused. Lovinescu was posthumously elected to the Romanian Academy. He died in 1943 in Bucharest and was buried in the family crypt at the Grădini Cemetery in Fălticeni.

== Views ==
Building on the legacy of Titu Maiorescu, Lovinescu aimed to show that both the author and critic are never cut out from their social and cultural environments. He opposed Garabet Ibrăileanu's theory of selection (the compromise between individual genius and social requirement), proposing instead the idea that creation and demand occupy the very same moment in time. Lovinescu's analysis was backed by the views of Faguet, Jules Lemaître, as well as Gabriel Tarde's notion of a group mind; it also adhered to the esthetic tenets of Impressionism.

The main advocate of Modernism, Lovinescu rejected the preoccupation of Poporanism and the Sămănătorul group had with rural themes, arguing in favour of novels with an urban setting. His Sburătorul published works by a new generation of writers, realists to symbolists to early avant-garde: Camil Petrescu, Ion Barbu, Tudor Vianu, Liviu Rebreanu, Benjamin Fondane, Ilarie Voronca, Hortensia Papadat-Bengescu, and many others.

The polemic with Sămănătorul extended over decades: Lovinescu is also remembered for his rejection of Nicolae Iorga's thesis on the origin of the Romanian reignant Princes as an institution in Wallachia and Moldavia. While Iorga claimed that they had been a creation of peasant communities delegating power to their most able members, in a regional sphere that would have been virtually cut off from the rest of Europe, Lovinescu pointed out that some of the first voivodes mentioned seemed to have been perfectly familiar with feudal relations, and well-integrated in European culture (for example, he pointed out that works at Curtea de Argeș Monastery had unearthed the remains of a hospodar dressed in accordance with European fashion of the time).

== Major works ==
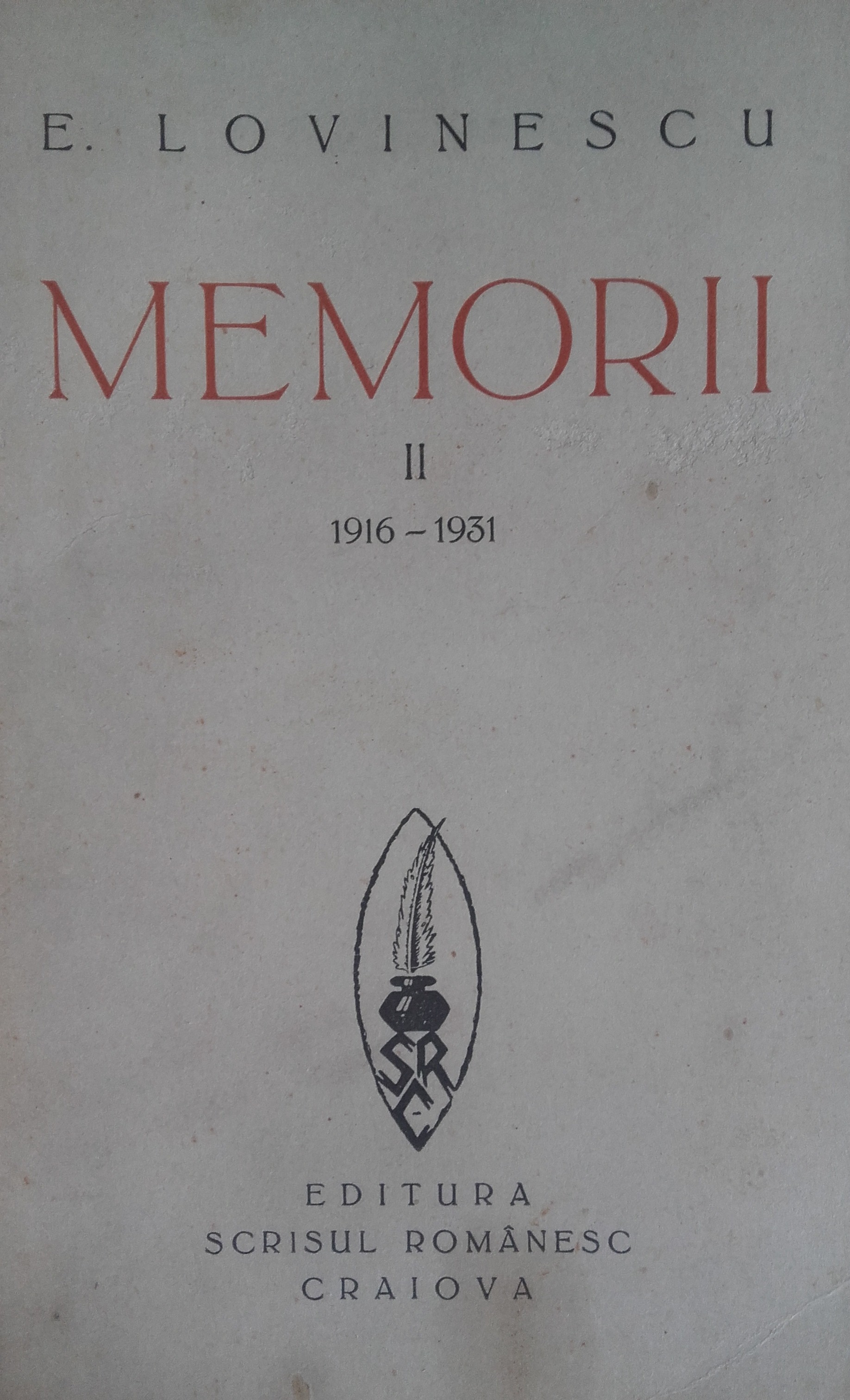
Memoirs, vol. II (1916–1931)

- The History of Modern Romanian Civilisation (I-III)
- The History of Contemporary Romanian Literature (I-IV)
- Critical Essays (10 volumes)
- Memoirs (I-III).
- T. Maiorescu (I-II),
- T. Maiorescu and His Contemporaries (I-II);
- T. Maiorescu and His Legacy in Criticism

His arguably most famous epics are the two novels about Mihai Eminescu's loves: Mite (1934) – centered on Mite Kremnitz, and Bălăuca (1935) – about Veronica Micle.

Eugen Lovinescu was a noted translator of works in Latin and Ancient Greek, as well as the author of Romanian language textbooks.

== Legacy ==
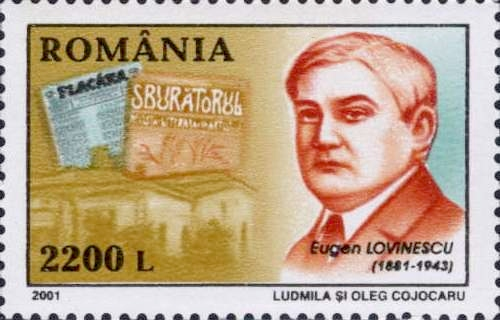
Eugen Lovinescu on a 2001 Romanian stamp

A high school in Bucharest is named after him, and so are streets in Bucharest, Cluj-Napoca, Constanța, Pitești, and Satu Mare. The building in Bucharest where he lived and where the Sburătorul literary society held is meetings from 1938 to 1943 is now called Casa Lovinescu. In 2001, Poșta Română issued a 2,200 lei stamp in his honor.
