= Isaia Răcăciuni =

Romanian writer and editor (1900–1976)

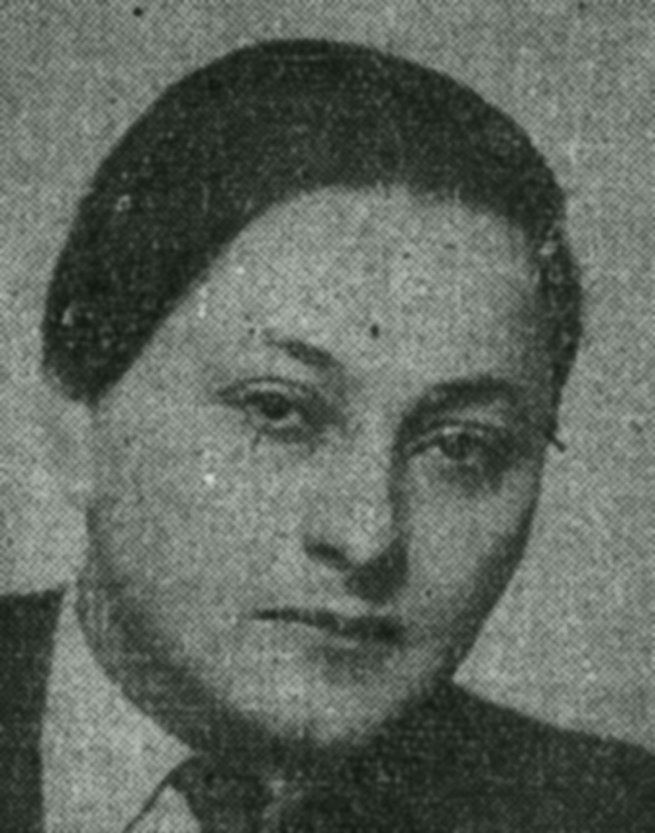
- Răcăciuni , c. 1937
- Born: Isaia Nacht; 21 September 1900; Gâșteni-Răcăciuni, Bacău County, Kingdom of Romania
- Died: 17 June 1976 (aged 75); Bucharest, Socialist Republic of Romania
- Occupations: Journalist; editor; publisher; translator; accountant; politician
- Writing career
- Period: c. 1917–1968
- Genres: Tragicomedy; verse drama; melodrama; boulevardier drama; comedy; pastiche; satire; autofiction; social novel; novella; erotic literature; reportage; screenplay; biography; memoir; closet drama; diary; children's literature
- Movements: Modernism; Expressionism; Sburătorul

Isaia or Isaiia Răcăciuni (also Răcăciun or Răcăciune, born Isaia Nacht; 21 September 1900 – 17 June 1976) was a Romanian writer and editor. A member of the local Jewish community, he always craved assimilation, a longing that informed part of his literary output. His works were also tinged by expressionism, a stylistic affiliation that began when he was an adolescent. Immediately after World War I, Răcăciuni found steady employment at various publishing houses and book-distribution centers; he began networking with some of the major figures in Romanian literature, Christian as well as Jewish, all the while consolidating his own reputation as a translator from German, English, French, and Russian. His first published work of expressionist drama, Trei cruci, was warmly received by contemporary critics, though not performed in theaters. He was employed as a critic and promoter at various newspapers, beginning with Clipa, and debuted as a screenwriter in the silent era, initially by adapting Ronetti Roman's Manasse (1925). His career in publishing took off during the 1930s, when he seconded Alexandru Rosetti—first at Editura Cultura Națională, then at the Royal Foundations.

Răcăciuni toned down his expressionism with the 1931 drama, Poste-restante, which was disliked by the public and resulted in a conflict between the author and his director, Victor Ion Popa. He experienced more success, but also sparked controversy, with the 1934 novel Mâl, depicting promiscuous youths. Months later, the rise of a far-right movement which espoused antisemitism left Răcăciuni and his actor brother, Nicolae Stroe, exposed to persecution. His plays were taken out of production; his attempt to return as a screenwriter, alongside the fascist sympathizer N. Porsenna, ended with further negative exposure of his Jewishness. Răcăciuni and Stroe both accepted full-on segregation under the "National Legionary State", when they participated in creating an all-Jewish theater, The Barașeum. The subsequent "Legionary rebellion", which also included a round-up of Jews, inspired Răcăciuni to write a work of closet drama. As Ion Antonescu inaugurated his one-man regime, maintaining and enhancing the persecution of Jews, Răcăciuni was designated as a hostage of the Romanian state. He remained somewhat active in the press, including as a pseudonymous contributor to nominally fascist newspapers; in 1943, The Barașeum hosted him with a boulevardier play that endured as his best-received.

Antonescu's ouster in August 1944 gave Răcăciuni an opportunity to return as a Romanian writer. He was initially political, favoring liberal democracy and urging for the swift return of confiscated Jewish property. He gravitated toward the Romanian Communist Party, but did not join it, and largely withdrew from public life as Romania was being turned into a communist state. Sometimes lambasted by the communist establishment for his enduring artistic independence and his failure to meet deadlines, he was only present as a translator for most of the 1950s and early 1960s. Răcăciuni secretly kept a diary, and, during the détente of the late 1960s, published selective memoirs—though these were criticized for apparently self-serving inaccuracies. His plays were only collected as a volume in 1990, some fourteen years after his death.

== Biography ==
=== Early life ===
Isaia Nacht was born on 21 September 1900 in Gâșteni-Răcăciuni, Bacău County, to the landholder Beniamin Nacht and his wife Zelda (or Eugenia) Gittner. He had a younger brother, Stroe, later noted as an actor under the pseudonym of "Nicolae Stroe". The family was entirely Jewish; Isaia substituted his place of origin for his surname as a way to underscore his assimilation into the mainstream, as well as his enduring love for the Western Moldavian countryside. Beniamin's economic and social status was highly controversial: the Romanian Kingdom's native upper class delegated its estates to be managed by landholders, widely perceived by the peasants as ruthless, foreign exploiters. This situation was acknowledged by Răcăciuni in his 1937 social novel, Paradis uitat ("Forsaken Paradise"), which depicts a Jewish family escaping its ghetto-like isolation and finding symbiosis with the natural landscape, only to be chased out from their rented land by the peasant uprising of 1907.

The family had indeed left Bacău County in 1907, and had settled in Bucharest, the kingdom's capital city. Isaia was enlisted for a while at Schewitz-Thieren boarding school. In 1909, he was studying at an Evangelical chapel school—where his teachers included the novelist Ioan Slavici. In 1917, as most of Romania was under German occupation, he was already engaged in writing plays, with stylistic references to theatrical and cinematic expressionism. Literary historian Ovid S. Crohmălniceanu suggests that his debut tragicomedy, Mirele ("The Groom"), was entirely based on similar works by Carl Sternheim, and as such one of Romania's firsts in localized expressionism. In postwar Greater Romania, Nacht also became passionate about translation, and began rendering into Romanian various works by Maxim Gorky, Reiner Maria Rilke, and Paul Verlaine, also debuting in 1920 at Dacia newspaper (for which he used the pen name "Ion Negrea"). Here, he published his version of Heinrich Heine's Atta Troll, following up with undated versions of biographies by John Drinkwater (Cromwell) and Lytton Strachey (Queen Victoria).

Young Nacht's first employment was as a literary reviewer. By his own account, he personally handled manuscripts by Slavici and Tudor Arghezi, both of whom had been imprisoned for having favored the German occupiers over the returning loyalists. He held a job at Gutenberg publishing house (1920–1921), after which he completed his mandatory training in the Romanian Land Forces; he may have then attended the Commercial Academy, but this remains unattested. He returned to letters as a dramatist, an "apocalyptic" play, Trei cruci ("Three Crosses"), which can be dated to 1922 but was only released in 1924. This was also a return to the avant-garde: of all his contributions, Trei cruci is "the closest to expressionism", exploring themes of "erotic frenzy" and "denial of civilization", alongside a dose of "Nietzschean ideas". The prose encloses a poem, done by Răcăciuni himself as a pastiche of Georg Heym, and has a climax that is heavily reliant on mystery plays. On its publication, the overall text won some contextual praise from Alexandru Bilciurescu:

The aesthetes, overfed on Bataille's sentimental sauces, will discover this 'play' as 'something new', and the modern spectators, who can no longer be trusted to reasonably follow a philosophical play, [...] will be much interested by these 9 tableaux. The naturalization of modern theater has not yet taken place in our country, for all the laudable efforts of directors such as Soare Z. Soare and Gusty, and of writers such as Mr Ioan Sân Giorgiu. The true naturalization is now being carried out by Mr Răcăciuni [...].

Nacht was simultaneously an accountant for the national book distribution service, Centrala Cărții, where his boss was the philosopher Nae Ionescu, who is sometimes credited as his discoverer. At Centrala, he became personally acquainted with authors such as Perpessicius, who treasured his "youthful enthusiasm", and Emanoil Bucuța. From 1924, Clipa newspaper had Nacht as a theatrical columnist; his growing notoriety allowed him to join a literary club formed by Mihail Dragomirescu, whose other members were enlisted at the University of Bucharest. In parallel, Nacht's brother Stroe, who had managed to fend off antisemitic prejudice in graduating from the Bucharest Conservatory for Dramatic Arts, began his career with various troupes. While at Teatrul Mic, he was colleagues with Nora Piacentini, who became his wife (and Răcăciuni's sister-in-law) in 1926.

At Clipa, Isaia joined with Constantin Tavernier in composing another expressionist play, Carnaval ("Carnival"), issued by that paper in 1925. Also then, he and Scarlat Froda co-wrote the screenplay to a silent film, Manasse, which had Jean Mihail as director; based on a fin de siècle play by Ronetti Roman, it explored the conflicts engendered by Jewish segregation and assimilation, and was much disliked by Romanian nationalists. Răcăciuni's twin plays Mirele and Uzina ("The Factory") were first performed by the people's theater of Tismana, in 1927; the same year, he and N. N. Șerbănescu contributed a screenplay for a silent film about Iancu Jianu. Șerbănescu also reserved the option to film Trei cruci, claiming that he was working on this project by July 1927.

=== Interwar successes ===
Răcăciuni had a tentative political career in the youth section of the National Peasants' Party, which he joined in June 1928, at roughly the same time as fellow dramatist Tudor Mușatescu. From 1928 to 1929, he was a film and theater critic at Premiera weekly, introducing the Romanian public to expressionistic, and more generally modernist, theater and cinema. His articles familiarized the Romanian public with Sternheim, Georg Kaiser, Konstantin Stanislavski, August Strindberg, Hermann Sudermann, and Frank Wedekind. He regarded Kaiser with particular respect, rating him as always superior to Luigi Pirandello. In one of its issues for 1928, the magazine also featured his own short play, Poveste la anticar ("An Antiquarian's Story"). In 1929, as Horia Igiroșanu had completed filming on Iancu Jianu (released to mixed reviews), Răcăciuni printed portions of another, more complex, play, Histerie ("Hysteria"). It is seen by Crohmălniceanu as significantly better than Trei cruci, for having "an authentically expressionist protagonist" in Lora, "the female answer to Don Juan". He never sought to publish the complete version, for fear that his idea would be plagiarized. During 1930, Arghezi's Bilete de Papagal had him as its theater columnist. Usually pseudonymous (as "Ion Negrea", "Ion Noapte", "I. Nopteanu", or "Vladimir Spătaru"), he made regular contributions in newspapers such as Adevărul, Azi, and Ecoul, as well as in the magazines Rampa and Revista Fundațiilor Regale. Alongside his brother and a third author, Nicolae Vlădoianu, he made occasional use of the signature "Ric-Rac".

According to notes kept by cartoonist Neagu Rădulescu, Nacht-Răcăciuni refined his craft as an attendee of a Bucharest modernist club, Sburătorul. From 1929, he was secretary of another publishing venture, Editura Cultura Națională (ECN), which was at the time managed by linguist Alexandru Rosetti. Perpessicius, who reunited with him as a panelist judge for the ECN's yearly awards, recalls that he became Rosetti's "assistant, as dedicated as he was luminous". Sebastian, who interacted directly with Răcăciuni in this capacity, was less impressed: in of his letters of 1930, he calls Răcăciuni "that minuscule buffoon" (caraghiosul ăla mărunt). From 1933, Rosetti found Răcăciuni similar employment at the Royal Foundations—this allowed him to participate in putting out definitive editions from authors such as George Bacovia, Ion Barbu, George Călinescu, and Camil Petrescu, and also saw him fighting to have I. Peltz granted his own standalone volume. He was present for a visit made by King Carol II, who disturbed Gala Galaction as the latter was translating from the Bible.

Răcăciuni claimed that, in or around 1930, Liviu Rebreanu had tried to get Trei cruci produced by the National Theater Bucharest. In February 1930, Maria Ventura commissioned him as a translator for her newly formed troupe, using his version of Ladislas Fodor's Church Mouse. In 1931, his Poste-restante (named after the mail delivery system) was taken up by the same Ventura, with Victor Ion Popa as director and Aura Buzescu as the female lead. It endures as his tamest and most realistic play, with only the faintest expressionistic echoes, and regarded by critic I. Valerian as largely within the theatrical canon established by Henri Bernstein; it was once acknowledged by the author as having been a faithful rendering of actual events. In Crohmălniceanu's summary, it is the life story of "a femme fatale, bent on self-destruction through a sad erotic frenzy of obscure biological origins." According to literary critic Mircea Anghelescu, Poste-restante is an inconsequential, artificial play, since the writer could never decide what message he needed to transmit, ultimately treating his characters as "toys of fate". Anghelescu reports that Popa added his own contribution to the play's failure: his vision was inordinately "static". The author and his director clashed over this issue, resulting in Răcăciuni being banned from attending the rehearsals.

J. Mihail again hired Răcăciuni, alongside George Mihail Zamfirescu, as writers for Aur ("Gold"), adapted from a story by Constanța Hodoș; though filming is known to have taken place in Sighișoara in the second half of 1931, it remains unclear whether Aur was actually ever completed. Răcăciuni alone drafted, but did not publish, a "dramatic legend" eponymously titled after Jesus (Isus)—the manuscript was reportedly dated to 1932, but includes details on events happening later, in Nazi Germany. Its prologue shows a fictional rabbi, Iehuda ben Halevy, as he engages in disputations with a Catholic bishop, animated by their shared destiny as would-be victims of Nazi terror; other portions of the text dwell on the life of Jesus, and, Anghelescu notes, are entirely outside expressionism. He had also completed another tragicomedy, called Bosfor ("Bosporus"). It was scheduled for production at a Bucharest theater in June 1932, but was pulled out of the program after the company suggested alterations to the text.

In March 1934, Răcăciuni had finished a comedy, Doctorul Berechet ("Doctor Plenty"), that was supposed to be staged by Ion Iancovescu's troupe. His debut novel, Mâl ("Ooze"), appeared later in 1934. It stands as both an autofictional text and a document of sexual dis-inhibition, to the point of free love, by Bucharest's Westernized youths. The female protagonist, Iris, is based on novelist Henriette Yvonne Stahl, whom he himself had introduced at Sburătorul. Critics of the day were almost universally welcoming of Mâl, with Sburătorul's own Eugen Lovinescu as a noted exception; Șerban Cioculescu also objected to the narrative being "too saturated with useless stuff", but overall a "good start", at its best reminiscent of Jean Richepin's Le Glu. More informal debates about the novel's qualities were carried out in coffeehouses. After attending one of these, Alexandru Cazaban composed one of his epigrams:

Mâl nu are epigramă
Și romanul e de soi.
Eu i-aș face una bună
Dar mă umplu de noroi.

Translation:

Nobody wrote in verse of Ooze
Though the book is not a dud.
Bet you I could be of use,
Lest you cover me in mud.

=== During fascism ===
In the 1930s, Răcăciuni had influence in cultural affairs, enough that he could persuade Bucharest Radio to offer near-permanent employment to a comedy duo, "Stroe and Vasilache", comprising his brother and an actor friend, Vasile Vasilache. He also helped along by penning (but not signing) a "Stroe and Vasilache" book for children, which appeared with illustrations by Marcela and Florica Cordescu. Răcăciuni's Jewishness became a major topic of contention later in the interwar, as Romania experienced a steady growth of the antisemitic far-right. During late 1934, the Crusade of Romanianism denounced Jewish authors, including Răcăciuni and Camil Baltazar, for taking up Romanian public funds, at the detriment of native authors. Another one of Răcăciuni's plays, Bursa neagră ("Black Market"), a revamped version of Doctorul Berechet that used its secondary title, was produced by Zamfirescu at the National Theater Iași in 1935, but only briefly—it was cancelled immediately after local antisemites had inquired about the author's ethnicity, threatening violence. Published in the wake of such rejection, and largely drafted on-location in Slănic-Moldova, Paradisul uitat doubled as commentary on assimilation. Its rural setting and deep nostalgia were remarked on by Lovinescu, who describes it as a paradoxical work of "Jewish Sămănătorism". It was praised by a Jewish author, Alexandru Robot, for its authenticity, but also for its innovative traits—as the first work to depict Jewish energies directed toward village life. Such verdicts were contrasted by a later critic, Nicolae Manolescu, who opined that Răcăciuni's perspective on the "Jewish Question" was at least partly preceded by Roman's Manasse. Manolescu also describes Răcăciuni's own text as "worthless, baroque and pompous."

Under antisemitic pressures, the ECN also reduced its output of Romanian Jewish literature. As reported in March 1934 by Emil Dorian, Rosetti would not grant the funds for such publications, while Răcăciuni, a "good guy [and] fellow Semite", was "powerless" when it came to the editorial line. In early 1935, Răcăciuni was in France, reportedly as a guest of Théâtre de l'Athénée and Louis Jouvet, who considered staging one of his plays. Upon returning to the Foundations, he maintained his literary prestige, and had "some ten youths" following him around to obtain favors from him; he was reportedly considering giving up on his career, dreaming of becoming "a sailor or a lemon-stand owner in Marseille." He was however also said to be working on his own "vast social novel", called Viața ultimilor boieri ("Lives of the Last Boyars"). In mid-1936, he was editor of Luz magazine, published in Romanian, Spanish and Portuguese for a local and South American audience. It also hosted his presentation of King Carol.

More attacks followed, some of them directed by the Iconar group, which was in close proximity to the fascist Iron Guard. Its leader, Mircea Streinul, personally handled the issue by identifying Răcăciuni as an anti-Romanian, and by referring to him with several puns—such as Isaia Cuperciuni (from cu perciuni, "with payot"); this practice was in turn ridiculed by a moderate nationalist, Traian Chelariu, who argued that Iconar was only undermining its own respectability. Around that time, Răcăciuni had completed a novella and "mordant piece of satire", called Dați-ni'L înapoi pe Iisus ("Give Us Back Our Jesus"). It centers on the inner conflict of a Jew, Jair Stuparu, driven to suicide by his unrequited love of Romania and his failure to uphold Zionism. The title was a direct response to Iron Guard and its reading of Orthodox dogmas, by invoking the Jewish origins of Christianity. By then, he and Baltazar had also translated Heinrich Mann's Jagd nach Liebe; in 1937, Răcăciuni alone published version of The Captain's Daughter, originally by Alexander Pushkin, and Carmen, by Prosper Mérimée. Edmund Fleg's biography of Moses, in his translation, was published in late 1937.

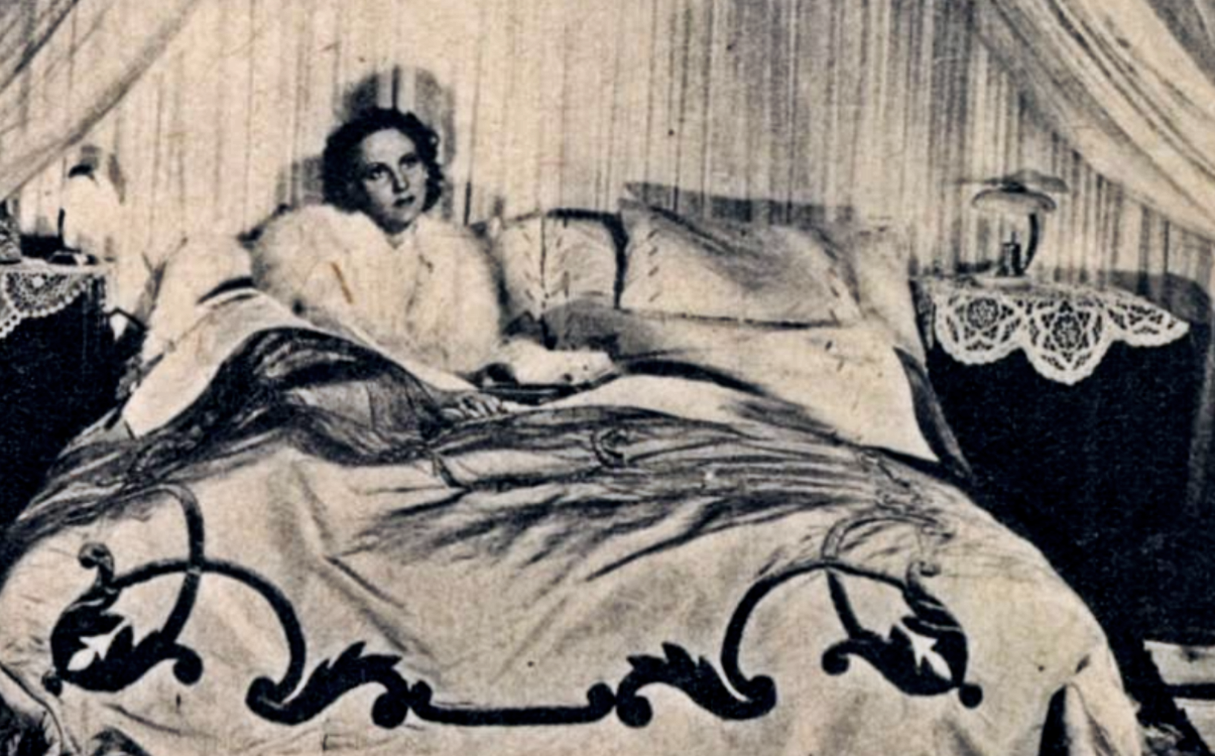
Shooting of a bedroom scene from Se-aprind făcliile, July 1939

Antisemitic radicalization was tolerated under the National Renaissance Front (FRN), established by Carol, in 1938, as Romania's sole legal party. In that context, Colonel N. Cristescu included "Răcăciuni-Nacht" on a list of Jews who, while "blindly serving their own nationalism" (Cristescu's emphasis), attacked Romanian nationalism "with the most brazen perseverance". State censorship intervened to ban Dați-ni'L înapoi pe Iisus from even being printed. Răcăciuni was still involved on the 1939 film project Se-aprind făcliile, co-writing its screenplay with N. Porsenna by adapting one of Porsenna's own novellas; Ion Șahighian was called in to direct. The resulting melodrama, now a lost film, caused significant controversy on its original release. Though Porsenna was himself an alumnus of the Ideea Liberă group within the Iron Guard, the Guard itself disliked the film. Its newspaper Porunca Vremii described the plot as "offensive", and (without mentioning Porsenna as the ultimate author) again exposed Răcăciuni as a Jew. In a July 1940 article for Universul Literar, Ladmiss Andreescu alleged that Răcăciuni, "an opaque and illegible Jewish writer", had behaved as a "dictator" during his time at the ECN, effectively controlling what books Romanians could access. In August, antisemitic regulations introduced by the regime left N. Stroe without formal employment—though he still enjoyed protection from the dissident manager Constantin Tănase, who provided "Stroe and Vasilache" with a semi-clandestine venue for their comedy.

Weeks after, the FRN regime crumbled and Ion Antonescu took over as Conducător, initially alongside the Iron Guard—which proclaimed a "National Legionary State", aligned with the Axis powers. Under this regime, Jewish segregation became mandatory and complete, forcing Jewish professionals to request the creation of a Jewish-only theater, The Barașeum. Răcăciuni filed for the permit, on 30 September 1940, and received it, to his own name, on 18 October. The project also involved N. Stroe, who was also a "constant presence" in subsequent productions. The theater only opened on 17 January 1941, just days before the Iron Guard and its military overseers clashed with each other in the "Legionary rebellion". The losing Guardists also engaged in a pogrom against Bucharest's Jews; Răcăciuni survived the event, and wrote about it in an unpublished verse drama, Noaptea sângelui ("Night of Blood"). For effect, it conflates the rebellion and the 1940 Vrancea earthquake as one single event. Its central character, the Jew Adam, has befriended the Guardist commandant Vraciu, but this connection fails to save his girlfriend, Eva, who commits suicide rather than be raped by another Guardist, Kiropol. Adam is offered a chance to save himself, but opts to face death alongside other Jews; his fellow prisoners are incensed by his self-sacrifice, believing him to be a Christian missionary, and prepare to have him lynched ahead of their own death.

Later in 1941, Răcăciuni was officially registered as one of the Jewish hostages taken by the Antonescu regime—namely, those threatened with direct repercussion in case of a Jewish revolt. As later revealed by his colleague Sergiu Dan, Răcăciuni belonged to a category of Jewish journalists who continued to write unsigned pieces in various periodicals, some of which supported the Nazi agenda. Other such authors were Baltazar, A. A. Luca, Ștefan Tita, and Dan himself. The ghetto newspaper, Gazeta Evreească, hosted Răcăciuni's theatrical chronicles from at least January 1943. In November, he was a guest speaker at Fraterna Jewish Temple, for a ceremony commemorating the writer-activist Moses Schwartzfeld—appearing there alongside Enric Furtună, Barbu Lăzăreanu, Ioan Massoff, and Lazăr Șaraga. His text, Omul de departe ("A Man Far Away"), premiered in May 1943 at The Barașeum—Dan received partial credit for having provided the original idea for the text, while the music score was authored by Eugen José Singer. Literary historian Nicolae Bârna notes it as a marginally expressionistic text, one more obviously rooted in the staples of boulevardier theater; he also believes it to be Răcăciuni's best work for the stage.

=== Under communism ===
Răcăciuni was allowed to return to regular literary life after the anti-fascist coup of 23 August 1944. Immediately after, he was appearing at Athénée Palace restaurant, an impromptu literary café, sharing his booth there with Ion Vinea, Franz Johannes Bulhardt, and Anastase Demian. In November, while living at 21 Eminescu Street, he was planning to set up his own cultural magazine, Intermezzo—with Galaction, Tita, Ștefan Baciu, Dan Petrașincu, Ieronim Șerbu, Iosif Iser and Victor Eftimiu as designated contributors. Obtaining vetting from the Social Democratic Party, he also sought approval from the Allied Commission, only for his application to be denied by the Soviet agent, S. A. Dangulov. Also then, Răcăciuni penned an article for the Jewish paper Neamul Evreesc, calling out Romanian authorities for procrastinating when it came to returning confiscated or looted assets, and describing the whole situation as a "grotesque nightmare". He managed to put out Dați-ni'L înapoi pe Iisus in its printed version in December 1944. It was followed shortly after by a reprint of his Atta Troll translation. The local press welcomed the latter contribution as a cautionary tale about the perils of German nationalism, though, according to Perpessicius, the version was unequal, alternating "perfect lines" with imperfections of an "ursine grace".

Between 1945 and 1948, Răcăciuni was department head at another publishing house, Editura Cugetarea. In 1946, he translated Dezső Szomory's Dr Alice Brönte, which was used for a production at Teatrul Mic, with Marin Iorda as director; a freak fire destroyed all the props while the company was touring with the play. In May 1946, Răcăciuni and Tita were admitted into the revamped Romanian Writers' Society, as part of a mass induction. By then, he had joined his former ECN bosses Aristide Blank and Rosetti, as well as writers Galaction, Vinea, Petre Ghiață, Valentin Saxone and Tudor Teodorescu-Braniște, in setting up the democratic-liberal club Ideea. It was ultimately banned in 1947, as incompatible with a planned takeover by the Romanian Communist Party. In the new political climate, Răcăciuni was veering toward the political left, allowing his poems to be printed in pro-Soviet magazines, including Lazăr Beneș's Lumina. According to literary historian Henri Zalis, Răcăciuni, like fellow Jews Felix Aderca and Mihail Sebastian, was persuaded by the communists' doctrine on the creation of a "new democracy". Zalis argues that such authors had learned to mistrust capitalism, without realizing that their attitudes were helping to breed a new totalitarian order.

N. Bârna notes that Răcăciuni had fully withdrawn from literary life after the establishment of a communist regime; however, his 1976 obituary includes mention of various contributions in the reportage genre, as well as his translations from Vladimir Mayakovsky. In March 1948, alongside Sașa Pană, Alexandru Phoebus, Geo Dumitrescu and Rodica Pandele, he visited with the railway workers at Grivița, having been ordered to seek his inspiration in that landscape. Answering an invitation made by Sportul Popular daily, he visited the training center of Cluj in September, promising to write "a cycle of sport-themed poems and a few novellas." Răcăciuni was still active within the Writers' Union (USR), and, in March 1949, attended a meeting with the local section of Cluj. His hosts found his presence a disappointment and an insult, since they had expected a more prestigious guest, namely George Călinescu. As a Cluj representative, Emil Isac hid his displeasure, but, behind Răcăciuni's back, referred to him under an obscene nickname, Căcăciuni. Răcăciuni was working on translating Bernhard Kellermann's Totentanz, appearing in 1950. At the USR in June of that year, he and Marcel Marcian issued objections against dramatist Mihail Davidoglu's Cetatea de foc, which they regarded as a worker-themed melodrama. They therefore challenged the literary establishment, which had awarded Davidoglu accolades for his contributions to socialist realism. As a result, they found themselves censured in Flacăra magazine, which referred to their "bourgeois opinions". In 1951, the Cinematography Committee handed him and Baltazar 280,000 lei as an advance payment on a screenplay, but they had still not completed it by 1952.

Răcăciuni is known to have suppressed mention of Isus, possibly because of its religious content, since it would have been unpalatable to the new political censors. He was instead still engaged in propagating radical-themed literature: alongside H. Dumitru, he worked on Luise Dornemann's biography of Jenny Marx, publishing their version in 1957. With Ion Filotti Cantacuzino, he penned a translation of Bertold Brecht's Threepenny Opera. It was used in 1964 by director Liviu Ciulei, albeit in a heavily modified form—interposing additional text by Ciulei and Nina Cassian. He also worked on Anna Seghers' The Dead Stay Young, done in collaboration with "Petru Mureșanu" (pen name of the interwar critic and diplomat Ion Chinezu) and published in 1964. Răcăciuni continued to write on his massive diary, finally publishing a book of memoirs (Amintiri, 1967). As noted by Anghelescu, it was part of a "boom" in memoirs by interwar survivors, in turn facilitated by a 1960s "political détente". Perspessicius welcomed it as a "book of friendship", precious in its restorative efforts, while later scholarship invoked it as a source on the social makeup of shtetls. It still sparked immediate controversy with its boasts, intensely mocked by literary critic Marian Popa in a 1971 essay. Răcăciuni's claims about Camil Petrescu were seen as especially egregious, since the memoirist reported that he had both inspired and corrected Petrescu's magnum opus, Ultima noapte de dragoste, întâia noapte de război. Researcher Doru Scărlătescu, who found the account "revolting" (especially since Răcăciuni added that he had needed to condense the novel), also noted that it contradicted known facts of literary history. A similar point was made by the former theatre critic G. Cristobald, in relation to Răcăciuni's claim to have partied with George Mihail Zamfirescu at a time when Zamfirescu's whereabouts could be precisely verified to another location.

Răcăciuni lived for almost a decade after this scandal. In April 1968, he was in Bacău, lecturing at the pedagogic institute about his erstwhile encounters with poet George Bacovia. He returned to his native village in August of that year, addressing a large crowd of locals, numbering as many as 300, in the house of culture. He presented them with his new project, that of translating diaries left by medics in the Imperial German Army, who had set up camp in the area during the Third Battle of Oituz (1917). After an unspecified debilitating illness, he died in Bucharest on the morning of 17 June 1976, by which time he was being rediscovered by Crohmălniceanu as a major voice in Romanian expressionism. He was buried at Filantropia Israelite Cemetery on 20 June, after a two-day wake.

== Legacy ==
At that time of Răcăciuni's death, Trei cruci was the only one of his plays to have been published in a bound-book form—Histerie was almost entirely lost, surviving only in a German translation by Dusza Czara. N. Stroe, who had experienced success in the postwar revue genre, emigrated to Israel in 1977, and died there in June 1990. From his second marriage, to actress Rolanda Camin, he had a son, Eugen Stroe, and a daughter, Dana. The former, legally known as Eugen Nacht, became an actor and director while still in Romania. After joining his father, he opened his own studio in Shoham and made return trips to Romania, including to Răcăciuni; together with Crohmălniceanu, he undertook efforts to promote his uncle's memory. His sister, meanwhile, remained active as a clinical psychologist, in Israel.

Around 1987, Răcăciuni's plays were being collected as a single volume, Teatru, care of Elena Zaharia-Filipaș and Editura Dacia. It was planned as part of a "Restitutions" collection, but censors interfered by banning the entire project. The anthology was ultimately approved and prepared for print just shortly before the Romanian Revolution of 1989, meaning that it could only include selections from the controversial Isus. Anghelescu reported on this as a defect, since that text "is the only one that would still arouse any interest in works of drama by the now-forgotten Răcăciuni." Writer Vlaicu Bârna welcomed the posthumous volume, which was released in 1990, commenting that Răcăciuni had documented "the modern soul" with its "congenital obsessions", that the "lively dialogue" was enjoyable, upsetting "futile boulevardier plays" that were always on show in interwar Bucharest; he also observed that the republished plays still erred in their "bizarre situations and grandiloquent lines". Literary interest in Răcăciuni's biography was revived by Mansdorf, a 2023 show at the State Jewish Theater (formerly The Barașeum). It features him as a side character, and, in what may be a piece of metafiction, also as the co-author of a banned, Holocaust-themed, play.

== Sources ==
- Nicolae Bârna, "Răcăciuni, Isaiia", in Dicționarul general al literaturii române. P/R, pp. 768–770. Bucharest: Museum of Romanian Literature, 2020. ISBN 978-606-555-295-1
- Israil Bercovici, O sută de ani de teatru evreiesc în România 1876—1976. Bucharest: Editura Kriterion, 1982.
- Ovid S. Crohmălniceanu, Literatura română și expresionismul. Bucharest: Editura Minerva, 1978.
- Sergiu Levin, Lyonel Scantéyé, I. Fîntînaru, "Primim la redacție", in Minimum, Vol. VII, Issues 78–79, September–October 1993, pp. 43–47.
- Lucian Nastasă‑Kovács, Enric Furtună și "Bilanțul unui insucces". Cluj-Napoca: Editura Mega, 2020. ISBN 978-606-020-247-9
