= Barbu Nemțeanu =

Romanian poet (1887–1919)

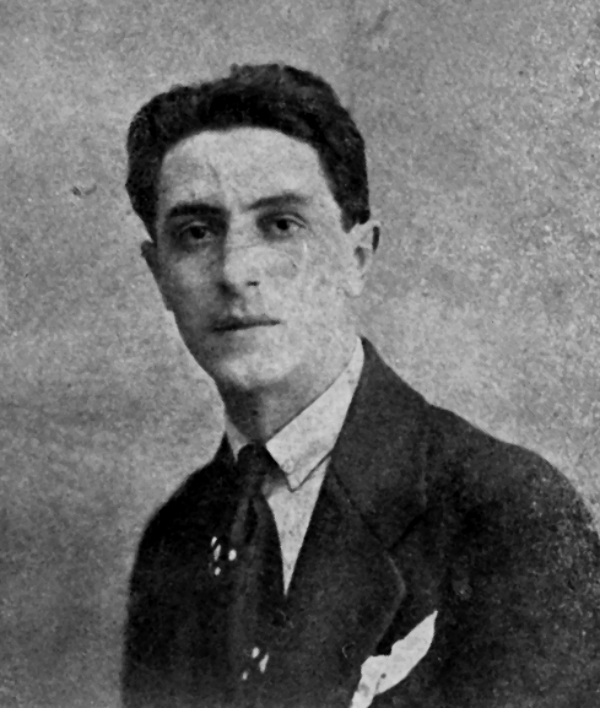
- Nemțeanu, photographed c. 1909–1915
- Born: Benjamin Deutsch; October 1, 1887; Galați or Călărași
- Died: May 30, 1919 (aged 31); Bucharest
- Resting place: Filantropia Israelite Cemetery in Bucharest
- Occupations: journalist, translator, clerk, salesman
- Writing career
- Pen name: B. Askenazi, Barbu Exoticul, Cireșeanu, Ion Corbu, Vasile Crângu, Germanicul Galitiensis, I. Tedescul, Tedesco, Luca Zimbru
- Period: 1904–1919
- Genres: lyric poetry, elegy, ode, lied, libel, free verse, short story
- Movements: Symbolism (Romanian); Convorbiri Critice; Modernism

Signature
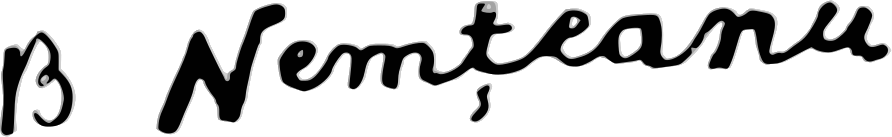

Barbu Nemțeanu (pen name of Benjamin Deutsch; October 1, 1887 – May 30, 1919) was a Romanian poet, humorist and translator, active on the modernist wing of the Romanian Symbolist movement. Of Jewish Romanian background, he lived much of his life in the port city of Galați, which provided him with poetic inspiration, but whose provincial life sparked in him intellectual revolt. Orphaned and leaving school at an early age, then diagnosed with tuberculosis, he found meager employment as a clerk, but, throughout, maintained confidence in his poetic genius. Nemțeanu's Symbolism blended with socialism, but also with a lasting admiration for his adoptive Romanian culture, allowing him to publish pseudonymous work in traditionalist-antisemitic reviews such as Neamul Românesc. He was also one of the Symbolists who frequented the Convorbiri Critice circle, becoming personal friends with its leader, Mihail Dragomirescu.

Nemțeanu was prolific as a translator of Weimar classics, German romanticists, and Yiddish literature, and then expanded his reach, learning French and contribution Romanian renditions of works by Charles Baudelaire, Tristan Klingsor, and Oscar Wilde. He continued to write despite his mounting financial problems, a bankruptcy audit, and recurrent hospitalization, even contributing a set of sanitarium-themed elegies. Sponsored by his literary friends, he survived through World War I, but died only months after the November Armistice, while recovering from surgery on his lungs. In its final stage, his Symbolism had transitioned into one of the "intimist" poems, unpretentiously versifying the rhythms of bland life, but on a progressively experimental pattern. Published by mainstream reviews such as Flacăra, they were for a while the center of a literary controversy, attacked by the classicist Duiliu Zamfirescu, and ridiculed by the more radical modernists.

== Biography ==
=== Debut years ===
Nemțeanu was born Benjamin Deutsch into a Jewish family, either in Galați or, according to other records, to the south of it, in Călărași. His parents were Iacob Deutsch, who taught at the Israelite School, and his wife Sanina, also a teacher. As reported by editor H. Fischer-Galați, who was the poet's close friend, Barbu was "small and pale", with the "unfortunate heredity of a drunkard father". Benjamin considered himself assimilated, to the point of espousing Romanian nationalism. As Fischer-Galați recounts, Nemțeanu stated that he felt jealousy toward natives and antisemites such as A. C. Cuza, because they could claim Romania as their country.

After his father died prematurely, c. 1901, Nemțeanu was the family's sole breadwinner, finding employment as an office intern. He managed to attend high school in Galați, his first published work appearing in the local weekly Înainte, in 1904, followed by contributions in the Bucharest review Dumineca. He continued to educate himself at night school although, by then, he was already showing signs of tuberculosis. An optimist, he believed that he would eventually be cured. Nemțeanu also frequented the local literary circles of Galați and Western Moldavia at large, befriending writers Avram Steuerman-Rodion and Ion Pribeagu, and later also Barbu Lăzăreanu, Eugeniu Botez and Constantin Graur. He wanted to achieve literary fame on his own, and organized a poetry festival with funds collected from the community of merchants and artisans. When one complained that the tickets were expensive, at 5 lei a piece, Nemțeanu answered back: "pay 5 now or in two years you'll be paying 20 for my statue." According to a 1921 note in Cele Trei Crișuri, "dropped into a world of misery from his adolescent years, he took all that fate threw at him with the resignation of his kind soul and with a gentle smile—that was often ironic, jaded—on his apparently serene face."

At Viața Literară, Ilarie Chendi published Deutsch's translations from Friedrich Schiller. According to literary historian Alexandru Piru, his own work was more glaringly influenced by Heinrich Heine, and as such had established a common ground with Romanian traditionalists of the Sămănătorul school. Nemțeanu sent some of his first poems to Cuza's political partner (and Sămănătorul founder) Nicolae Iorga, who reportedly enjoyed them. Some were published in Neamul Românesc, with Nemțeanu hiding under the pen name Cireșeanu, followed by samples from Goethe's elegies in Floarea Darurilor, where he used the names Ion Corbu or Vasile Crângu. By then, Nemțeanu was a reporter at the Galați-based Tribuna Liberală newspaper, then a clerk, putting out his own socialist magazine, Pagini Libere ("Free Pages"), from July 1908. The latter was noted for featuring N. D. Cocea's defense of social realism, which, according to philologist D. D. Șoitu, was modeled on an article by Vladimir Lenin. It was also a scathing rejection of the Romanian Symbolist movement as "befitting a capitalist class weakened by overindulgence".

=== In Bucharest and Switzerland ===
For a while, Nemțeanu lived in Ploiești, and relocated his magazine there. When one of his Pagini Libere poems was panned in the Convorbiri Critice magazine, Nemțeanu visited the editor Mihail Dragomirescu in Bucharest. They soon became friends, with Dragomirescu impressed, as he put it, by Nemțeanu's "elegance" and "nobility"; Nemțeanu became a regular of the affiliate circle, taking notes on how to improve his language and expand his range. Moving to Bucharest in 1910, Nemțeanu had a stint at Adevărul, where he mainly contributed to the humor supplement (using the pen names Barbu Exoticul and Germanicul Galitiensis). Now embraced by the Symbolist movement, his poetry, signed Luca Zimbru, also saw print in Vieața Nouă. His translations, original verses, prose, articles and reviews were also hosted in, among others, Flacăra, Rampa, Noua Revistă Română, Dimineața, Belgia Orientului, Floare Albastră, and in the socialist venues România Muncitoare, Facla, Viața Socială, and Viitorul Social. His pseudonyms also included B. Askenazi, I. Tedescul, and Tedesco.

Nemțeanu's first standalone book was Poezii alese ("Selected Poetry", 1910). This included his versions of seven Roman Elegies, as well as samples from Schiller, Heine, Nikolaus Lenau, and Gotthold Ephraim Lessing. It was followed by O călătorie în lumea albinelor ("A Journey into the Land of the Bees", 1911) and Stropi de soare ("Sun-drops", 1915). As noted by critic Irina Petraș, these placed him among the "troubadour and humorist" authors, illustrating a sentimental-ironic lyric verse. Nemțeanu, she notes, bridged Symbolism with modernism. Nemțeanu's inspiration from children's folklore was seen as distasteful by several reviewers from the Poporanist school: Mihail Sevastos called such pieces "weak verse about the wee ones", while Garabet Ibrăileanu was persuaded by them that children's topics "should never serve as artistic material". By contrast, Stropi de soare was much appreciated by the proletarian poet Cristian Sârbu and by the future avant-garde novelist Ion Călugăru (known for a while as "Barbu Călin", as a partial tribute to Nemțeanu).

These poetry works were complemented by a volume of prose, undated, called Povestea unei idile ("History of an Idyll"), and by undated translations from Max Bernstein (Der goldene Schlüssel) and Paul Heyse. In 1911, under contract with Biblioteca pentru toți, Nemțeanu produced a version of Hans Christian Andersen's Garden of Paradise. Also that year, Editura Lumen company issued a book comprising two of his translations from Leo Tolstoy: After the Ball and My Dream. At some point in this period, Nemțeanu also went into business as a clothing retailer, but ended up overspending. Sued by his creditors, Fischer-Galați claims that he was only spared bankruptcy by a sympathetic judge, who enjoyed his poetry. By then, Nemțeanu's disease was interfering with his lifestyle, causing him to write in the supine position, on couches, as the only way in which he could prevent exhaustion. His friends and readers pooled their money and sent him to a sanitarium in Lausanne, where he arrived in November 1913. For a couple of months afterward, he wrote at home to his female friend, Emilia Weissbluth, keeping her informed of his health. This correspondence ended abruptly, possibly because her parents rejected his marriage proposal.

In Lausanne, Nemțeanu learned French and began writing poetry in that language, producing scattered or undated translations from Tristan Klingsor and Oscar Wilde. His poetry took a more experimental and markedly modernist turn ca. 1915, when he published free verse with unusual imagery, becoming relatively famous for his metaphor of "chocolate cows". The work, often taken up in the mainstream review Flacăra, infuriated classicist poet Duiliu Zamfirescu, who used it as his focal point for a critique of modernist tendencies. Modernist colleagues, however, were also unsure about Nemțeanu—perplexed by his mundane "bourgeois" subjects, rather than his poetic formats. The radical Symbolists at Chemarea parodied his railway themed poetry: the "victorious" lyrical ego visits the hopper toilet, reflects on whether defecation makes him lose weight, and (as a political statement) wipes himself on the Bukarester Tagblatt. According to literary historian Paul Cernat, this inversion of Nemțeanu's themes is "the first scatological 'poem' in modern Romanian literature".

=== Wartime and death ===
In February 1915, Brăila's Voltaire Circle held a benefit in favor of "poet B. Nemțeanu, whose illness forces him to live abroad." Nemțeanu's stay in Lausanne ended with Romania's entry into World War I, when his colleagues were no longer able to support him. He was forced to move closer to home, in the sanitariums of Bușteni, then Moinești. This period coincided with the battles on the Romanian front, during which Bucharest fell to the Germans. During the interval in which Romania sued for peace, and before the defeat of Germany, he collaborated with the literary newspaper Scena, put out in Bucharest by A. de Herz. He continued to work on his poetic corpus, which he intended to publish as one volume, called În ritmul vieții ("To the Rhythm of Life").

Eventually, Nemțeanu checked into the Phthisiology Institute on Șoseaua Viilor, Bucharest, where he was operated upon by Ștefan Irimescu, who hoped to stabilize his condition. He died on his hospital bed while recovering from surgery, from a severe pulmonary hemorrhage. He was buried at Filantropia cemetery under a marble column, with no inscription; before 1925, the industrialist and Zionist writer A. L. Zissu, who had been Nemțeanu's close friend, paid for a small monument to be erected there. As noted by Fischer-Galați in April 1934, an unknown was still leaving fresh flowers on the grave. One of his late writings takes the form of a poetic testament, leaving behind to his unnamed child, conceived in a moment of "madness", no fortune other than his élan vital, and asking for forgiveness. In fact, he was married to a Tony Bănescu, who organized charities in his name and, responding to his explicit request, refused to accept money from the state.

Nemțeanu left numerous translations of Heine, many published in the Jewish community's Lumea Evree, appearing as Melodii ebraice in 1919. These Judaic-themed lieder were a sample of Nemțeanu's other such work—he was also a noted translator of Yiddish poetry by Eliezer Steinbarg and Iacob Ashel Groper. His work in the field was noted by poet Benjamin Fondane, who discussed Jewish contributions to Romanian culture in a 1923 piece for the modernist Contimporanul—Fondane called Nemțeanu "Heine's most precise translator into Romanian." His manuscripts, including his "Sanitarium Elegies", were collected and preserved by Lăzăreanu, who also published a biographical notice in Adevărul Literar și Artistic, May 1925. That issue also included a lyrical prose piece by I. Peltz, reflecting on Nemțeanu's illness and death.

== Work ==
Beyond its rejection by Zamfirescu, Nemțeanu's work was also given poor ratings by other critics of the period. Already in 1927, Eugen Lovinescu included him among the "troubadours" whose poetic matter was "perishable", "unacceptable in this day." Lovinescu finds that only the "chocolate-cow" lyrics showed an ability to meet modernist standards, but that they came too late in Nemțeanu's life. The same was noted by Felix Aderca, Lovinescu's colleague, who divided Nemțeanu's work into alive and dead "elements", noting that the classicist Dragomirescu had given undue weight to the latter. At his worst, Aderca notes, Nemțeanu had embodied "the mediocrity of his age", "whatever was inevitable in the poetry of Carol Scrob". His Goethe translations were panned by the Germanist Ion Gherghel, who noted that they sacrificed meter and added imagery to the original text: "One can tell that Benjamin Deutsch, disguised as Barbu Nemțeanu, is in over his head, his meager powers of no use here".

However, Nemțeanu has also gathered favorable notice, in particular for his "poems in pencil, capturing the pathos of everyday life and of the tiny bourgeois provinces". In 1919, publicist Constantin V. Gerota confessed: "I had rarely seen such sincerity and so little gravitas, such little affectation [as in Nemțeanu's poems]. Nemțeanu was a jester in his poetry. He did not spend hour upon hour with his hand to his temple, only to produce the same as what others have said before him." A "delicate, affable, intimate poet", he "had no great concept of life", but rather focused on "sentimental attitudes". Contrarily, Albert Honigman, the reviewer at Universul Literar, saw Nemțeanu as a Romanian Heine, who, beyond a "note of sentiment" and a "delicacy of expression", poured conscious thought into his poetry. Dragomirescu and Piru suggests the same, with the former noting that, had he lived to produce more works, Nemțeanu could have entered a "realm of the great poetry." Piru argues that Nemțeanu's small, sentimental poems are entirely based on, and worthy of, Heine. This, the scholar notes, includes his experiment in parody, such as in a poem mocking the serialized romance novel—written from the perspective of a ghost visiting his treacherous lover:

Adesea umblă prin grădină
Șoptindu-mi numele bolnavă...
De-aș apărea atunci nainte-i,
M-ar adora ca și o sclavă.
Dar eu, sărmanul n-am ce-i face.
Cum simt a zorilor aromă
În globul zărilor mă mistui,
Urmându-mi soarta de fantomă...
Iar de ridic spre ceruri glasul
Și dezlegarea-l rog să-mi dee
Rămâne mută-albastra boltă,
Sau îmi răspunde: (Va urma).

Translation:

She often walks about the garden,
Muttering, ill, to get my pardon...
If I were to appear to her just now,
She'd be my slave—to me she'd bow.
But I, alas, don't have permission.
The minute dawn emits its fragrant scent,
I come to slide and float, as any ghost—
Some power in the blue above has me ascent...
Sometimes, I shout and beg for my release—
The sky alone can grant me liberation;
But it remains unsympathetic, bleak,
At most proclaiming: "See you next week."

Described as "the only real poet of family life", and a "gentle intimist", Nemțeanu contributed fragments such as a humorous ode to Crasna–Huși railway. Included in Stropi de soare, and described as "flawless" by Honigman, it reads:

O trenișor de Crasna–Huși,
Locomotiva ta e-un samovar.
Iar tu, întreg, pari un tramcar:
O jucărie de păpuși.
Când dai semnal că pleci, zâmbim cu toții!
Când intri-n gară, pufăind, zâmbim...
Ades mă mir cum nu te fură hoții
Atât ești de infim!
[...]
Și totuși, trenișor de Crasna–Huși,
Tu nu-mi inspiri doar glume...
Tu nu ești jucărie de păpuși,
Tu oglindești o lume!
Locomotiva ta infimă
Aduce-atâția oameni pe la vetre!
Și — cum ar ispăși o crimă —
Mai trage și vagoane-ntregi cu pietre...

Translation:

O tiny train to Crasna–Huși,
The engine dragging you's a samovar
And you, not quite the trolley-car:
A mock-up car for dolls to push.
We giggle so when you belt out an all-aboard!
The way you pant in stations makes us smirk...
Why is it robbers don't just get you hauled and stored?
That would be easy work!
[...]
And yet, o tiny train to Crasna–Huși,
You aren't only jokes to me...
Not just a mock-up car for dolls to push,
But this whole realm I get to see!
That tiny engine so travailed
Is helping scores of men returning to their homes!
But like a malefactor—jailed—,
Is also pulling up an endless load of stones...

Employing the same favorite setting, other pieces were darker, and show instances of Nemțeanu visualizing his death:

Câmpii ruginite de-a dreapta, de-a stânga
Și trenul aleargă prin ploaie și vânt...
Și inima plânge și geme, nătângă
Și-mi place că trenul mă duce-n mormânt.

Translation:

To my right, to my left, the pastures are rusting
And our train plows through them, under winds and the rain...
And it's to my tomb that we're heading, I'm trusting,
And my silly heart weeps and wails at this train.

Various portions of Nemțeanu's lyric poetry reference his home city. As noted by George Călinescu, they make Galați a version of Bruges-la-Morte, "but preserve the atmosphere which slugs down all movements and the melancholy of industrial embankments". Some take the form of libel, expressing Nemțeanu's desperation with its citizens' materialistic focus. Șoitu argues that these lyrics were directly inspired by a 1906 dockers' strike, being thus aligned with the "realistic" and "progressive" side of Symbolism. According to Lovinescu, this is "rather more virile" poetry, but in a "format that cannot stand to the test." Relevant lyrics include an apocalyptic vision of this "Sodom of the poets" atoning for its sins:

Iar dacă ceru'n cei din urmă zori
De flăcări te-o cruța și de cutremur —
Gândește-te, oraș de negustori,
E fiindc'ai găzduit un bard pe vremuri.

Translation:

And if that final dawn should find some pity,
If heaven doesn't leave you razed and charred —
Make sure you understand, o, peddling city:
It is because you were once home to me, the bard.

== Legacy ==
A full corpus of Nemțeanu's renditions from Goethe, Schiller, Lenau, Charles Baudelaire and Victor Hugo, as well as sampled early poetry of his own, was first collected in book form posthumously, as Antologie (1926). The editor was Dragomirescu. Overall, however, "his oeuvre [remained] scattered just about everywhere, in various newspapers or magazines, without anyone feeling the imperious duty of collecting it." A Barbu Nemțeanu literary society and magazine existed for a while in the 1920s. By 1923, he had also been rediscovered as a proletarian poet, and recited as such at the Dimitrie Marinescu Circle (organized by Ion Popescu-Puțuri and others) by workers also active within the Unified Trade Unions.

In June 1925, the sixth commemoration of Nemțeanu's death was marked by a literary gathering; speakers included Cocea, Fischer-Galați, Lăzăreanu, Peltz, and politician Grigore Trancu-Iași, as well as Jacob Sternberg—the latter recited a piece by Nemțeanu in Steinberg's own Yiddish translation. Literary colleagues of an ethnic Romanian background had contrasting reactions to his death and legacy. The Christian humanist Gala Galaction once noted catching glimpses of his grave "from out my window"—seen by journalist and biographer Victor Frunză as a discreet tribute to the late poet. This perspective is positively compared by Frunză with a sarcastic epigram by Cincinat Pavelescu, which works in a pun on the verb a (se) împământeni ("to be naturalized", but also "to be one with the ground"):

Aci zace B. Nemțeanu
Fost poet israelit.
Mult a pătimit sărmanu'
Pân' s-a împământenit.

Translation:

Here lieth B. Nemțeanu,
Poet of the Jewish race.
The man suffered, he was due;
In this ground he found a place.

In May 1934, Tony Nemțeanu hosted in Galați a festival honoring her late husband; one of her letters beseeches the local town hall to sponsor a new edition of his verse. Her and Barbu's two daughters were by then locally famous as a vaudeville act at the Alhambra. The following year, Galați poet Emil Maur authored a piece calling Nemțeanu "one of the few whose names honor this city", claiming: "He died because he was a destitute poet in a well-off society, one which still won't comprehend its obligations toward the exponents of Romanian culture." Nemțeanu's satirical depictions of Galați were becoming widely known and embarrassing for the city bourgeoisie; they were also replicated in parody form by another local, George Mihăilescu-Anonimu, for the newspaper Acțiunea. Also at that stage, Emil Biedrzycki translated some of Nemțeanu's verse into Polish, including it in his 1935 anthology of Romanian poetry.

In February 1938, poet Radu Gyr, of the fascist Iron Guard, contended that, though seemingly innocuous, writers such as Nemțeanu, Constantin Dobrogeanu Gherea, Ronetti Roman and Ion Trivale had inaugurated a "Judaic invasion" in the realm of Romanian literature, creating room for Felix Aderca, Alexandru Robot and Mihail Sebastian—who exhibited "their sexual pathology and their Judaic negation". Nemțeanu's Jewish origin resulted in a posthumous ban of his poetry, as ordered by the Ion Antonescu regime during most of World War II. Fascist censorship was defied by George Călinescu, who covered Nemțeanu and other Jewish writers in his 1941 treatise on Romanian literature. One diary entry by Emil Dorian also suggests that the regime failed in purging their work from public view: at least one Romanian textbook still included "one of my poems and two of Barbu Nemțeanu's".

A reevaluation of Nemțeanu's work also took place after the establishment of Communist Romania. Șoitu, who in 1964 was working on a Nemțeanu monograph, declared him the most productive writer in Galați's entire history. As he put it at the time: "Suffering the same tragic fate as other artists under the bourgeois regime, B. Nemțeanu has been cast into oblivion, his work scattered under the dust settling on magazine and newspaper pages. [...] It is high time that the wide-reaching reconsideration of cultural values also work on restoring to his proper place this forgotten and maligned poet." In 1969, samples of his Baudelaire renditions were included in a definitive corpus of best Romanian translations from Les Fleurs du mal (most of these contributions were by Alexandru A. Philippide). Another anthology of his poetic output appeared in 1973, care of Ion Dodu Bălan. Nemțeanu's life and work were revisited during the late stages of communism by researcher Ovid Crohmălniceanu, as one of Crohmălniceanu's main contributions in Revista Cultului Mozaic. Such works marked Crohmălniceanu's return to his Jewish roots, and included memoirs of his own childhood in Galați.
