= Ciucani =

Ciucani may refer to several villages in Romania:

- Ciucani, a village in Răcăciuni Commune, Bacău County
- Ciucani, a village in Sânmartin, Harghita
