= State Jewish Theater =

State Jewish Theater may refer to:

- State Jewish Theater (Romania)
- Moscow State Jewish Theatre, Russia
