= Jewish cemetery on Sevastopol Street =

Former Jewish cemetery in Bucharest, Romania

- Interactive map of Jewish cemetery on Sevastopol Street

Details
- Established: 1853
- Location: 13 – 17 Sebastopol Street, Bucharest, Romania
- Coordinates: 44.450207°N 26.085530°E,
- Type: Jewish (Sephardi and Ashkenazi)
- Size: 69 ha (170 acres)

The Jewish cemetery on Sevastopol Street (Romanian: Cimitirul evreiesc din strada Sevastopol) is a former Sephardi and Ashkenazi Jewish cemetery located in Sector 1, Bucharest. At the moment of its demolition it was the oldest Jewish cemetery in Bucharest.

It was destroyed by order of Ion Antonescu between 1942 and 1944, with other buildings being constructed on the site afterward.

== History ==
The cemetery was initially founded on Filipescu Street, which was later renamed to Sevastopol Street after the Crimean War.

One of the last people buried here was Dr. Iuliu Barasch in 1863. In 1864, the cemetery closed as it had reached full capacity. By the time of its closure, 1,920 Jews had been buried there, with the oldest tombstone dating back to 1716. After its closure, the Sephardic and Ashkenazi communities each acquired separate burial grounds, which are today known as the Bucharest Sephardic Jewish Cemetery and the Filantropia Israelite Cemetery in Bucharest, respectively.

== Demolition ==
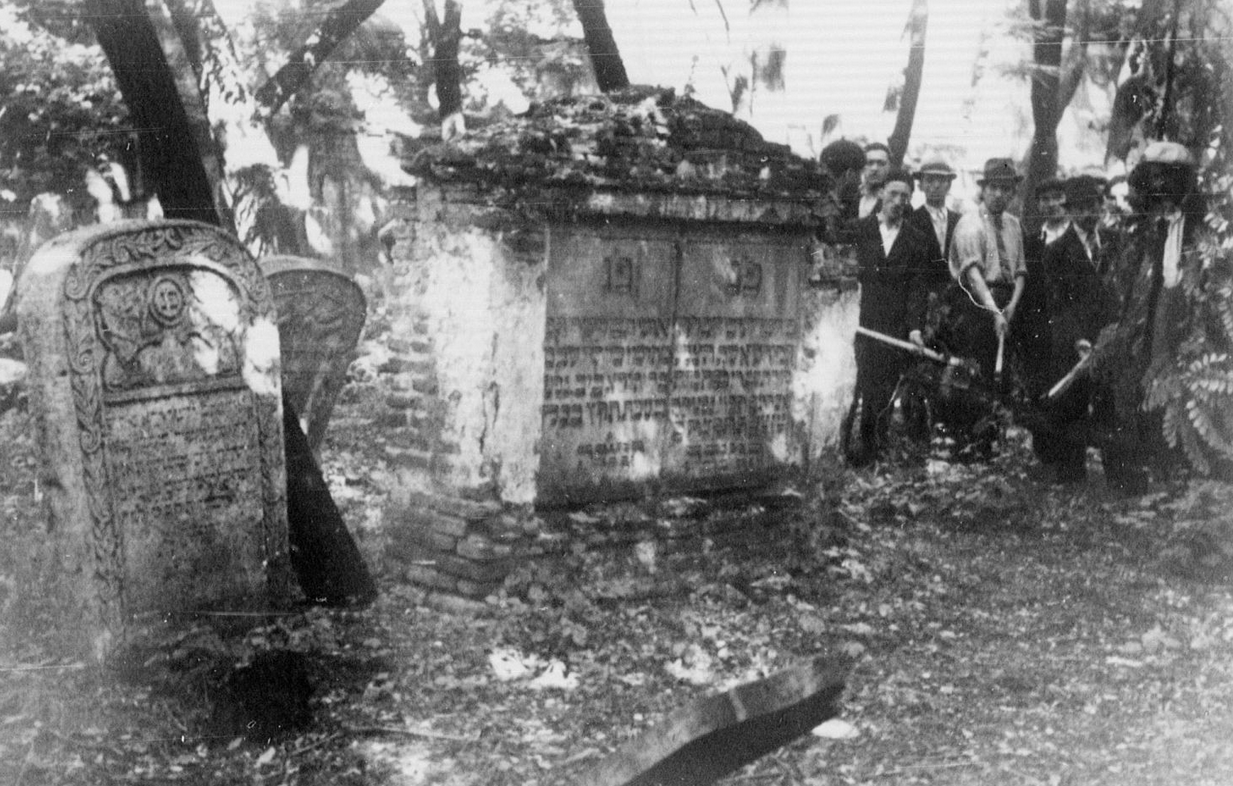
Cemetery dismission by Jewish labor conscripts

In 1913, the Bucharest City hall ordered the closure of the cemetery, though this directive was only implemented during the regime of Ion Antonescu.

At a Second Antonescu cabinet meeting on October 8, 1940, General Ion Antonescu proposed the relocation of Jewish cemeteries from Bucharest, suggesting that new burial sites be identified at a distance of 100 km. To avoid the perception of the measure as explicitly anti-Jewish, it was presented as a public health initiative.

Subsequently, in 1942, the cemetery was expropriated, and the Jewish community was compelled to donate the land to the municipality of Bucharest. Between the summer of 1942 and July 1944, the graves were exhumed by a Jewish forced labor detachment. The remains were transferred to the city's remaining three Jewish cemeteries, while unidentified remains were interred in a mass grave. Some tombstones were relocated to the cemetery at 162 Giurgiului Road, while others were looted by locals or destroyed.

The land was sold to an urban development company, but dismantling of the cemetery was halted on August 23, 1944, leaving only 25 graves intact. A few surviving tombstones are now scattered throughout the Jewish Cemetery on Giurgiului Road.

== See also ==
- Bucharest Sephardic Jewish Cemetery
- Filantropia Israelite Cemetery in Bucharest
