= Boulevard theatre (aesthetic) =

Theatrical aesthetic

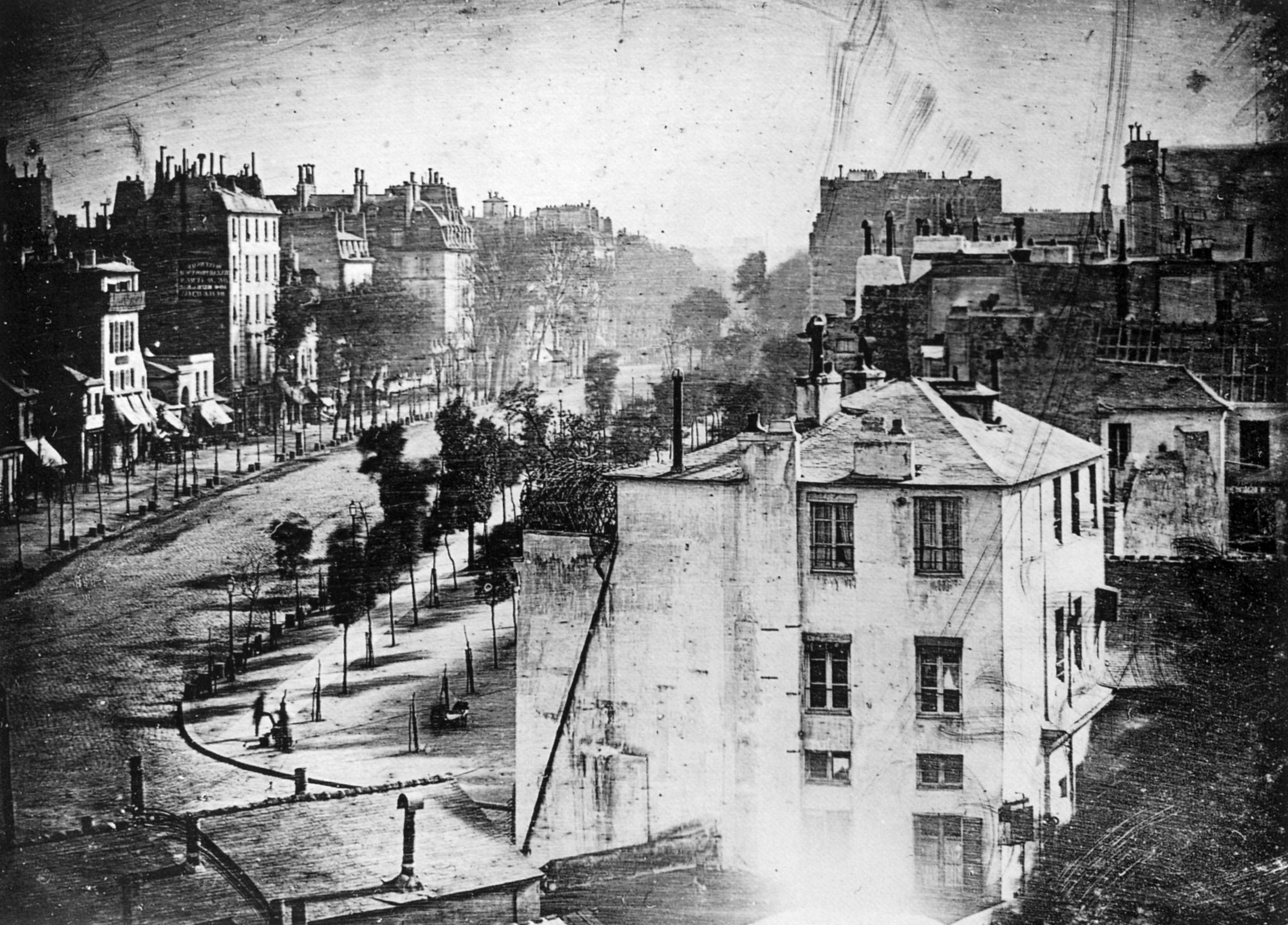
The boulevard du Temple in 1838 (daguerréotype by Louis Daguerre)

Boulevard theatre is a theatrical aesthetic that emerged from the boulevards of Paris' old city.

== Origin ==
Starting from the second half of the 18th century, popular and bourgeois theatre alike took up residence on the boulevard du Temple, then nicknamed 'boulevard du Crime' due to the many melodramas and murder stories shown there. In addition to the many attractions on display there – fireworks, pantomime, acrobats, etc. – a so-called 'boulevard' repertoire emerged separate from upper-class theatre. Then, starting from the Second French Empire, genre of comedies known as "vaudeville" and "comédie d'intrigue' arrived on the scene. While the Boulevard du Temple lost many theaters during the renovation of Paris, other venues, not necessarily located in boulevards, continued to carry the tradition of popular entertainment from earlier decades. Over time, "boulevard theatre" came to refer more to a form of mainstream theatre entertainment than to a venue actually situated on a boulevard.

== Association with the "French farce" genre ==
Though boulevard theatres may offer dramas, this type of venue is commonly associated with comedies, and in particular with a category of farces (known in French as vaudevilles) that developed during the second half of the 19th century, to the extent that in French, théâtre de boulevard (boulevard theatre) is commonly used as a synonym for that genre. Such plays typically involve social satire, particularly of the bourgeoisie, misunderstandings, and sexual or romantic intrigue that may place them in the category of bedroom farces.

== List of playwrights ==
- Marcel Achard
- Jean Anouilh
- Émile Augier
- Marcel Aymé
- Pierre Barillet
- Henry Bataille
- Henry Becque
- Tristan Bernard
- Henri Bernstein
- Paul Bilhaud
- Alexandre Bisson
- Henri-Frédéric Blanc
- Édouard Bourdet
- Alexandre Breffort
- Marc Camoletti
- Isabelle Candelier
- Alfred Capus
- Gaston Arman de Caillavet
- Henri Chivot
- Jean Cocteau
- Georges Courteline
- Henry de Gorsse
- Lucien Descaves
- Jacques Deval
- Maurice Donnay
- Françoise Dorin
- Alexandre Dumas, fils
- Georges Feydeau
- Robert de Flers
- Edmond Gondinet
- Jean-Pierre Gredy
- Roger Ferdinand
- Sacha Guitry
- Thomas-Simon Gueullette
- Maurice Hennequin
- A. de Herz
- Albert Husson
- Eugène Labiche
- Henri Lavedan
- Julien Luchaire
- Claude Magnier
- Félicien Marceau
- Georges Mitchell
- Marcel Mithois
- Maurice Ordonneau
- Marcel Pagnol
- René Charles Guilbert de Pixérécourt
- Jean Poiret
- Georges de Porto-Riche
- Claude-André Puget
- Isaia Răcăciuni
- Jules Romains
- Edmond Rostand
- André Roussin
- Armand Salacrou
- Victorien Sardou
- Jean Sarment
- Eugène Scribe
- Robert Thomas
- Ștefan Tita
- Albin Valabrègue
- Francis Veber
- Pierre Veber
- Louis Verneuil
- Pierre Wolff
- Maurice Yvain
