= Răcăciuni (river) =

- Location within Romania

Location
- Country: Romania
- Counties: Bacău County
- Villages: Fundu Răcăciuni, Ciucani, Răcăciuni

Physical characteristics
- Mouth: Siret
  - location: near Răcăciuni
  - coordinates: 46.3246°N 27.0489°E
- Length: 21 km (13 mi)
- Basin size: 83 km^{2} (32 sq mi)

Basin features
- Progression: Siret→ Danube→ Black Sea
- Tributaries
  - left: Valea Lungă
  - right: Căprean
- River code: XII.1.60

The Răcăciuni is a right tributary of the river Siret in Romania. It flows into the Siret near the village Răcăciuni. Its length is 21 km (13 mi) and its basin size is 83 km^{2} (32 sq mi).
