= Iuliu Barasch =

Austrian Galician–born Romanian writer and physician (1815–1863)

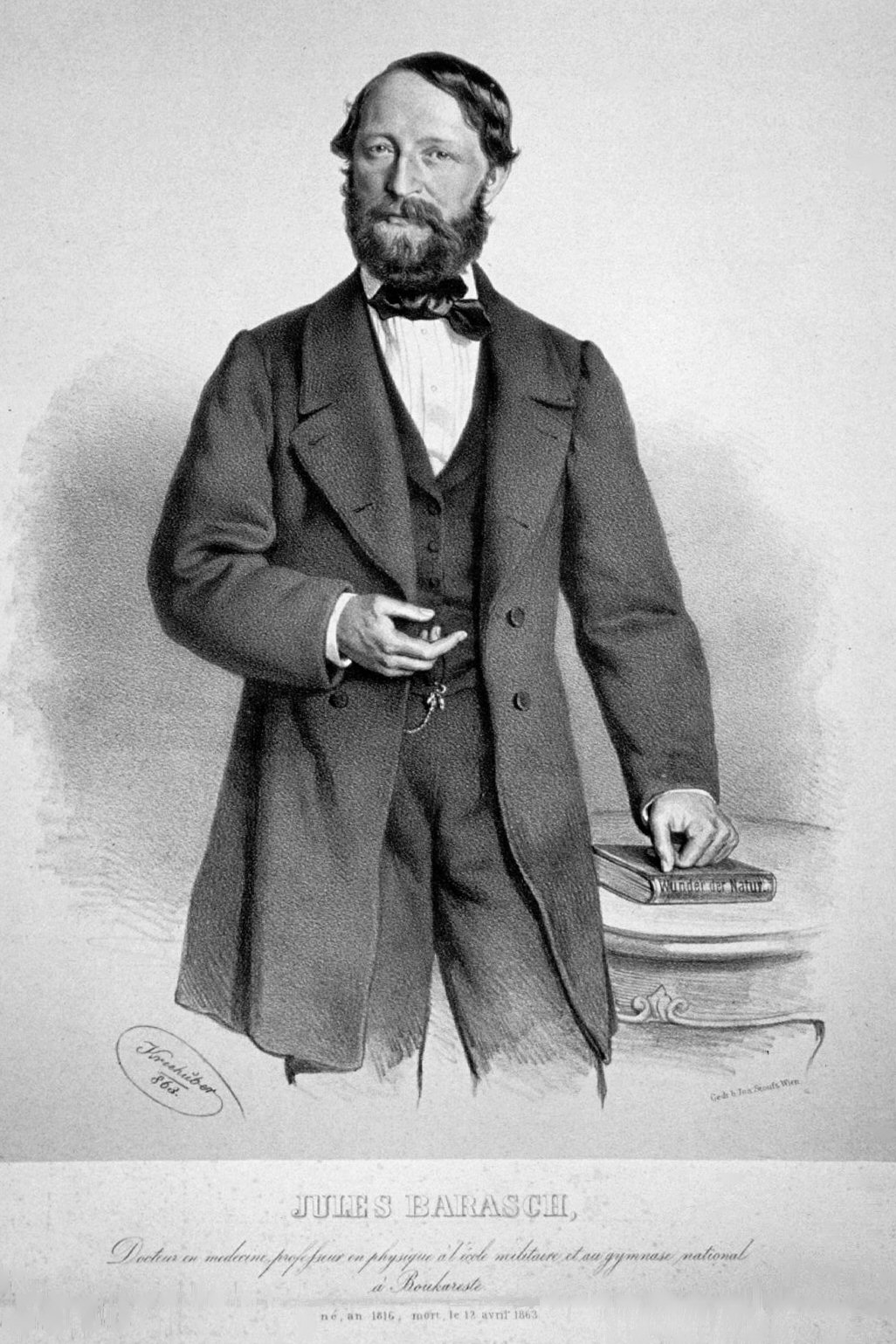
Juliu Barasch, Lithography by Josef Kriehuber, 1863

Iuliu Barasch or Baraș (17 July 1815 – 31 March 1863) was an Austrian Galician–born Romanian medical doctor, philosopher, pedagogue and promoter of Romanian culture and science who made his career in Romania. He played a leading role in disseminating the ideas of the Haskalah, or Jewish Enlightenment, among the Jews of Bucharest.

== Biography ==
Yehuda ben Mordehai Barasch was born in Brody, Galicia (present-day western Ukraine, then part of the Austrian Empire), on 17 July 1815 into a Hasidic Jewish family. As a youth, he had a traditional Jewish education before eventually engaging with the ideas of the Haskalah. He studied philosophy from 1836 at Leipzig University and in 1839 changed to a doctorate of medicine at the University of Berlin, which he completed in 1841.

Barasch tried to settle in Moldavia, but the authorities refused to give him a licence to practice medicine, so he settled in Wallachia. In 1842, he was a physician in Călărași, then in 1845 in Craiova, and finally settled in Bucharest. He taught natural sciences at the Saint Sava Academy in 1852 and then was a professor at Bucharest's School of Medicine and Pharmacy.

Besides working as a doctor, he became a radical and Romanian patriot. He was a friend of C. A. Rosetti and Ion Heliade Rădulescu.

He was a popularizer of medical science and natural science in general, and the first Jewish Romanian journalist. From 1856 to 1859, he edited the journal Isis sau Natura (Isis or Nature), the first popular science magazine in Romania. The magazine published studies of astronomy, hypothetical articles about the plurality of worlds, or about the most popular inventions of the time, such as the aerostat and "submarine ships".

In 1858, Barasch was also the founder of the first children's hospital in Bucharest. From 1858 to 1860, he treated about 2,000 children in a 40-bed facility in his own house, in the Crucea de Piatră quarter of the Dudești neighborhood; in 1864, the hospital moved to a 90-bed facility in the Popa Tatu neighborhood.

In 1857, together with Aaron Aser and A. Vainberg, Barasch edited Israelitul Român ("The Romanian Israelite"), the first Romanian-language newspaper of the Jewish community in Romania, which was to remain in print for almost 100 years.

He died in Bucharest on 31 March 1863, at the age of 47. He was buried in Bucharest in the Jewish cemetery on Sevastopol Street. After the abolition of this cemetery in the 1940s during the Ion Antonescu regime, his tomb was moved to the Filantropia Israelite Cemetery and appeared on the List of Historical Monuments in Bucharest (2004). He is memorialized in Bucharest's historically Jewish Văcărești neighborhood, where the Barașeum Theater, now home to the State Jewish Theater, the adjoining Barașeum clinic, and the street that runs in front of the theater, formerly Ionescu de la Brad, now str. Dr. Iuliu Barasch, are all named in his honour.

== Publications ==
=== Books ===
- Minunile naturei (3 vol., 1852)
- Mineralogia, după Belez (1854)
- Asfixia sau leșinul (1854)
- Botanica, după Belez (1856)
- Higiena populară (1857)
- Zoologia (1857)
- Debora, melodrama (1858)
- Cărticica altoiului (1859)
- Manual de silvicultură (1861)

=== Journals ===
- Isis sau Natura (1856–1859)
- Natura (1861–1863)
- Israelitul Român (1857–)

== Bibliography ==
- The YIVO Encyclopedia of Jews in Eastern Europe
- Israil Bercovici, O sută de ani de teatru evreiesc în România ("One hundred years of Yiddish/Jewish theater in Romania"), 2nd Romanian-language edition, revised and augmented by Constantin Măciucă. Editura Integral (an imprint of Editurile Universala), Bucharest (1998), 185. ISBN 973-98272-2-5. See the article on the author for further publication information.
- Dimitrie R. Rosetti (1897) Dicționarul contimporanilor, Editura Lito-Tipografiei "Populara"
- Florin Manolescu, Literatura S.F., Editura Univers, Bucharest, 1980
