= Răcăciuni =

- Commune
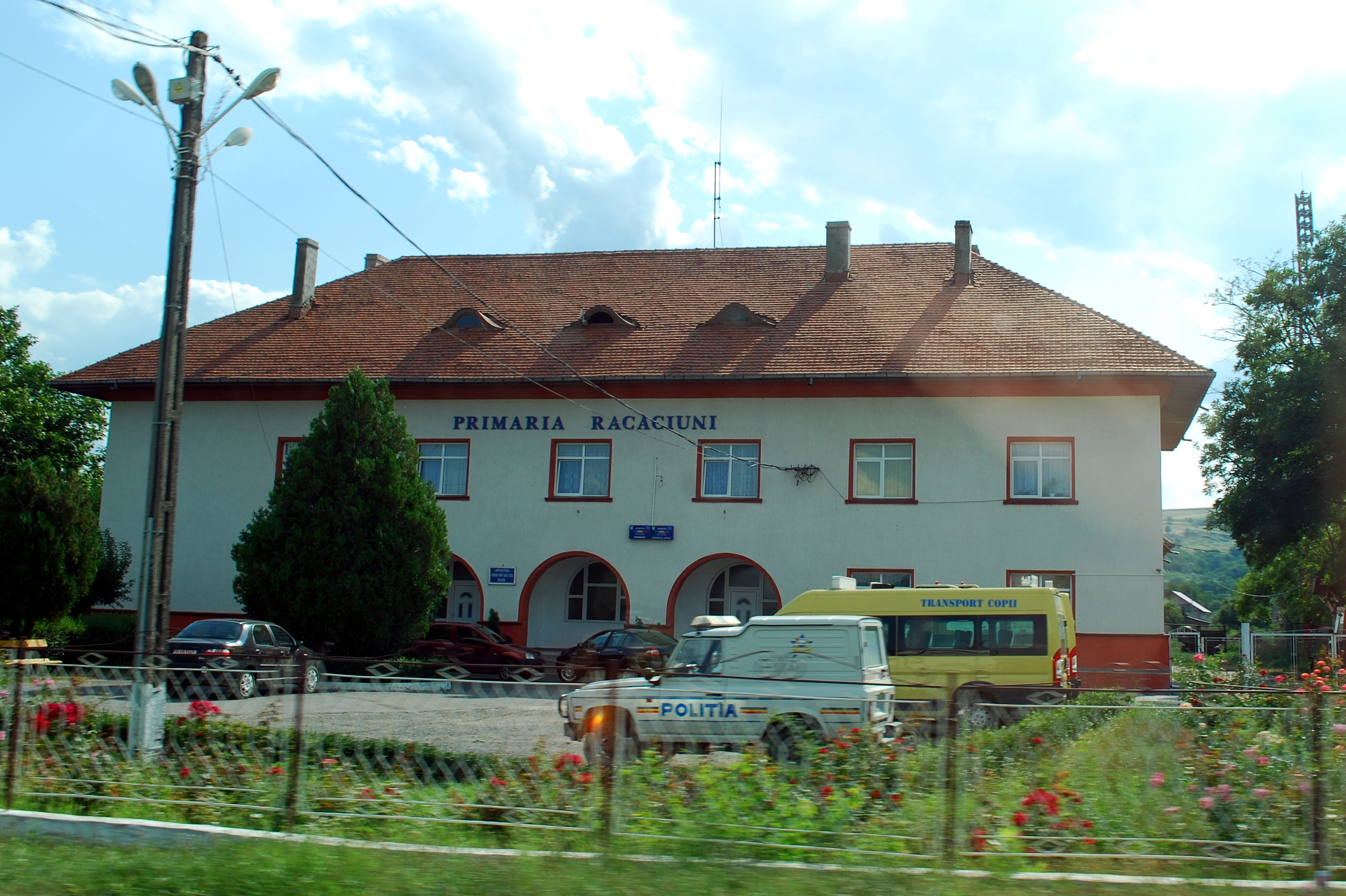
- Răcăciuni town hall

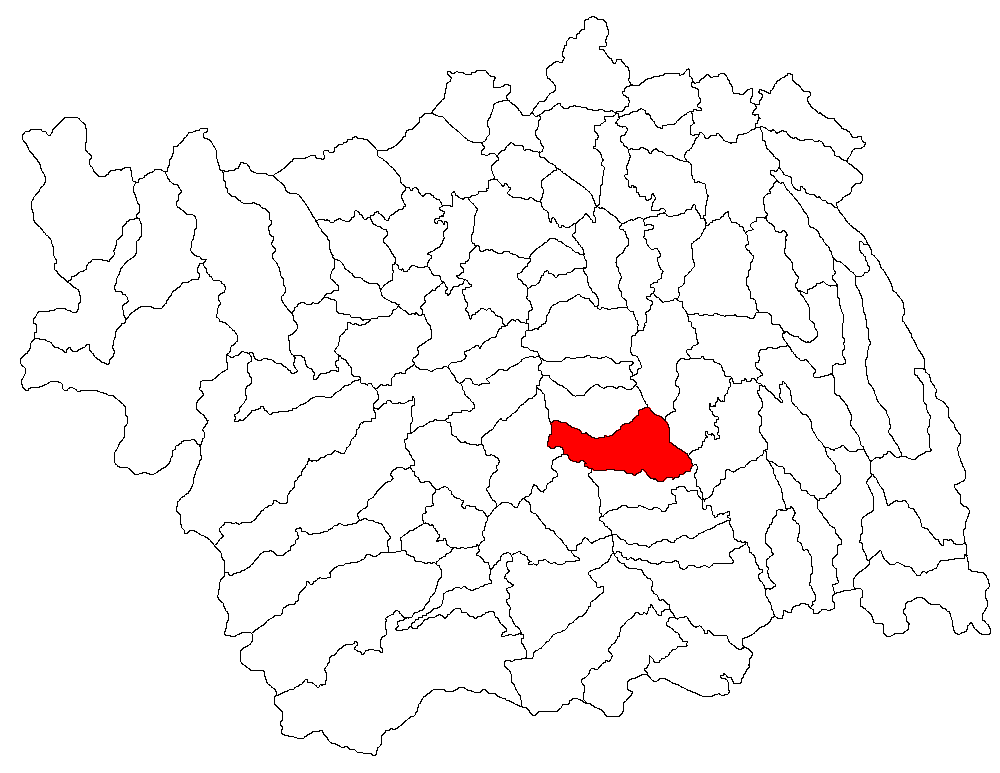
- Location in Bacău County

- Location in Romania
- Coordinates: 46°20′N 27°00′E
- Country: Romania
- County: Bacău

Government
  - Mayor (2024–2028): Lucian Cheța (PSD)
- Area: 81.79 km^{2} (31.58 sq mi)
- Elevation: 290 m (950 ft)
- Population (2021-12-01): 7,069
  - Density: 86.43/km^{2} (223.8/sq mi)
- Time zone: UTC+02:00 (EET)
  - Summer (DST): UTC+03:00 (EEST)
- Postal code: 607480
- Area code: +(40) 234
- Vehicle reg.: BC
- Website: www.comunaracaciuni.ro

Răcăciuni (Hungarian: Rekecsin) is a commune in Bacău County, Western Moldavia, Romania. It is composed of six villages: Ciucani, Fundu Răcăciuni, Gheorghe Doja, Gâșteni, Răcăciuni, and Răstoaca.

== Geography ==
The commune is located in the south-central part of the county, on the right back of the Siret River, next to the Răcăciuni dam and reservoir. The river Răcăciuni flows through the commune, reaching there the Siret.

Răcăciuni is crossed by the DN2 road, which connects the county seat, Bacău, to Focșani and forms part of the European route E85. On the eastern side of the commune is the Răcăciuni railway station, serving the Căile Ferate Române Line 500 that runs from Bucharest to Focșani, Bacău, and on north to the Ukrainian border. The A7 and A13 motorways, the latter which would serve as a connection between Western Moldavia and Southern Transylvania, are planned to meet on the south-eastern side of the commune.

== History ==
During the interwar period, the commune was the seat of Plasa Răcăciuni.

== Demographics ==
At the 2011 census, the commune had 7,252 inhabitants; of those, 91.12% were ethnic Romanians, 4.36% Hungarians, and 1.78% Roma. At the 2002 census, 51.3% were Roman Catholic, 47.7% Romanian Orthodox, 0.6% Seventh-day Adventist, and 0.4% Pentecostal. At the 2021 census, Răcăciuni had a population of 7,069; of those, 87.18% were Romanians and 2.62% Hungarians.

== Natives ==
- Isaia Răcăciuni (born Isaia Nacht; 1900–1976), Romanian writer and editor
