= Filantropia Israelite Cemetery in Bucharest =

Jewish cemetery in Bucharest, Romania

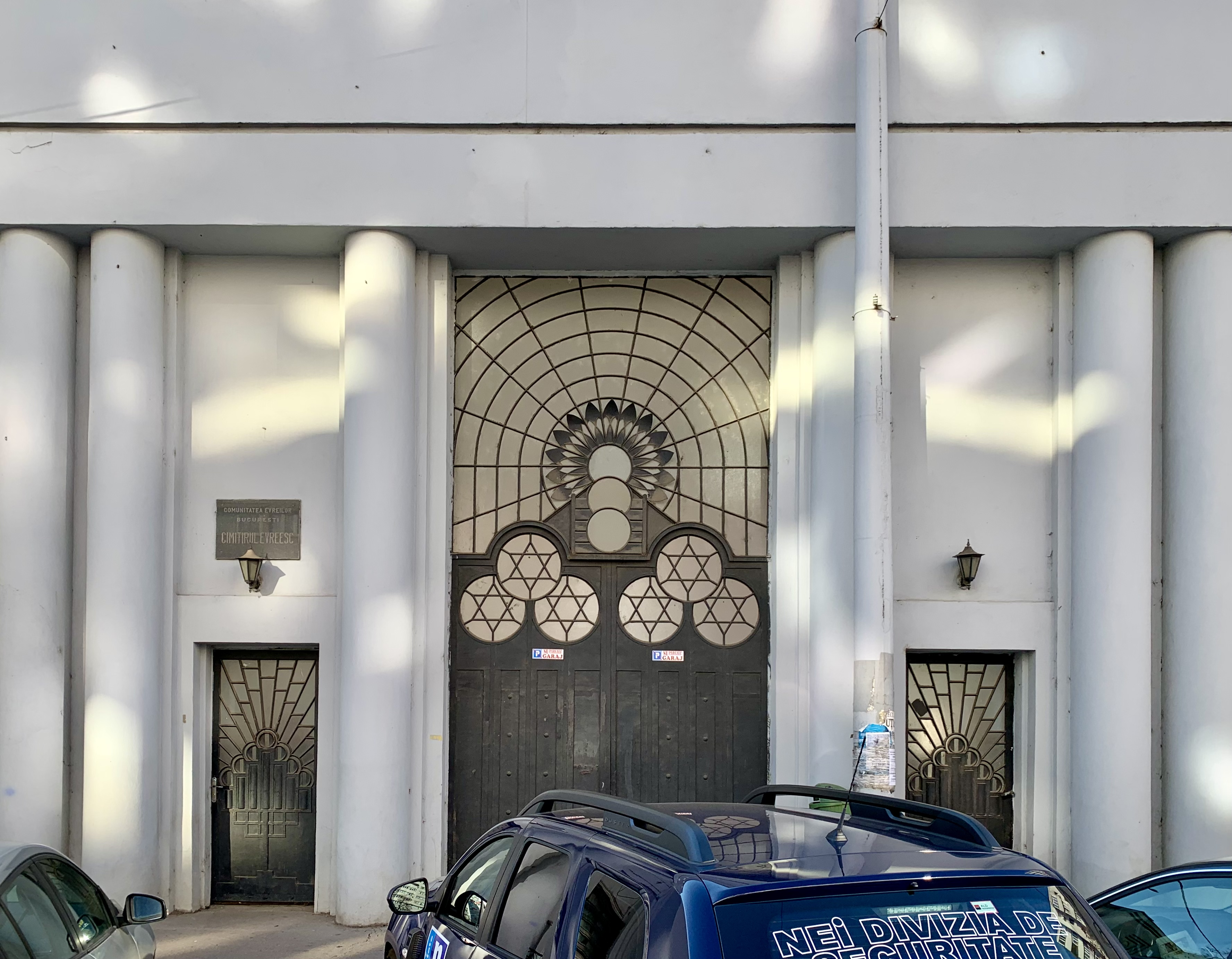
- Entrance to the cemetery

Details
- Established: 1865
- Location: Bd. Ion Mihalache nr. 89-91, Bucharest, Romania
- Coordinates: 44.457815°N 26.072672°E
- Type: Jewish (Ashkenazi Jews)
- Size: 69 ha (170 acres)
- No. of graves: 29,000

The Filantropia Israelite Cemetery in Bucharest (Romanian: Cimitirul evreiesc Filantropia din București) is an Ashkenazi Jews cemetery located in Sector 1, Bucharest. It is one of three active Jewish cemeteries still in existence in Bucharest.

== Chapel ==
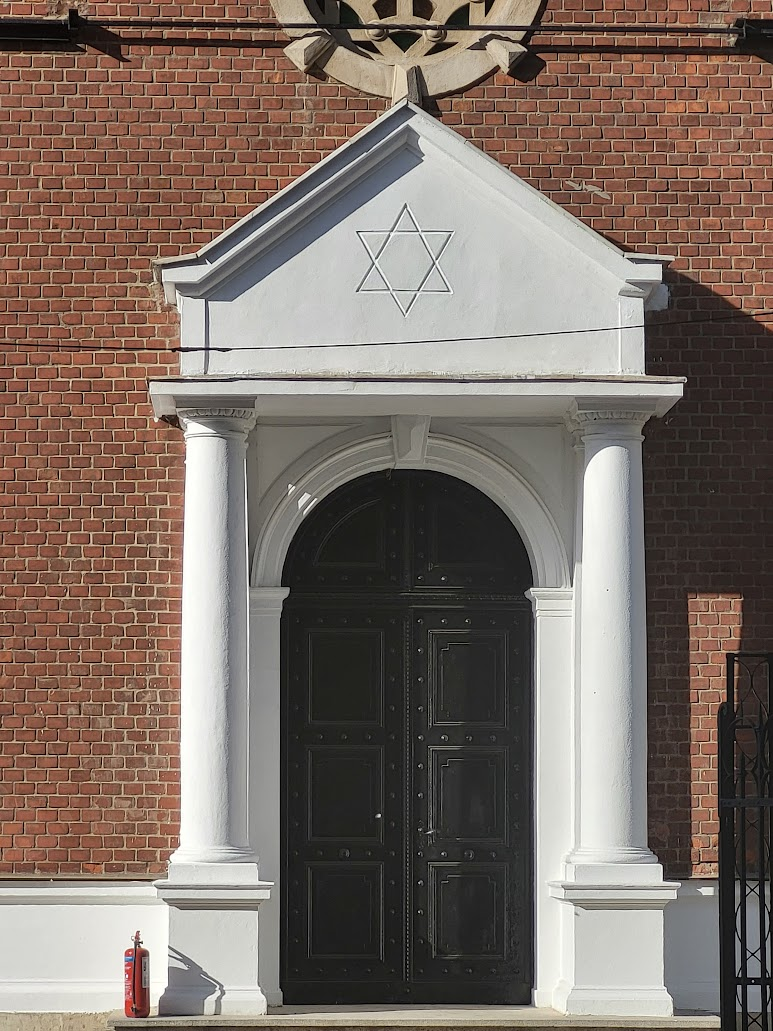
Chapel door details

Just beyond the gate stands a cemetery chapel - a square building topped by five cupolas. The chapel was constructed in 1908 by the Sacred Burial Society of Western Rite Israelis. The architect behind the design was Leonida Negrescu (Leon Schwartz). It suffered damage during the earthquake on November 10, 1940. After extensive repairs and re-consecration, it reopened on September 14, 1941. The chapel was also reinforced following the earthquake on March 4, 1977. It is a robust construction in Moorish style, with Romanesque and Neoclassical elements.

== Tombstones and monuments ==
The Filantropia Cemetery features a diverse array of civil tombstones, from traditional stelae to more elaborate monuments commemorating the affluent of the early twentieth century. Many bear the signatures of renowned stonemasons like S. Goldeanu, whose nearby workshop produced about 30 headstones, ranging from grand mausoleums to simpler plaques. Other noted craftsmen include J. Heidenreich, known for his black marble obelisks, and L. Martinis.

Additionally, some families imported tombstones from Vienna, enriching the cemetery's collection with works by makers such as Nfg. Schulz and Wulkan & Neubrunn. The cemetery also uniquely displays emblems of various support associations, such as the First Fraternal Association for Care about Sick and Funerals in Bucharest. These emblems highlight the community's support networks, underscoring the social and communal underpinnings of these memorial traditions.

== People ==
The cemetery hosts over 29,000 tombstones, including some transferred from the former Jewish cemetery on Sevastopol Street, which was the oldest Jewish cemetery in Bucharest and was abolished during the Holocaust under the Ion Antonescu regime.

Approximately 98% of the graves here no longer have living relatives associated with them, and as such, are not visited by anyone.

Many prominent figures in Romanian culture are buried here, including Iosif Sava, Hero Lupescu, Moni Ghelerter, Dr. Leon Ghelerter, Max Bănuș, Nicolae Cajal, and Mihail Sebastian. An alley in the "Filantropia" cemetery is named after the translator and poet Barbu Nemțeanu (the literary pseudonym of Benjamin Deutsch).

The cemetery also includes the grave of Jacob Marmorosch, owner of Banca Marmorosch Blank, who financed Romania's military efforts during World War I.

Along the main alley and in the center of the cemetery, two monuments commemorate Jewish Romanian citizens who sacrificed their lives for their country in World War I. The monuments are surrounded by the graves of these heroes. Each year, a commemoration is organized by the Federation of Jewish Communities in Romania and the Romanian Ministry of National Defense.

Additionally, some remains from the Sevastopol Jewish Cemetery, dismantled and evacuated during Ion Antonescu's regime, have been relocated here.

Two monuments in the Filantropia Cemetery, namely the Tomb of Dr. Iuliu Barasch and the "Monument of the Heroes of 1916-1918," are listed in the List of Historical Monuments in the Municipality of Bucharest (2004). Dr. Barasch, a prominent figure in cultural and scientific circles, was initially buried in the Jewish cemetery on Sevastopol Street before being relocated to Filantropia following the former's closure.

== See also ==
Bucharest Sephardic Jewish Cemetery
