= Israil Bercovici =

Romanian writer (1921–1988)

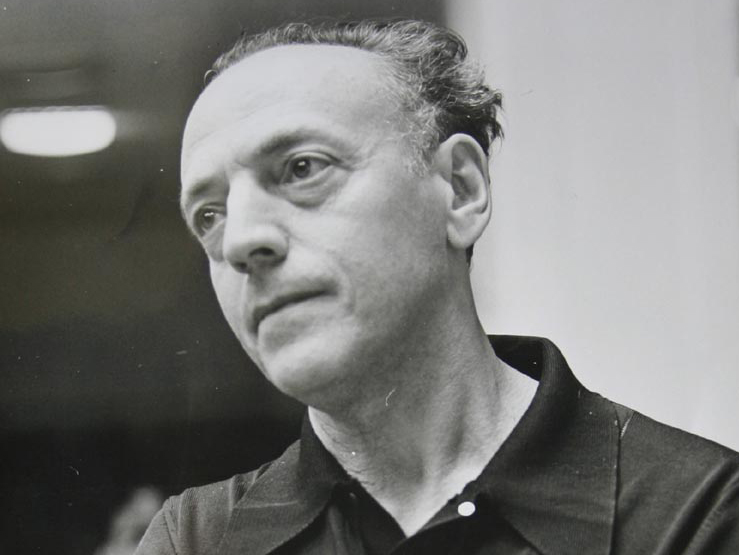
- Born: 1921
- Died: 1988 (aged 66–67)
- Spouse: Miriam Korber
- Children: Ada Bercovici
- Writing career
- Genres: Theater, poetry

Israil Bercovici (Romanian pronunciation: [israˈil ˈberkovit͡ʃʲ], Yiddish: ישראל בערקאָװיטש, romanized: Yisrael Berkovitsh; 1921–1988) was a Jewish Romanian dramaturg, playwright, director, biographer, and memoirist, who served the State Jewish Theater of Romania between 1955 and 1982; he also wrote Yiddish-language poetry.

== Biography ==
Bercovici was born into a poor working-class family in Botoșani, Romania, and received a traditional Jewish education. During World War II he served in a compulsory labor camp until the arrival of the Soviet Army in Romania.

After the war, he began his career in Yiddish-language newspapers and radio, notably the weekly IKUF-Bleter (1946–1953), and the Revista Cultului Mozaic din R.P.R. (Journal of the Jewish Communities in the People's Republic of Romania, also known as Tsaytshrift). The Journal was launched in 1956 and had sections in Romanian, Yiddish and Hebrew. Bercovici edited the Yiddish section from 1970 to 1972.

As a literature student after the war at a secular secondary school in Bucharest, Bercovici published his first Yiddish-language poetry in IKUF-Bleter. Judging by theater reviews he wrote in the early 1950s, he appears to have been an ardent Communist, grateful for his liberation from the labor camp and for the opportunity to receive a secular education, advocating a socialist realist aesthetic for Yiddish-language theater.

His affiliation with the State Jewish Theater began in 1955, initially as "literarischer Sekretär". He continued to be very aware of developments in theater beyond the Yiddish language: he drove the theater toward being a contemporary theater, rather than a mere museum of inherited plays. Elvira Groezinger compares his goals to those of New York City's Arbeter Teater Farband (ARTEF, "Workers' Theatre Association"), goals well-aligned with Communism.

Bercovici translated works from world literature: Friedrich Dürrenmatt's Frank V (1964), Karl Gutzkow's Uriel Acosta (1968), and Henrik Ibsen's The Master Builder (1972), and wrote his own Yiddish-language plays, including Der goldener fodem ("The Golden Thread", 1963), about Abraham Goldfaden (who in 1876 founded the world's first Yiddish-language theater, in Iaşi, Romania), and the musical revue A shnirl perl ("A Pearl Necklace", 1967). He also wrote books about Yiddish theater history.

In 1976 he directed a celebration of 100 years of Yiddish theatre in Romania, which included not only performances of his own work but also those of Goldfaden and Sholem Aleichem.

Toward the end of Bercovici's career, in Romania, as elsewhere in Europe, Yiddish was a language in decline. The State Jewish Theater coped, in part, by installing headphones throughout the theater to allow simultaneous translation of the plays into Romanian; the system is still in use when the theater performs Yiddish-language plays today.

Bercovici's 3000-volume Yiddish-language library is now part of the University Library in Potsdam.

== Personal life ==
Bercovici married Miriam Korber. They had a daughter, Ada, who was a university professor.

== Works for theater ==
The following list is drawn from Bercovici's own history of Yiddish theater in Romania ([Bercovici 1998]). The list may be incomplete; many of Bercovici's works were musical and folkloric revues and some were reworkings of Purim plays. The music for most of Bercovici's plays was composed by Haim Schwartzmann; "The Golden Thread" also uses music by Avram Goldfaden, whom the play is about. Schwartzmann and Eugen Koffler contributed music for A Pearl Necklace and Baraşeum '72; Mangheriada used music by Schwartzmann, Koffler, Dubi Seltzer, Henech Kon, and Simha Schwartz; a 1976 production of "The Golden Thread" credits additional music by Adalbert Winkler.

The list contains Romanian-language titles and Yiddish-language titles with Romanian phonetic transcription. Some works had only a Romanian language title; when titles in both languages are given by Bercovici, the Romanian title precedes the Yiddish. Unless otherwise noted, the date given is that of first performance by the State Jewish Theater.

- Revista revistelor ("Revue of Revues"), December 15, 1958.
- Un cîntec şi o glumă / A lid mit a viţ ("A Song and a Joke"), April 15, 1958.
- O revistă cu Ahaşveroş ("A revue with Ahasuerus"), December 30, 1959.
- Ciri-biri-bom, cowritten with Aurel Storin, Moişe Bălan, Malvina Cohn, December 30, 1960.
- Oaspeţi în Oraş / Ghest in ştot ("Guests in the City"), April 15, 1961.
- O seară de folclor evreiesc / An ovnt fun idişn folklor ("An Evening of Yiddish Folklore"), October 4, 1962.
- Cu cîntec spre stele / Mit a lid ţu di ştern ("With a Song to the Stars"), February 13, 1963.
- Purim-şpil ("Purim play"), March 24, 1963.
- Recital de dansuri, versuri şi cîntece ("Dance, Poetry and Song Show"), April 7, 1963.
- Spectacol de umor şi folclor muzical evreiesc / Idişer humor un musicakişer folklor ("Yiddish Humor and Musical Folklore")
- Firul de aur / Der goldener fodem ("The Golden Thread"), October 25, 1963.
- Un şirag de perle / A şnirl perl ("A String of Pearls"), April 2, 1967.
- Amintiri de revelion / Nai-iur-zihroines ("New Year's Memories"), December 31, 1967.
- Cîntarea cîntărilor ("Song of Songs"), an experimental Romanian-language theater piece, based on Hebrew poetry, March 5, 1968.
- Mangheriada, based on the poems of Itzik Manger, April 6, 1968.
- Baraşeum '72, February 5, 1972. (Baraşeum was the old name of the future State Jewish Theater, honoring Jewish culture promoter, Dr. Iuliu Barasch.)
- Scrisori pe portativ ("Letters on a Musical Staff"), August 16, 1975.

== Published works ==
Bercovici published three major books of Yiddish poetry:

- In di oygn fun a shvartser kave (1974, "In the Eyes of a Black Coffee") Published in Romanian translation in 1991 as În ochii unei cafele negre.
- Funken iber doyres (1978, "Sparks Over Generations")
- Fliendike oysyes (1984, "Flying Letters")

In addition, Bercovici and Nana Cassian translated into Romanian the work of Yiddish-language poet Itzik Manger. A volume of these translations was published in 1983 as Balada evreului care a ajuns de la ceneşiu la albastru ("Jewish ballads that have gone from gray to blue").

He also published on the history of the Yiddish Theatre in Romania:

- Bukareshter yidisher melukhe-teater 25: 1948-1973 (1973)
- Hundert yor Yidish teater in Rumenye, 1876-1976 (1976, 100 years of Yiddish Theatre in Romania) Published in Romanian translation by Constantin Măciucă in 1982 as O suta de ani de teatru evreiesc în România: 1876-1976; in 1998 the second, revised and expanded edition was published.

== See also ==
- List of Jewish Romanians
