= State Jewish Theater (Romania) =

Coordinates: 44°25′45.81″N 26°6′37.88″E

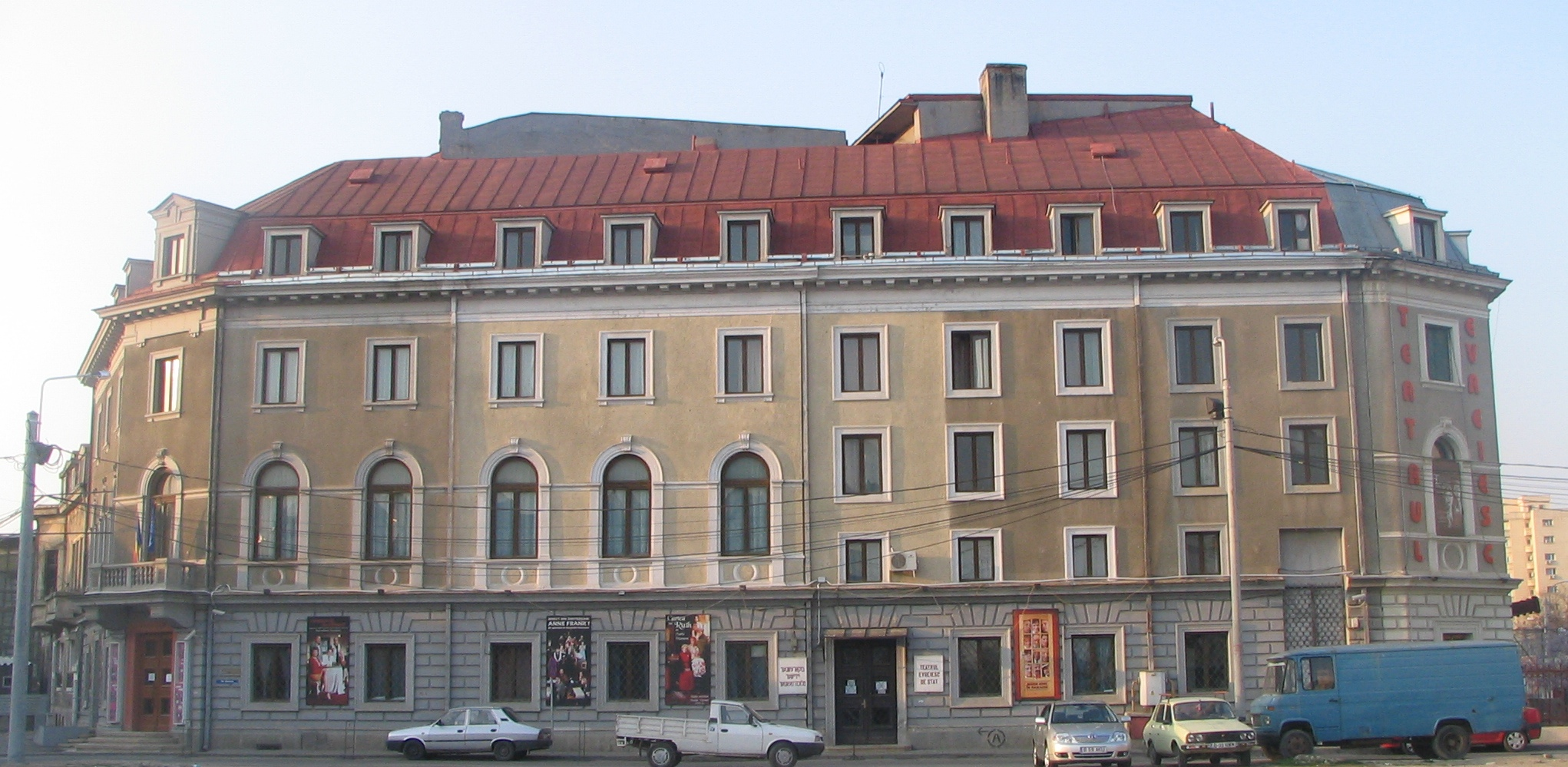
State Jewish Theatre

Teatrul Evreiesc de Stat (TES, the State Jewish Theater) in Bucharest, Romania is a theater specializing in Jewish-related plays. It is the oldest Yiddish-language theater with uninterrupted activity in the world. Its contemporary repertoire includes plays by Jewish authors, plays on Jewish topics, and plays in Yiddish (which are performed with simultaneous translation into Romanian, using headphones installed in the theater in the 1970s). Many of the plays also feature Jewish actors.

A precursor, the Teatru Evreiesc Baraşeum operated as a Jewish theater through most of World War II, although they were closed during the few months of the National Legionary State, and thereafter performed in Romanian rather than Yiddish through until the fall of Ion Antonescu.

== Prehistory ==
The Jewish Theatre in Romania has a tradition dating back to the 19th century. The first newspaper reference to a Jewish theater in Romania was a review by Mihai Eminescu in the Romanian newspaper Curierul de Iaşi (The Courier of Iaşi) in 1876, in which he described a troupe of six Jewish actors who performed in the famous Green Tree garden of Iaşi under Avram Goldfaden’s management, the father of the modern Jewish Theatre.

In Bucharest, the theater building, the Teatru Baraşeum or Sala Baraşeum, was used from the early 1930s as a Yiddish-language theater, originally under private management. The theater was named in honor of Dr. Iuliu Barasch, as was an adjoining clinic. (The street it is on, the former str. Ionescu de la Brad, is now str. Dr. Iuliu Barasch.) On the verge of World War II, it was home of the Thalia company, one of four professional Yiddish theater companies in Bucharest at that time.

As war broke out in Europe and the antisemitic right-wing politics that had long been a factor in Romania came to the fore, resources for Yiddish theater in Bucharest dried up. In the summer of 1940, all four Bucharest-based Yiddish theater companies, including Thalia, set out on tours of the country rather than attempt summer theater in Bucharest. Thalia were on the road when King Carol II abdicated on September 6, 1940, the start of the National Legionary State under General (later Marshal) Ion Antonescu. The extremely antisemitic Iron Guard became the only legal political party in Romania. On September 9, Jews were prohibited from participating in theater. All Jews were fired from artistic or administrative positions at the National Theatre and others, and the country's Yiddish-language companies had their licenses revoked. Public use of the Yiddish language was also banned.

Nonetheless, after some petitioning, permission was obtained on September 26 to start a single Jewish theater in Bucharest, subject to conditions such as making donations to a fund for unemployed Christian actors, performing only in Romanian, and getting permission from the Military Commander of the capital. Some 200 people were associated with the group that emerged, ranging from performers of light comedy to actors versed in the method acting of Konstantin Stanislavski, and representing a wide range of politics and all levels of experience.

The company wanted to rent the Roxy Theater in the central Lipscani district, but were told that they would only be allowed to perform in the Jewish ghetto; the Baraşeum in the Văcăreşti neighborhood met this requirement.

Over the next six months, the company would struggle with the authorities over the conditions under which they could open, while awaiting the elusive permission from the Military Commander. A January 17, 1941 document from the Minister of Culture and from Director General of Theaters and Operas Liviu Rebreanu added new requirements: each individual artist would need approval from the Director General of Theaters; no plays could be performed on major Christian holidays, nor on the three "legionary holidays"; they could use only the front door of the Baraşeum on str. Ionescu de la Brad, not the stage door on str. Udricani; and they could not open until May 31, 1941, four and a half months away. Days after these requirements were put in place, the Iron Guard attempted a coup against Antonescu; the Guard's defeat resulted in a government less actively hostile to Jews. These new requirements were relaxed after the defeat of the Iron Guard, and Rebreanu wrote on February 19 that "in view of the current situation" they could open on March 1. The Military Commander never did give formal permission, but that requirement seems to have been ignored.

== Baraşeum Jewish Theater ==
On March 1, 1941 Teatrul Evreiesc Baraşeum (the Baraşeum Jewish Theater) opened with a revue, Ce faci astă seară? (What are you doing this evening?). Five days later they premiered a production of The Brothers Sanger by Margereth Kennedy. They changed the name to Gema and also substituted a different author's name (since they were only allowed to do plays by Jews).

During the war years, the Baraşeum Jewish Theater premiered over thirty productions, about half of them directed by Sandru Eliad. Although officially exclusively Jewish, at times various Gentile intellectuals helped the company illegally, especially with translations; this was well enough known to provoke indignation from at least one antisemitic newspaper. Some Gentiles, mostly intellectuals, showed support for the theater by coming to performances.

At times their plays were heavily censored. For example, on one occasion they were required to drop the lines "Je sais bien que demain tout peut changer" ("I know that tomorrow everything could change") and "L'histoire est à tournant" ("The story/history is at a turning point") from a French love song, lest they be understood politically. At other times, though, they sneaked in the occasional Yiddish-language joke or refrain.

Israil Bercovici, later a key figure in the State Jewish Theater, has said of this period that Jewish theater was pushed to the periphery, but "turned that periphery into a center of Jewish culture and art". Their included Romanian-language translations of classic Yiddish theater pieces such as the bittersweet Dos Groise Ghivens (The Big Lottery Ticket, a musical based on a story by Sholom Aleichem) and S. Ansky's The Dybbuk as well as new pieces, and performances of works by the acceptably Jewish Jacques Offenbach and Louis Verneuil.

On August 23, 1944 the overthrow of Antonescu in a coup led immediately to the re-legalization of the use of the Yiddish language. The Baraşeum returned to performing in Yiddish, presenting Sholom Aleichem's Mentshn (Men) on September 15. This Baraşeum production was not, however, the first Yiddish play after of the new period. On the very evening of August 23 an improvised Yiddish performance Nacht-Tog (Night-Day) took place in Botoşani — the town where, in 1876, Avram Goldfaden had presented one of the first professional Yiddish language productions, the first ever in an indoor theater.

== IKUF ==
This group who had improvised the play in Botoşani were part of the Yiddisher Kultur Ferband (IKUF). They would evolve and repeat their performance of Nacht-Tog. This performance was sharply divided into two parts, Nacht being the dark past and Tog expressing a belief in life. The play used songs both from the forced labor camps and from Yiddish theater before the war.

IKUF would become a key institution in the next few years, publishing a magazine IKUF Bleter, organizing libraries and conferences, and evolving Teatrul IKUF, a new Yiddish theater led initially by Iacob Mansdorf. Drawing its mostly young, professional actors from cities around Romania, their production of Moşe Pincevski's new play Ich Leb (I Live) about resistance in a forced labor camp put them on the map in a Bucharest where the Communist Party was moving toward hegemony. Ceremonies for the play's opening included a number of speakers, including Minister of Art Mihail Ralea and Iosif Eselaohn of the socialist party Ihud.

Mansdorf, according to Bercovici, tired of leading a theater troupe after only two years; some of his actors left with him. Others, including Sevilla Pastor, Dina König, Seidy Glück, Moris Siegler and Marcu Glückman, reorganized under Bernard Lebli, and became the new permanent company of the Baraşeum, with an unprecedented subsidy from the government. They began their new season January 11, 1948 with Dos Groise Ghivens; this was followed by Nekomenemer (The Song of War) by French Yiddish writer Haim Sloves.

== The State Jewish Theater ==
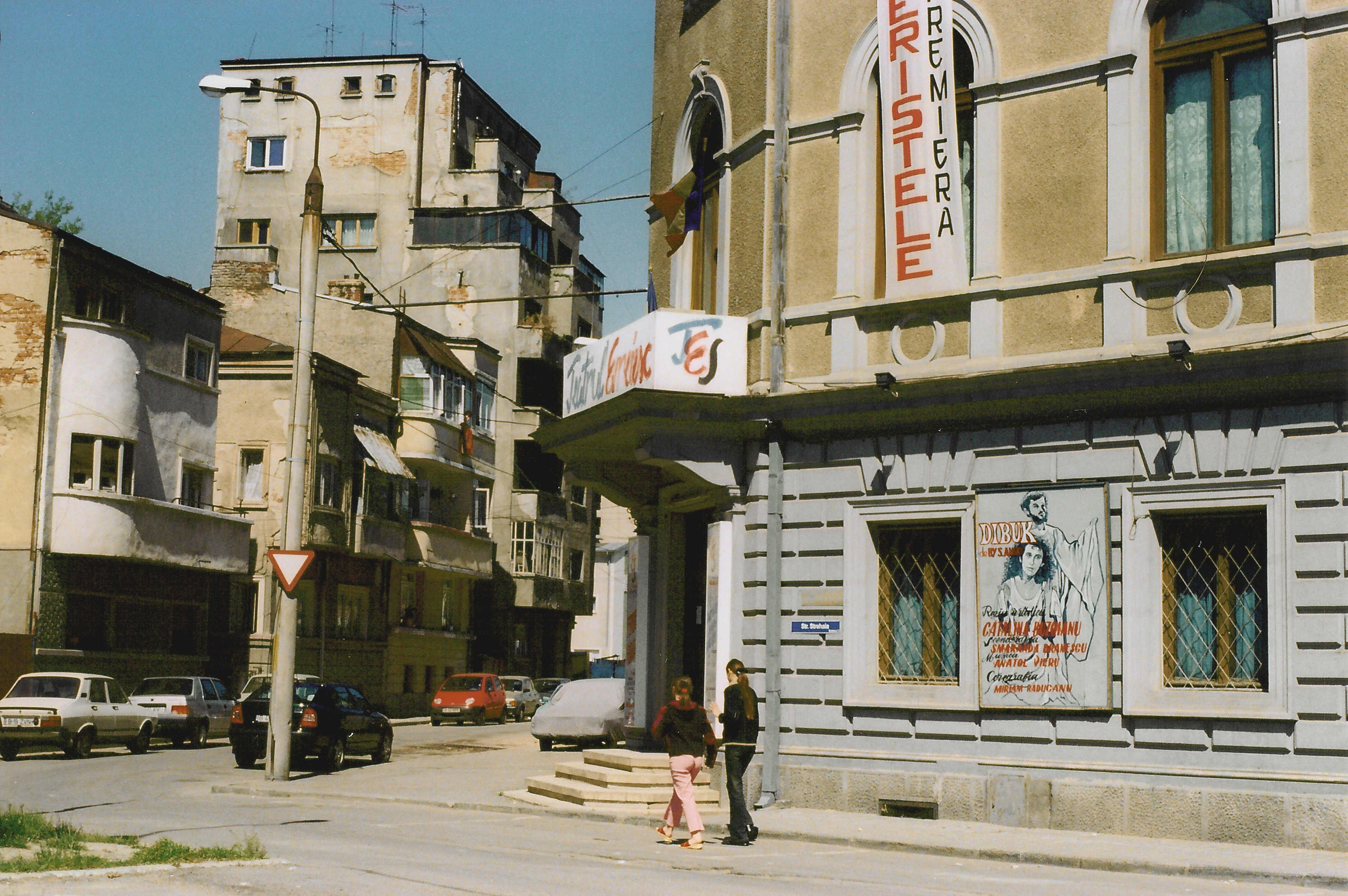
TES (2002). The poster at lower right advertises a production of The Dybbuk by S. Ansky.

After the rise of Communism in Romania, the IKUF theater was nationalized August 1, 1948 as the State Jewish Theater (Teatrul Evreiesc de Stat, TES). A second Romanian State Jewish Theater was established in Iaşi in 1949, but went out of existence in 1964.

TES has operated in the former Baraşeum building almost continually since that time. In 1954–1956 the theater building was rebuilt with a modern stage; the company appeared on a number of other Bucharest stages during that time. In 1955 Franz Auerbach became head of the theater with Iancu Gluck as General Manager and Israil Bercovici as literary secretary. Over the next two decades, these three would doubtless do as much as anyone in the world to keep the flame of Yiddish theater alive. (Auerbach's successor, Harry Eliad, continues to run the theater as of 2005.)

The first production on the new stage in their building (now called, like the company, Teatrul Evreiesc de Stat, but still sometimes referred to as the Baraşeum) was The Diary of Anne Frank, with Samuel Fischler as Otto Frank. For four years (1957–1961), TES also operated a studio theater to train young actors and stage technicians, in which some of the surviving greats of Yiddish theater taught their crafts to a new generation.

The company toured to Israel in 1968, to the United States and Canada in 1972, and to East Berlin in 1977.

The repertoire of TES has included many works with music by their own Haim Schwartzman. They have performed traditional works of the Yiddish theater, and new plays by Ludovic Bruckstein, (or I.L. or Leibush Brukstein, 1920-1988) who wrote between 1948 and 1969 a series of plays both in Yiddish and Romanian. Bruckstein, a survivor of Auschwitz and several other concentration-camps, wrote in 1948 a play entitled "Night-Shift" (Nachtshicht, in Yiddish) describing the revolt of the Auschwitz sonderkommando towards the end of the Second World-War, and the play had a huge success over the years 1949-1958. Subsequently, TES, The Yiddish Theater in Iaşi, and other Theaters in Romania played a series of his plays, (The Grunwald Family in 1952, The Return of Christopher Columbus, 1955, Dor Hamidbar, or The Desert Generation in 1957, An Unfinished Trial in 1961, White Night, 1963, and Meeting on the Mountain in 1969), and Bruckstein became, before his 1972 emigration to Israel, the most important Yiddish playwright of post-war Romania, as mentioned in the Encyclopaedia Judaica, see also YIVO Encyclopedia of Jews in Eastern Europe on Romanian literature.

TES also staged works by Romanian playwrights such as Victor Eftimiu, Victor Ion Popa, Tudor Arghezi, and Lucia Demetrius, and but also a vast array of works from world theater: Bertholt Brecht's Threepenny Opera, Reginald Rose's Twelve Angry Men, Georg Büchner's Woyzeck, Lion Feuchtwanger's Raquel, The Jewess of Toledo, and Friedrich Dürrenmatt's Frank V. More recent additions to their repertoire include works by Israel Horovitz and Ray Cooney, and an adaptation by Dorel Dorian of Saul Bellow's Herzog.

During the Communist era, TES had some interesting exchanges with other Romanian theaters. TES's Mauriciu Sekler directed Brecht's Mother Courage and Her Children at the National Theater; Franz Auerbach directed several plays are the State German Theater in Timișoara. Conversely, non-Jewish actors such as George Trodorescu, Lucu Andreescu, Ştefan Hablinski, and Dan Jitianu played major roles in productions at TES.

Despite significant repression of Jews during some phases of the Communist regime, despite significant emigration of Romanian Jews, and despite the demolition of much of the Văcăreşti neighborhood in anticipation of a never-finished portion of Centrul Civic, the theater continued to operate until the end of the communist era in the Romanian Revolution of 1989. It still continues today (as of 2007) as a public institution, receiving a subsidy from the General Council of the Municipality of Bucharest. Along with the nearby Jewish Museum, it is one of the two most prominent remaining secular Jewish institutions in Romania, continuing what Bercovici called "a tradition of humanist theater".
