= Emil Dorian =

Romanian writer (1893–1956)

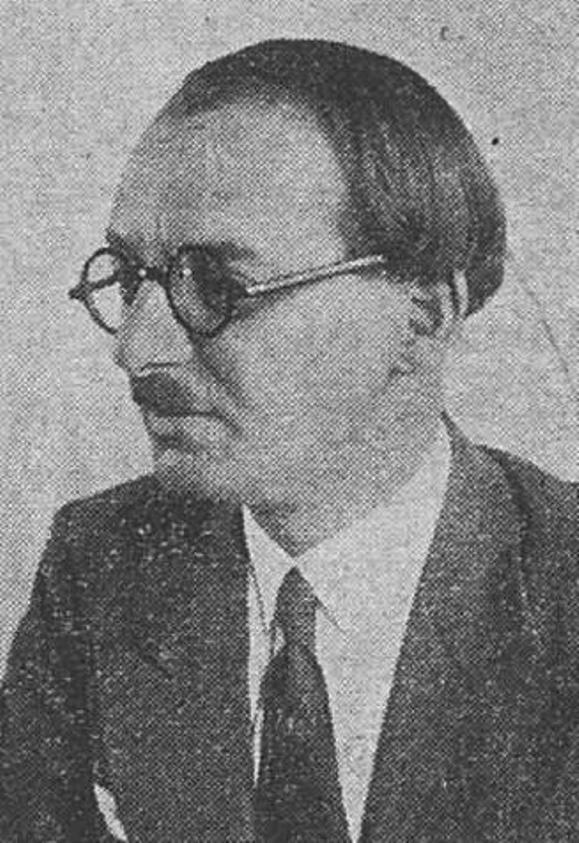
- Born: Emil Lustig; 16 February 1893; Bucharest
- Died: 1956 (aged 62–63)
- Education: University of Bucharest
- Occupations: poet and prose writer, physician

Emil Dorian (born Emil Lustig; 16 February 1893 – 1956) was a Romanian poet and prose writer, as well as a physician.

Born into a Jewish family in Bucharest, his parents were Herman Lustig and his wife Ernestina (née Picher). He attended high school in his native city, followed by the University of Bucharest's medical faculty. Although, as a Jew, he was not yet a Romanian citizen, he was sent to the front in World War I as a physician. After the war, he spent two years in France for medical specialization. He then worked as a doctor in Bucharest, and was also active within the Jewish community, for instance editing the 1946 Raportul general asupra situației comunității. A significant part of his journalistic work is signed with the pen names Dr. Knox, Dr. Otorin, Dr. M. Prunk and Dr. Urzică; publications in which he appeared include Cotidianul, Ziua, Adevărul literar și artistic, Adam, Gândirea, Năzuința, Omul liber, Puntea de fildeș, Sburătorul and Șantier.

His first verses, signed Castor și Pollux, appeared in Noua Revistă Română in 1912. His first book was the poetry collection Cântece pentru Lelioara (1923), followed by În pragul serii (1924). The poems in his Primăvară nouă (1948) and Steagurile inimii (1949), written early in the communist regime, are in socialist realist style; he subsequently wrote one other poetry book, for children Bună dimineața (1953). His novels dealt with social problems drawn from the local Jewish environment: Profeți și paiațe (1931), Vagabonzii (1935) and Otrava (1947). He also wrote books that popularized and vulgarized medicine: Misterele și tehnica sexualității (1932), Adevărurile sexualității (1932), Femei și doctori (1932). He put together a collection of texts on the history of medicine (Din trecutul nostru științific, 1955) and wrote a social observation novel set in the insect world (Memoriile greierului, 1937). Authors he translated include Heinrich Heine, Edmond Haraucourt and Hanns Heinz Ewers. He kept a diary from 1937 onwards, recounting both his struggles as a writer and the increase in far-right activity around him. The World War II-era Ion Antonescu regime officially banned his entire work as "Jewish". He developed an interest in Yiddish poetry in the mid-1930s, translating and collecting over 400 poems; these were ready for publication in 1944, but were not published until 1996.
