= Ronetti Roman =

Imperial Austrian-born Romanian playwright and poet

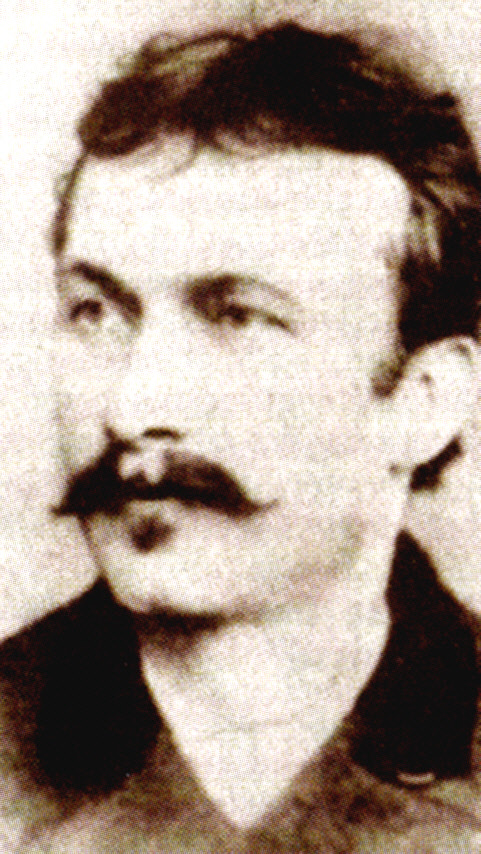
Ronetti Roman around 1870

Ronetti Roman (sometimes given as Moise Ronetti-Roman; born Aron Blumenfeld; 1847–January 7, 1908) was an Austrian-born Romanian playwright and poet. Likely a native of Galicia, he settled permanently in Romania in the mid-1870s. Across the ensuing three decades, he made a name for himself as a polemical journalist, also writing poetry and satire, and concerning himself with the status of the country's Jews. His chief literary contribution was the 1900 play Manasse, which explores the intergenerational conflict between older, devout, tradition-bound Jews and their more secular, modern, assimilated descendants. While very successful with audiences, the play also drew fire from nationalist circles that took to the streets to block its staging on two separate occasions.

== Biography ==
=== Origins and early life ===
The scion of a Hasidic Jewish family, he was born in 1847 in Jezierzany, in the Austrian Empire's Kingdom of Galicia and Lodomeria; today, the place is called Ozeryany and is located in Ukraine's Ternopil Oblast. However, some sources suggest he was born in the Moldavian town of Herța in 1851. A Hebrew tutor in Moldavia in his adolescence, he worked as a teacher in Sadigura, in Austrian Bukovina; and as an accountant in Bacău. He then undertook studies at Hârlău and in Suceava, the latter also in Bukovina. In 1869, he entered the medical faculty of Berlin University, additionally auditing courses in philology and philosophy, but did not graduate. He then travelled to Italy and France.

Settling in Romania for good in 1874, he worked as a German teacher at the V. A. Urechia Institute in the national capital Bucharest and as a German translator at the Foreign Ministry, the latter from 1878. Following his 1883 marriage to the Eleonora Herșcovici, the daughter of a leaseholder, he was a farmer and land manager at Roznov and Davideni in Neamț County, living on an estate in the latter village.

His first published work consisted of Hebrew-language journalism that appeared in Hamagid between 1868 and 1872, where he signed Moise Roman (Romano) and R. Moran. He always avoided using his real surname and kept his first name a secret as well. Determined to become a Romanian writer, he submitted satiric pamphlets and articles on social issues to Revista literară și științifică (1876), Adevărul, Almanahul Dacia, Calendarul Răsăritul, Convorbiri Literare, Curentul nou, Egalitatea, Mântuirea, Opinia, Reforma, România Liberă, Timpul, Anuar pentru israeliți and Flacăra. He was friends with Mihail Kogălniceanu; while writing for the Conservative Party's Timpul, he also became close with Mihai Eminescu and Ion Luca Caragiale, and the three together attended meetings of Titu Maiorescu's Junimea for a time.

His first fictional work was the satire Domnul Kanitverstan, which appeared in 1877; the later Satira jocului was in the same genre. He also wrote verses ("Telegraful", "Rusia"), of which the most polished was Radu, a lengthy romantic poem; and tales (Duhul urgiei). He made a name for himself as a consummate polemicist and pamphleteer. His 1898 essay Două măsuri, which appeared as a series of articles in Adevărul, lamented the erosion of traditional Jewish society and its values, a process he ascribed to modernization; dismissed Zionism as a utopian notion that could not halt Judaism's disappearance; and criticized Romanian government policy toward the Jews. Ronetti Roman's house was vandalized and destroyed during the 1907 Romanian Peasants' revolt. He continued to write for the local Opinia until just before his death of heart failure in Iași early the following year.

=== Manasse ===
==== Initial success and 1906 scandal ====
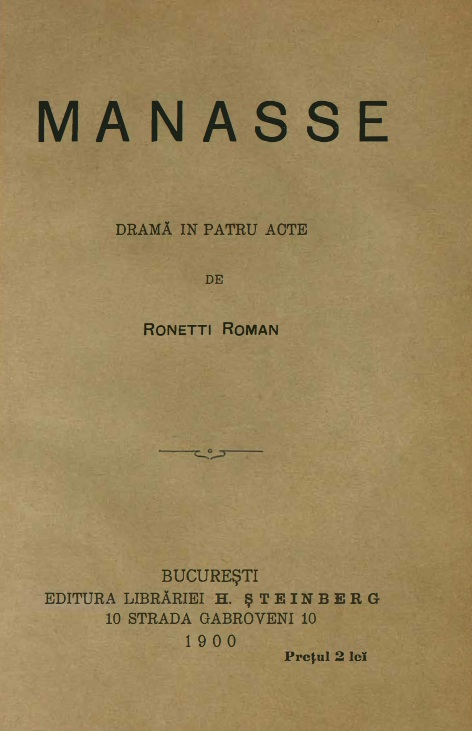
Title page of Manasse (1900)

His play Manasse, published in 1900, expanded upon the ideas he set forth in Două măsuri. It opened to a rousing debut at the Iași National Theatre in March 1901; the Bucharest premiere took place at the Rașca Garden in May 1904. The play's Iași success was repeated at the Bucharest National Theatre in February 1905: Constantin Nottara played Manasse, and the show ran for 26 performances. The play was very popular with audiences, which included members of the Romanian royal family. Its title character is the elderly Manasse Cohen, a conservative defender of Jewish tradition who resides in the Moldavian shtetl of Fălticeni. His son Nissim Cohanovici, a Bucharest merchant, has only tenuous ties to the community. Nissim has two children, Lazăr and Lelia, who respect Manasse's faith but are also modern people who harbor socialist ideas and are integrated into the Romanian intellectual milieu. When Leila decides to marry a Christian lawyer, Manasse suffers greatly and eventually dies.

The play sparked ample controversy: at first, this was located within the Jewish community itself, members of which went to see the premiere early in 1901 at the Zionist Club in Iași. While the Zionists were enthusiastic, other prominent Jews interpreted it as a work promoting assimilation at the expense of Jewish identity. However, the most visible opposition came from the broader Romanian society. Its central monologue on the Christian world's hostility to Jews proved particularly galling to nationalist and antisemitic circles. Alexandru Davila, head of the Bucharest National Theatre, ran into trouble in early 1906, when he decided to bring back the play. That March, Nicolae Iorga stirred up students in the city against the performance of foreign plays at the expense of domestic ones. Initially, their focus was targeted at a series of French plays scheduled to appear, but soon engulfed Manasse; the protesters considered that no authentically Romanian play could be written by a Jew. The show planned for March 12 was banned for being "non-Romanian". The following day, a student revolt spilled into the capital's streets, where battles took place while the political leadership was paralyzed. As a result, the play was shelved and certain intellectuals preferred to keep silent as to its artistic value. In 1909, theatre official Pompiliu Eliade proposed including it in the new season, but dropped the plan when students threatened to take to the streets.

In the years following its publication, critical opinion was divided: Iorga used his Sămănătorul to decry the play, and was joined in the campaign by similarly oriented publications such as Făt-Frumos and its contributor A. C. Cuza. On the other hand, Eugen Lovinescu, writing in 1914, called it "the most powerful drama written in the Romanian language", while an emotional Mihail Dragomirescu asserted that the "Shakespearean drama Manasse will have to serve, alongside Caragiale, as a model for our future dramaturgy". The latter, following in the footsteps of a strongly positive review by Eliade, insisted the play be judged on its aesthetic merits, free from preconceptions. At the time he was writing in 1905, Convorbiri Literare did not tolerate an anti-Sămănătorist line, so he published in Epoca instead. His interventions resulted in a temporary suspension from contributing to Convorbiri Literare, and were eventually cited as a reason for not returning him to the magazine's leadership committee. On a more dramatic note, Ion Scurtu, with whom he was engaged in a Manasse-related polemic in 1908, challenged Dragomirescu to a duel and sent two witnesses; the latter declined to engage.

==== 1913 scandal and legacy ====
Davila, who meanwhile returned to his old post, planned to stage Manasse in October 1913. Iorga, this time assisted by Cuza, again stirred up the students against what they considered an "anti-Romanian" performance. These events occurred against a backdrop of petitions by native-born Jews asking that all Romanian Jews be granted citizenship. Politicians who considered Jews unassimilable opposed the idea, and Interior Minister Take Ionescu remarked that "it would be pure madness on our part to stage Manasse right when the Jewish question is being forced upon us". However, Davila ignored the students (who formed but a vocal minority of the total) and merely delayed the play until later in the month. The day before the scheduled performance, a meeting involving students and professors was held on Queen Elisabeth Boulevard. The latter generally resorted to platitudes: Vasile Pârvan "praised the students' enthusiasm, but suggested the matter does not deserve such importance"; Simion Mehedinți recognized he "did not know the play Manasse and was in no capacity to discuss it, but believed the role of the National Theatre is to safeguard the ancestral religion and creed"; Dragomirescu asserted that "there are spectators who have the right to demand this play, just as students have the right to protest against it". Subsequently, the students left to protest in front of the theatre. Acting upon instructions received from the government, police prefect Dimitrie Moruzzi banned the performance on grounds of "maintaining order".

After this new scandal, Ronetti Roman's widow withdrew permission for the play to appear in state-run theatres. It ran at the Modern Theatre in early November, and at the Sidoli Circus in Iași before the end of the year. Mihail Sadoveanu's 1908 novella Haia Sanis deals with a similar situation from another perspective, but has the same psychological motivation of the younger generation rebelling against older mores. Manasse's themes of integration into Romanian society markedly influenced Jewish writers who came to the fore after World War I. One such, Felix Aderca, described the furore surrounding the play as "the Dreyfus affair of Romanian spirituality". Translated into Yiddish in 1902 by Jacob Sternberg, it performed at the Czernowitz Jewish theatre. Another Yiddish translation played in Bucharest; an English-language version, New Lamps and Old, was staged in St. Louis; and it was also published in Italian. The play was adapted into a film version in 1925, directed by Jean Mihail. The World War II-era Ion Antonescu regime officially banned his entire work as "Jewish".
