= Mihail Dragomirescu =

Romanian aesthetician, literary theorist and critic (1868 - 1942)

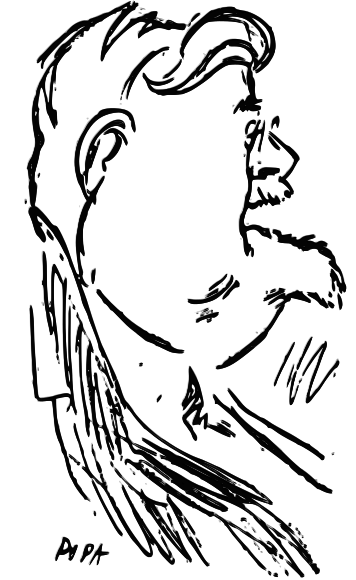
Caricature of Dragomirescu, by Victor Ion Popa (1926)

Mihail Dragomirescu (March 22, 1868 – November 25, 1942) was a Romanian aesthetician, literary theorist and critic.

Born in Plătărești, Călărași County, he completed primary school in his native village in 1881, followed by Bucharest's Gheorghe Lazăr Gymnasium and Saint Sava High School from 1881 to 1889. He then obtained a degree from the University of Bucharest's literature and philosophy faculty; his 1892 thesis dealt with Herbert Spencer. His published debut came that year, with a prose poem in the Junimea-affiliated Convorbiri Literare. A student of Junimea founder Titu Maiorescu's, he took part in the 1890 establishment of the Cultural League for the Unity of All Romanians. He was an editor at Convorbiri Literare from 1895 to 1906. Near the end of his tenure there, Junimea was undergoing a serious crisis marked by numerous differences on principle, exacerbated by the 1905 premiere of Ronetti Roman's play Manasse. The culminating point came when Dragomirescu quit his former colleagues to found a new critical school revolving around Convorbiri magazine, which he established in 1907, and which appeared as Convorbiri Critice from 1908 to 1910. Promoting an aesthetic purism, he adopted a set of Maiorescu's ideas while incorporating his own opinions to develop an original critical worldview. At its core, this held that the essence of art lies in the soul, or more precisely, in a form of its activity, through which reality (art's point of departure) is transformed by a sincere and ordered imagination upon the intervention of an intellectual factor.

He headed Falanga magazine in 1910 and from 1926 to 1929. In 1895, he became a substitute professor at his alma mater, rising to full professor in 1906 and remaining until his retirement in 1938. He founded the Literature Institute in 1922. In 1938, he was elected an honorary member of the Romanian Academy. Dragomirescu's first book was the 1895 Critica "științifică" şi Eminescu. In two works, Știința literaturii (1926; published in French between 1928 and 1930) and Dialoguri filosofice. Integralismul (1929) he set forth his "theory of the masterpiece" and his critical framework, known as "aesthetic integralism". Remaining an intellectual heir to Maiorescu, an adherent of what critic Dan Mănucă labels neo-Junimism, he anticipated structuralism at a time when determinism and historicism were both experiencing a decline in Europe. His first wife was Adelina Poenaru: although her mother and sister were against the union until around 1897, Maiorescu intervened with the Poenaru family, whom he knew well, and the wedding took place in 1898. The couple, temperamental and argumentative, divorced after fifteen years of marriage. Adeline became paralyzed soon after, following a botched anesthesia. His second wife Laura (1893–1981), a native of Craiova, was a translator, particularly of German plays and poems.
