= Bednarek =

Bednarek (Polish pronunciation: [bɛˈdnarɛk]) is a Polish surname. Notable people with the surname include:

== People ==
- Agnieszka Bednarek-Kasza (born 1986), Polish volleyball player
- Elżbieta Bednarek (1945–2021, married name Żebrowska), Polish athlete
- Emil Bednarek (1907–2001), Prisoner-functionary in the Auschwitz concentration camp
- Filip Bednarek (born 1992), Polish footballer
- Jacek Bednarek (born 1964), Polish racewalker
- Jan Bednarek (born 1996), Polish footballer
- Jan Bednarek (politician) (born 1955), Polish politician
- John Michael Bednarek, US army officer
- Kamil Bednarek (born 1991), Polish reggae vocalist and musician of the band named Bednarek
- Kenny Bednarek (born 1998), American athlete who specializes in the 200-meter distance
- Monika Bednarek (born 1977), German-born Australian linguist
- Robert Bednarek (born 1979), Polish footballer manager, former defender for Korona Kielce and others
- Sylwester Bednarek (born 1989), Polish high jumper
- Tomasz Bednarek (actor) (born 1969), Polish actor
- Tomasz Bednarek (born 1981), Polish tennis player

== See also ==
- Bednarik
- Bednarski
- Bednarz
- Bednář, Czech equivalent of the Polish surname
- Bednárec and Bednáreček, villages in the Jindřichův Hradec district of the Czech Republic
- Bednarskie, village in Gorlice county in southern Poland
