= Alexis Macedonski =

Romanian artist, theatrical producer, and activist (1884/1885-1971)

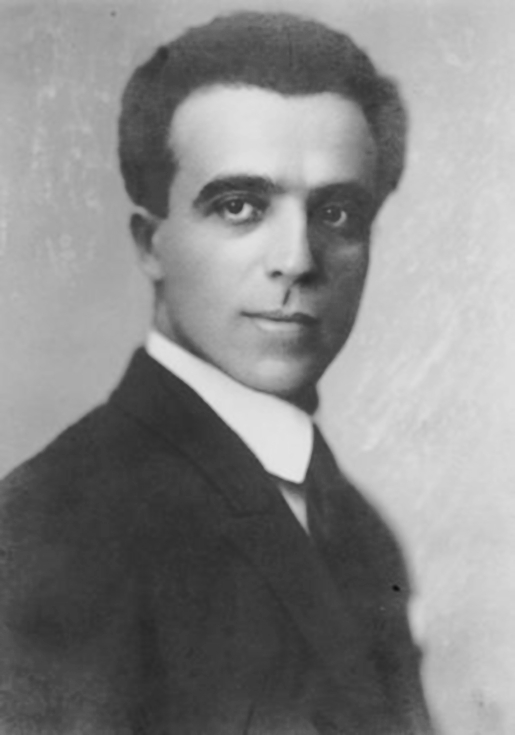
- Macedonski as photographed by Franz Mandy (c. 1910)
- Born: 1884 or 1885; Bucharest, Kingdom of Romania
- Died: 1971 (aged 85–87); Tarragona, Francoist Spain
- Education: Accademia di Belle Arti di Firenze
- Known for: Painting; interior design; stage design; heraldic art
- Movement: Symbolism; Impressionism
- Spouse(s): Francesca "Solaro" Puglia (died c. 1929); Simonne Friant (married c. 1932)
- Children: 3 (including Soare Macedonski)
- Relatives: Alexandru Macedonski (father); Nikita Macedonski (brother); Pavel Macedonski (brother); Mihail Celarianu (brother-in-law)

Alexis Macedonski (first name also rendered as Alexe, last name also Macedonsky or Macedonschi; 1884 or 1885–1971) was a Romanian visual artist, theatrical producer, and political activist, the eldest surviving son of poet-novelist Alexandru Macedonski. The latter enforced his calling for the arts from childhood, with a fragmentary education that was fulfilled in 1909—when Alexis completed the Accademia di Belle Arti in Florence. Infused by Symbolism and Impressionism, his early contribution covered religious art, genre paintings, and portraiture, including depictions of Macedonski-father. Both men lived together in France during the early 1910s; this is also where Alexis' half-Argentine son, Soare Macedonski, was born. The family returned to the Kingdom of Romania in 1913, assisting Alexandru in establishing his influence over the local Symbolist movement. Alexis and his wife Solaro helped decorate the poet's salon in the Bucharest neighborhood of Dorobanți, using a performative lavishness that was meant to clash with their material destitution. The father–son collaboration, which also saw them founding a larger "Idealists' Circle" of artists, was only interrupted during the second half of World War I: while Macedonski Sr preferred to remain in occupied territory and give a measure of support to the Central Powers, Alexis continued to fight alongside the Romanian Land Forces in besieged Western Moldavia, and was recognized by the loyalist authorities as an official war artist.

Upon his second return to Bucharest in late 1918, Alexis stood by his disgraced father. When the latter died in 1920, the painter moved back to Italy, then to France, together with his wife and son. Both he and Soare received recognition for their work; this period was ended abruptly when both Soare and Solaro died. Involved in a legal conflict with his mother, Alexis quit Romania for good, and established a new Macedonski branch upon marrying his French student, Simonne Friant. They lived with their two daughters at Pollença, on the island of Mallorca, until being chased out by the Spanish Civil War. At that stage of his life, Alexis became a supporter of the Nationalist faction, an admirer of Italian fascism, and an affiliate of the Crusade of Romanianism. He returned to Mallorca after it had been secured by Francoist Spain, living there throughout World War II, and down to 1959. Although his second daughter Florita became successful early on, as both a painter and poet, the Macedonskis were destitute, and eventually had to move to the mainland. Alexis was cut off from Romania, which was taken over by a communist regime, though he maintained friendly contacts with some in the anti-communist Romanian diaspora, including the poet-diplomat Aron Cotruș. The artist died in Tarragona in 1971.

== Early life and first departure ==
The painter was born into a clan of Balkan origin. Their exact ethnic background is disputed, with most theories converging on their identification as Serbs; conflicting hypotheses (described by literary historian Adrian Marino as fringe) see them as Bulgarian or Aromanian. Though spuriously claiming descent from Polish nobility, their first attested patriarch was the early-19th-century insurgent Dimitrie Macedonski, who had settled in Wallachia upon crossing the Danube. Alexis once presented himself as entitled to the Biberstein coat of arms. He later accepted his southern lineage, placing his ultimate origins in Macedonia, but also claimed that the family had branches in much of Europe. Alexis' paternal grandfather, also named Alexandru, was a general in the military forces of the United Principalities; his wife, Maria Fisența, had been adopted into Wallachian boyardom, and owned estates in Oltenia.

Alexis was the eldest of five surviving children from Alexandru Jr's marriage to Ana Rallet Slătineanu, who was from an "extremely wealthy" family (the poet's oldest son, George, had died in infancy). Through Ana, the painter was the nephew of jurists George and Manolache Slătineanu. He himself believed that, on this Wallachian side, he descended from the ancient House of Basarab, and, "through women", from the Cantemirești. Affectionately nicknamed "Puiu" ("the Cub"), Alexis was born in Bucharest in 1884 or 1885. This was some three years ahead of his brother Nikita (1888–1933). Disgraced nationally for diatribes against the ailing Mihai Eminescu, Macedonski Sr had resettled in France during the early 1880s, but had returned to Bucharest in January 1885. Upon announcing Alexis' birth in his Literatorul journal, Alexandru also placed a wager that his first-born would grow up into a "famous painter". Both boys received training in visual arts, though Nikita was primarily known for inventing and trying to market a synthetic version of nacre. A much younger brother, Pavel (1893–1946), was an actor; he also tried his hand at writing poetry and novels, but received bad reviews for such work. Their sister, Ana "Nina" (1897–1958), was not involved in literary life other than as the wife of poet Mihail Celarianu (having previously been the fiancee of another author, Oreste Georgescu). Finally, the youngest Macedonski son, Constantin-Hyacint or "Dinu" (1898–1956), also trained and worked as an actor.

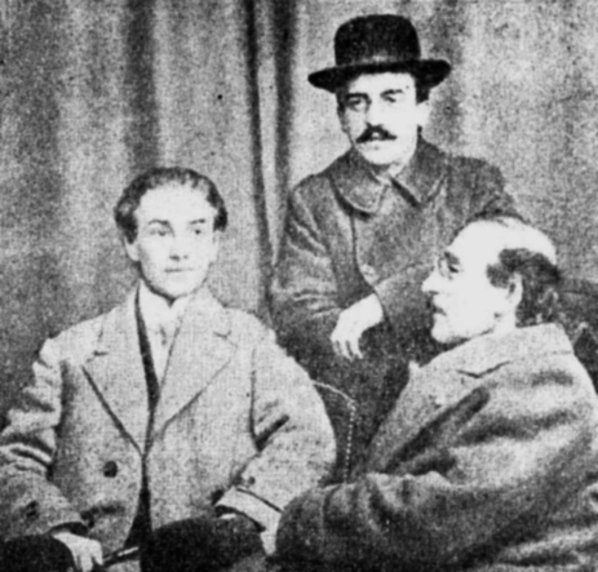
Alexis (standing) with Alexandru Macedonski and his sister's fiance, Oreste Georgescu

As once noted by Alexandru Macedonski's friend Eugeniu Sperantia, Alexis both resembled and imitated his father, but "without knowing how to cover up in that same tact the measure of his pride", and without achieving in art what his father had accomplished in poetry. He is believed to have been enlisted by Alexandru at the Bucharest School of Fine Arts, but without bothering to attend classes. In March 1903, he joined his father's initiative committee, which gathered funds for a bust of the deceased Symbolist Iuliu Cezar Săvescu. The young man probably spent the years 1904–1907 in Paris. Art historian Vasile Georgescu Paleolog reports that he was enlisted at, or merely attending, the Beaux-Arts de Paris, in the company of other Romanians—including Constantin Brâncuși, Theodor Pallady, Eustațiu Stoenescu, Camil Ressu, and Constantin Ganesco. In 1905, he had moved to Italy: he was lodging in Florence, accompanied for a while by his father and by the musicologist Jules Combarieu. He then also befriended the Swiss artist Alexandre Cingria, who was in correspondence with Macedonski Sr. To 1909, he also attended the Accademia di Belle Arti. A chronicle in La Patria newspaper reserved praise for his religious art (including a "grandiose and deeply saddening" Crucifixion of Christ) and his genre painting (such as his depiction of Florentine prostitutes).

A disciple of Alexandru Macedonski, the poet Donar Munteanu, believes that the son and father were together on the extended trip to Italy: after having two of his paintings purchased by Anastase Simu, Alexis had also received a scholarship from the Romanian Ministry of Education; he then "grew accustomed" to the Italian life. During this interval, he provided the cover illustration his father's Symbolist erotic novel, Thalassa, on its French edition of 1906. This drawing impressed one of Thalassa's French reviewers, Jules Bois, since "Alexis Macedonski has shed light [...] on Alexandru Macedonski's fickle, dusky pages." Sperantia suggests that, while not great, the illustration also attested to Alexis' skill and imagination; writer and jurist Alexandru Bilciurescu, who was acquainted with Macedonski Sr, sees it as fitting for the narrative. At around that time, Alexis was romantically pursuing the female artist Lucia Dem. Bălăcescu, who did not reciprocate his affection. She left scathing (and, as noted by Bilciurescu, rather unfair) memoirs of their encounters, questioning Alexis' competence as a painter.

In 1910–1912, the young artist was again living in Paris. He rented a small studio at Rue Bonaparte No 19, where he also played host to his aging father. He had married in Florence the Argentine Francesca Puglia, known professionally as "Solaro". Their son was born in Paris, and given the "extravagant name" of Soare (Romanian for "Sun"), which seemingly agreed with his mother's Spanish pseudonym. A guest at the Salon d'Automne, Alexis collected praise from various prestigious critics, including Paul Fort and Jean Richepin. In early 1911, the Société des Artistes Indépendants exhibited his Bible-themed canvass, "Paradise Lost", which was 3 meters tall and 3.6 meters wide, earning praise for his "extraordinary technique" from the French esotericist Joséphin Péladan. The exhibit also included three other of his works, including an apotheosis of his father. Its meaning was first revealed for the public by the Decadent poet Dumitru Karnabatt, in an article for Seara (which reserved high praise for Alexis' skill). His more conventional oil portrait of Macedonski Sr was reproduced on the cover of a 1912 poetry collection, Flori sacre. Sperantia notes that, while "idealized", the work had a "perfect resemblance" with the model.

== Romanian career ==
Both Macedonskis ultimately returned in 1913, settling in Bucharest's Dorobanți ward. Alexis was then featured with his "Paradise Lost" at the Bucharest Official Salon in June—the work was panned by Flacăra magazine as "feeble", "lacking all seriousness", but was well-liked by Simu, who purchased it for his own permanent exhibit. Alexis was involved in decorating his father's new extravagant dwelling, which included a throne that he himself painted, inside a red velvet-draped hall. According to cultural sociologist Zigu Ornea, Alexis not only built up the whole interior (by enacting Alexandru's "scrupulous suggestions"), but also produced the synthetic gems that were handed out to young disciples during the salon sessions. The latter creations were of very poor quality, and "most of the time, would begin to crumble as soon as they were placed inside one's pocket." According to one anecdote, a young poet complained that he had received one such artifact as a prize, only to be informed by Alexandru that he could always pick out another gemstone from the crate. According to a later account by the art collector Pompiliu Macovei, Alexis' work on supporting his father's "Imperial Byzantine airs" also included samples of heraldic art. Upon hearing Horia Furtună recite from his poetry at the salon, Alexis was inspired to paint an Impressionistic nightscape. According to Sperantia, its "thick sadness" has little to do with Furtună's tone, and more in common with George Bacovia's funereal verse, possibly showing "the early signs of a secret depression occurring deep in the painter's heart."

The two Macedonskis were sometimes joined in their creative project by Solaro; she helped them sculpt clay figurines and other pieces of furniture. Munteanu first met Alexis and his wife, as well as "their blond child, Soare" in 1914, when they picnicked together in downtown Bucharest. He believes that Alexis was less gifted a painter than Solaro, who was also a "superb brunette". From about 1913 (when he was aged fifteen), their son had also taken up painting, primarily in watercolor, and was seen by critics such as Georges Charensol and Louis Vauxcelles as highly promising—on par with Pierre Laprade and Picasso's Blue Period. Another member of the Macedonskian circle, Adrian Maniu, calls him a "wonder child" of Romanian art.

Soare Macedonski's self-portrait

By 1915, Alexandru was extending his Symbolist influence directly into the field of visual arts, through an "Idealists' Circle", formed in 1915. Adherents included Alexis and Solaro, alongside Elena Alexandrina Bednarik, Ignat Bednarik, Leon Biju, Horia Boambă, Constantin Iotzu, Alexandru Poitevin-Skeletti, Elena Popea, and Alexandru Severin. Alexis and Oreste Georgescu also debuted as theatrical producers, with a small company housed at Natura Coffeehouse (formerly a Slătineanu residence). It was primarily dedicated to preserving the tradition of Nativity plays within the context of Romanian folklore. Solaro and Alexis exhibited together at the Independent Artists' Salon in January 1916. This event was covered by Barbu Brănișteanu of Adevărul daily, who viewed Alexis as the most accomplished painter of the independent group, admiring his "vigorous conception". He also remarked that Solaro was highly gifted, especially in her drawings. Another chronicle in the same newspaper expressed similar admiration for both artists, noting that Solaro's drawings were of a near-pictorial quality.

Shortly after, during the mid-and-late stages of World War I, father and son were separated. Alexandru chose to remain in place after the 1916 occupation of southern Romania (making a public announcement of this in September 1917), and gave his endorsement to the Central Powers. Alexis, who had expressed support for the Entente countries even during Romania's neutrality period, was instantly drafted and went to the front. He escaped with the bulk of the army into Western Moldavia, and, in June 1917, became a commissioned war artist, with the rank of Lieutenant and a permit allowing him to visit anywhere on the front. Agents of the Siguranța interrogated him about his acquaintance Toma Oprea, who was putting out a satirical magazine, Deșteptarea, which was viewed by the authorities as defeatist. Macedonski assured the policemen that Oprea was a "tranquil lad". That September, his paintings of battles were exhibited by the Romanian General Staff at the provisional capital of Iași, drawing praise from the art chroniclers at Neamul Românesc. He took part in other such shows during early 1918, earning respect for his Impressionist study, În patrulare ("On Patrol"). In April, he and Ressu helped establish there the Arta Română Society, whose other activists were Traian Cornescu, Ștefan Dimitrescu, Oscar Han, Cornel Medrea, Ion Theodorescu-Sion, and Nicolae Tonitza.

== Between Paris and Mallorca ==
In May 1918, the authorities in Iași agreed to sign a separate peace with the Central Powers, inaugurating an uncertain period which ended in September, during the Entente's progress along the Danube. Alexis could return to Bucharest in October, announcing that he was preparing a retrospective show of his Moldavian paintings. The November Armistice then brought a settling of scores between the cultural-political establishment and Macedonski Sr. Again disgraced, and also impoverished, he died in Bucharest in November 1920. His final will urged his children to leave Romania, "the country of my suffering", and "fashion themselves a new homeland." Alexis was at his deathbed, only running out to also fetch his father's young friend, the philosopher Tudor Vianu. During the funeral, he allegedly created an "embarrassing scene", interrupting an oration by Octavian Goga to complain about his own destitution.

As attested by one of his letters to Simu, in May 1921 Alexis was at Albano Laziale, in the Italian Province of Rome. He was seeking financial support for a Romanian art show in Venice, as well as for his own family's welfare—complaining that he was "materially disarmed" (dezarmat materialicește). In 1922–1924, he was living with his wife in France. Macedonski's February 1922 show at Reitlinger Gallery was introduced by Gabriel Mourey, who praised him as a decorative artist, recommending him to do large-scale paintings. This verdict was questioned by art columnist Henri Lognon, who contrarily believed that his best skill was as a portraitist—including in his painting of Henri Massis' wife. Le Petit Parisien noted his "clear palette, non-bluffing technique, and great sensitivity", but suggested that he still had much to learn in his craft. Marie, the Queen of Romania, began taking an interest in his art, purchasing and distributing it around various museums of his native land. Macedonski experienced additional success as a set designer on the film La légende de sœur Beatrix, and had one of his paintings purchased by the French state; he was based for a while in Collioure, completing decorative panels for a building in Lesparrou. He attended a commemorative ceremony for the Occitan poet Albert Saisset. His speech, published in Le Coq Catalan newspaper, described the supposed cultural similarities between Romania and the Provence.

In a November 1921 letter, Ana Rallet-Macedonski discussed her material want, reporting that: "My sons help me as much as they can, but only when something exceptional is needed, [since] they themselves have a hard time hanging on". Nikita Macedonski was at the time involved in handling the letters-to-the-editor column for Universul Literar. In December 1924, Ana was suing Alexis, "last known domicile in Paris, currently unknown", over the family inheritance. In April 1926, Alexis was again in Paris, with his wife and son. He wrote to Simu about the good reviews that Soare had received in magazines such as L'Art Vivant. The 18-years-old boy died in October 1928, following an undisclosed accident on the French Riviera, and was buried alongside his paternal grandfather at Bellu cemetery. The ceremony was attended by a group of young authors, including Alexis' brother-in-law Celarianu and Vasile Voiculescu. In early 1929, Alexis curated his son's postuhumos exhibit at the Romanian Atheneum. In the catalog, he described Soare's life as one of "strong, exuberant, healthy heroism", asking art lovers not to remember him as an "accursed" artist. The bereaved parents donated Soare's entire work to the Romanian state—their pledge was also signed by painters such as Pallady, Tonitza and Dimitrescu, all of whom vouched for Soare's value as an artist. In a parallel article for Viața Romînească, Tonitza described the critics' "revolting indifference" toward the art show, suggesting that it stood as a final offense against Soare. Solaro probably died at around the same time, leaving Alexis a widower.

In May 1931, brothers Alexis and Dinu, alongside dancer Paule Sibille, were producing theatrical shows at their own company, "Zig-Zag"—located at Schitu Măgureanu Boulevard No 6, opposite the Cișmigiu Gardens. The Macedonskis were living in near-squalor. Nikita still made efforts to patent his nacre invention, as a way of improving their situation. He only managed to do so in 1932, some months before he died. By then, Alexis had married Simonne (also known as Sandra or Florena) Friant of Orléans, who had been his art student; she was the daughter of a French military surgeon, General Hubert Friant, and a relative of painter Émile Friant. She gave birth to Alexis' first daughter, Carmen, at some point before June 1932.

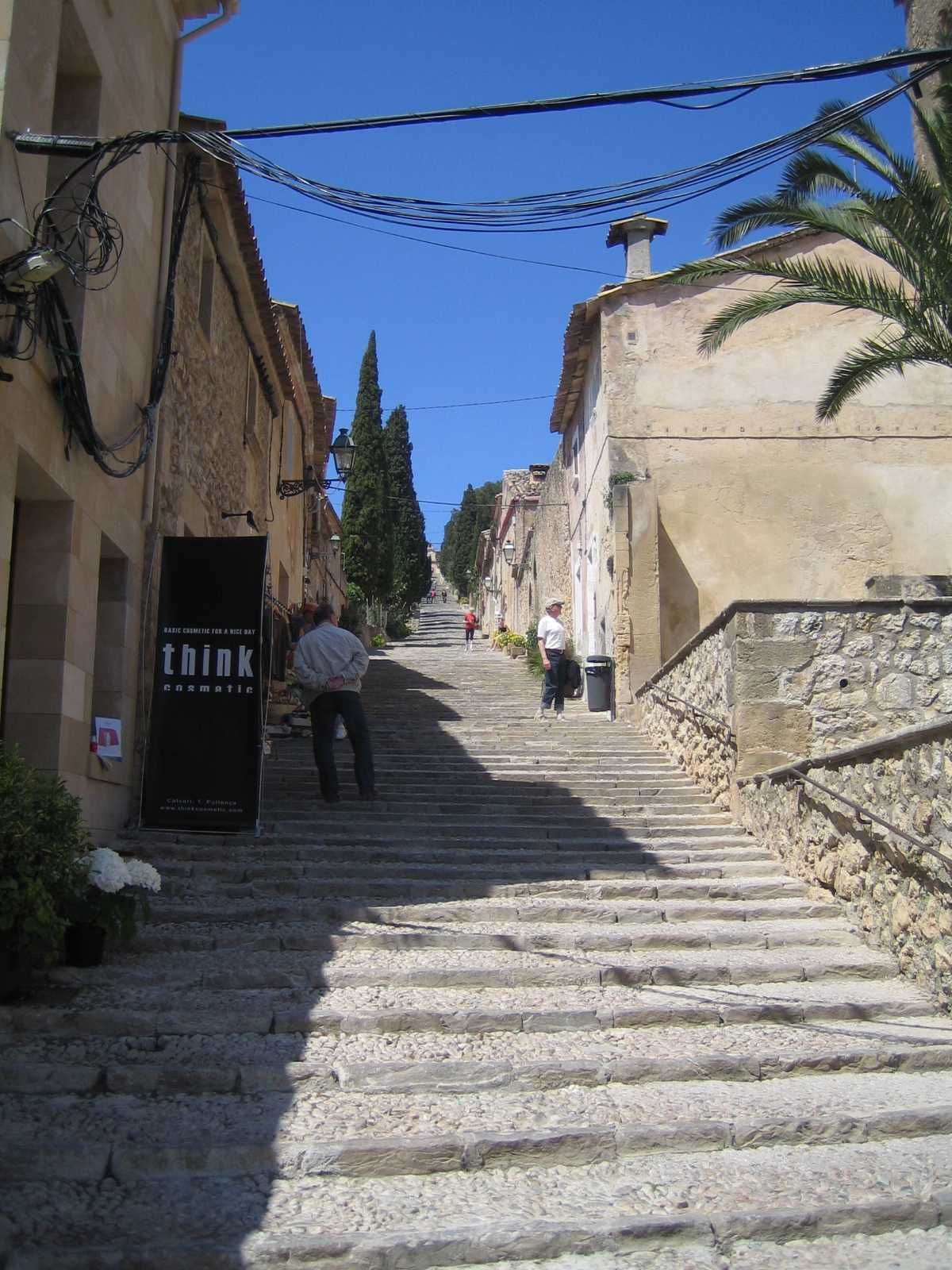
View of Pollença's Calle Calvario (now El Calvari)

In January 1934, after the Romanian Premier Ion G. Duca had been assassinated by the fascist Iron Guard (through the Nicadori), Alexis sent from Paris a telegram condemning the movement and its "most demented attack." Munteanu, who continued to visit Ana Rallet, asked her about her son's disappearance from public life, learning that he had emigrated, "this time for good", but also that he had married a second time and was "doing well." He faintly recalls being told that his new home was in the Azores. Bilciurescu contrarily reports that he had moved to Spain "to achieve his financial independence". Macedonski was in fact living a "quasi-primitive life" in Pollença, on the island of Mallorca, which he had first visited in 1934. His second daughter, Flora, commonly known as "Florita", was born on 17 February 1936 at the Macedonski home on Pollença's Calle Calvario, No 22, and raised Catholic. Her father always spelled her name with an added diacritic, as "Florița" (the Romanian for "little flower").

During the early stages of the Spanish Civil War, Mallorca pledged itself to the Nationalist rebels. By his own account, Macedonski was driven out of the island during a 1936 assault by the Spanish Republican Air Force (or what he called "bombings by the Red planes"); he then fled to Fascist Italy, where he voiced his hope that the Nationalists would destroy the Republican "barbarians". He now also associated with a breakaway faction of the Iron Guard, called "Crusade of Romanianism", and had various articles published in the Crusade's eponymous journal, put out in Bucharest; as argued by literary scholar Rodica Pandele, this collaboration was "evidently sentimental", rather than ideological. In a November 1936 interview with Il Popolo d'Italia's Gian Maria Cominetti, Macedonski defined himself as an actual member of the Crusade. He described it as "an anti-communist organization for national revival", and highlighted its similarities with Italian fascism.

== In Francoist Spain ==
Macedonski was again living in Pollença with his new wife after the Francoist regime had consolidated itself. In January 1940, an "Alexis Macedonski Exhibit" was announced at the Galerías Costa in Palma de Mallorca; during early 1942, it reopened at the Galerías Augusta in Barcelona. During the peak of World War II, while Spain remained neutral, Romania, governed by Ion Antonescu, joined the Axis powers. Macedonski's brother Pavel had continued in Bucharest, and during the war years was leading a "Romanian Literary Salon", with guests such as Eraclie Sterian. Alexis himself remained in exile, but preserved some links with his homeland throughout the Antonescu years. In mid-1943, he exhibited his work with Los Amigos de Arte in Madrid. The event was organized by a Spanish–Romanian Association, and (as announced in the Romanian paper Viața) was "positively received by the Spanish art critics." As noted by the Romanian press attache Aron Cotruș, in July 1944 Macedonski had fallen back into destitution and "horrific want". Cotruș asked his superiors to intervene discreetly by commissioning works from the painter; just days after, an anti-fascist coup in Bucharest toppled Antonescu, leaving Cotruș himself stranded in Madrid, and struggling to survive.

Macedonski was still active after the 1944 setbacks, and tutored the younger Catalan artist Esteva Suñol Genís, who emigrated to Argentina in 1949. His daughter had her debut art show after her First Communion, in 1945. Alexis was interviewed by the Balearic Islands newspaper of FET y de las JONS in January 1947—by which time he himself had returned from Latin America, was holding new exhibits, and was also lecturing at the Escuela Lulistica Mayoricense in Palma. The reporter assessed that, beyond his "grandiloquent gesturing", Macedonski was timid, and overall a "great intimist"; when not painting, he spent his time reading Don Quixote and the poetry of Saint Francis. In October 1950, he exhibited with the Circulo de Bellas Artes society at Galerías Costa. The exhibit was reviewed by the Correo de Mallorca, which reported that he was still an "excellent painter, towering over the various mediums and schools".

In November 1951, Circulo de Bellas Artes honored Florita for her own work in both visual arts and poetry. The party was attended by numerous expatriates, including William Haygood of Madrid's Casa Americana, as well as by Joan Alcover's son Pau (who gave readings from his father's poetry). That year, she won a First Prize in the Sacred Art Competition, and, for the next seven years, she had intermittent shows at the Galerías Quint in Palma—also publishing her debut book of verse in 1952. Though her work had been featured at Thyssen's "Romanian Contemporary Art Exhibit" in May 1953, the family was now largely cut off from Romania, which had become a communist state inside the Eastern Bloc, but maintained links with the anti-communist Romanian diaspora. By 1954, Alexis was engaged in a sporadic correspondence (only published in 2013) with another Romanian exile, Mircea Popescu, who was working for the Italian state radio. He also kept up with the Carpați circle, formed in Madrid by Cotruș and Vasile Posteucă, and once hosted art historian Alexandru Busuioceanu in Mallorca.

In 1958, the aging painter was working at the Catholic Church in Felanitx, producing the panel Adoración de la Asunta ("Adoration of the Assumption"). He had been forced to move out of Pollença to a new home in Palma. He was then evicted to a "country home" in Bunyola when he could not longer afford his "measly rent", and informed Cotruș that he had lost all interest in Mallorca. His main income derived from Florita's art shows in Barcelona, but only amounted to some 6,000 pesetas. He and all his family summered with their Friant relatives in France, where Alexis was reunited with old friends such as Paul Fort and Henri Massis. The Macedonskis then moved to the Spanish mainland, in Barcelona, where Florita was taking a formal training in painting; Carmen had married there, giving birth to Alexis' two grandsons. In the 1960s, Alexis and all other members of his household were recorded as residents of Madrid. He found the city to have lost its panache, largely because Cotruș was undergoing medical treatment in California (he would eventually die there in November 1961). In his letters of the time, Alexis confessed his anti-Americanism, urging his friend to leave for Mexico, or for any other country where people are "more emotional". He also mentioned his own belief in a society of Übermensch (picked up from Gabriele D'Annunzio's Maidens of the Rocks), and claimed that one's destiny could be improved through "white magic".

Acclaimed for her poetic style, including by the Marquess of Lozoya, Florita did decorative work on numerous new churches, including at El Sabinar in the Province of Zaragoza. Lozoya promised to steer her professional path, but only on condition that she would not marry. She ultimately found a husband, and left the family home in January 1967. Alexis Macedonski died in 1971 at Tarragona, in circumstances that Bilciurescu describes as "mysterious". The communist regime at home was by then allowing explorations of the Macedonskis' role in Romanian culture. In a memoir published in October 1971, Zaharia Stancu mentioned his own meetings with the entire generation of that family, "except for Alexis Macedonski, the son that lost himself somewhere in the world, and for his own son, Soare Macedonski"; he also recalled having once attended and being "enchanted" by Soare's posthumous exhibit. Alexis' death came just as the Romanian scholar Adrian Marino was trying to reach him to discuss his father. Marino was instead acquainted with Florita, and, in his book of travels, described her as a Romanian "Rouault". Over the following years, the Museum of Romanian Literature reconstructed Alexis and Solaro's works from the Dorobanți period, putting them on public display by 1978. Florita died in Barcelona on 16 March 2014.
