= Robertson Channel =

Robertson Channel (66°19′S 110°29′E) is a body of water separating Mitchell Peninsula from Pidgeon Island and Warrington Island, in the Windmill Islands. It was first mapped from air photos taken by U.S. Navy Operation Highjump and Operation Windmill in 1947 and 1948, and was named by the Advisory Committee on Antarctic Names (US-ACAN) for Richard A. Robertson, glaciologist and member of the Wilkes Station party of 1958.
