= Bednarik =

Bednarik is a surname. Notable people with the surname include:

- Chuck Bednarik (1925–2015), American football player
- Daniel Bednárik (born 1994), Slovak footballer
- Elena Alexandrina Bednarik (1883–1939), Romanian painter
- Ignat Bednarik (1882–1963), Romanian painter
- Ivan Bednárik (born 1975), Czech politician
- Miloslav Bednařík (1965–1989), Czechoslovak sport shooter
- Nina Bednarik (born 1982), Slovenian skier
- Teréz Bednarik (born 1957), Hungarian rower

== See also ==
- Chuck Bednarik Award, an award presented annually to the defensive collegiate football player adjudged by the Maxwell Football Club
