= Bednarz =

Bednarz is a Polish surname. It may refer to:

- Andrzej Bednarz (born 1980), Polish football player
- Jacek Bednarz (born 1967), Polish football player
- Frédéric Bednarz, Canadian violinist
- Klaus Bednarz (1942–2015), German journalist
- Stefan Bednarz, The Scar (1976 film) character

== See also ==
- Bednarz Cove in Antarctica
