= Griffith Island (disambiguation) =

Griffith Island is a small Antarctic island. It may also refer to:

- Griffith Island (Nunavut), in the Canadian Arctic
- Griffith Island (Georgian Bay), an island in Georgian Bay, Ontario, Canada

== See also ==
- Griffiths Island, a small island in Port Fairy, Victoria, Australia
