= Harrigan Hill =

Hill in Antarctica

Harrigan Hill (66°19′S 110°29′E) is a rocky hill in the northwest part of Mitchell Peninsula, just east of Pidgeon Island of the Windmill Islands, Antarctica. It was first mapped from air photos taken by U.S. Navy Operation Highjump, 1946–47, and was named by the Advisory Committee on Antarctic Names for Edward C. Harrigan, a meteorologist at Wilkes Station in 1961.
