= Adrian Moescu =

Romanian footballer

Personal information
- Full name: Adrian Costi Marian Moescu
- Date of birth: 31 May 2001 (age 25)
- Place of birth: Orșova, Romania
- Height: 1.87 m (6 ft 2 in)
- Position: Defender

Team information
- Current team: Viitorul Curița

Youth career
- Sport Kids Turnu Severin
- Luceafărul Turnu Severin
- –2019: AS Pro Junior Craiova

Senior career*
Years	Team	Apps	(Gls)
2019–2023	Botoșani	3	(0)
2021–2022	→ Dante Botoșani (loan)	20	(0)
2023	→ Ceahlăul Piatra Neamț (loan)	4	(0)
2023– 2024	Foresta Suceava	0	(0)
2024-	Viitorul Curița	0	(0)
- * Club domestic league appearances and goals as of 09:20, 6 October 2023 (UTC)

Adrian Costi Marian Moescu (born 31 May 2001), commonly known as Adrian Moescu, is a Romanian professional footballer who plays as a defender for Liga III side Viitorul Curița.

== Honours ==
=== Dante Botoșani ===
- Liga III: 2021–22
