= Robinson Ridge =

Rocky coastal peninsula in Antarctica

Robinson Ridge (66°22′S 110°36′E) is a rocky coastal peninsula in Antarctica between Sparkes Bay and Penney Bay, at the east side of the Windmill Islands. It was first mapped from air photos taken by the U.S. Navy Operation Highjump in February 1947. It was named by the Advisory Committee on Antarctic Names (US-ACAN) for Lieutenant Commander Frederick G. Robinson, U.S. Navy, aerological officer with U.S. Navy Operation Windmill which established astronomical control stations in the area in January 1948.
