= Placekicker =

Player position in American and Canadian football

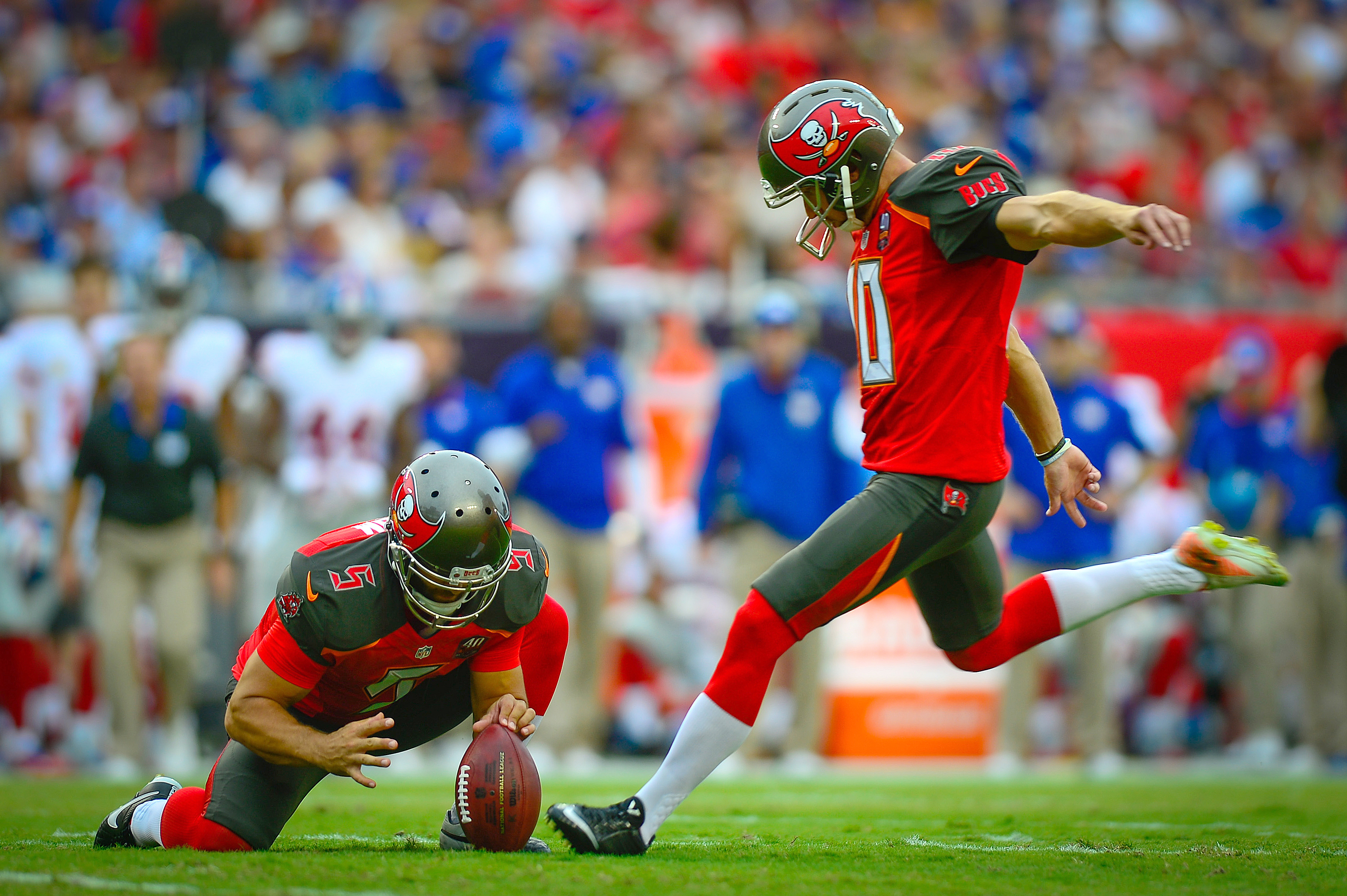
Connor Barth, a placekicker for the Tampa Bay Buccaneers, kicks a field goal

In gridiron football, the placekicker (PK), more commonly known as kicker (K), is the player responsible for attempts at scoring field goals and extra points. In most cases, the placekicker also serves as the team's kickoff specialist. The term derives from the attempted scorer kicking the ball "from placement" of a teammate holding the ball rather than by individually drop-kicking the ball through the goal posts.

== Specialized role ==
The kicker initially was not a specialized role. Before the 1934 standardization of the prolate spheroid shape of the ball, drop kicking was the prevalent method of kicking field goals and conversions, but even after its replacement by place kicking, until the 1960s the kicker almost always doubled at another position on the roster. George Blanda, Lou Groza, Frank Gifford and Paul Hornung are prominent examples of players who were stars at other positions as well as being known for their kicking abilities. When the one-platoon system was abolished in the 1940s, the era of "two-way" players gave way to increased specialization, teams would employ a specialist at the punter or kicker position. Ben Agajanian, who started his professional career in 1945, was the first confirmed place-kicking specialist in the NFL, kicking for ten teams. However, there is some evidence that Ken Strong and Phil Martinovich, both in 1939, and Mose Kelsch, in 1933 and 1934, may have preceded Agajanian as players who spent their seasons doing nothing but kicking.

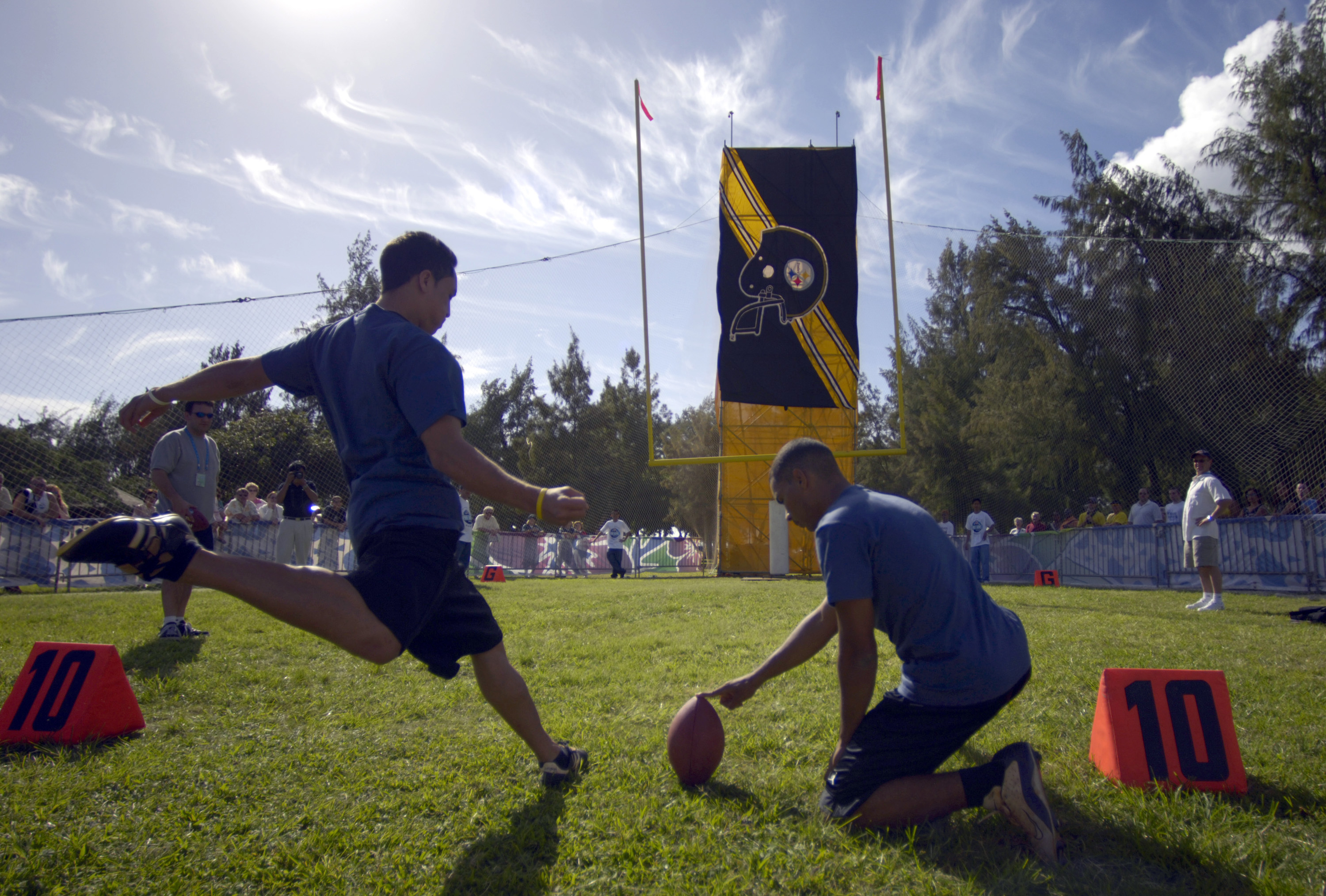
An amateur placekicker attempts to kick a field goal.

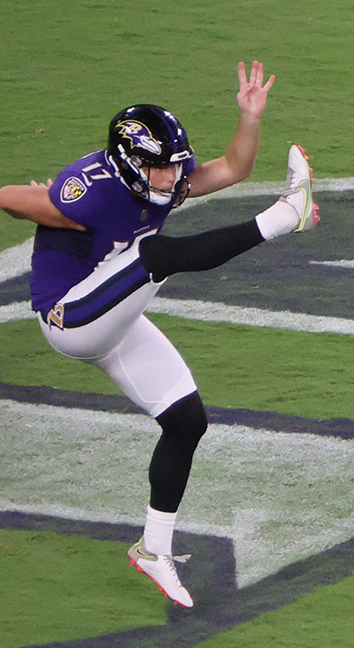
Cameron Dicker, the most accurate placekicker in NFL history.

Because of the difference in techniques needed, to avoid leg fatigue, and to reduce the risk of injury, on the professional level most teams employ separate players to handle the jobs. The placekicker usually will only punt when the punter is injured, and vice versa (one player often handles both jobs in the Canadian Football League, which has smaller active rosters than in the NFL). A professional team will occasionally even have a kickoff specialist who handles only the kickoffs and serves as a backup to the kicker who handles field goals and extra points. This is typically done to further protect a premier point-scoring kicker from injury or if he, while accurate, does not have sufficient distance on kickoffs.

Amateur teams (e.g., college or high school) often do not differentiate between placekickers and punters, have different players assume different placekicking duties (for example, one person handles kicking off, another kicks long field goals, and another kicks from shorter distances), or have regular position players handle kicking duties. The last option is quite common on high school teams, when the best athletes are often the best kickers. Before the modern era of pro football, this was also the case for professional teams, particularly when most placekicks were still made in the "straight on" style outlined below.

Although kickers are protected from direct physical contact on field goal attempts, this is not generally true on kickoffs, and a kicker can see significant contact during a kick return. Kicker Björn Nittmo notably suffered severe brain damage from a hit he sustained on a kickoff in 1997.

Still, due to their lack of plays in games and lack of contact compared to other positions, the top kickers in the NFL have often had extremely long careers, far beyond that of a typical NFL player. Of the eight players in NFL history who have played beyond the age of 45, six of them are kickers: Morten Andersen, Gary Anderson, John Carney, Ben Agajanian, Adam Vinatieri, and George Blanda (Blanda was the oldest player in NFL history, playing until the age of 48).

=== Out of position players playing kickers ===
In a rare few cases players out of position that has kicked field goals or kickoffs. Usually from injury from their kicker. A team would try out player who capable of kicking a football. Like example when Chiefs had Safety Justin Reid to kick field goals and kickoffs in place of Harrison Butker. The only non-kicker to kick a game winning field goal was Texans RB Dare Ogunbowale vs Tampa Bay Buccaneers in 2023. After NFL's "landing zone" kick off adaption in 2024 to reduce injury risk and produce more kick offs returns. In 2026, New York Jets place Andrew Beck a fullback to kick off to address their kick off woes to cover kick off returns vs the Chiefs. Instead of a kicker who's not specialized at tackling, the kicking team's coverage improves with a more bigger player.

== Team standing ==
It is not uncommon for placekickers to be some of the smallest members of their team. However, The New York Times in 2011 wrote that NFL kickers had adopted year-round weight training and strict diets. Sebastian Janikowski that year was a 6-foot-2-inch (1.88 m) and 250-pound (110 kg) kicker. Kicker Rob Bironas, who was 6 feet (1.8 m) and 205 pounds (93 kg), noted, "I might be bigger than some wide receivers and cornerbacks."

The presence of foreign born-and-raised players in the highest levels of gridiron football has largely been limited to placekickers, and more recently to punters from Australia as well. Occasionally, these players come from outside the traditional American high school or college football systems—and most of the women to have played men's American football at the college level were placekickers. Notably Tom Landry recruited several soccer players from Latin America, such as Efren Herrera and Raphael Septien, to compete for the job of placekicker for the Dallas Cowboys. Cypriot Garo Yepremian was renowned as much for his kicking proficiency as he was for his complete lack of awareness of the sport early in his career. British-born kicker Mick Luckhurst was one of the first British players in the NFL to have a long career, playing seven seasons for the Atlanta Falcons during the 1980s and retiring as Atlanta's all-time leading scorer. Mexican kicker Raul Allegre played nine seasons in the NFL and won a Super Bowl in 1986. Austrian kicker Toni Fritsch played 12 seasons in the NFL and won a Super Bowl in 1972, becoming the only player in NFL history to have won a Super Bowl along with a top-flight association football title. These anecdotes increase the perception of the placekicker as an outsider.

As of 2026, only five kickers have been elected to the Pro Football Hall of Fame: George Blanda, Lou Groza, Jan Stenerud, Morten Andersen, and Adam Vinatieri, and among them, Stenerud, Andersen, and Vinatieri are the only ones who did not also play another position. There is only one special teams player (including punters, return specialists and long snappers) to ever win the NFL's MVP – Mark Moseley in 1982.

Nevertheless, due to their duties in kicking both field goals and extra points placekickers are usually responsible for scoring more points than any other player on a team, and very often entire football games may come down to a single kick. Of the top 50 career scoring leaders in NFL history, all but one are placekickers, with receiver Jerry Rice at number 45.

=== Numbering ===
In the NFL, placekickers, along with punters and quarterbacks, used to be among the only players allowed to wear single-digit uniform numbers; kickers can also wear numbers between 10 and 19.

In college and high school football, kickers can wear any number and usually wear one of an eligible receiver (1 to 49 or 80 to 99). Because kickers are generally less prominent on team rosters, and low uniform numbers are much more widely used among other positions at those levels, kickers are often given high jersey numbers that go unused by other players (such as numbers in the 40s or 90s). The two players in documented football history to have worn the uniform number 100, Chuck Kinder and Bill Bell, were both placekickers.

=== Outside North America ===
Despite a higher share of kickers in the NFL being foreign nationals than on any other position (except punter), the kicking game is not always the strong suit of teams outside North America. The NFL Europe was notable for employing former professional association football players as placekickers, some of them becoming fan favorites, like Manni Burgsmüller. The European League of Football in its inaugural 2021 season had a relatively high share of point after touchdown attempts miss or be blocked and had a notably higher share of two point conversion attempts even than the contemporary 2021 German Football League. The Cologne Centurions and the Leipzig Kings even had all their Field Goal attempts that season fail (0–1 and 0–3 respectively in a ten-game season). The Barcelona Dragons hired NFL alumnus Giorgio Tavecchio late in the season to improve their kicking game while the Hamburg Sea Devils got lucky with journeyman placekicker de:Phillip Friis Andersen making 17 out of 18 attempts during the regular season, including a game winning one in the league opener against Frankfurt Galaxy.

== Kicking style ==
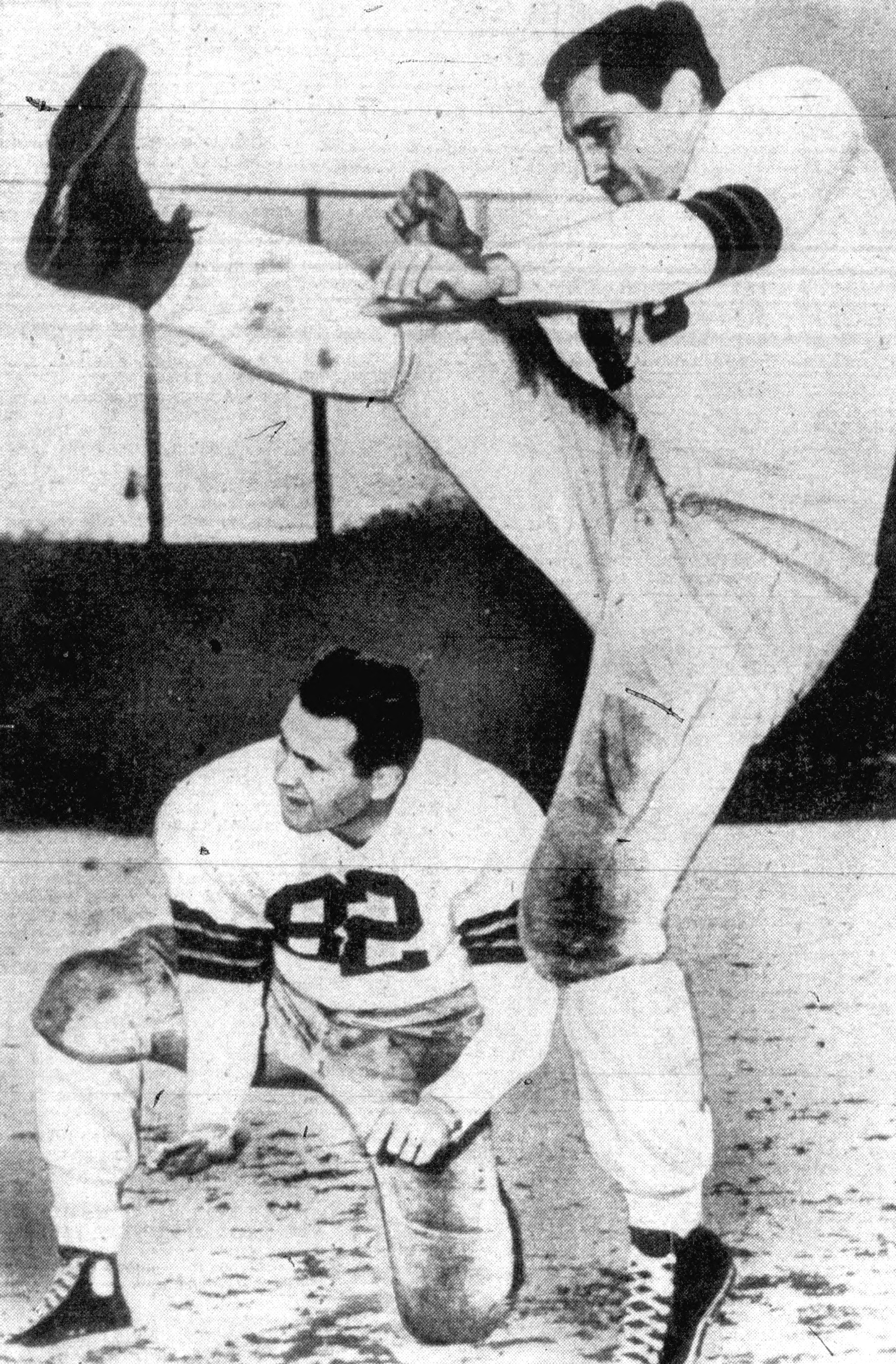
An example of a "straight on" style kick – Cleveland Browns kicker Lou Groza practices alongside Tommy James as holder

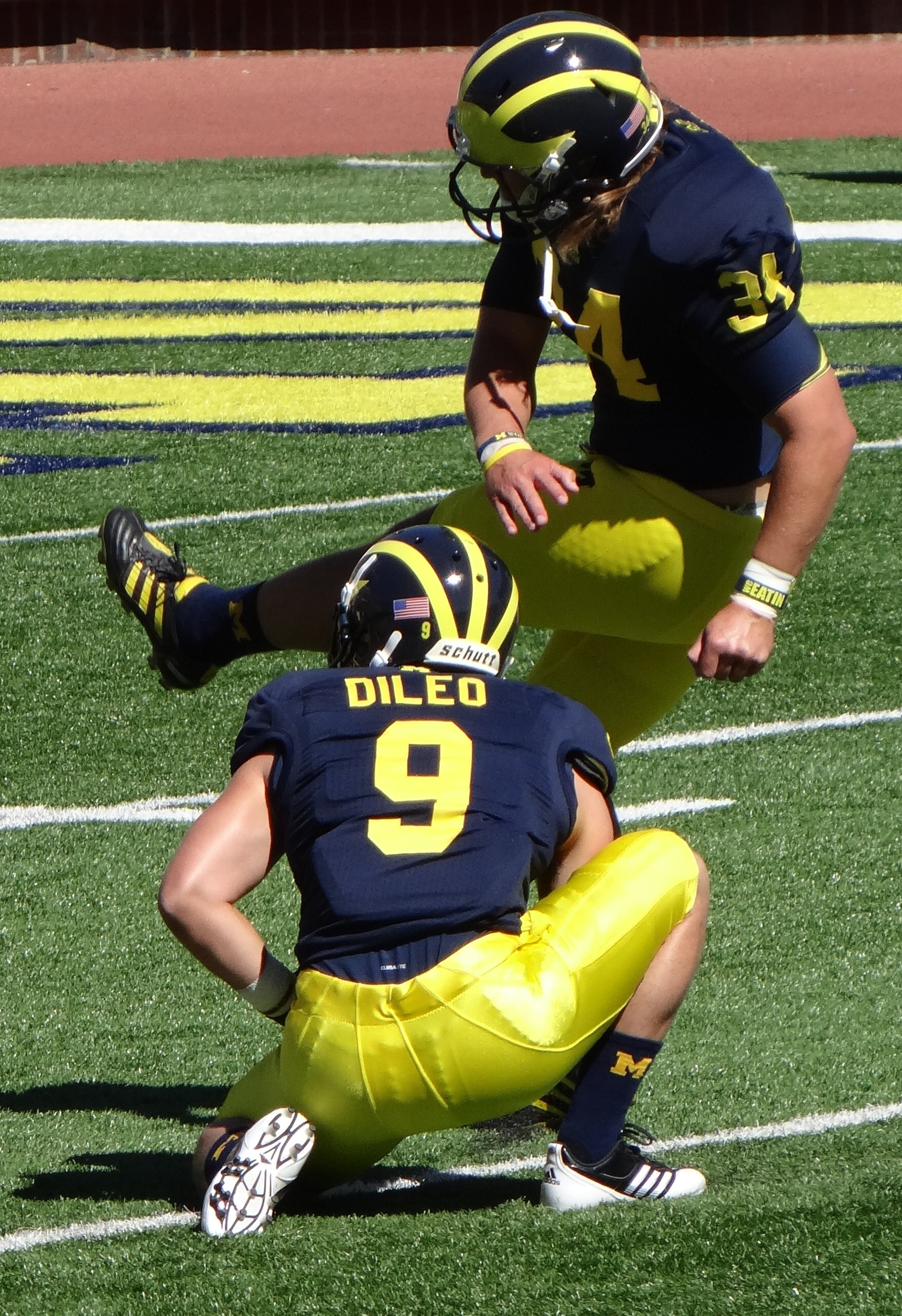
An example of a "soccer style" kick – Michigan Wolverines kicker Brendan Gibbons with Drew Dileo as holder

Placekickers today are predominantly "soccer-style" kickers, approaching the ball from several steps to the left of it [for a right-footed kicker, or vice versa] and several steps behind, striking the ball with the instep of the foot; all current National Football League kickers use this style. This method of kicking was introduced in 1957 by Fred Bednarski and popularized in the 1960s by kickers like Pete Gogolak and his younger brother Charlie, the first placekicker to be drafted in the first round.

Previously, most placekickers used a "straight on" style, which required the use of a special shoe that is extremely rigid and has a flattened and slightly upturned toe. In the straight on style, also known as "straight-toe" style, the kicker approaches the ball from directly behind, rather than from the side, and strikes the ball with the toe.

The last full-time straight on placekicker in the NFL was Mark Moseley who retired from the Cleveland Browns after the 1986 season, and the last straight-on kicker drafted into the NFL was Manny Matsakis from Capital University by the Philadelphia Eagles in 1984, who went on to have a successful college and coaching career. The Minnesota Vikings were the last NFL team to begin employing a soccer-style kicker, bringing in Benny Ricardo in 1983.

Straight on kickers are relatively uncommon in major college football due to the control and power disadvantages, but straight-on kickers are still seen on high school, small-college, semi-pro and amateur teams. Both of the top awards for kickers in college football are named after former straight-on kickers Fred Mitchell and Lou Groza but are now won by soccer-style players.

There are variations between soccer-style kicking: many of the early soccer-style NFL kickers had an action somewhat different from today's soccer-style kickers. There are also differences between college / preps vs most of the preps taught between kicking schools. Kicking Coach Paul Assad started teaching in the early 2000s what is termed "The Power X System" method used by most all of his over 51 NFL starting specialist students such as noteworthy, NFL greats like (Mason Crosby, Sebastian Janikowski, Matt Bryant among others) where there is a notable, differentials of leg alignment, foot position at impact, upper body positioning and sequence as well as "Plant Foot" positioning.

== Shoes ==
Placekickers in the modern game usually wear specialized shoes (soccer cleats). The reason for this is that, as compared to regular football cleats which use tougher and stiffer plastic, soccer cleats are primarily made out of leather. Kickers will also, in certain situations, wear two different cleats. One is their kicking cleat and the other is referred to as their plant foot. The reason that kickers will wear a football cleat on their plant foot as opposed to a soccer cleat is because the stiffer material will help the plant foot have a firm grip in the ground and hold the kicker's ankle in a tight position. In very rare circumstances, though, some prefer to kick barefoot. Tony Franklin was one such barefoot kicker, who played in Super Bowls for the Philadelphia Eagles and New England Patriots. Another was Rich Karlis, who once shared two kicking records - the record for longest field goal in Super Bowl history, kicking a 48-yard field goal in Super Bowl XXI to tie Jan Stenerud and also for the most field goals in a game, seven for Minnesota in 1989, tying Jim Bakken's record of the time, a record since broken by Rob Bironas. Englishman Rob Hart kicked barefoot during his seven year NFL Europe career. John Baker also used the style in the 1990s in the Canadian Football League, as did José Cortéz in the XFL. The last person to kick barefoot in an NFL game was Jeff Wilkins in 2002.

A unique shoe was worn by New Orleans Saints kicker Tom Dempsey; Dempsey had a deformed kicking foot that left him with a flat kicking surface at the front of his foot, and he wore a shoe that accommodated it. After Dempsey kicked a record-setting 63-yard field goal using the special shoe in 1970, the league instituted a rule change establishing standards for kicking shoes in 1977, informally known as the "Tom Dempsey Rule", that "any shoe that is worn by a player with an artificial limb on his kicking leg must have a kicking surface that conforms to that of a normal kicking shoe." Dempsey played for two more years after the rule's institution, retiring in 1979.

Barefoot kickers are banned in the vast majority of high school games, due to a rule by the National Federation of State High School Associations, which requires all players to wear shoes. Texas plays by NCAA rules, and therefore barefoot kickers are legal in Texas.
