= Bednarski =

Bednarski (feminine: Bednarska, plural: Bednarscy) is a Polish surname. Notable people with the surname include:

- Bob Bednarski (1944–2004), American heavyweight weightlifter
- Fred Bednarski (1936–2024) Polish American football placekicker
- John Bednarski (born 1952), Canadian ice hockey defenceman
- Josef Bednarski (born 1941), Polish professional wrestler and bodybuilder
- Jacek Bednarski (1939–2008), Polish chess International Master
- Krzysztof Bednarski (born 1953), Polish sculptor
- Scott Bednarski (born 1966), American professional wrestler
- Steven Bednarski (born 1973), Canadian historian and actor
