= Drew Cove =

Cove on the Budd Coast of Antarctica

Drew Cove (66°20′S 110°30′E) is a cove indenting the west side of Mitchell Peninsula on the Budd Coast. It was first mapped from air photos taken by U.S. Navy Operation Highjump and Operation Windmill in 1947 and 1948, and was named by the Advisory Committee on Antarctic Names for Chief Construction Electrician John W. Drew, U.S. Navy, a member of the Wilkes Station party of 1958.
