= Gabriel Fulga =

Romanian footballer

Personal information
- Full name: Gabriel Mirel Fulga
- Date of birth: 28 February 2004 (age 22)
- Place of birth: Orșova, Romania
- Height: 1.85 m (6 ft 1 in)
- Position: Forward

Team information
- Current team: Unirea Dej (on loan from FCSB)
- Number: 18

Youth career
- Luceafărul Drobeta Turnu Severin
- Sport Kids Drobeta Turnu Severin
- –2019: Pro Junior Craiova
- 2019–2022: FCSB

Senior career*
Years	Team	Apps	(Gls)
2021–2024	FCSB	3	(0)
2021–2022	FCSB II	5	(3)
2022–2024	→ Unirea Dej (loan)	40	(1)

International career
2021	Romania U17	2	(1)
- * Club domestic league appearances and goals as of 13 April 2024

Gabriel Mirel Fulga (born 28 February 2004) is a Romanian professional footballer who plays as a forward.

Fulga signed with FCSB in 2019, debuting afterward in the 2020–21 season of Liga I.
