= Sparkes Bay =

Bay in Antarctica

Sparkes Bay (66°22′S 110°32′E) is a bay, 1 nautical mile (1.9 km) wide and indenting 2.5 nautical miles (4.6 km) between Mitchell Peninsula on the north and Robinson Ridge and Odbert Island on the south, in the Windmill Islands. First mapped from air photos taken by U.S. Navy Operation Highjump and Operation Windmill in 1947 and 1948. Named by the Advisory Committee on Antarctic Names (US-ACAN) for Lieutenant Robert S. Sparkes, U.S. Navy, military leader at Wilkes Station in 1958.
