= Orșova =

- Municipality
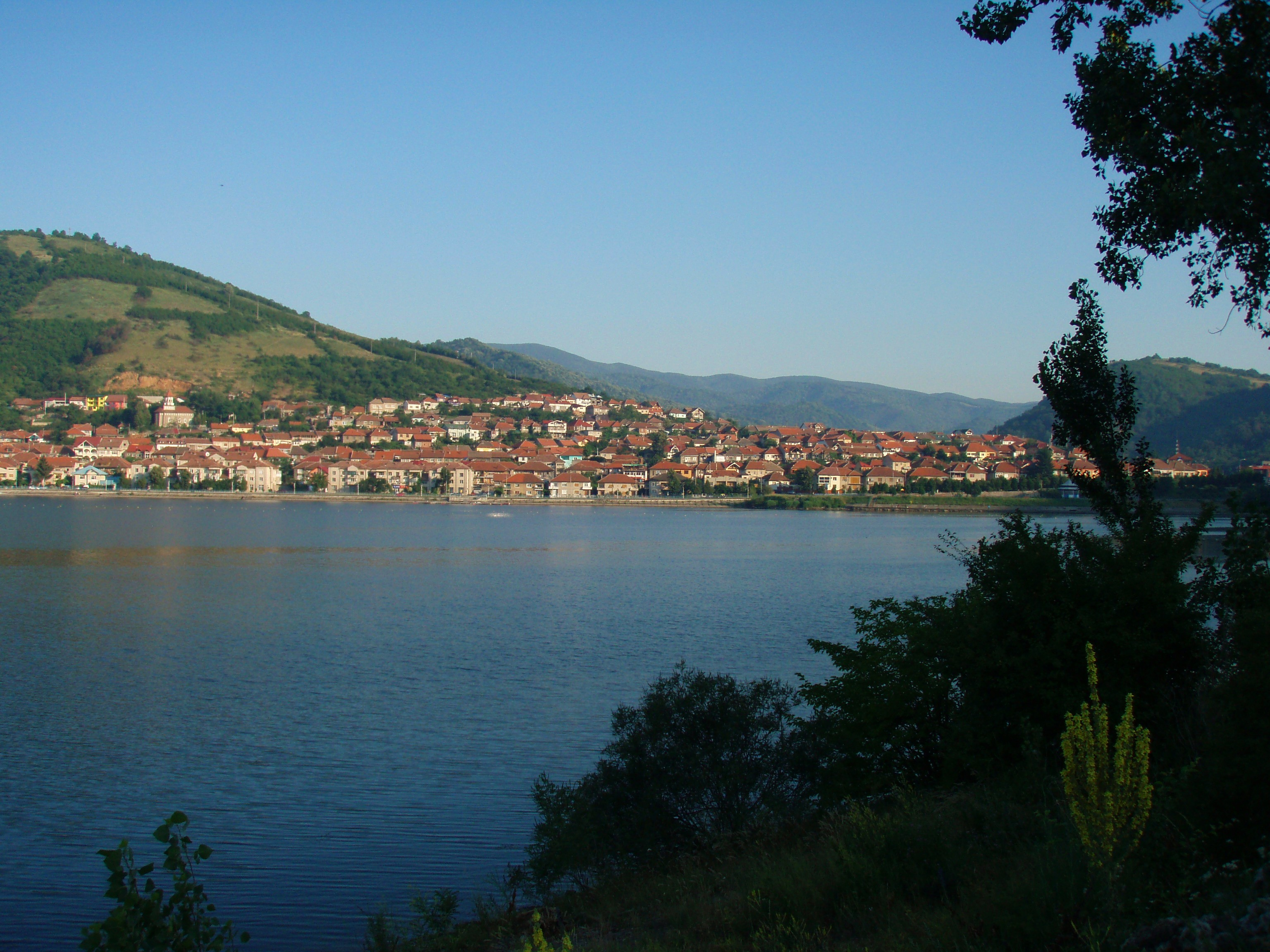

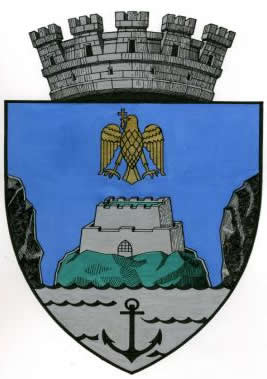
- Coat of arms

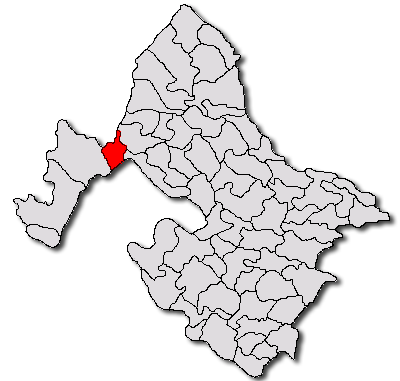
- Location in Mehedinți County

- Location in Romania
- Coordinates: 44°43′31″N 22°23′46″E
- Country: Romania
- County: Mehedinți

Government
  - Mayor (2024–2028): Adrian Cican (PNL)
- Area: 54.67 km^{2} (21.11 sq mi)
- Elevation: 59 m (194 ft)
- Population (2021-12-01): 8,506
  - Density: 155.6/km^{2} (403.0/sq mi)
- Time zone: UTC+02:00 (EET)
  - Summer (DST): UTC+03:00 (EEST)
- Postal code: 225200
- Area code: (+40) 0252
- Vehicle reg.: MH
- Website: primariaorsova.ro

Orșova (Romanian pronunciation: [ˈorʃova]; Hungarian: Orsova; German: Orschowa; Serbian: Оршава/Oršava; Turkish: Irşova) is a port city on the Danube river in southwestern Romania's Mehedinți County. It is one of four localities in the Banat historical region situated just above the Iron Gates where the Cerna River meets the Danube.

== History ==
- The locality was the site of a Roman port in Dacia Malvensis, and the site of the Roman city and fort of Dierna
- In 1925, a confusion by the scholar Nándor Fettich misplaced the important Magyar burial site discovered at Cheglevici into the Orșova region. Later, the location of that discovery, testifying to the presence of the Magyars since the early 10th century, was clarified for the archeological community.
- King Ladislaus I of Hungary decisively defeated the Cumans near Orșova in 1091.
- It was a major border fortification in the Middle Ages.
- The city was captured by Suleiman the Magnificent in 1522.
- Orșova became part of the Habsburg monarchy in 1687 at the start of an Ottoman-Habsburg War, but Ottoman forces recaptured it in 1690. The Treaty of Passarowitz gave the city back to the Kingdom of Hungary in 1718. The Treaty of Belgrade gave the city back to the Ottoman Empire in 1739. Finally, The Treaty of Sistova gave the city back to the Kingdom of Hungary in 1791. The city remained in Hungary until the end of World War I, when it became part of Romania. It was included in the Mehedinți county during the administrative reform of 1968.
- The Hungarian Crown of Saint Stephen was buried near Orșova from 1848 till 1853.
- During the works at the Iron Gates, the old center of the town was flooded and Orșova was developed (1966–1971) on higher ground, including the southern side of the Almăj Mountain and the villages of Jupalnic, Tufari, and Coramnic. Also flooded then was the neighboring Ada Kaleh, with the scattering of the mostly Turkish community of the Danube island. Ada Kaleh and its inhabitants, as well as the ancient city, are still present in the memory of its surviving locals.

== Economy ==
The town is a center for the extraction of bentonite, chromium, and granite. The industry is centered on energy production (the hydroelectric plant), shipbuilding and engine manufacturing, assembly parts for electricity production, textiles, and the processing of feldspar, asbestos, quartz, talc, wood, etc.

The Orșova shipyard was constructed in 1890 and like a small reparation shop for the vessels which participated to the navigable channel from Iron Gate Romania- Sip Yugoslavia and had a continuously development a long time. After the year 1991 the name was changed and also the organizational profile.

A wind farm is being developed in the city territory, on a hill nearby (at 4.5 km from the agglomeration); the first turbines became active there in 2009.

== Tourist attractions ==
- Sfânta Ana Monastery in Orșova
- Roman catholic church from Orșova, historical monument
- Rock Sculpture of Decebalus, the tallest rock relief in Europe
- Clisura Dunării (Danube gorge)
- Mraconia Monastery
- Danube Gulf
- Iron Gate Hydroelectric Power Station (Dam 1), the largest dam on the Danube river

== Natives ==
- Ignat Bednarik (1882–1963), painter
- Alexandru Fölker (born 1956), handball player
- Stefan Fröhlich (1889–1978), Luftwaffe general
- Gabriel Fulga (born 2004), football player
- Teodora Gîdoiu (born 1986), rowing cox
- Adrian Moescu (born 2001), football player
- Adrian Munteanu (born 1997), rower
- Eduard Radaslavescu (born 2004), football player

== Image gallery ==
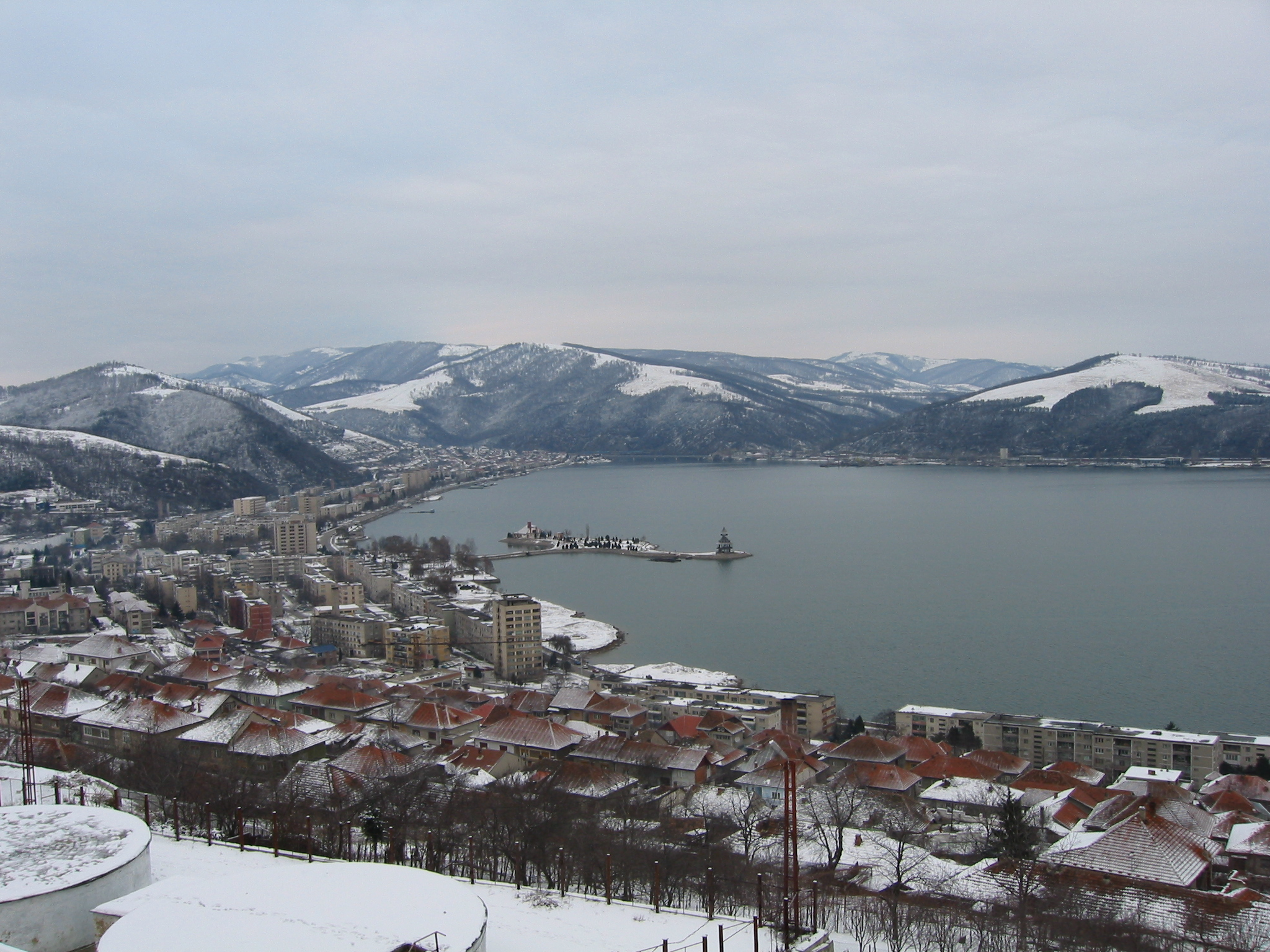
Winter view of Orșova

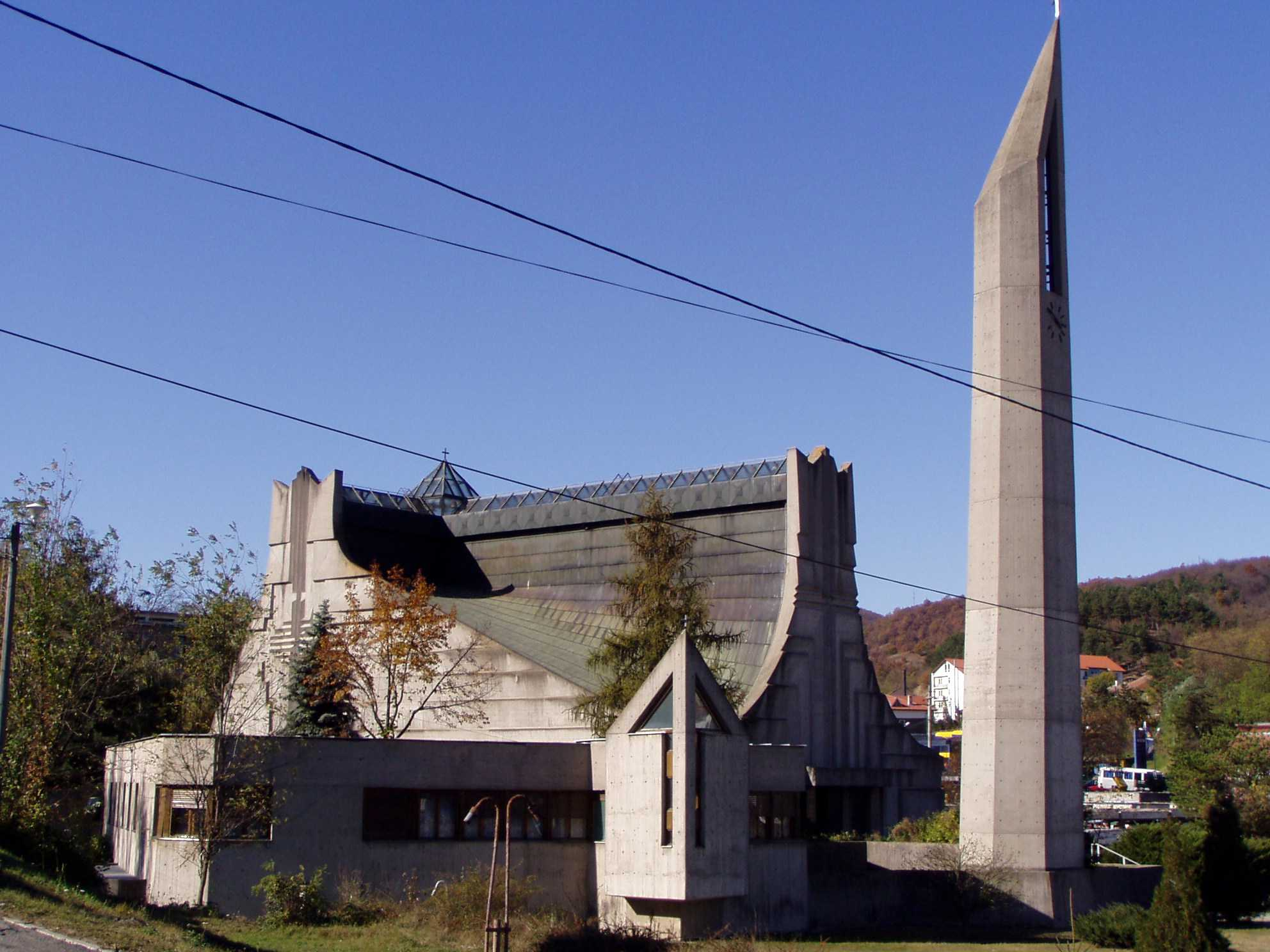
Roman Catholic church

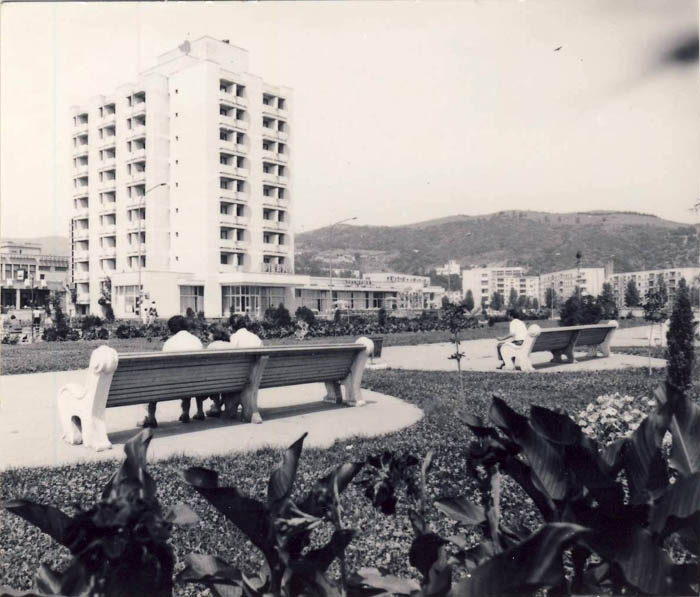
Orșova in 1978

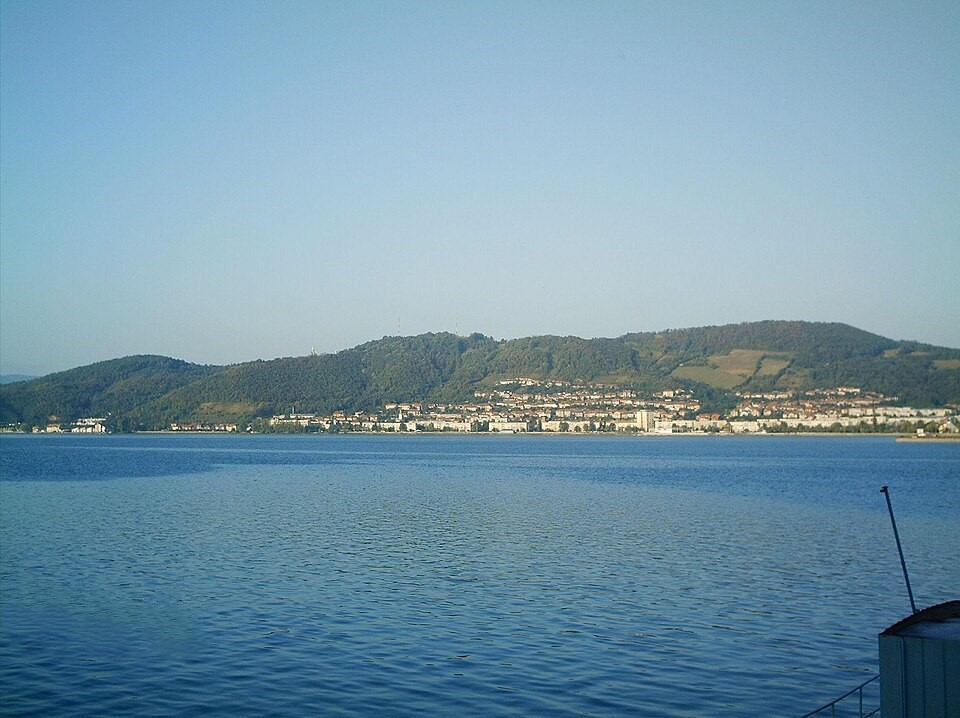
Danube in Orșova

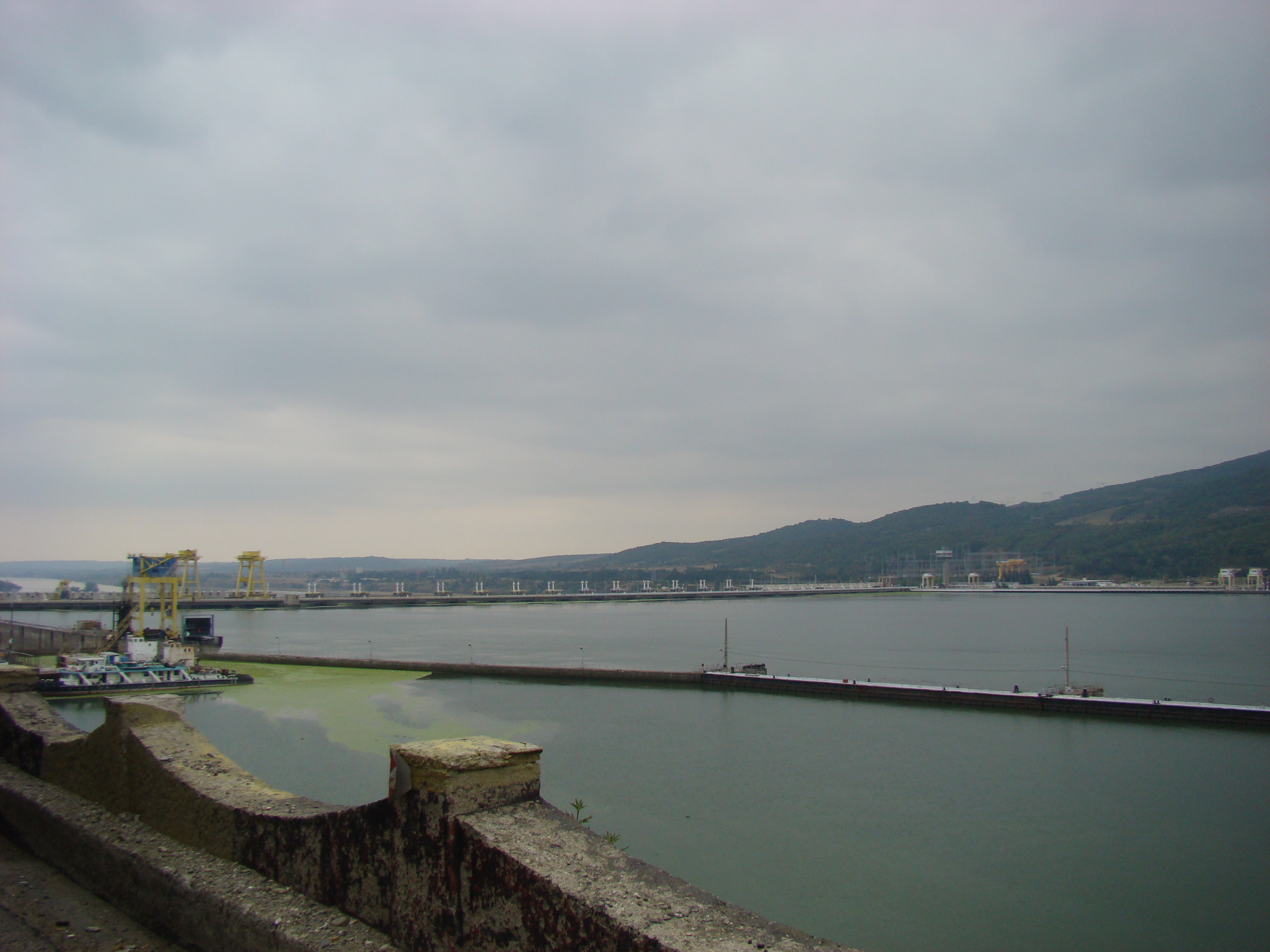
Danube in Orșova

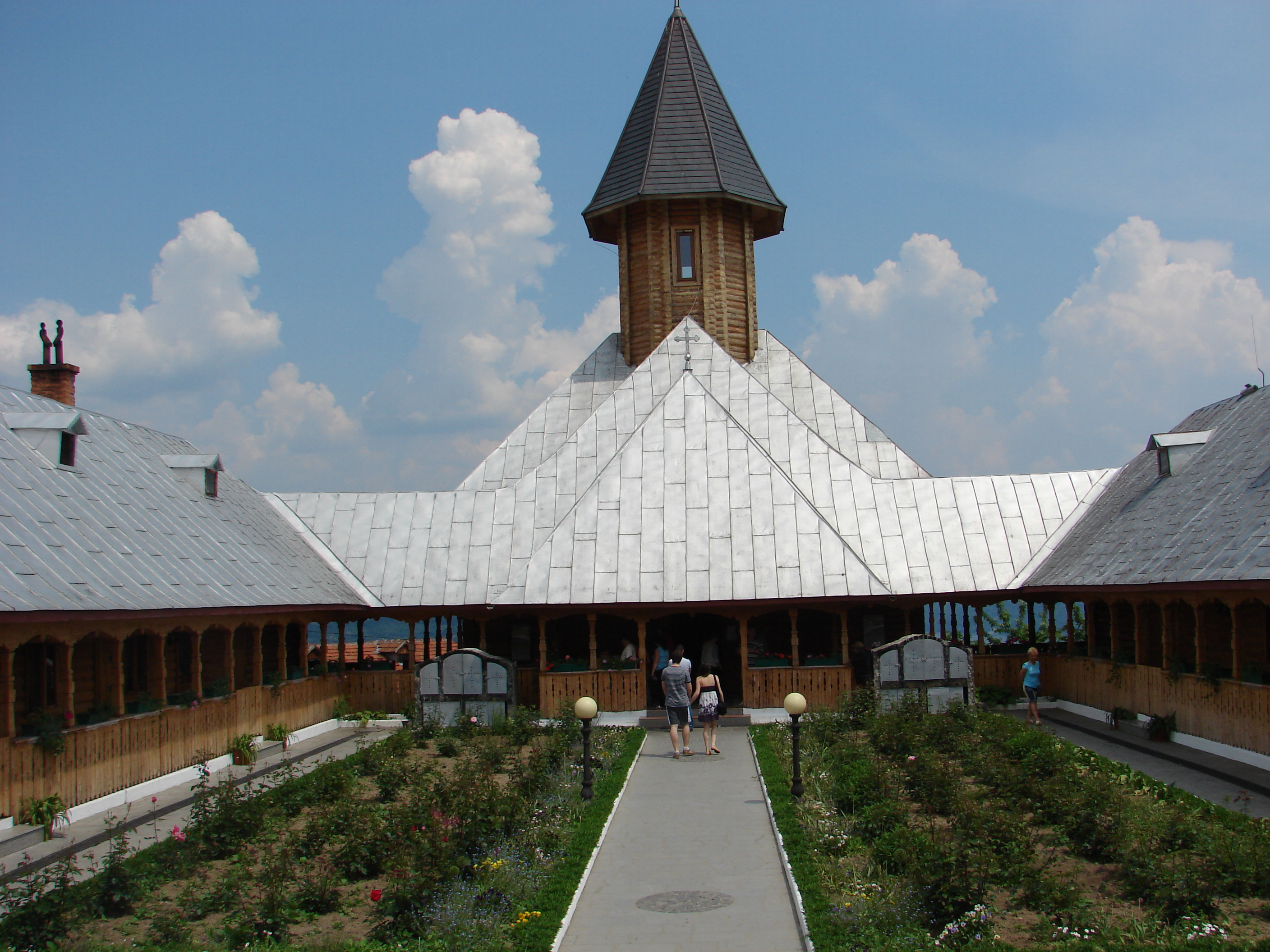
Sfânta Ana Monastery

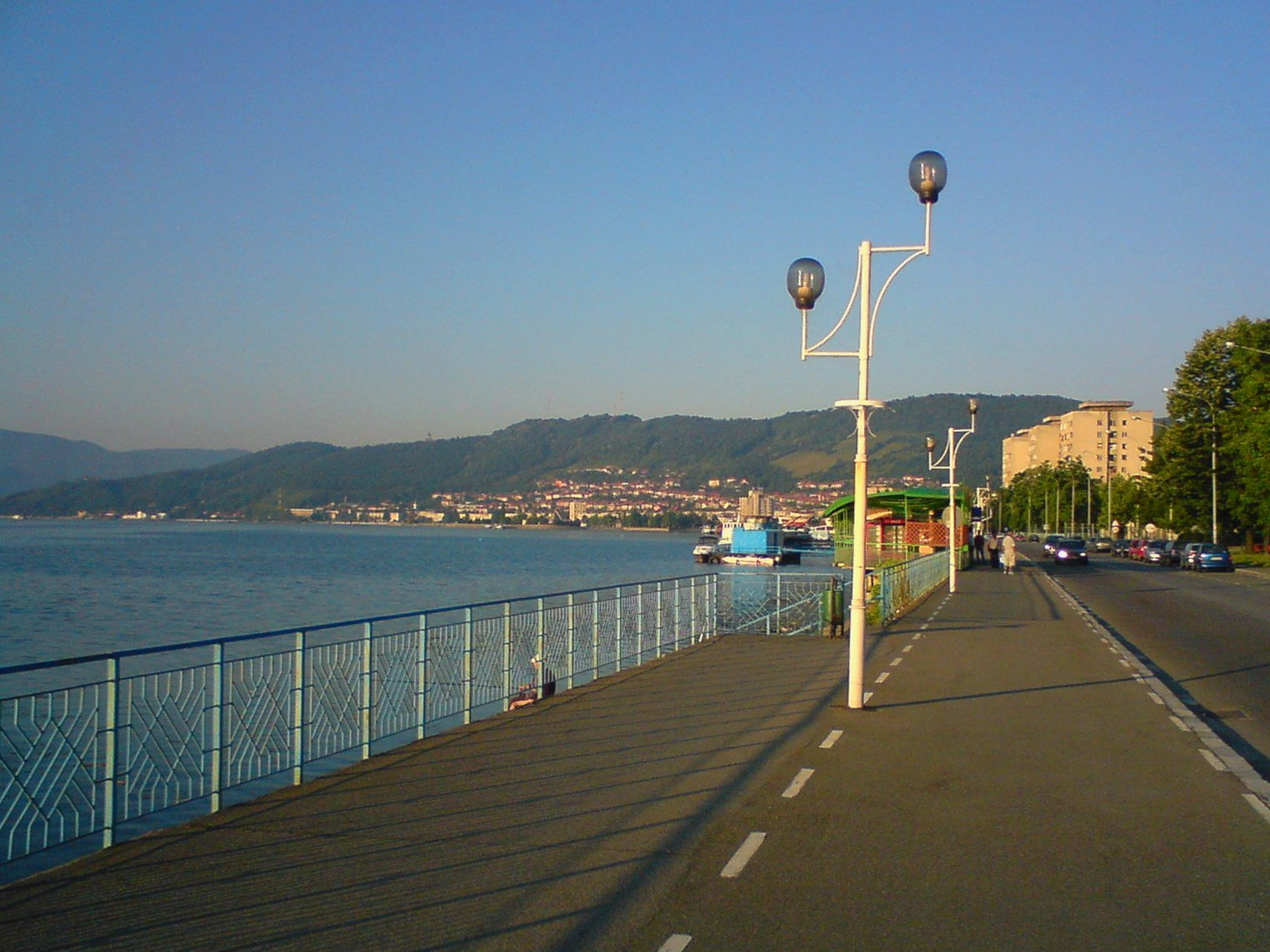
Orșova Promenade

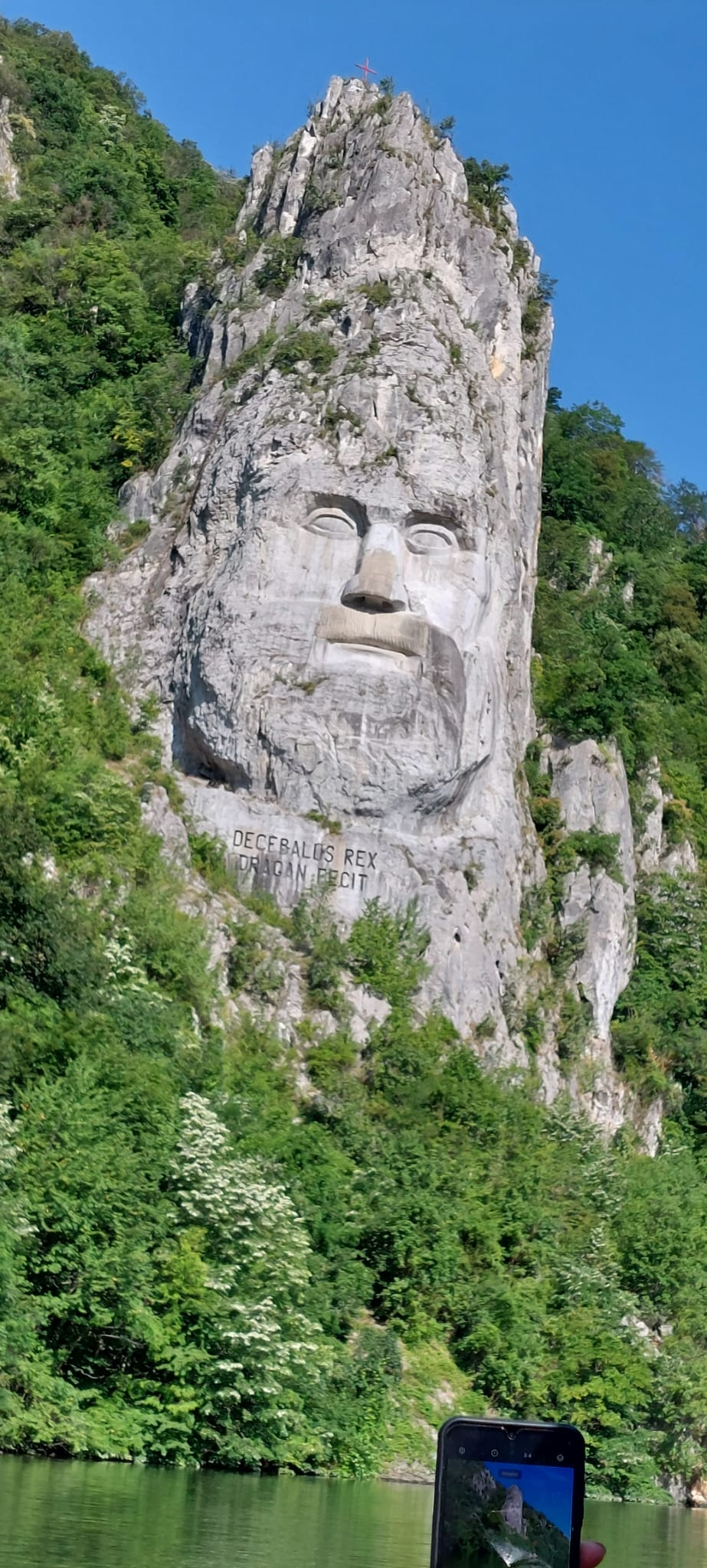
Rock Sculpture of Decebalus

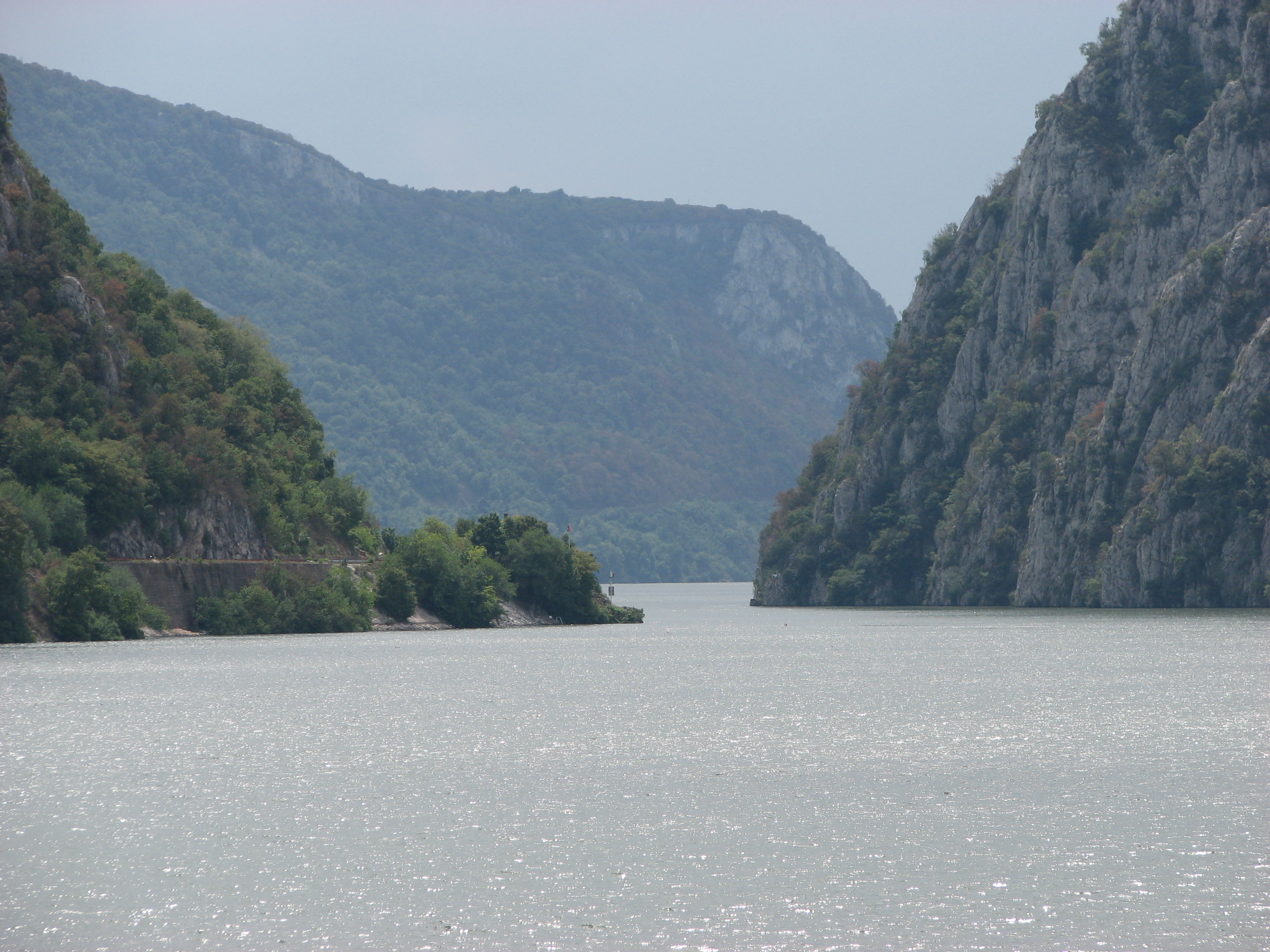
Danube gorge

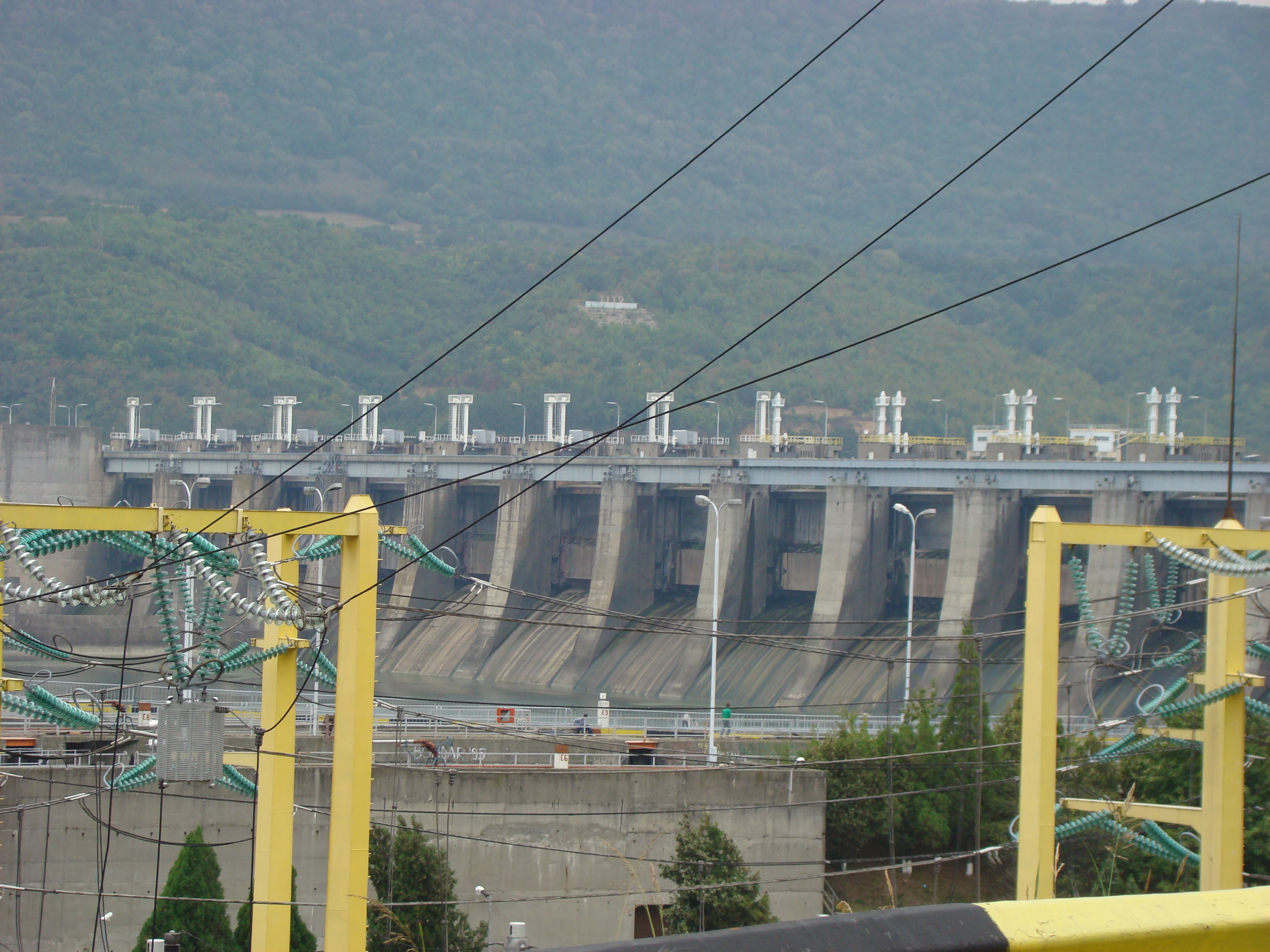
Iron Gate Power Station

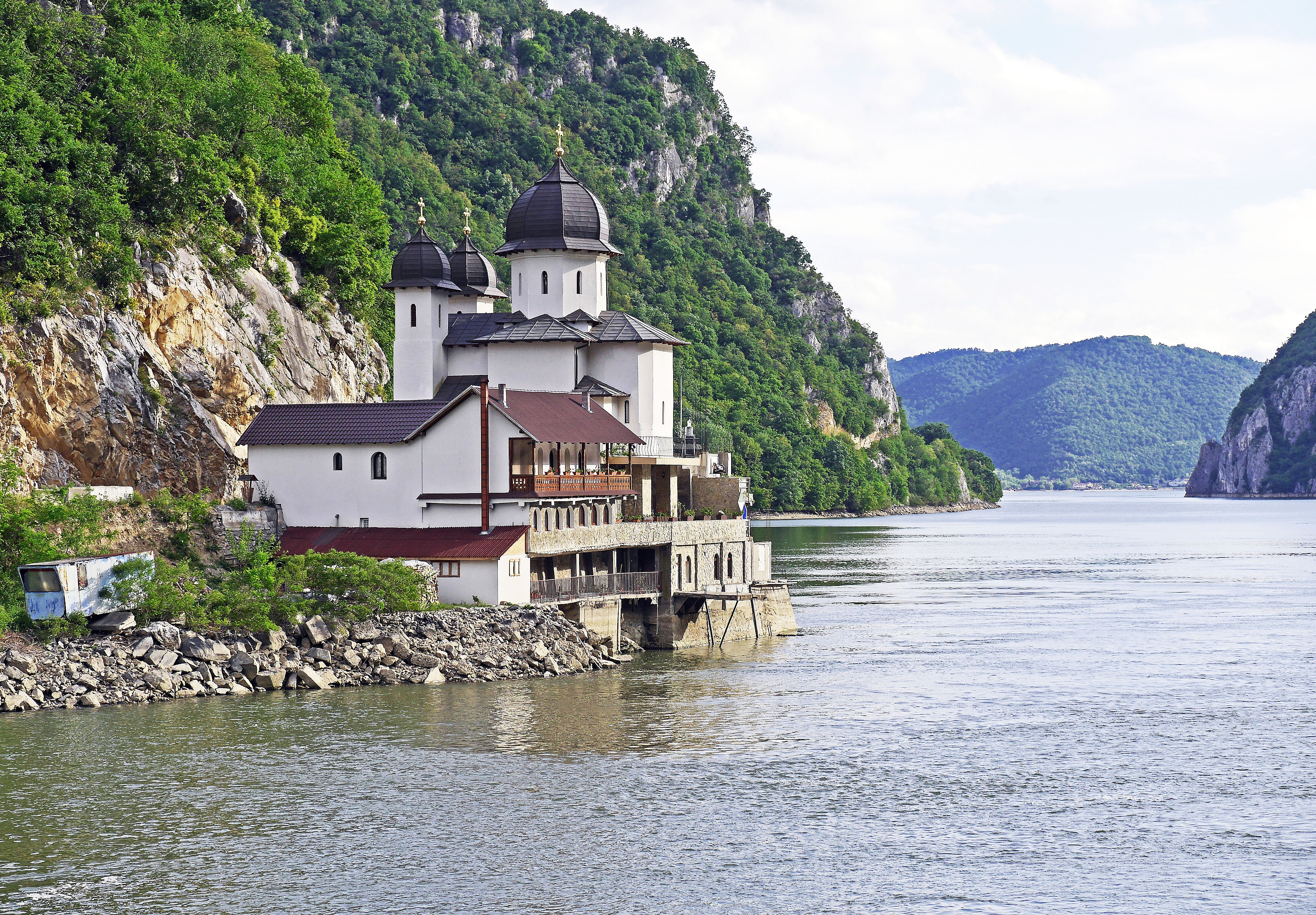
Mraconia Monastery
