= Warrington Island =

Island in Antarctica

Warrington Island (66°20′S 110°28′E) is a rocky island, 0.7 nautical miles (1.3 km) long, lying immediately south of Pidgeon Island in the Windmill Islands. First mapped from aerial photographs taken by U.S. Navy Operation Highjump, 1946–47. Named by Advisory Committee on Antarctic Names (US-ACAN) for W.H. Warrington, photographer's mate on U.S. Navy Operation Highjump flights in this and other coastal areas between 14 and 164 East longitude.

== See also ==
- List of antarctic and sub-antarctic islands
