= Elena Alexandrina Bednarik =

Romanian painter (1883–1939)

- Born: Elena Alexandrina Barabaș; 19 April 1883
- Died: 24 February 1939 (aged 55)
- Occupation: Painter
- Spouse: Ignat Bednarik
- Children: Beatrice Bednarik

Elena Alexandrina Barabaș-Bednarik (19 April 1883 – 24 February 1939) was a Romanian painter and art teacher.

== Biography ==
Bednarik graduated from the National School of Art in Bucharest in 1908, where she was taught by Dimitrie Serafim. From 1909 to 1912, she studied at the Academy of Fine Arts in Munich. She later became a painting teacher at the high schools "Principesa Elena" in Brașov, "Domnița Ileana" and "Notre-Dame" in Bucharest.

She had one child, Beatrice. When her first child, Beatrice Bednarik, was born, Elena Alexandrina Bednarik was 39 years old. She married Romanian painter Ignat Bednarik and died in Mogoșoaia.

== Artwork ==
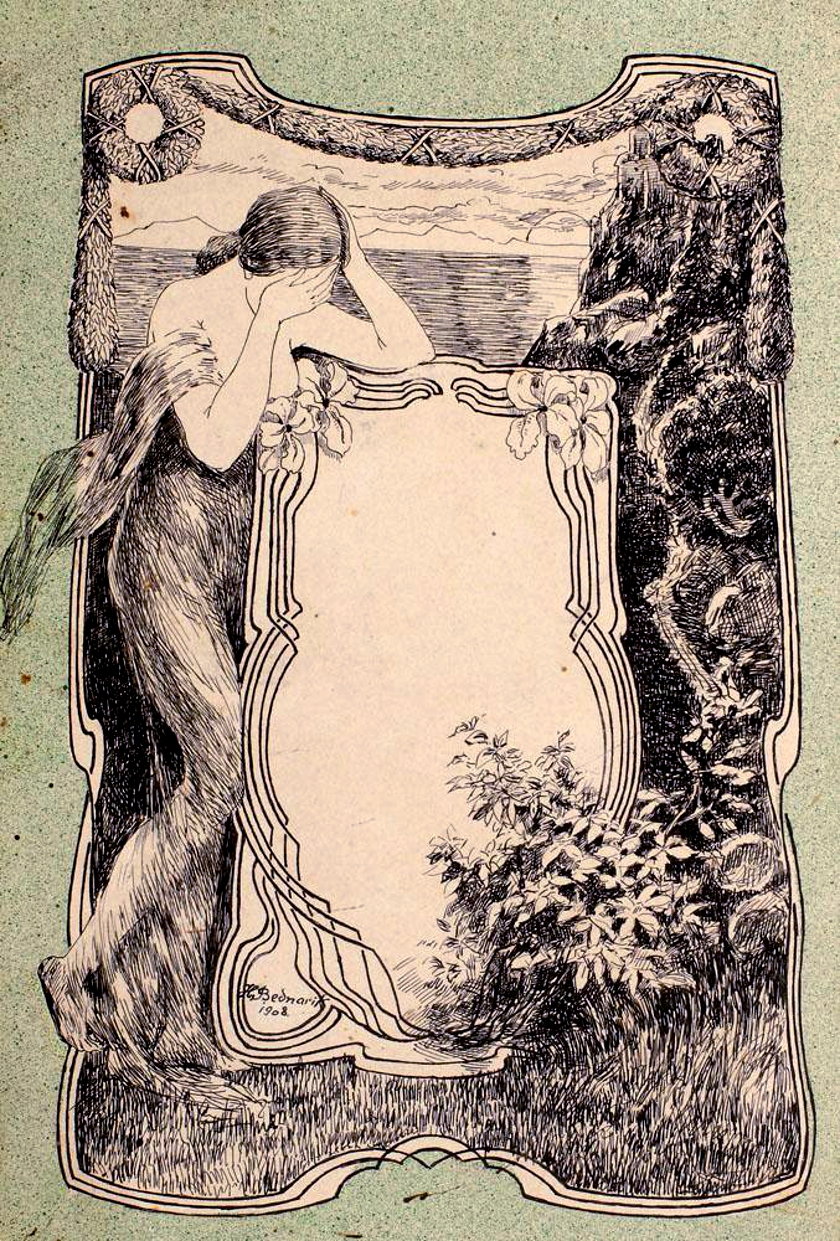
Art Nouveau vignette to the Romanian story Zâna Apelor ("Water Fairy")

Bednarik created works depicting Romanian fairy tales, as well as political cartoons.
