= Andrzej Bednarz =

Polish footballer

Personal information
- Full name: Andrzej Bednarz
- Date of birth: 22 December 1980 (age 45)
- Place of birth: Kraków, Poland
- Height: 1.88 m (6 ft 2 in)
- Position: Centre-back

Senior career*
Years	Team	Apps	(Gls)
1999	Hutnik Kraków		
2000	Górnik Wieliczka		
2000	Hutnik Kraków	1	(0)
2001	Karpaty Siepraw	19	(0)
2001–2002	Cracovia	14	(1)
2003	Kalwarianka Kalwaria Zebrzydowska		
2003	Pogoń Miechów		
2004	Arka Gdynia	5	(0)
2004	RKS Radomsko	16	(1)
2005	Piast Gliwice	19	(2)
2006	Radomiak Radom	14	(1)
2006–2007	Górnik Zabrze	20	(0)
2007	Kmita Zabierzów	9	(1)
2008	Czarni Żagań	9	(3)
2009	Radomiak Radom		
2009	Saba	0	(0)
2010	Zob Ahan	0	(0)
2011	Radomiak Radom	2	(0)
2011	B71 Sandoy	8	(0)
- * Club domestic league appearances and goals

Andrzej Bednarz (born 22 December 1980) is a Polish former professional footballer who played as a defender.

== Club career ==
After a career exclusively in the first, second and third Polish divisions, Bednarz signed with Saba, becoming the first Pole to sign for an Iranian club.
