= Jan Bednarek (politician) =

Polish politician

Deputy of the V Sejm
- In office 2005 – 2007
- Constituency: 40 Koszalin

Personal details
- Born: 10 August 1955 (age 70); Główczyce, Poland
- Political party: Self-Defence of the Republic of Poland

Jan Paweł Bednarek (born 10 August 1955) is a Polish politician. He was elected to the Sejm on 25 September 2005, getting 1102 votes in 40 Koszalin constituency as a candidate from the Self-Defence of the Republic of Poland list.

== See also ==
- Members of Polish Sejm 2005-2007
