= Bednarz Cove =

Bednarz Cove (66°21′S 110°32′E) is a cove in the south side of Mitchell Peninsula on Budd Coast. It was first mapped from air photos taken by U.S. Navy Operation Highjump and Operation Windmill in 1947 and 1948, and named by the Advisory Committee on Antarctic Names for Chief Electronics Technician Donald F. Bednarz, U.S. Navy, a member of the Wilkes Station party of 1958.
