= Daniel Bednárik =

Slovak footballer

Personal information
- Date of birth: 10 March 1994 (age 32)
- Place of birth: Slovakia
- Position: Centre back

Youth career
- Piešťany
- 2009–2012: Trenčín

Senior career*
Years	Team	Apps	(Gls)
2012–2016	Trenčín	9	(1)
- * Club domestic league appearances and goals

Daniel Bednárik (born 10 March 1994) is a Slovak former football defender who played nine league matches for the Fortuna Liga club AS Trenčín.

He is best known for his time at Slovak club Trenčin. Considered a talented young player, his time at the club would be plagued with injuries to his knee, resulting in him only playing in the 2013–14 season.

== Club career ==
=== Trenčin ===
Bednárik made his professional debut for AS Trenčín senior side on 2 March 2013 in the Corgoň Liga match against Spartak Myjava. He scored his first goal for Trenčin in a 3–0 win against FC Nitra, scoring in the 45th minute to increase the score line to 2–0. After recovering from an injury to his knee, Bednárik signed his first professional contract with Trenčin, signing a three-and-a-half-year contract with the club. He played against IFK Göteborg in the second qualifying round of the 2013–14 UEFA Europa League in July of the same year. On 22 April 2013, Bednárik received a red card in a 2–1 loss against MŠK Žilina.

=== After football ===
After retiring from football, Bednárik worked in the public sector as an analyst at the Value for Money Unit of the Ministry of Finance. He had had to quit football due to health problems. This was followed by a period during which he cycled 20,000 kilometers through 33 countries on three continents, and about which he wrote a book called In Escape, where he describes his travel experiences and his experiences and various life dilemmas.

== International career ==
On 28 May 2013, Bednárik was nominated for the Slovakia national under-19 football team for a tournament in Serbia.

== Career statistics ==
Club performance			League		Cup		Continental		Total	
Season	Club	League	Apps	Goals	Apps	Goals	Apps	Goals	Apps	Goals
Slovakia			League		Slovak Cup		Europe		Total	
2012–13	AS Trenčín	Corgoň Liga	8	1	0	0	0	0	8	1
2013–14	AS Trenčín	Corgoň Liga	1	0	0	0	1	0	2	0
Career total			9	1	0	0	1	0	10	1
