= Pidgeon Island =

Island in Antarctica

- Location within Antarctica

Geography
- Location: Antarctica
- Coordinates: 66°19′S 110°27′E
- Archipelago: Windmill Islands
- Length: 2 km (1.2 mi)

Administration
- Administered under the Antarctic Treaty System

Demographics
- Population: Uninhabited

Pidgeon Island is a rocky Antarctic island, 2 kilometres (1 nmi) long, between Midgley Island and Mitchell Peninsula in the Windmill Islands. It was first mapped from air photos taken by USN Operation Highjump and Operation Windmill in 1947 and 1948. It was named by the US-ACAN for E. C. Pidgeon, Photographer's Mate on Operation Highjump flights in this area and other coastal areas between 14 and 164 East longitude. Thought to be a separate unit, the eastern part of this feature was previously named O'Brien Islet. The name O'Brien is now applied to the bay north of Mitchell Peninsula.

== Lynsky Cove ==
Lynsky Cove is a cove in the north side of the island. Named by the US-ACAN for Chief Builder James E. Lynsky, USN, a member of the Wilkes Station party of 1958.

== See also ==
- Composite Antarctic Gazetteer
- Harrigan Hill
- List of Antarctic and sub-Antarctic islands
- List of Antarctic islands south of 60° S
- SCAR
- Territorial claims in Antarctica
