= Pierre Laprade =

French painter (1875–1931)

Pierre Laprade (July 25, 1875 – December 23, 1931) was a French painter and member of the Salon d'Automne jury. He was a post-impressionist known for soft landscapes.
