= Robert Bednarek =

Polish footballer

Personal information
- Full name: Robert Bednarek
- Date of birth: 23 February 1979 (age 47)
- Place of birth: Słupsk, Poland
- Height: 1.80 m (5 ft 11 in)
- Position: Defender

Senior career*
| Years | Team | Apps | (Gls) |
| 1998–2000 | Chemik Bydgoszcz | | |
| 2001–2004 | Amica Wronki | 16 | (0) |
| 2004–2009 | Korona Kielce | 124 | (4) |
| 2009–2011 | Arka Gdynia | 25 | (0) |
| 2011–2012 | Nielba Wągrowiec | 10 | (0) |
| 2012–2014 | Chojniczanka Chojnice | 28 | (0) |
| 2014–2016 | Unia Solec Kujawski | | |

Managerial career
- 2013–2014: Chojniczanka Chojnice (player-assistant)
- 2014–2016: Unia Solec Kujawski (player-manager)
- 2017: KP Starogard Gdański
- 2017–2018: Unia Janikowo
- * Club domestic league appearances and goals

Robert Bednarek (born 23 February 1979) is a Polish football manager and former player who played as a defender.

== Career ==
=== Club ===
Bednarek has previously played for Amica Wronki and Korona Kielce in the Ekstraklasa.

He was released from Arka Gdynia on 30 June 2011.

== Honours ==
Korona Kielce

- II liga: 2004–05
