= Alexandru Busuioceanu =

Romanian writer and diplomat

Alexandru Busuioceanu (Romanian pronunciation: [alekˈsandru busujoˈt͡ʃe̯anu]; January 1896 in Slatina – March 13, 1961, Madrid) was a Romanian essayist, poet, historian and diplomat.

As a historian, Busuioceanu wrote studies about Zamolxis, the god of the ancient Dacians. He also wrote art books on the paintings in the collection of the Romanian Royal Family and on the watercolour paintings of Amedeo Preziosi.

He died in Madrid under mysterious circumstances.

== Works ==
- Une miniature inédite du XIIIe siècle reproduisant une oeuvre de Pietro Cavallini, 1928
- Iser, 1930
- Daniele da Volterra e la storia di un motivo pittorico, 1932.
- Intorno a Franco-Bolognese. 1934
- Les Tableaux au Greco dans la collection royale de Roumanie 1934
- Preziosi, 1935
- Domenico Theotocopuli El Greco. Exposition organisée par la Gazette des Beaux-Arts. - 1937
- Poemas pateticos, 1948
- La Peinture espagnole: 2. De Velasquez à Picasso. Texte de Jacques Lassaigne. Biographies et bibliographie - 1952
- Proporción de vivir - poemas, 1954)
- Georges Cioranescu. Un poète roumain en Espagne - 1962)
