= Fred Bednarski =

American football player (1936–2024)

No. 5
- Positions: Kicker, Fullback

Personal information
- Born: 12 December 1936; Uście Biskupie, Poland (today Ustia, Ukraine)
- Died: 23 March 2024 (aged 87); Austin, Texas
- Listed height: 6 ft 0 in (1.83 m)
- Listed weight: 185 lb (84 kg)

Career information
- High school: Travis High School
- College: The University of Texas

Career history
- 1956-1958: Texas

Ferdynard "Fred" Z. Bednarski, Jr. (12 December 1936 – 23 March 2024) was an American football player who, as a placekicker for the Texas Longhorns, kicked the first "soccer-style" field goal in American football history. He is often credited with introducing the "soccer-style" kick to American football, which revolutionized the element of place-kicking in the sport.

== Early life ==
Born in Uście Biskupie, Poland (now in Ukraine), on 12 December 1936, before Soviet and then German occupation of the country in World War II, his family was taken to a Nazi labor camp outside of Salzburg, Austria in 1942, where they would spend three years. He considered himself fortunate for having been taken a "labor" or "concentration" camp rather than an extermination camp, as was the fate for many other Polish families. At the camps, when they could find some free time, Bednarski recalls playing games with other camp detainees using makeshift soccer balls constructed from rolled-up socks. He and his family were freed from the camps by American soldiers in 1945, but as there hometown had become part of the Soviet Union (as part of Ukraine) they did not go home.

They lived in a displaced persons camp for three years before they finally immigrated to Smithville, Texas in 1949.

Later they moved to Austin, Texas where he was a kicker and punter at Fulmore Junior High School. At Travis High School he was an all-city fullback and kicker.

== Career ==
Bednarski's football career began with the Texas Longhorns where he was invited by then head coach Ed Price to walk on in 1955.

He became the kicker in 1956, but was used only for kick-offs - because of rules that didn't allow for a kicking specialist to kick point afters. In 1956 a scout for future head coach Darrell Royal of the Washington Huskies returned from scouting Texas and was impressed with Bednarski and his "soccer-style" kick. In contrast to the traditional football place kick in universal use at the time, in which the kicker would approach the placement from directly behind and strike the ball with his toe, Bednarski approached the placement from roughly a 45-degree angle and struck the ball with the instep of his foot, swinging his leg in a "golf club"-like motion.

On 19 October 1957, Bednarski kicked the first-ever "soccer-style" field goal in American football history, giving the team a 3-0 lead against Arkansas with the 38-yard kick. That season he helped the team reach the 1958 Sugar Bowl and finish ranked #11. It was the only field goal of his career.

In 1958, he played running back in 3 games, carrying the ball twice for 5 yards.

His son, Fred Bednarski III also played football at Texas in 1988.

== After College ==
Bednarski joined the military and played a role in securing the integration of the University of Mississippi. He went into business, including running a grocery store for years and lived and worked in Texas. He died on 23 March 2024, at the age of 87.

== See also ==
- Mauthausen-Gusen concentration camp
- Pete Gogolak
