= Mitchell Peninsula =

Peninsula in Antarctica

Mitchell Peninsula (66°20′S 110°32′E) is a rocky peninsula, 2.5 nautical miles (5 km) long and 2 nautical miles (4 km) wide, lying between O'Brien Bay and Sparkes Bay at the east side of the Windmill Islands, Antarctica. It was first mapped from aerial photographs taken by U.S. Navy Operation Highjump in February 1947 and thought to be an island connected by a steep snow ramp to the continental ice overlying Budd Coast, though the term peninsula was considered more appropriate by the Wilkes Station party of 1957. Mitchell Peninsula was named by the Advisory Committee on Antarctic Names for Captain Ray A. Mitchell, U.S. Navy, captain of the USS Cacapon, a tanker of the western task group of Operation Highjump, Task Force 68 of 1946–47.

On its southern side is Bednarz Cove, and Drew Cove indents the west side.

== See also ==
- Harrigan Hill
