= Ignat Bednarik =

Romanian artist (1882–1963)

- Born: March 8, 1882; Orşova, Austria-Hungary
- Died: March 11, 1963 (aged 81); Bucharest, Romania
- Known for: Painting, decorative art, design, illustration
- Movement: Symbolism

Ignat Bednarik (March 8, 1882 – March 11, 1963) was a Romanian painter who worked in almost every genre of painting before devoting himself purely to watercolor. He was also interested in decorative art, design, interior decoration and book illustration. In his lifetime, he produced more than 3,000 works of art.

== Biography ==
=== Early life ===
Bednarik was born in Orschowa (Orşova), at the time part of Austria-Hungary, to Czech parents; he was son of the second marriage of Adalbert Bednarik (originally from Moravia) and Genoveva Hauschka, followed by two sisters, Genoveva, and Maria.

While a pupil at the Traian High School in Drobeta Turnu Severin, he won first prize for his works in drawing at the Tinerimea Română society.

From 1898 to 1900, Bednarik studied at the Bucharest School of Fine Arts under the sculptor and water-colourist, Ion Georgescu. In 1901, he went to Vienna where he occasionally attended classes at the Academy of Fine Arts; Bednarik preferred instead to study masterpieces in the collections of the Kunsthistorisches Museum and the Albertina.

In 1909, he married Elena Alexandrina Barabaş, also a graduate of the Bucharest School of Fine Arts. Together they left for Munich to study at the Royal School of Applied Art, at a time when the city was a dynamic international cultural centre, brimming with new ideas, in particular the influence of the Jugendstil aesthetic.

=== Symbolism ===
The Bednariks made their debut in 1910, in Paris, at the Salon d'Automne held in the Grand Palais. They returned to Bucharest in the same year. Ignat Bednarik exhibited for the first time in Romania in 1913 with Associaţia Artistică; he subsequently took part in official salons and opened his first individual exhibition in Bucharest in 1915.

His works of this period brought the influence of European symbolism to Romania at the same time as Alexandru Macedonski was exploring similar ideas in poetry. The longing for evasion, a favourite concern of symbolists, shows itself in a variety of ways in his work. A symbolic interpretation of reality, seen through the world of myths, is found in works like Saved, while the interdependence of heaven and earth is explored in When the Gods Came Down to Earth and a demythologising of fiction is attempted in End of the Legend (all 1915). The need for escape, the longing for the absolute and the desire to recreate reality in an ideal dimension can also be seen in Towards glory (1915), The Spirit Triumphs (1916), Excelsior, The Paths of Life (1922) and Æternum Vale!.

The escape into the world of legends and ancient ballads (for example, Meşterul Manole) demonstrates Bednarik's debt to Romanian folk-tales, seen particularly well in his series of illustrations for Petre Ispirescu's Tales of the Romanians (1925–1926).

Notes of nostalgia and reverie also permeate his portrait-compositions Ioana (1920), The Letter (1921) and Portrait of Mrs. M. Tomescu (1923), while his treatment of philosophical subjects, such as Towards the Styx (1916), The Enigma of Life (1919), Chimera, or To Be or Not To Be (1922), is imbued with an air of symbolic mystery.

Another kind of symbolic escape is found in the realm of fine sensations, of correspondences. The theme of music often appears in Bednarik's work, for example Young Girl Playing the Violin (1915), At the Piano (1922) and Playing the Violin (1922). Bednarik often associates music with flowers which decorate the interior where the former is being produced; at times they are so faintly sketched on the canvas as to be almost invisible (another symbolist trait). Flowers are often present in portraits of children (Mother's Birthday) and almost always in paintings of female figures (a favourite association of Art Nouveau artists), for example in Portrait of the Artist's Wife (1919), Portrait of a Young Girl (1925), or Portrait of Miss J.P. (1924). They are also seen in his interiors with nudes painted in 1921. The flower symbolism is enhanced by the choice of the blossom which accompanies the female figure. Mastering the delicate transparency of watercolour, Bednarik surrounds his sitters sometimes with lilies, but more often with roses or peonies. In his next period, from 1919 to 1928, the still life with flowers became one of his favourite subjects.

The novelty of his work lies in its symbolist conception as well as the atmosphere of deep philosophical contemplation, transposed through watercolour, which imbues his painting with such distinctive individuality.

=== Later work ===
The violence of World War I brought an abrupt halt to his heady and coloured symbolist compositions. As a member of the War Team of Artists and Sculptors set up in Iaşi by Queen Marie, during the time when Bucharest was occupied by German forces, Bednarik employed all his graphic skill in vigorous depictions of conflict and hardships.

Between 1915 and 1927, Bednarik held eight individual watercolour exhibitions in Bucharest and, in 1928, one in New York City. He also executed a series of works which were designed as an overlook of typical scenes from Romanian daily life. Towards 1947, partially recovering his sight after a period of almost total blindness, he painted a number of canvases depicting characters from old Bucharest, or scenes from Romanian history (The Execution of Gheorghe Doja, 1954). In 1956, a retrospective of the work of Ignat Bednarik was organised in Bucharest by the Union of Artists.

=== Illness and death ===
In 1961 he went completely blind. He died two years later.

== Legacy ==
Today, his works can be seen in collections and museums both in Romania and abroad, such as in the National Museum of Art of Romania, Military Museum, and National Museum of Romanian History, the Bucharest City Museum of History and Art, the library of the Romanian Academy, the Brukenthal Museum in Sibiu; also in the Albertina Collection in Vienna and in private collections in Europe, the Americas and the Middle East.

== Bibliography ==
- Beatrice Bednarik, Ignat Bednarik Album, Meridiane Publishing House, Bucharest 1987
- Beatrice Bednarik - “Ignat Bednarik, pictor și ilustrator al reginei Maria” - Revista Academica, Nr. 56-57 (193–194), Annul XVII, Noiembrie-Decembrie 2006
- Catalogul Expoziției retrospective de acuarelă și desen I. Bednarik, Editat de Uniunea Artiștilor Plastici, București, 1956/Catalog Exhibition of Ignat Bednarik Publishing House, U.A.P. Bucharest 1956.
- Petru Comarnescu, „Pictorul Bednarik”, Arta Plastică IX(1962), nr.4, p. 44.
- Victor Bilciurescu, „Pictorul Bednarik” în Lumea Ilustrată, Nr. 5, Ianuarie 29, p. 5.
- The Art Center 65-67 East 56th Street, An Exhibition of Paintings and Water Colors by Oscar Schmidt, Ignatz Bednarik and Edward Nagel. Shown under the patronage of the Royal Rumanian Legation. October 16 to November 6, 1928.
- Fulmen, „(Expoziție de Artă) Pictorul Bednarik”, în Adevărul, XXXII (1919), nr. 10994, decembrie 26, p. 2.
- Leontin Iliescu, „Un gânditor în artă: I. Bednarik ” în Universul, 38 (1919), nr. 42, decembrie 27, p. 4.
- Nicolae Tonitza, „Expozițiile: Manea, Bednarik, Lazăr, Ionescu-Doru, Savargin” în Izbânda II (1920), nr. 679 decembrie 6, p. 4.
- Constanța Zissu, „Expoziția de pictură I.Bednarik și Sofronie” în Drepturile Femeii, IV (1915), decembrie, p. 156.
- Gemaldeasstellung „Bednarik - Sofronie” în Rumanischer Lloyd, XXXII (1915), nr. 8507, decembrie 22, p. 2.
- Ignat Bednarik, în Repertoriul Graficii Românești din Secolul al XX lea, A-C, vol.I, Editat de Muzeul Național de Artă a României, București, 1978, p. 158-160
- Mircea Deac "Nudul în pictura româneacă", Ed. Monitorul Oficial, 2010, p. 132.
- Ministerul Cultelor și Artelor. Muzeul A. Simu și Casa Simu – Muzeu catalog. Fondul Anastase Simu – București 1937.
- Paul Dudea „ Ignat Bednarik. Un artist plastic polivalent ” – (115 ani de la nașterea sa), în Revista Gândirea, Sibiu, Seria Nouă nr. 5–6, VI (1997), p. 101 -102.
- Lucifer/Sigmund Maur/: (Pictură – Sculptură) „Expoziția aquarelistului I. Bednarik” în Rampa IV(1920), nr. 930, noiembrie 29, p. 2.
- Rogin, Theodor : „Ignat Bednarik - un artist uitat?” în Minimum, Tel Aviv, XII˝(1998), nr.139, octombrie, p. 77
- Ministerul Cultelor și Artelor. Muzeul A. Simu și Casa Simu – Muzeu catalog. Fondul Anastase Simu – București 1937.
- Șotropa, Adriana, ”Visuri și himere”, Editura Compania, București, 2009
- Iliescu, Leontin, „Salonul de toamnă al Cenaclului Idealist” în Universul Literar, XXXI (1915), nr. 47, noiembrie 22, p. 5.
- Iliescu, Leontin „Cenaclul Idealist” (”Un salon artistic de toamnă„), Universul Literar, XXXI (1915), nr. 42, octombrie 18, p. 6.
- Olimp Grigore Ioan: „Le Cénacle idéaliste” în L’Indepéndence Roumaine”, 38 (1915), nr. 12236, nov. 30/ dec. 13, p. 2.
