= Ion Minulescu =

Romanian poet and writer (1881–1944)

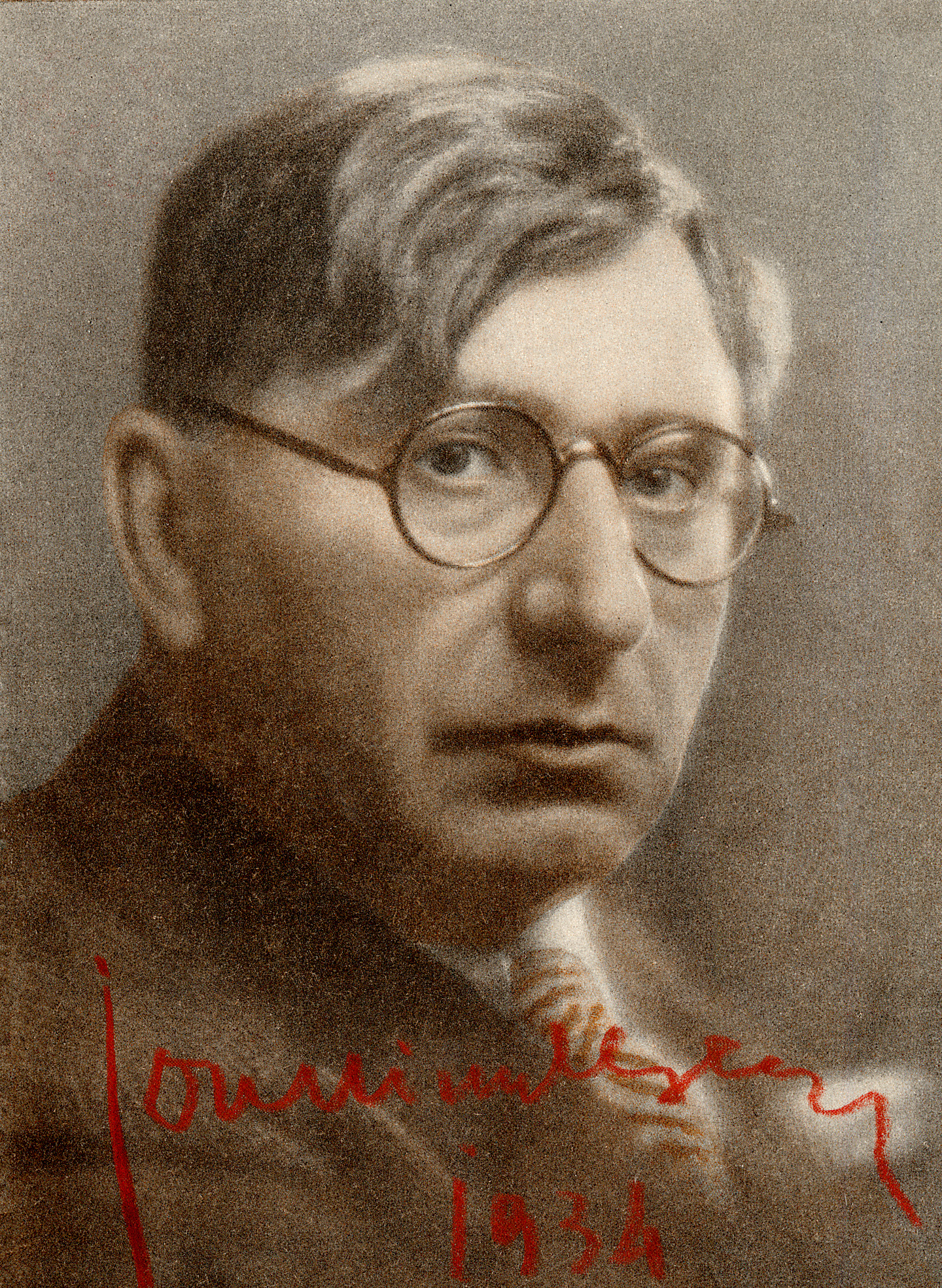
- Minulescu in 1934
- Born: January 6, 1881; Bucharest
- Died: April 11, 1944 (aged 63); Bucharest
- Occupations: poet, playwright, short story writer, novelist, literary critic, journalist, civil servant
- Writing career
- Pen name: I. M. Nirvan; Koh-i-Noor
- Period: 1904–1944
- Genres: lyric poetry, drama, memoir, satire
- Literary movement: Symbolism; Avant-garde; Sburătorul

Ion Minulescu (Romanian pronunciation: [iˈon minuˈlesku]; 6 January 1881 – 11 April 1944) was a Romanian avant-garde poet, novelist, short story writer, journalist, literary critic, and playwright. Often publishing his works under the pseudonyms I. M. Nirvan and Koh-i-Noor (the latter being derived from the famous diamond), he journeyed to Paris, where he was heavily influenced by the growing Symbolist movement and Parisian Bohemianism. A herald of Romania's own Symbolist movement, he had a major influence on local modernist literature, and was among the first local poets to use free verse.

== Biography ==
=== Early life ===
Born in Bucharest to the widow Alexandrina Ciucă (the daughter of a shoemaker in Slatina, she was 20 at the time), he was the posthumous child of Tudor Minulescu (a leather salesman who had died on New Year's Eve, probably as a result of a stroke). Originally, Minulescu was meant to be born in Slatina, but bad weather prevented his mother from leaving the capital city. Adopted by Ion Constantinescu, a Romanian Army officer who married Alexandrina Ciucă, he lived much of his childhood in Slatina and completed his primary and most of his medium studies in Pitești at Ion Brătianu High School. He was a colleague of Al. Gherghel, who would also become known as a Symbolist writer: the two edited the school magazine Luceafărul, which only published a few issues before being closed down by the headmaster.

He published his first verses in 1897, while still in high school (at the time, his attempt to publish a literary magazine was considered intolerable by his teachers). He left for Bucharest later in the same year, being signed up for a private school and completing two grades in one year.

=== Paris sojourn and return to Bucharest ===
Between 1900 and 1904, Minulescu studied law at the University of Paris, during which period he was an avid reader of Romantic and Symbolist literature (works by Gérard de Nerval, Arthur Rimbaud, Charles Baudelaire, Aloysius Bertrand, Jehan Rictus, Emil Verhaeren, Tristan Corbière, Jules Laforgue, Maurice Maeterlinck, and the Comte de Lautréamont).

At the time, Minulescu began exploring his talents as a causeur, engaging in long and entertaining conversations which were to consolidate his fame in Bucharest nightlife. He also became close to Romanian artists present in Paris — Gheorghe Petrașcu, Jean Alexandru Steriadi, Cecilia Cuțescu-Storck, and Camil Ressu, as well as to the actors Maria Ventura and Tony Bulandra. Among the key moments of his life in Paris was meeting, through the intervention of Demetrios Galanis, the poet Jean Moréas — according to Minulescu, Moréas urged him to write his poetry in French.

Upon his return, he was briefly employed by the Administration of Royal Domains in Constanța, and began cultivating relations with the local art dealer Krikor Zambaccian and the painter Nicolae Dărăscu. At the time, he drew attention to himself by wearing colorful Bohemian outfits, which included immense four-in-hand neckties and scarves he wrapped around his neck with a studied negligence (initially, he also grew a long red beard and wore large-brimmed hats).

Minulescu began publishing verses and prose in Ovid Densusianu's Vieața Nouă (a self-styled Symbolist magazine), and attended the Kübler Coffeehouse and Casa Capșa, the scene of an eclectic gathering of young poets — Alexandru Cazaban, Dimitrie Anghel, Panait Cerna, Andrei Naum, N. N. Beldiceanu, Ștefan Octavian Iosif, and Ilarie Chendi among them. Other cultural figures who came into contact with Minulescu during that period were the writers Tudor Arghezi, Liviu Rebreanu, Eugen Lovinescu, Mihail Sorbul, Gala Galaction, Mihail Sadoveanu, Emil Gârleanu, Octavian Goga, Victor Eftimiu, and Corneliu Moldovanu, the composer Alfons Castaldi, as well as the visual artists Iosif Iser, Frederic Storck, and Alexandru Satmari. Minulescu and Cazaban were to engage in a long polemic, and frequently ridiculed each other in public.

Despite having been preceded by Alexandru Macedonski's circle, Minulescu's early commitment to Symbolism and his leading presence in the grouping has led to an enduring image of him as the first true Symbolist in his country. This was notably disputed by George Călinescu, who attributed the position to Ștefan Petică, and contended that Minulescu only adopted "Symbolist settings and ceremonials". Tudor Vianu argued that Minulescu, together with Al. T. Stamatiad and N. Davidescu, represented a "Wallachian" Symbolism ("more rhetorical temperaments, displaying exoticism and a book-driven neuroticism"), as opposed to "Moldavians" such as George Bacovia and Demostene Botez ("[of] more intimate natures, cultivating the minor scales of the sentiment").

Minulescu and Anghel became close friends, and together translated pieces by various French Symbolists (among others — Albert Samain, Charles Guérin, and Henri de Régnier), which were published in Sămănătorul (they were collected in a single volume in 1935).

=== Innovative poetry and influence ===
In 1906, Minulescu began publishing the poems that would form his highly popular Romanțe pentru mai târziu ("Songs for Later On") collection, first published in 1908 and illustrated by his lifelong friend Iser. These came to the attention of Ion Luca Caragiale, who wrote back from his home in Berlin a praise of Minulescu's În oraşul cu trei sute de biserici ("In the City with Three Hundred Churches"), which he called "a priceless thing". According to Șerban Cioculescu, one of Caragiale's own satirical poems of the time, called Litanie pentru sfârșitul lumii ("A Litany for the End of the World"), was directly influenced by Minulescu's work in free verse.

He edited the short-lived magazines Revista Celor L'alți (in 1908) and Insula (in 1912), and, in 1911, began publishing theater reviews in magazines such as Rampa. Many of his other of his press contributions (notably, in Viitorul) were printed under the Koh-i-Noor signature. During the period, he began drawing inspiration from his numerous trips to Dobruja, dedicating several of his most celebrated verses to the Black Sea (according to Vianu, he was "the first one in our literature to chant the sea in song"). This trend was to inspire his former colleague Al. Gherghel, most of whose poetry was dedicated to marine themes.

At the time, he began cultivating an original style, where the traditional lyrical format was hidden by arbitrary sectioning, which gave his poetry a rhetorical feel. Minulescu was also arguably the first poet in his country to be primordially inspired by cityscapes, which, in one form or another, was to become the setting for the vast majority of his works. The influential modernist critic Eugen Lovinescu proposed that Minulescu's use of Romanian was revolutionary through its vocabulary, which broke with both the "archizing tendency of Eminescu" and the "more rural than anything language of Coșbuc". Such innovation brought Minulescu status as a major influence on younger poets, many of whom — among them Dada's founder Tristan Tzara — later moved towards more radical forms of modernism. The latter group also included George Bacovia, himself a major Symbolist poet.

His language was vivacious and abrupt, owing much to the inspiration Minulescu sought in romanzas (giving some of his lyrics an overtly sentimental and occasionally burlesque character). This last characteristic of his work was the target of criticism from Lovinescu, who argued that popularity and apparent superficiality had taken a toll on the overall artistic value, and of having discarded traditional Symbolist elitism while continuing to side with the movement. Overall, Lovinescu continued to attribute the poet the merits "of having been the herald of the Symbolist movement and, more or less, of having absorbed it".

Other of Minulescu's contemporaries, among them Davidescu, argued that the popular appeal of his poetry (which they referred to as Minulescianism), was turning into mere fashion. Speaking of another side to this trend, Vianu evidenced that, from as early as his debut novel, Minulescu had become the source of "an industry of Minulescian parody"; the writer Victor Eftimiu recalled that his first successful writing had been a piece which mocked Minulescu's poem Romanța celor trei romanțe ("The Romance of the Three Romances"), and was titled Romanța celor trei sarmale ("The Romance of the Three Sarmale").

Minulescu married the poet Claudia Millian, whom he had met at a masquerade ball in 1910, on 11 April 1914; she later gave birth to a daughter, Mioara Minulescu (who was to become a well-known artist).

Before and after the outbreak of World War I, the poet began attending the Germanophile society formed around the controversial political activist Alexandru Bogdan-Pitești (meeting regularly on Știrbey-Vodă Street, near the Cișmigiu Gardens); the sessions were also attended by, among others, N. D. Cocea, Tudor Arghezi and Gala Galaction. The Minulescu family fled to Iași after the Central Powers occupied Bucharest. It was there that he met with the young poet Barbu Fundoianu (future Benjamin Fondane), whose writing he gave support to, and whom he got acquainted with Symbolist poetry by through the means of his personal library — Fundoianu later expressed his gratitude to Minulescu by dedicating him some of his best-known early poems.

=== Interwar and later years ===
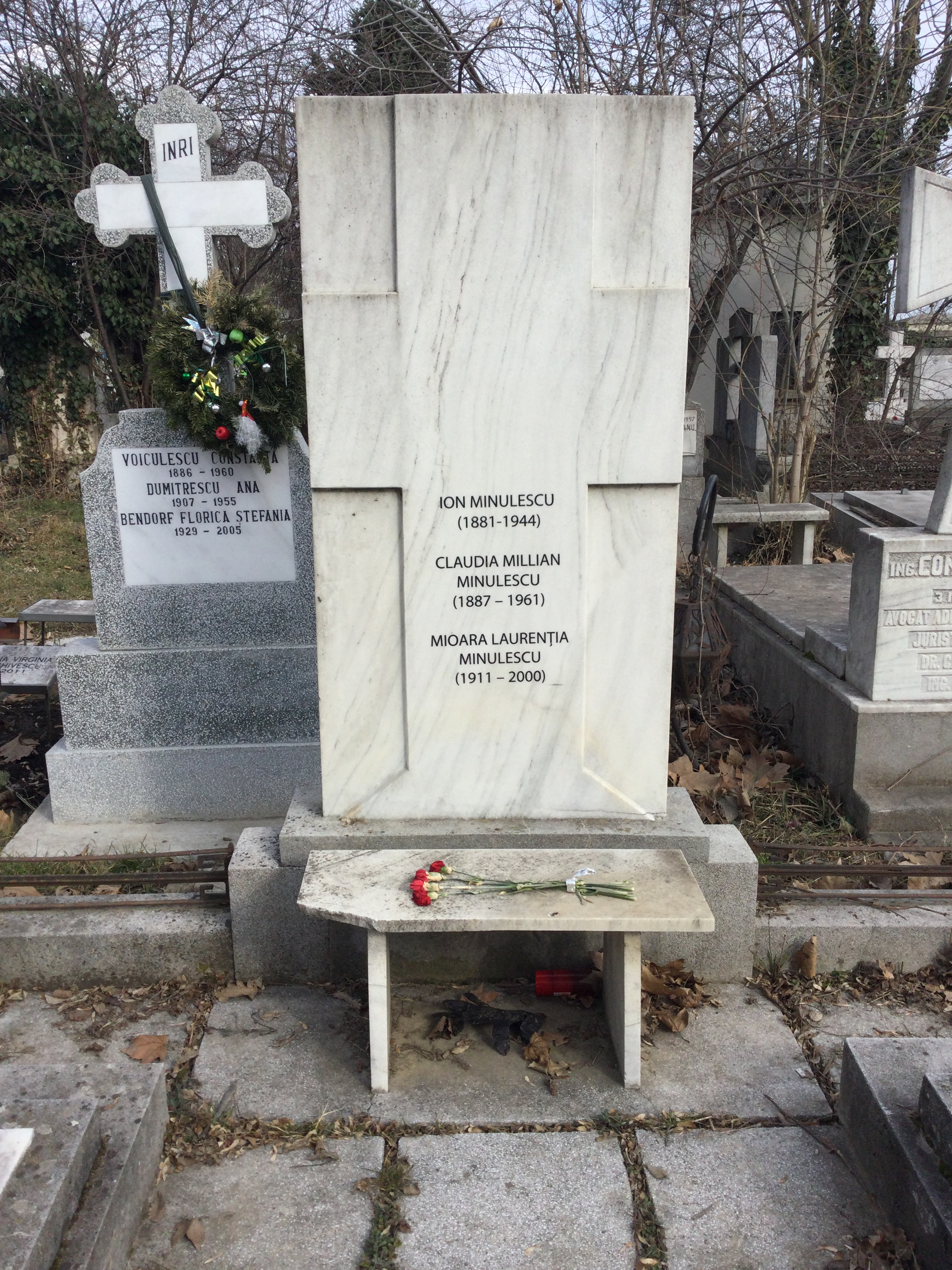
Grave in Bellu Cemetery

After 1919, he was a regular contributor to Lovinescu's Sburătorul. His pre-World War I poetry became, as he himself admitted, a real commercial success only during the 1920s, when "[Romanțe pentru mai târziu] ran through four consecutive editions"; his reputation as a dramatist was established in 1921, when two of his plays were included in the National Theatre Bucharest's season. Minulescu was head of the Art Direction inside the Ministry of Arts and Religious Cults in 1922, an office he held until 1940. For a short while during the 1930s, he was also chairman of the National Theatre.

With Krikor Zambaccian, Ștefan Dimitrescu, Nicolae Tonitza, Oscar Han and Jean Alexandru Steriadi, he was present at the major 1925 exhibit showcasing the work of painter Theodor Pallady. By then, he had come to give his endorsement to abstract art, which he promoted in his capacity as head of the official Art Salon. Zambaccian later recounted that Minulescu was the object of a 1927 farce played by the figurative artist Jean Cosmovici — the latter protested against modern art by sending the Salon jury a work which Zambaccian called "a painting without any purpose or quality", and signing it Popa Kely; after the piece was received and exhibited, Cosmovici publicized his story in the press, leaving Minulescu in an embarrassing position.

In 1924, he issued his Roșu, galben și albastru ("Red, Yellow and Blue") — a novel and political satire named after the colours of the Romanian flag), it provided a personal chronicle of the war. The book was to prove very successful after first being published in serial by Viața Românească. According to Viața Românească's Octav Botez, Roșu, galben și albastru also won acclaim from political figures of the day, and was "admired by one of the most subtle of the Romanian critics." Botez admired the liveliness and bizarre images offered by Minulescu's text, but criticized it for its "cynicism and indecency", as well as for its "deplorable spiritual void."

After a long period of concentrating on his theatrical work, Minulescu returned to poetry in 1928, with Spovedanii ("Confessions" — later included in his Strofe pentru toată lumea, "Verses for Everyone"). He also published an autobiographical novel, Corigent la limba română (Flunking in Romanian; the title was an ironic reference to the fact that, during his years in high school, his Romanian-language skills had been considered to be below standard). The book scandalized sections of the public opinion, because it minutely depicted the haphazard erotic experiences of an adolescent, and was criticized by Octav Botez for being "monotonous" and "trivial". Nevertheless, critics considered it interesting for the insight it gave into literary disputes of the early 20th century, as well as for its sarcastic comments on the traditionalist figures of the period. Also in 1928, Ion Minulescu was awarded the National Poetry Prize.

Minulescu's late works were mostly definitive collections of his earlier poetry and prose. In his very last poems, he was moving away from the exuberant forms of Symbolism, adopting instead an intimate tone. He died from a heart attack during World War II, as Bucharest was the target of a large-scale Allied bombing, and was buried in Bellu cemetery.

== Works ==
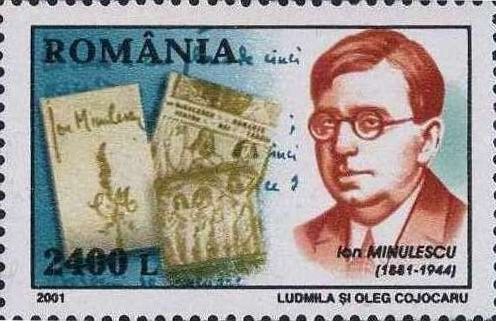
Ion Minulescu on a 2001 Romanian stamp

- Romanțe pentru mai târziu (Songs for Later On; poems, 1909)
- Casa cu geamuri portocalii (The House with Orange Windows; prose, 1908)
- De vorbă cu mine însumi (Conversing with Myself; poems, 1913)
- Măști de bronz și lampioane de porțelan (Bronze Masks and Porcelain Fairy Lights; prose, 1920)
- Pleacă berzele (The Storks Are Leaving) and Lulu Popescu – plays, 1921
- Roșu, galben și albastru (Red, Yellow and Blue; novel, 1924)
- Omul care trebuia să moară sau Ciracul lui Hegesias (The Man Who Was Supposed to Die or Hesias' Hanger-On; play, 1924)
- Manechinul sentimental (The Sentimental Mannequin; play, 1926)
- Spovedanii (Confessions; poems, 1927)
- Allegro ma non troppo (play, 1927)
- Corigent la limba română (Flunking in Romanian; novel, 1928)
- Amantul anonim (The Anonymous Lover; play, 1928)
- Strofe pentru toată lumea (Verses for Everyone; poems, 1930)
- Cetiți-le noaptea (Read Them at Nighttime; prose, 1930)
- Bărbierul regelui Midas sau Voluptatea adevărului (King Midas's Barber or The Voluptuousness of Truth; novel, 1931)
- Porumbița fără aripi (The Wingless Dove; play, 1931)
- 3 și cu Rezeda 4 (3, and with Rezeda 4; novel, 1933)
- Nevasta lui Moș Zaharia (Uncle Zaharia's Wife; play, 1937)

== Presence in English-language anthologies ==
- Testament – 400 Years of Romanian Poetry – 400 de ani de poezie românească – bilingual edition – Daniel Ioniță (editor and principal translator) with Daniel Reynaud, Adriana Paul & Eva Foster – Editura Minerva, 2019 – ISBN 978-973-21-1070-6
- Romanian Poetry from its Origins to the Present – bilingual edition English/Romanian – Daniel Ioniță (editor and principal translator) with Daniel Reynaud, Adriana Paul and Eva Foster – Australian-Romanian Academy Publishing – 2020 – ISBN 978-0-9953502-8-1 ; LCCN 2020-907831
