= Al. Gherghel =

Romanian Symbolist poet

Al. Gherghel (Romanian pronunciation: [alekˈsandru ˈɟerɟel]; April 27, 1879 — December 20, 1951) was a Romanian Symbolist poet.

== Biography ==
Born in Pitești into a family of intellectuals, his father Ion was a German teacher in Câmpulung. He spent his childhood and adolescence in the latter town, where he first began writing verse. He attended his first two years of high school at Saint Sava National College in the national capital Bucharest but completed his secondary studies in Pitești. He and Ion Minulescu, a year his junior, edited a literary magazine called Luceafărul for a short period before it was shut down by the headmaster. Entering the University of Bucharest in 1904, where he studied at the Law and Literature faculties, he studied under Titu Maiorescu and Mihail Dragomirescu, and was a classmate of Vasile Pârvan, Panait Cerna, Ion Petrovici, Oreste Georgescu and I. Dragoslav.

His debut volume, Cântece în amurg ("Songs in Twilight"), appeared in 1906. Drawn into the capital's literary circles, he became close to Alexandru Macedonski's circle as well as to that of Ovid Densusianu and his Vieața Nouă review. He would meet fellow writers at the Kübler Coffeehouse on Calea Victoriei. In March 1908, several months after finishing his studies in Bucharest, he went to Berlin to study law at Humboldt University, but soon had to return home due to lack of funds. At this point, he began a career as a bureaucrat. Passing an examination, he became a plasă administrator at Brăhășești, followed by the same post in the Iași neighborhood of Târgu Cucului and at Cotești. In September 1911, he settled in Constanţa. After teaching for a time, he devoted himself to practicing law and writing poetry, of which he published six volumes.

He died in the home of a retired Căile Ferate Române employee.
