= Aurel Băeșu =

Romanian artist

Aurel Băeşu
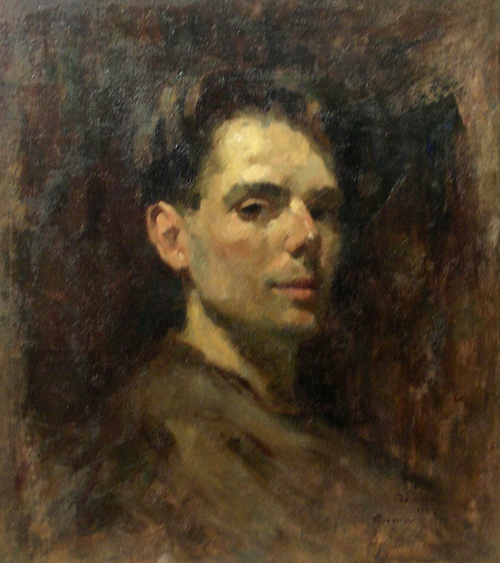
- Self-portrait (1921)
- Born: 26 May 1896; Fălticeni, Romania
- Died: 24 August 1928 (aged 32); Piatra Neamţ, Romania
- Known for: painting
- Movement: Impressionism

Aurel Băeșu (26 May 1896 – 24 August 1928) was a Romanian Impressionist landscape and portrait painter. Many of his works show the influence of Nicolae Grigorescu; an influence that was common among painters of his generation.

== Biography ==
His father was a government clerk employed by the prefecture of Suceava. He lost his mother at an early age and was raised by his grandmother.

From 1907 to 1912, he attended the "Alexandru Donici Gymnasium" in his hometown, where he displayed an aptitude for drawing. After graduating, he entered the Școala de Belle Arte in Iași, where he studied with Constantin Artachino and Gheorghe Popovici. In 1915, he received an award from the Academia Română for his portrait of the French artist Lecomte de Nöuy, who was then living in Romania.

During World War I, he was mobilized but, at the last moment, was sent to the rear, where he joined several other artists who were documenting the war. Although he escaped being wounded, the harsh conditions there led to a case of pneumonia that left him in poor health.

In an effort to improve his artistic perspectives, and with the support of members of the Academia, he went to Italy to attend a free painting course being taught at the Institute of Fine Arts in Rome. He was there from 1920 to 1922. Four years later, he travelled throughout Slovenia, Hungary and France. For many years, he was enamored of Lia Sadoveanu, the daughter of novelist Mihail Sadoveanu, but could never propose marriage because of his precarious financial situation.

In 1928, he died of tuberculosis, aged only thirty-two. A major retrospective of his work was held in 2006 at the art museum in Bacău. In 2012, his tomb was looted and destroyed. Among the items taken was a plaque by Băeșu's friend, the sculptor Mihai Onofrei.

== Selected paintings ==
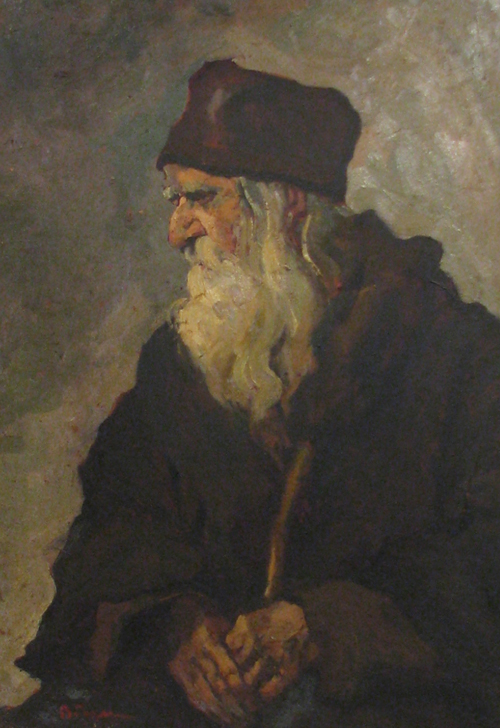
Călugărul Vlahuţă

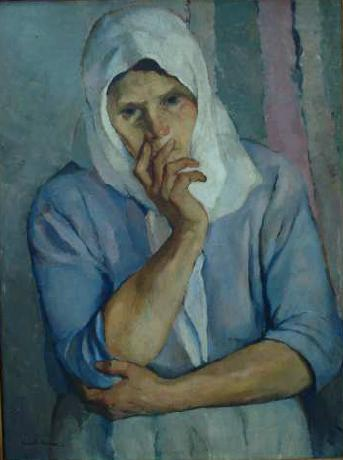
Portrait of a Peasant Woman

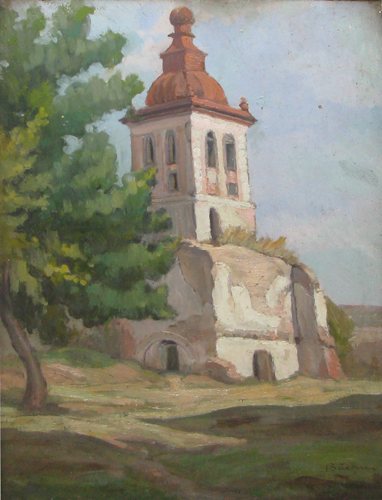
Bell Tower

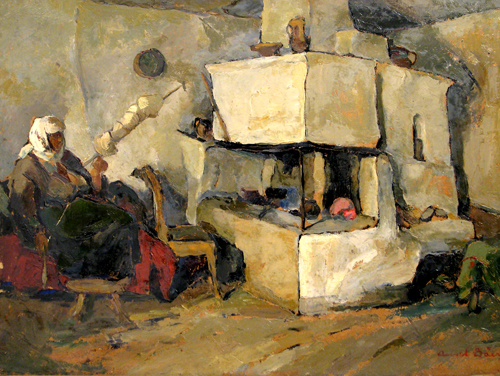
Rural Interior

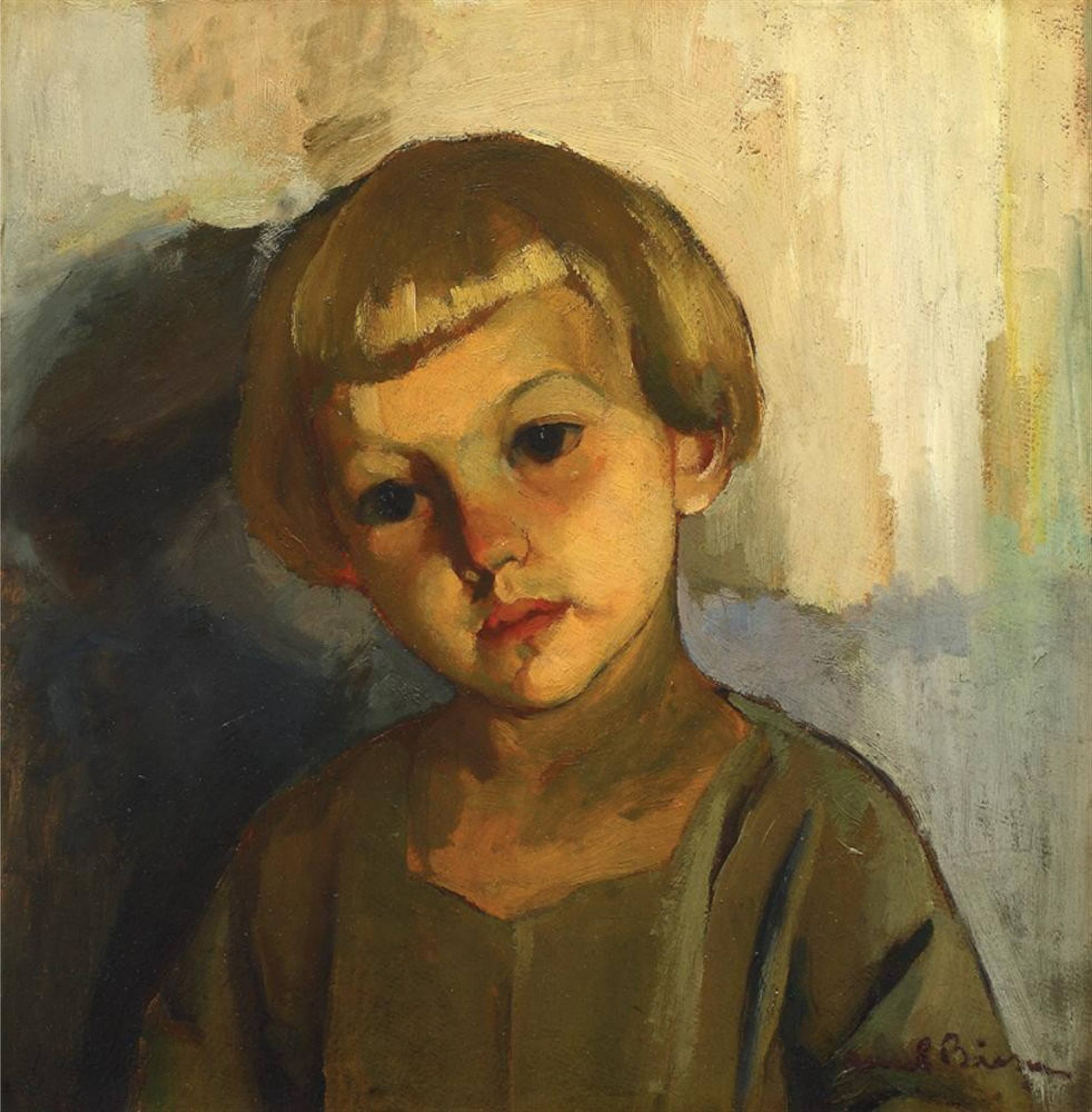
Head of a Boy
