= Monument to Ferdinand I =

Coordinates: 47°01′31″N 28°49′51″E

- Monumentul lui Ferdinand I
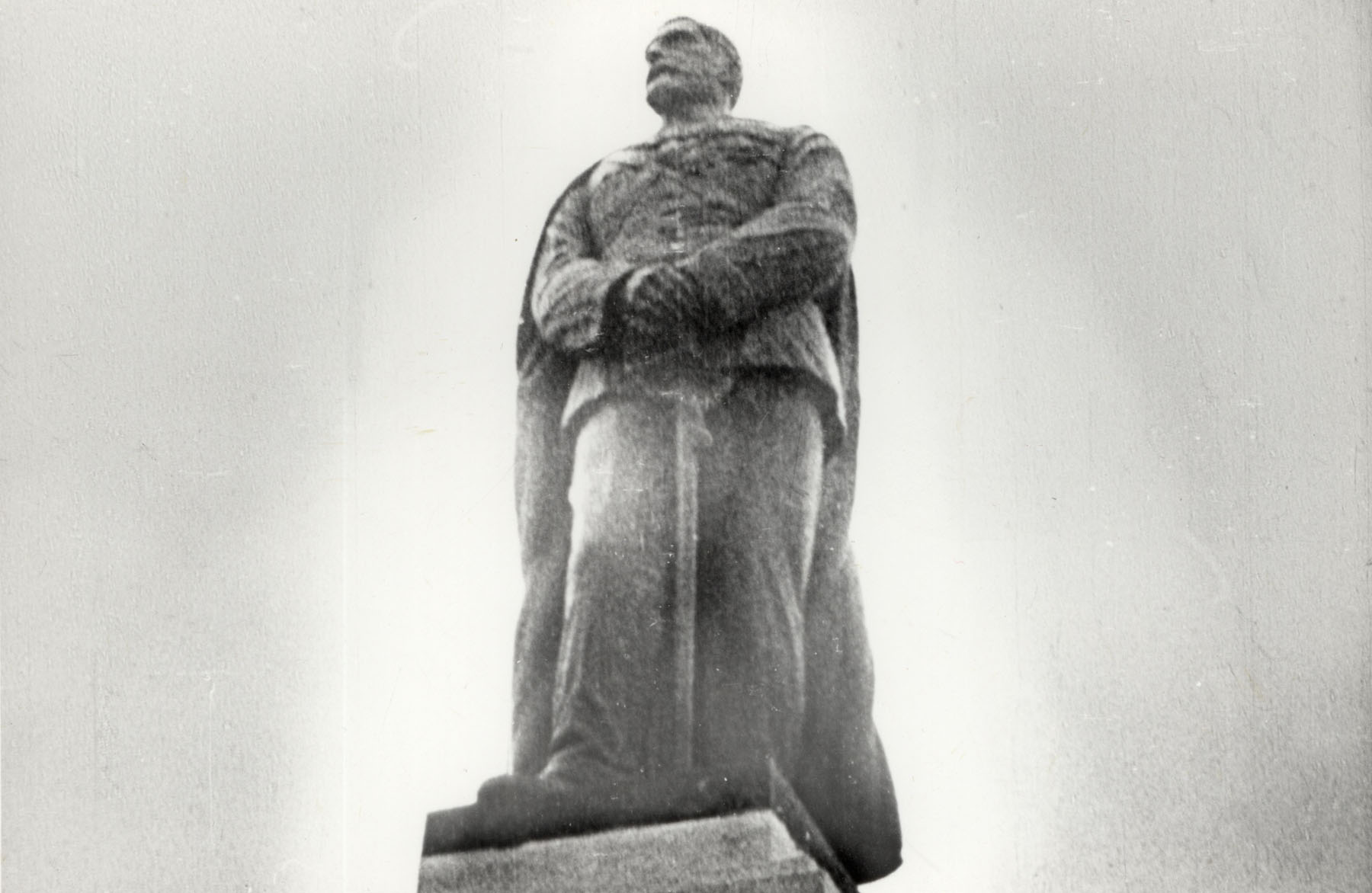
- Interactive map of Monument to Ferdinand I
- Location: Central Chişinău
- Designer: Oscar Han
- Material: bronze, stone
- Beginning date: 27 March 1938
- Completion date: 1939
- Opening date: 5 February 1939
- Dedicated to: Ferdinand I of Romania

The Monument to Ferdinand I (Romanian: Monumentul lui Ferdinand I) was a prominent monument in Chişinău, Moldova.

The building of the monument was decided at a meeting held in Chişinău on 16 January 1937 and led by Gherman Pântea and Elefterie Sinicliu.

It was located on an axis aligned with the Triumphal Arch and Chișinău Cathedral, whereby the statue of the king faced the cathedral.
