= Didești =

- Commune
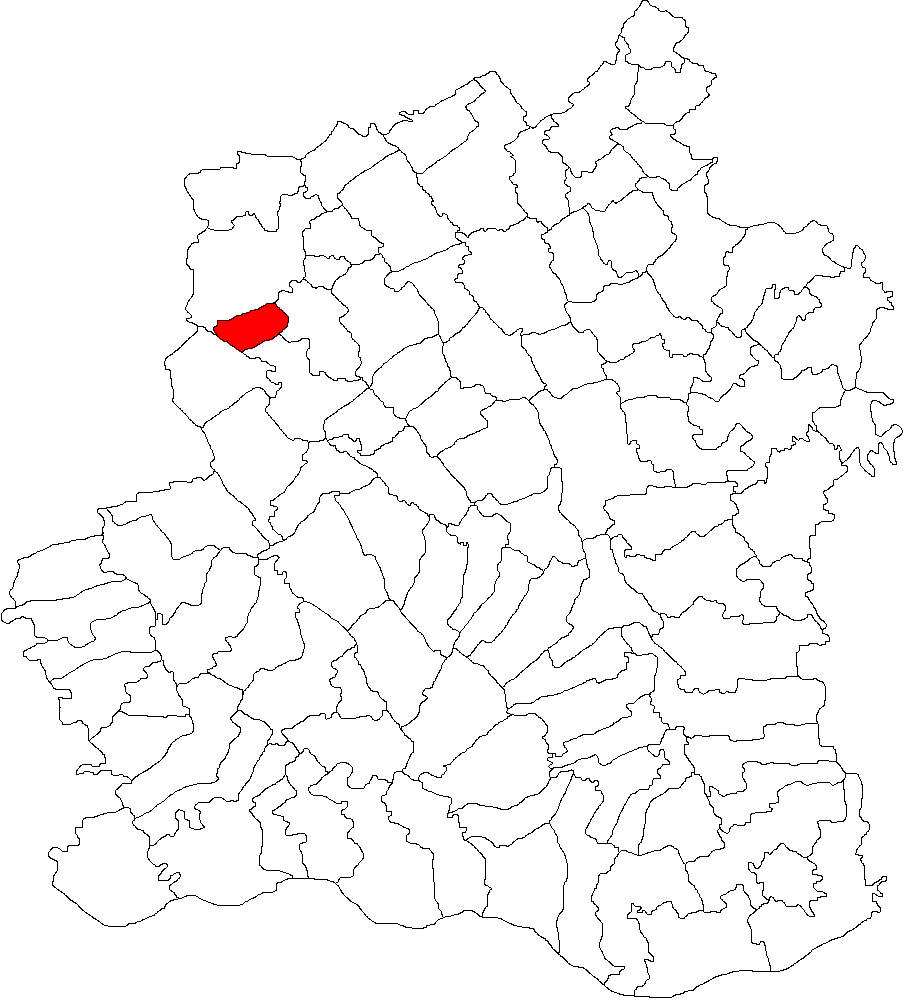
- Location in Teleorman County

- Location in Romania
- Coordinates: 44°13′N 24°53′E
- Country: Romania
- County: Teleorman
- Subdivisions: Didești, Însurăței, Satu Nou

Government
  - Mayor (2020–2024): Paul Măceacă (PNL)
- Area: 23.3 km^{2} (9.0 sq mi)
- Elevation: 106 m (348 ft)
- Population (2021-12-01): 1,134
  - Density: 49/km^{2} (130/sq mi)
- Time zone: EET/EEST (UTC+2/+3)
- Postal code: 147110
- Area code: +(40) 247
- Vehicle reg.: TR
- Website: primariadidesti.ro

Didești (Romanian pronunciation: [diˈdeʃtʲ]) is a commune in Teleorman County, Muntenia, Romania. It is composed of three villages: Didești, Însurăței, and Satu Nou.

== Natives ==
- Gala Galaction (1879–1961), writer and theologian
