= Gheorghe Popovici =

Romanian painter and designer

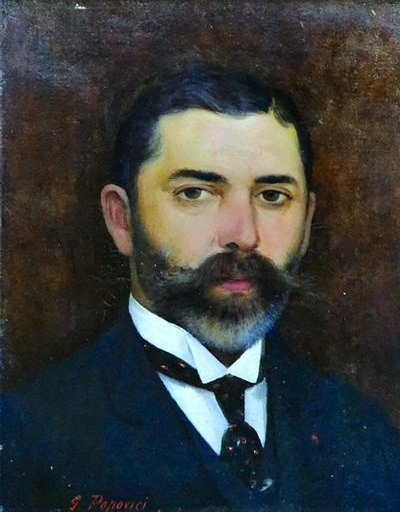
Self-portrait (1882).

Gheorghe Popovici (5 October 1859, Iași - 24 February 1933, Iași) was a Romanian painter and designer in the Academic style.

== Biography ==
He spent his childhood in Hotin, then part of the Russian Empire. Later, he attended the secondary schools in Iași, graduating from the Școala de Arte Frumoase (School of Fine Arts) in 1883. His talents earned him a state scholarship to study in Rome, then Paris, where he worked with Léon Bonnat, absorbing cultural influences as well as artistic techniques. In 1900, he won critical acclaim at the Exposition Universelle for his depiction of Horea's execution.

After returning home, he was appointed Professor of painting and composition at his old alma mater, the School of Fine Arts. From 1911 to 1929, he served as director. During his thirty years as a teacher, his students included Nicolae Tonitza, Ștefan Dimitrescu, Camil Ressu and Aurel Băeșu.

For a time, he was also Director of the school's library, which later became an art museum. During World War I, when the second shipment of the Romanian Treasure was being put together for transport to Moscow, he used the library to hide well-known art works from the local area, and they became the basis for the museum.

Overall, he preferred large oil paintings and created murals for the "Metropolitan Palace", depicting the Nicene Council and the Synod of Iași.

== Selected paintings ==
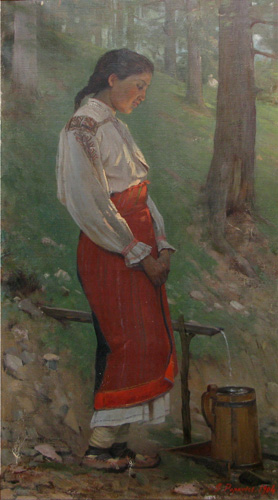
Peasant Woman in Spring

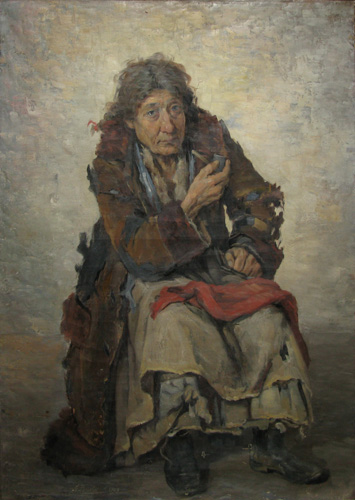
Gypsy

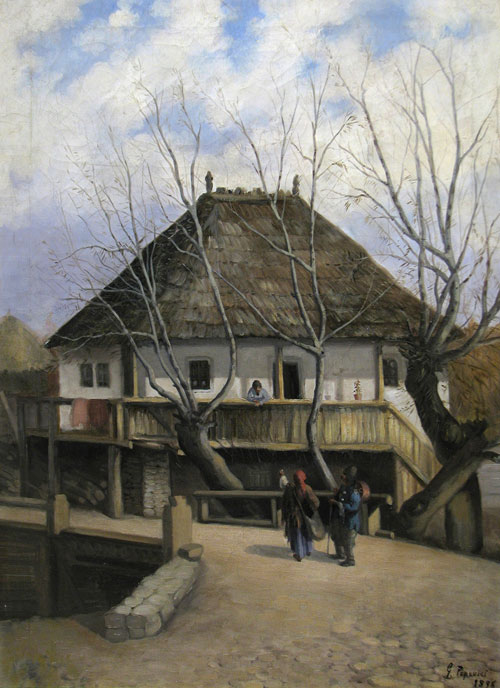
Peasant House

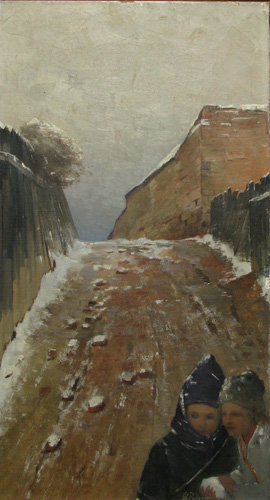
Winter

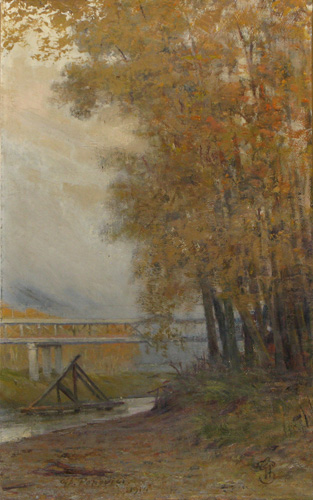
View of the Bridge Over the Moldova River
