= Francisc Șirato =

Romanian painter and graphic artist (1877–1953)

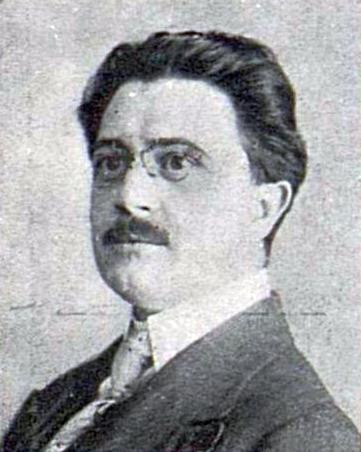
- Șirato in a photograph published in 1912
- Born: August 13, 1877; Craiova, Romania
- Died: August 4, 1953 (aged 75); Bucharest, Romanian People's Republic
- Education: Bucharest National University of Arts

Francisc Şirato (15 August 1877 — 4 August 1953) was a Romanian painter, graphic artist, art critic, and designer.

Alongside Nicolae Tonitza, Ștefan Dimitrescu, and Oscar Han, he was one of the Grupul celor patru ("Group of four"), some of the leading Romanian visual artists in the first half of the 20th century.

== Biography ==
Francisc Șirato (Sirató Ferenc) was born in 1877 in Craiova to an ethnic Hungarian family of petty craftsmen, originally from the Banat area.

His early interest in art drew him to attend the Craiova Institute of Graphic Art, where he trained as a lithographer. Initially working in the realm of graphic design, he turned to painting and began studying in Düsseldorf, Germany in 1898; however, due to financial difficulties, he was unable to enrol in painting courses, so began to make money as an engraving apprentice.

The following year, Șirato returned to Romania and enrolled at the National School of Fine Arts (Școala Națională de Arte Frumoase, now the National University of Arts) in Bucharest. During this period he contributed satirical illustrations to several magazines, including Furnica, Paravanul, and Cronica.

In 1917, Șirato was appointed custodian of the National Museum of Folk Art.

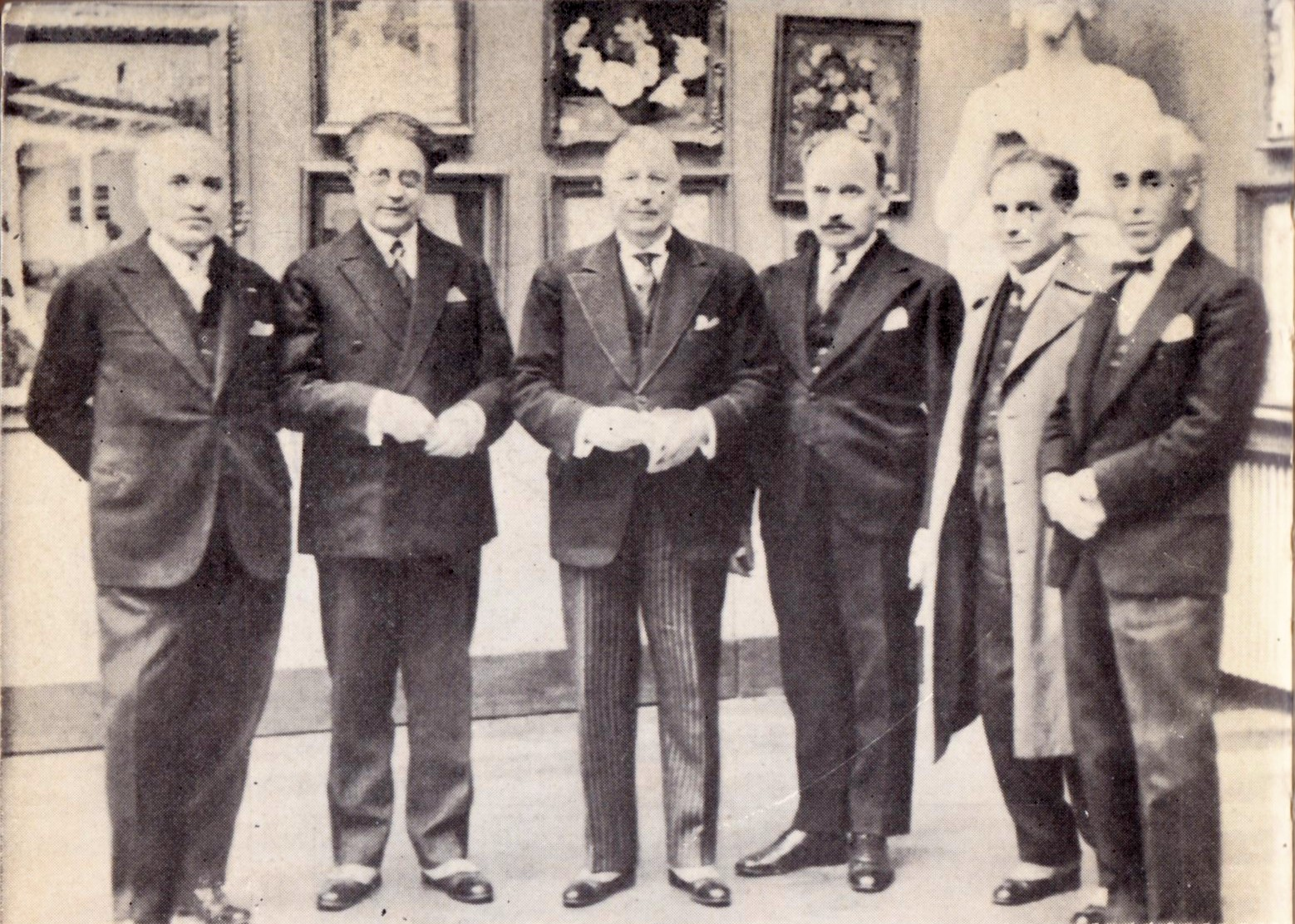
From left to right: writer Emanoil Bucuța, Francisc Șirato, ethnographer Dimitrie Gusti, Oscar Han, Nicolae Tonitza, Ștefan Dimitrescu.

He hosted his first solo show in 1921, exhibiting drawings made during (and depicting) the First World War. In the interwar period, he dedicated himself increasingly to painting, and established the "Group of four" ("Grupul celor patru") with Nicolae Tonitza, Ștefan Dimitrescu, and Oscar Han. This group, consisting of leading artists of the period, was not united by a cohesive philosophy; rather, it was a group bound mainly by friendship and collaboration.

In 1933, Șirato became a professor at the Academy of Fine Arts (his alma mater, which had been renamed in 1931).

In addition to painting and graphic design, Șirato also worked as an art critic, contributing articles to the journals Cugetul Românesc and Sburătorul. He published a monograph on the work of Nicolae Grigorescu in 1938.

Șirato died in Bucharest in 1953, at the age of 75. He is buried in the city's Lutheran Evangelical Cemetery.
