= Oscar Han =

Romanian sculptor and writer

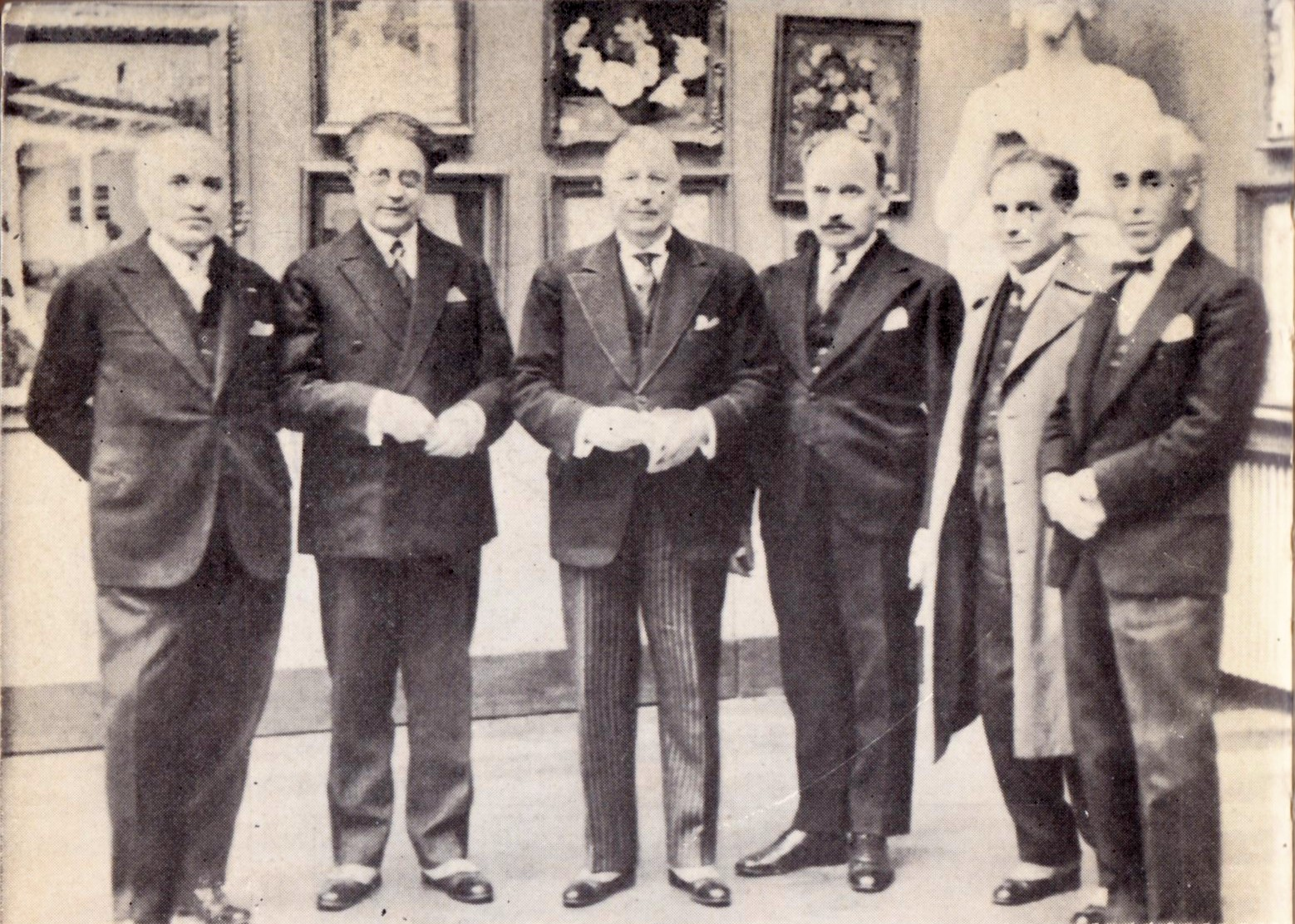
- Oscar Han (third from right), alongside Emanoil Bucuța, Francisc Șirato, Dimitrie Gusti, Nicolae Tonitza, and Ștefan Dimitrescu
- Born: December 3, 1891; Bucharest, Romania
- Died: February 14, 1976 (aged 84); Bucharest, Romania
- Education: National University of Arts
- Occupations: Sculptor

Member of the Chamber of Deputies
- In office 1934–1937

Personal details
- Party: National Liberal Party

Oscar Han (3 December 1891 – 14 February 1976) was a Romanian sculptor and writer.

== Biography ==
Han was born in Bucharest on 3 December 1891 to a father of German origin and a mother from Vrancea.

From 1909 to 1914, he studied sculpture and drawing at the Academy of Arts in Bucharest (now the National University of Arts) under Dimitrie Paciurea and Frederick Storck. He made his debut in 1911 with the sculpture "Bust of a Girl". Later, Han would return to his alma mater as a professor of sculpture, a post he occupied from 1927 to 1944, and again in 1956.

During the First World War, Han was one of several artists commissioned to create works commemorating Romania's armed forces.

In the interwar period, he formed the Group of Four ("Grupul celor patru") artists' collective together with painters Nicolae Tonitza, Francisc Șirato and Ștefan Dimitrescu. Not defined by a strict artistic philosophy, the Group of Four was bound mainly by friendship and collaboration.

Han was also politically active. Briefly associated with Nichifor Crainic's right-wing journal Gândirea, Han would later write for Pamfil Șeicaru's Curentul as a cultural critic and polemicist. He served as deputy for the National Liberal Party in Mureș from 1934-1937.

Han was accused of Freemasonry in December 1940 by the new National Legionary State (a fascist government led by the Iron Guard and Ion Antonescu). He denied these charges, but resigned from the government's Fine Arts Union.

After the Second World War, Han was briefly barred from working due to accusations of sympathy towards the Iron Guard (an accusation possibly exacerbated by a bust he sculpted in 1928 of Iron Guard philosopher Nae Ionescu). However, Han was quickly rehabilitated, and was awarded a number of distinctions by the new communist regime, including the titles "Master Emeritus of Art" (1961), "First Class Order of Labour" (1971), and "Star of the Socialist Republic of Romania" (1972).

== Works ==
Han is mainly known for his statues and busts of Romanian historical figures. His portraits include the Monument to Ferdinand I in Chișinău (now in the Republic of Moldova), several busts of famous authors in Bucharest's Herăstrău Park (including William Shakespeare and Alexandru Vlahuță), the monuments to Mihai Eminescu in Cluj-Napoca, Constanța, and Oradea, the statue of Anghel Saligny in Constanța, the monument to Mircea the Elder in Turnu Măgurele, and the monument to Michael the Brave in Alba Iulia.

His works were exhibited mainly in Bucharest, but also at Romanian art exhibitions and international exhibitions in other European cities.

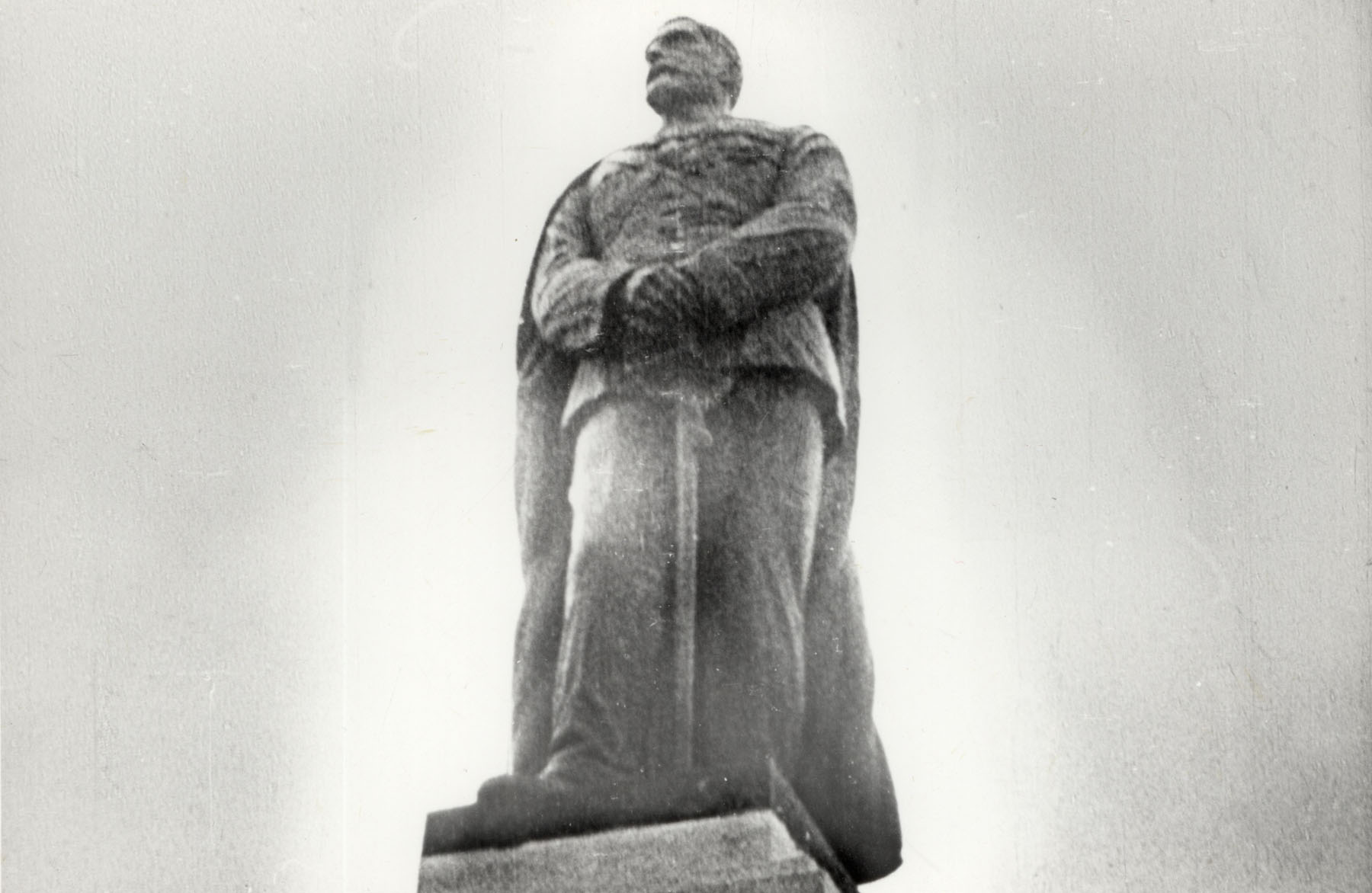
Monument to Ferdinand I in Chișinău (1939)
