= Gala Galaction =

Romanian writer, journalist, translator, theologist, orthodox priest (1879–1961)

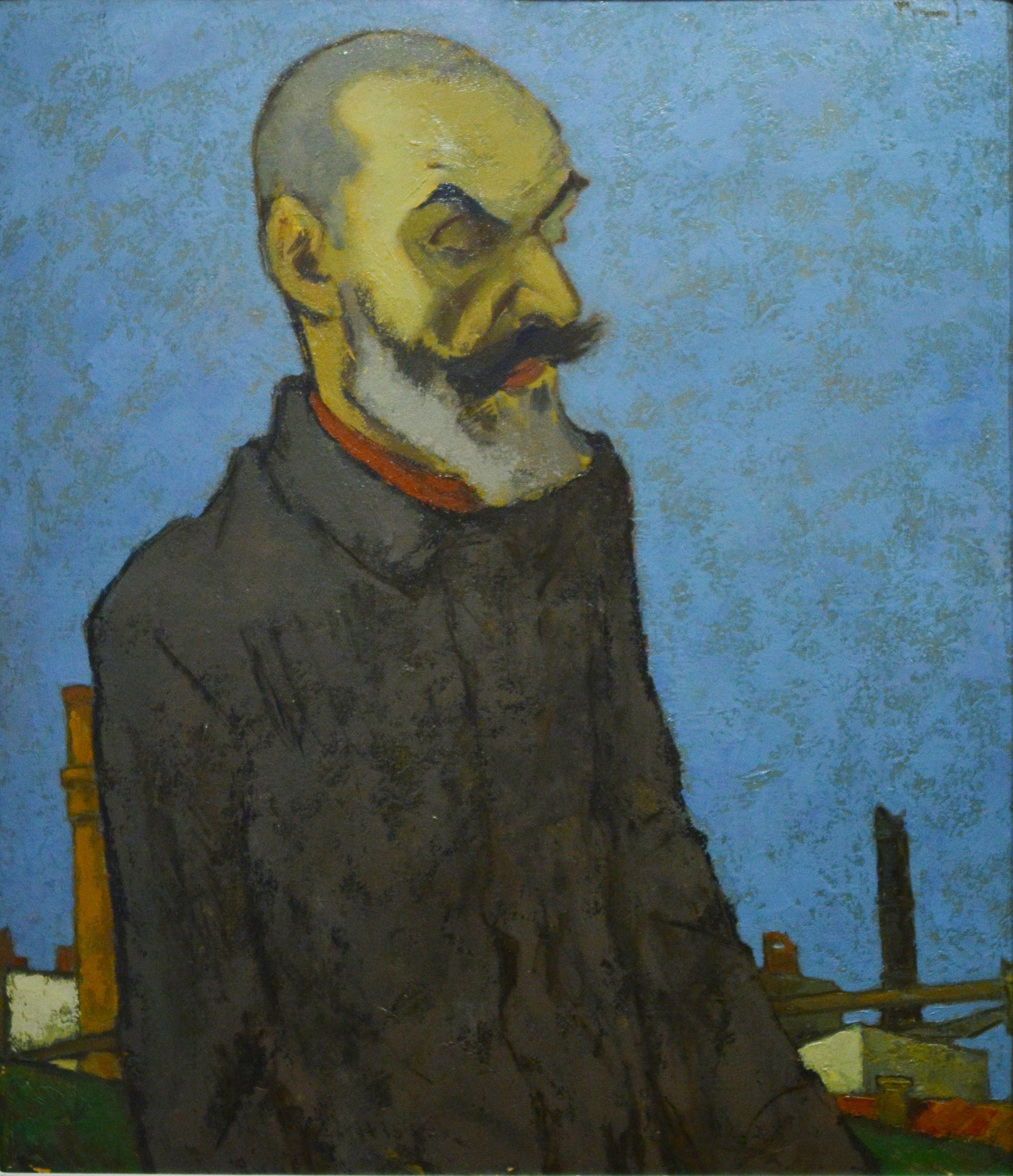
- Omul unei lumi noi ("The Man of a New World"), a 1920 portrait of Gala Galaction by Nicolae Tonitza
- Born: April 16, 1879; Didești, Romania
- Died: March 8, 1961 (aged 81); Bucharest
- Resting place: Cernica Monastery
- Education: University of Bucharest; University of Czernowitz
- Occupations: priest, theologian, short story writer, novelist, dramatist, essayist, journalist, translator, diarist
- Writing career
- Period: 1900–1961
- Genres: fiction, fantasy, travel literature, biography
- Subject: Christian theology
- Literary movement: Realism; Poporanism; Sămănătorul

Gala Galaction (Romanian pronunciation: [ˈgala galaktiˈon]; the pen name of Grigore or Grigorie Pișculescu [ɡriˈɡor(i)e piʃkuˈlesku]; April 16, 1879 – March 8, 1961) was a Romanian Orthodox clergyman, theologian, writer, journalist, left-wing activist, as well as a political figure of the People's Republic of Romania. Contrary to political trends in interwar and WWII Romania, he was a promoter of tolerance towards the Jewish minority.

== Biography ==
=== Early life ===
Gala Galaction was born in the village of Didești, Teleorman County, the son of a wealthy peasant and a priest's daughter. His father had traveled throughout the Balkans on business, and had settled in Didești as an estate lessee.

After completing his primary studies in his native village and in Roșiorii de Vede (1888–1890), Galaction went on to study at the Saint Sava National College in Bucharest (1890–1898), and, after a period of studying philosophy at the University of Bucharest, took a degree in Theology at Czernowitz University (now Chernivtsi University in Ukraine). During his studies, he began to take an interest in literature, and was briefly influenced by the ideas of Sâr Péladan, a French occultist and poet.

Galaction made his literary debut in 1900 with the novella Moara lui Călifar ("Călifar's mill"), a sinister story on the subject of demonic temptation. His growing interest in Orthodoxy led him to abandon literature for the following ten years. After returning to writing, in 1914 his volume of collected stories, La Vulturi! ("To the vultures!") was awarded the Romanian Academy prize.

=== Early 1900s activism ===
Having spent his early years a disciple of the Marxist philosopher Constantin Dobrogeanu-Gherea, he became associated with Poporanism (an interwar left-wing nationalist political current) and, like his close friend N. D. Cocea, socialism. These tendencies established him as a leading figure on the Romanian left. According to literary critic Tudor Vianu, writing in the communist era:

"The attraction towards socialism during Galaction's youth was always confessed and never was disavowed, although his religious outlook on life, formulated through the influence of his family and his immediate environment, led him to see socialists as fellow travellers rather than comrades in battle."

Noted for his criticism of the violent repression of the Romanian Peasants' Revolt in 1907, Galaction soon became an active journalist. With the help of author Tudor Arghezi, he edited the journals Cronica and Spicul, which appeared during World War I (between 1915 and 1918). Like Arghezi, he displayed sympathy for the Central Powers, and collaborated with the authorities in Bucharest under German occupation. Eventually, Galaction would welcome the new political mood established by the Russian Revolution, including the increasing visibility of Romania's Socialist Party and a series of labour strikes in 1918–1919:

"We witnessed with our own eyes how the old worlds are crumbling and how the new ones are born. And it seems to me that the spectacle is at its most interesting as seen from our little Romanian island. [...] The power of the many, let loose all around us, is rising, is fretting, is roaring and is looking for a new balance. Let us not delude ourselves by thinking we could ever see it return to its previous mould. It would be absurd."

Around the same time, he became an enthusiastic advocate of the local labour movement. A public meeting of factory workers left a lasting impression on him:

"Out of the smouldering and mud-covered suburbs, out of the humid and suffocating basements, out of the thousands of too-small cells, where the proletarian bee distills the honey of capitalist drones, out of all places high and low, the working people had come in black flocks in order to increase, standing shoulder to shoulder, the phalanx of socialist demands."

Soon after the First World War, Galaction befriended Nicolae Tonitza, a painter and illustrator of socialist newspapers, who would design the cover of Galaction's collection of essays O lume nouă ("A new world") and would paint his portrait (titled "The Man of a New World"). In his memoirs, the art collector Krikor Zambaccian described the portrait:

"[...] that hallucinatory portrait [...]. On a background of intense blue is profiled the mage-like figure of the writer Galaction; on the most distant plane emerge the silhouettes of industries, and rise the chimneys of factories."

=== Interwar period ===
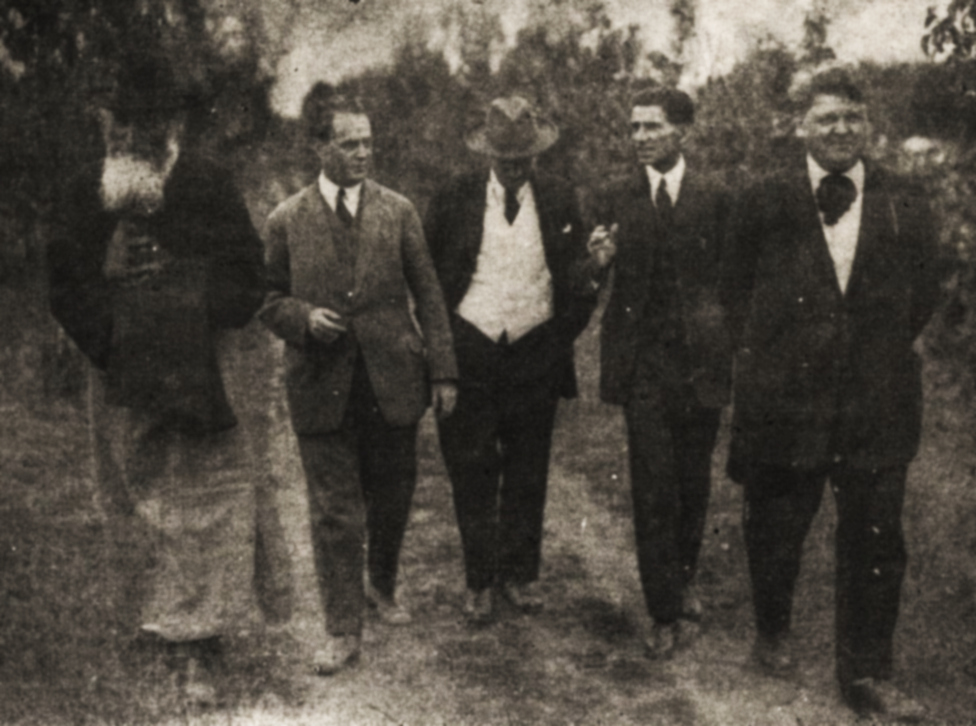
Left to right: Gala Galaction, I. Rosenthal, D. D. Pătrășcanu, Panait Istrati and Mihail Sadoveanu.

In 1922, Galaction was anointed to the priesthood, and in 1926 he became Professor of Theology and New Testament Studies at the Chişinău University's School of Theology. He was dean of the School between 1928 and 1930.

Together with priest Vasile Radu, Galaction worked on a new translation of the Bible into modern Romanian. The work, published in 1938, was meant as a newer and more accurate version to replace the traditional Cantacuzino Bible. Critic Tudor Vianu wrote:

"[...] the new translation, accomplished through the means created by newer literary evolution and with the talent of a modern poet, presents a major philological and artistic interest."

During the interwar period, Galaction was also the author of several studies, articles and commentaries on the New Testament, as well as completing a celebrated translation of William Shakespeare's The Merchant of Venice. He contributed regularly to the literary magazine Viața Românească and to the newspaper Adevărul. He also contributed to the political-literary journal Sămănătorul, but was on exceptionally bad terms with the latter's founder, Nicolae Iorga.

In 1936, Galaction was denounced for "communist activities" and alleged links with the Communist International (Comintern), which he dismissed as slander. Nevertheless, in 1938–1940, like other figures of the Poporanist and socialist left (among them Armand Călinescu, Petre Andrei, Mihai Ralea, Ioan Flueraș, and Mihail Ghelmegeanu), he collaborated with the fascist-inspired corporatist regime of King Carol II, the National Renaissance Front, which was created to undercut the growing influence of the fascist and antisemitic Iron Guard. Upon the invasion of Poland and subsequent outbreak of World War II, Galaction wrote:

"The war has begun. Hitler, the monster or the demigod, the lever of destiny or the Devil's puppet, has again raised the banner of death amid the borders of peoples. Is he the forerunner and the prophet of better times, or the strix of downfalls and irremediable disasters? Are the Germans fighting for a better future, or for the narthex of barbarity and for the death of Europe? This is yet another pathetic scrutiny! Christian peoples turn their backs on the Calvary, disavow the laws of their upbringing and mock the Nine Joys! The de-Christianized Germans and the Roman Catholic Poles are equally vainglorious and lacking in Christian spirit."

=== 1940s ===
The fall of Carol's rule and the establishment of the Iron Guard's National Legionary State saw Galaction's retreat from public life, which continued after the Legionnaires' Rebellion (the attempted coup which signalled the fall of the Iron Guard) and the onset of Ion Antonescu's Nazi-aligned dictatorship. In 1944, after the overthrow of Antonescu during the August 23 coup, which saw Romania switch sides from the Axis and to the Allies, Galaction expressed his enthusiasm:

"The long-awaited hour has arrived during a night when our hearts were being extinguished by fear and our houses were falling apart... It has arrived after traveling a long way, passing amongst ruins, tombs, and smoke-covered towers... It is here!... Become an epoch, become a century, you long-awaited hour!"

Soon after, Galaction began collaborating with the Romanian Communist Party and its various front organizations. In 1947, he replaced the far-right Nichifor Crainic as a member of the Romanian Academy, and was elected vice-president of the Writers' Union in the same year. Galaction was himself purged from the Academy later in the same year, but readmitted as an honorary member in 1948. Decorated several times, he was also elected to the Parliament of Romania (1946–1948), and to its successor, the Great National Assembly (1948–1952).

=== Final years ===
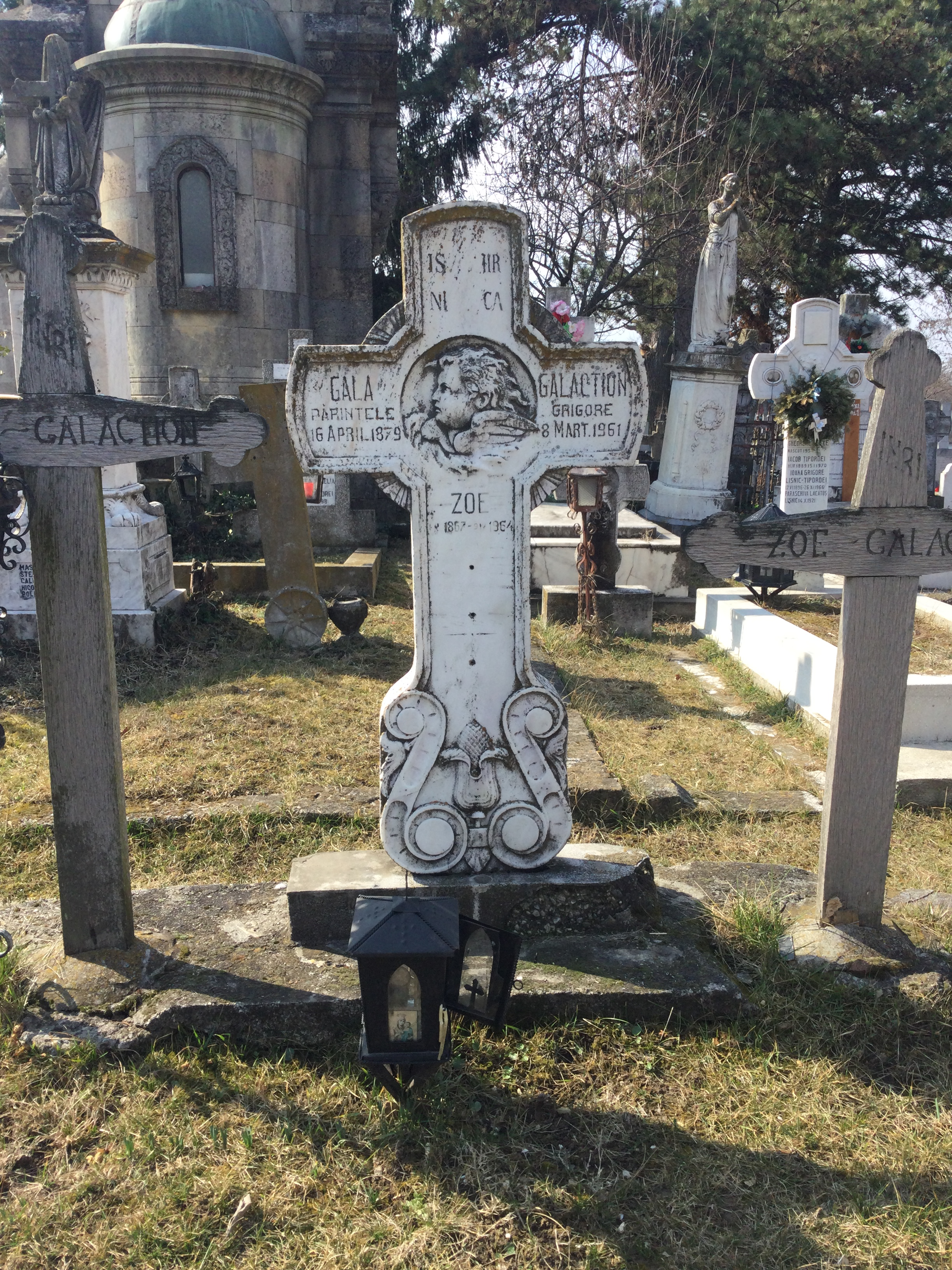
Grave at Cernica Monastery

One of the last causes he was involved in was the peace movement, with the intention of helping in the creation of a "supreme areopagus of peace" in the context of the Cold War. He was bedridden for the final years of his life due to a stroke; this probably accounted for the scarcity in criticism aimed at him during the Zhdanovist campaign in Romania.

Selections from his diary were published two decades after his death, during the Nicolae Ceaușescu era. Newer editions contain the previously-censored discourse of an embittered Galaction, who had become heavily critical of Stalinism, while reviewing his own beliefs in an "Evangelical and cloud-like" socialism.

Galaction was also noted for the support he gave to Constantin Galeriu, who later became a celebrated priest and theologian. Galeriu, who had been one of Galaction's favourite students, was rescued by the latter in 1952 after he was arrested and imprisoned at the Danube-Black Sea Canal. Galaction successfully called on Prime Minister Petru Groza to intervene in his favour.

== Personal life ==
Galaction had four daughters: Maria (or Mărioara) was married to Șerban Țuculescu, the brother of painter Ion Țuculescu in 1936; another daughter was the actress Elena Galaction Stănciulescu, and the other two, Magdalena and Lucreția, married Italian citizens — the husband of Luki Galaction (Galaction Passarelli or Galaction Sciarra), who was a painter and a writer, was Domenico Sciarra, a prominent figure of the Fascist regime (whom Gala Galaction visited in Rome at the time of his denunciation).

A friend of Communist politician Lucrețiu Pătrășcanu, Galaction helped his Jewish wife Herta Schwamen avoid antisemitic measures enforced in 1938 by the National Christian Party government, baptizing her Romanian Orthodox (she consequently took the Christian name Elena).

Galaction was a lifelong friend of the journalist Vasile Demetrius, whom he first collaborated with during the 1910s. He was also close to Vasile's daughter, the novelist and actress Lucia Demetrius, who expressed her gratitude for the moral support he gave her family after Vasile Demetrius died.

== Relationship with the Jewish community ==
Galaction published articles in several Romanian-Jewish periodicals, such as Mântuirea (1919–1922), Lumea Evree (1919–1920), Știri din Lumea Evreiască (1924–1925) and Adam (1929–1939).

His contributions were later collected in the volume Sionismul la Prieteni ("Zionism among Friends"), published in 1919. Alongside his praise for Theodor Herzl, whom he considered "the greatest Israelite in the modern world", he wrote:

"Whoever reads and loves the Bible cannot hate Israel."

In 1930, he was a pilgrim to Jerusalem, visiting the British Mandate of Palestine together with his lifelong friend and brother-in-law of his daughter, the painter Ion Ţuculescu, and both their families. Reviewing his travel memoir În pământul făgăduinței ("In the Promised Land"), Alexandru A. Philippide, a fellow writer at Viața Românească, thought that Galaction's attitude was linked to both his own theological outlook on tolerance and the branch of Christianity he represented:

"[A] tolerant character is, after all, what sets Orthodoxy apart. Father Galaction turns this into his point of honor. On the same ship as him there were many Jewish immigrants, setting for Palestine. «Brave soldiers of such a passionate and sacrifice-eager ideal!» exclaims Father Galaction. That is, indeed, an exclamation that goes beyond faith (or, in any case, stems from plaits of the soul other than faith)."

In late 1947, Galaction welcomed the more decisive steps taken towards the creation of Israel. Nowadays, in remembrance of his role, a square in Jerusalem bears his name.

== Selected literary works ==
Cover of Roxana (1930).

- Bisericuța din Răzoare. Nuvele și schițe ("The Small Church in Răzoare. Short Stories and Literary Sketches"), 1914
- Eminescu ("The Life of Mihai Eminescu"), 1914
- Clopotele din mănăstirea Neamțu ("Bells of the Neamț Monastery"), 1916
- La țărmul mărei (Reverii. Note) ("On the Seashore. Reveries and Notes"), 1916
- O lume nouă. Articole ("A New World. Articles"), 1919
- Răboj pe bradul verde ("Tally on Green-Wooded Fir"), 1920
- Toamne de odinioară ("Bygone Autumns"), 1924
- De la noi la Cladova ("From Us to Cladova"), 1924
- Caligraful Terțiu. Adevăr și închipuire ("Terțiu the Calligrapher. Truth and Make-belief"), 1929
- Roxana. Roman ("Roxana. A Novel"), 1930
- Papucii lui Mahmud. Roman ("Mahmud's Slippers. A Novel"), 1931
- Doctorul Taifun. Roman ("Doctor Typhoon. A Novel"), 1933
- La răspântie de veacuri. Roman ("At the Crossroads of Centuries. A Novel"), 2 vol., 1935
- Rița Crăița. Fantezie dramatică în trei acte ("Rița Crăița. Fantasy Drama in Three Acts"), 1942
- În grădinile Sf. Antonie ("In Saint Anthony's Gardens"), 1942
- Vlahuță ("The Life of Alexandru Vlahuță"), 1944
- Mangalia, 1947
