= Ștefan Dimitrescu =

Romanian Post-impressionist painter and draftsman

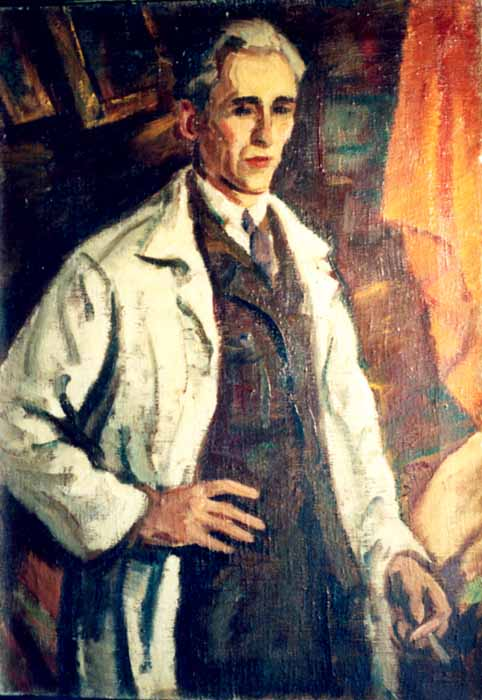
- Self portrait
- Born: January 18, 1886; Huși, Romania
- Died: May 22, 1933 (aged 47); Iași, Romania
- Education: Gheorghe Popovici, Emanoil Bardasare
- Known for: Painting, drawing
- Movement: Post-Impressionism

Ștefan Dimitrescu (January 18, 1886 – May 22, 1933) was a Romanian Post-impressionist painter and draftsman.

== Biography ==
Born in Huși into a modest family, he completed his primary and secondary studies in his hometown. In 1903, deciding to follow his passion for music, he left for Iași, where he took cello classes at the Iași Conservatory.

In summer of 1903, Dimitrescu entered the National School of Fine Arts in the city, studying in the same class as Nicolae Tonitza; the two studied under Gheorghe Popovici and Emanoil Bardasare. After graduation, Dimitrescu painted murals for the Orthodox churches in Agăș and Asău (Bacău County). Between 1912 and 1913, he studied in Paris, at the Académie de la Grande Chaumière, during which time he was attracted to Impressionism.

Drafted into the Romanian Army at the start of the Romanian Campaign of World War I, Dimitrescu was profoundly touched by the experience, and began painting tragic pieces that documented the misery brought by the conflict. Like his friend Tonitza, he began exploring social themes, such as queuing and the effects of bombardments.

In 1917, along with the painters Camil Ressu, Iosif Iser, Marius Bunescu and the sculptors Dimitrie Paciurea, Cornel Medrea, Ion Jalea and Oscar Han, he founded the Art of Romania association in their Iași refuge. In 1926, Dimitrescu, with Oscar Han, Francisc Șirato, and Nicolae Tonitza, established Grupul celor patru ("The Group of Four").

He became a teacher at the Iași National School of Fine Arts in 1927, and, during the next year, he was named its headmaster (a position he held until his death). Towards the end of his life, Dimitrescu began expanding his palette to cover more somber colors, while exploring compositions in which the background was stripped of details and usually of a dominant white.

He died in Iași and he was buried at the Eternitatea Cemetery.

== Art ==
Most of Dimitrescu's paintings take inspiration mainly from the life of simple folk, and especially from that of Romanian peasants and miners; they attempt to portray Romanian traditions and way of life, drawing on his encounters with both Byzantine art and the work of Paul Cézanne.

Part of his art (between 1926 and 1933) was inspired by his travels to Dobruja, and have been considered to be the most accomplished synthesis between his craft as a draftsman and his art as a painter.

Many of his works are exhibited in Bârlad (at the Vasile Pârvan Museum), Bucharest (the National Museum of Art of Romania and the Zambaccian Museum), Cluj-Napoca (Cluj Art Museum) and in private collections outside Romania (in Austria, Belgium, France and Germany).

== Gallery ==
Click on an image to view it enlarged.

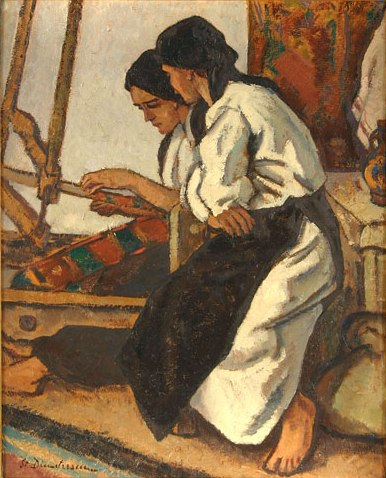
Peasant women working at a loom

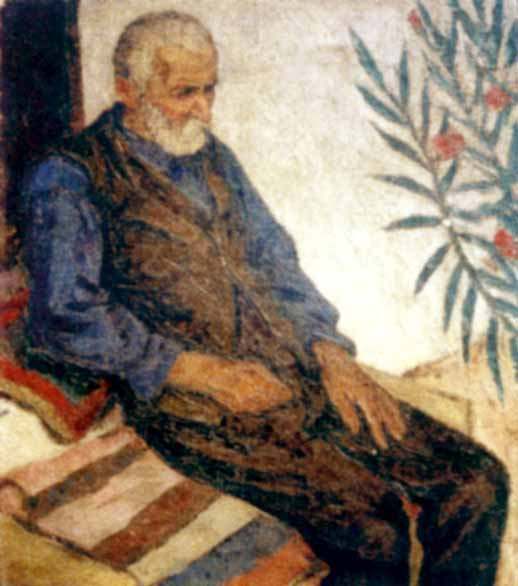
The grandfather

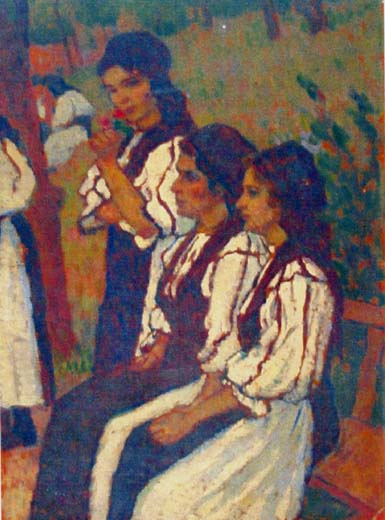
Peasant women from Sălişte

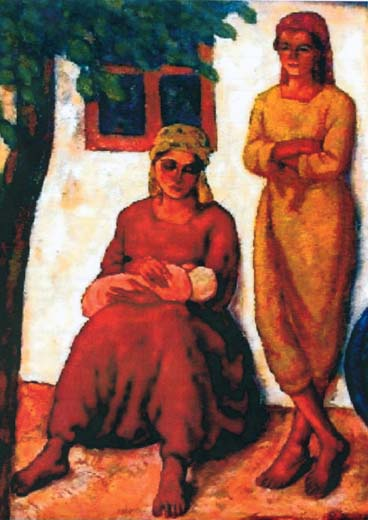
Gypsies from Dobruja (1927)

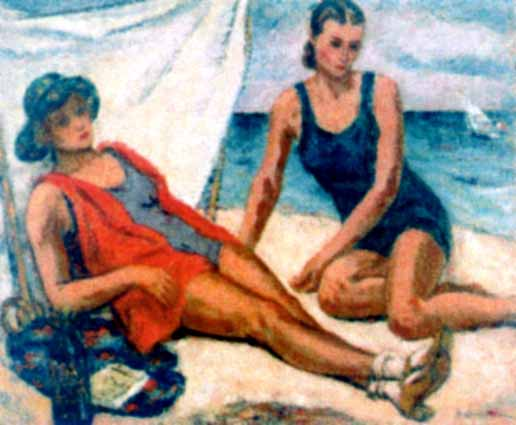
Women on the beach

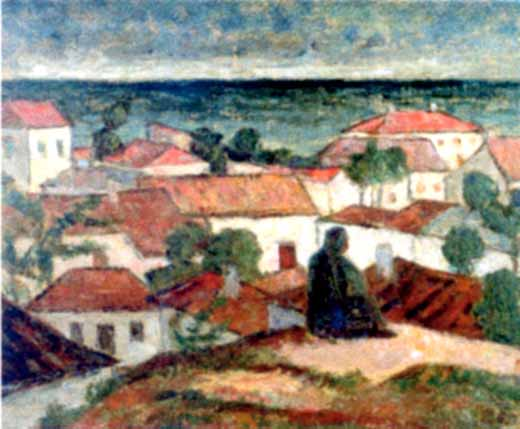
Landscape from Mangalia

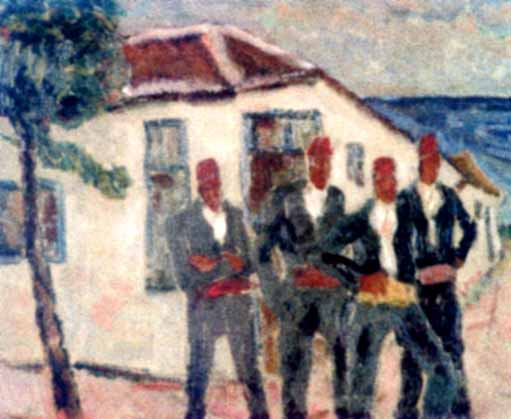
Turks in Mangalia

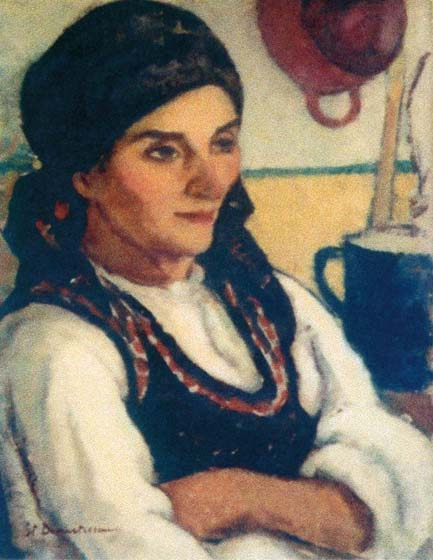
The cook (1926)
