= Nicolae Tonitza =

Romanian painter, engraver, lithographer, journalist and art critic

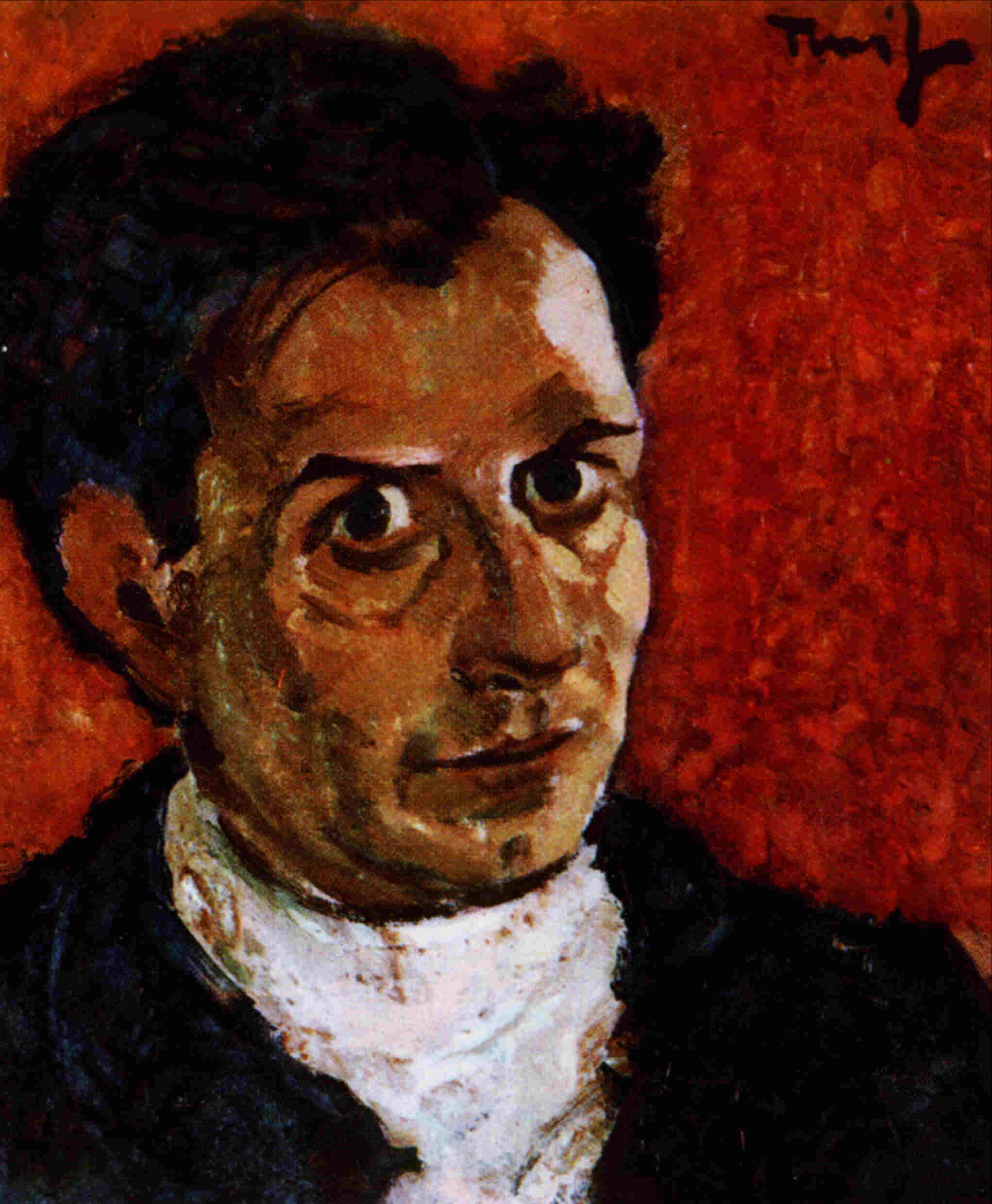
- Self-portrait (ca. 1923)
- Born: April 13, 1886; Bârlad, Kingdom of Romania
- Died: February 27, 1940 (aged 53); Bucharest, Kingdom of Romania
- Resting place: Ghencea Cemetery, Bucharest
- Education: Gheorghe Popovici; Emanoil Bardasare
- Known for: Painting, engraving, lithography, drawing, ceramic art
- Movement: Post-Impressionism; Expressionism
- Spouse: Ecaterina Climescu (m. 1913)
- Patrons: Krikor Zambaccian
- Military career
- Allegiance: Kingdom of Romania
- Branch: Romanian Army
- Service years: 1916–1918
- Conflicts: Battle of Turtucaia
- Awards: Order of Michael the Brave
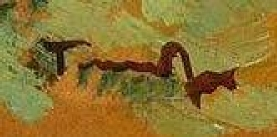
- Signature

Nicolae Tonitza (Romanian pronunciation: [nikoˈla.e toˈnit͡sa]; April 13, 1886 – February 27, 1940) was a Romanian painter, engraver, lithographer, journalist and art critic. Drawing inspiration from Post-Impressionism and Expressionism, he had a major role in introducing modernist guidelines to local art.

== Biography ==
Born on 13 April 1886 as the first of five children of Anastasia and Neculai Toniță. He had three children. Born in Bârlad, he left his hometown in 1902 in order to attend the Iași National School of Fine Arts, where he had among his teachers Gheorghe Popovici and Emanoil Bardasare. The following year he visited Italy together with University of Bucharest students of archaeology under the direction of Grigore Tocilescu. During that period, together with some of his fellow students, Tonitza painted the walls of Grozești church.

In 1908 he left for Munich, where he attended the Royal Academy of Fine Arts; he began publishing political cartoons in Furnica, and contributing art criticism articles to Arta Română. Tonitza spent the following three years in Paris, where he visited artists' studios, and studied famous paintings. Although the young artist's creation would initially conform to the prevalent style, his gift for colour and his personal touch would eventually lead him towards experiment. Throughout his life, he remained committed to the Munich School, hailing its innovative style over the supposedly "obscure imitators of Matisse".

After his return, Tonitza painted frescos in several churches of Moldavia and worked as an art teacher, and then, together with Cezar Petrescu, as editor of Iașul newspaper. He married Ecaterina Climescu in 1913. The art collector Krikor Zambaccian, whom Tonitza befriended after 1925, indicated that, during its existence, Iașul sided with the Conservative Party, opposing Romania's entry into World War I.

In 1916, after Romania entered the conflict, Tonitza was drafted into the Army and fought from 20 to 25 August with the 84th Infantry Regiment at the Battle of Turtucaia. Wounded, he fell prisoner to the Bulgarians, and was sent to an internment camp in Kardzhali, together with fellow painter Sever Burada and the sculptor Horia Boambă. There, he became ill with malaria and rheumatism, which would plague him until his death. For his valor in battle, Tonitza was awarded in November 1916 the Order of Michael the Brave, 3rd class. He was set free and returned in April 1918.

During the 1920s, he was a member of the Arta Română group (alongside Gheorghe Petrașcu and others). His commitment to social commentary is best perceivable in his graphic work, malicious and sometimes dramatical — he sketched for many contemporary, usually political and leftist, magazines: Socialismul (official voice of the short-lived Socialist Party of Romania), Adevărul, Flacăra, Hiena, Rampa, and Scarlat Callimachi's Clopotul —, and in his articles (including the ones in Viața Românească and Curentul), which mainly discussed cultural and social events. He became close to the writer and activist Gala Galaction, whose book O lume nouă he illustrated in 1919, and whose portrait ("The Man of a New World") he painted one year later. His first catalog, issued in 1920, was prefaced by the poet and art critic Tudor Arghezi.

In 1921, Tonitza expanded his range, painting prototypes for a ceramics factory, and organizing a ceramics exhibition; the same year, he moved to Vălenii de Munte, and decided to cease contributing to the press. It was at the time that he developed on his characteristic style and themes, both of which, Zambaccian contended, were determined by his experiences as a father.

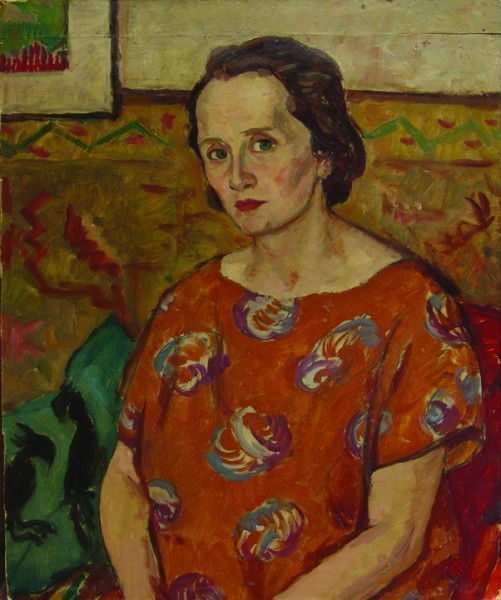
Ecaterina Tonitza, painter's wife, portrait by Ștefan Dimitrescu

Later, he became the editor of the art magazine Artele Frumoase, and, in 1922, traveled to Transylvania, where he befriended Aurel Popp. The same year, he took Camil Ressu's defense during a scandal involving the latter's design for a National Theater curtain, attacking the artistic guidelines advocated by the cultural establishment ("[Romania is] the country where scientist historians compose erotic pieces and embarrassing rhymes, [...] where intellectual women draw the gusty gestures of decrepit election agents, [...] where physicians push their rusty hypodermics into the unmentionable muscle tissues of artists as a means to draw up aesthetical logarithms"). In 1926, Tonitza, Oscar Han, Francisc Șirato, and Ștefan Dimitrescu, organized themselves as Grupul celor patru ("The Group of Four"). He met success in 1925, after opening a large exhibit of his Vălenii de Munte paintings in Bucharest, while raising controversy (including criticism from Ressu) over his "poster-like" style.

Despite his fame, he continued to live an impoverished and hectic existence, which probably contributed to the decline of his health. By 1931, he was dividing his time between Bucharest and Constanța, having agreed to paint the walls of Saint George's Church in the latter city. Tonitza was angered by the reception of his work in Constanța, declaring himself insulted after he was made to showcase his designs in competition to lesser-known artists. Eventually, he received the commission, and spent the next two years at work on the murals, while distancing himself from Grupul celor patru.

Upon Dimitrescu's death in 1933, Tonitza held his chair at the Fine Arts Academy in Iași. A participant in several national exhibitions and World Fairs, he painted his last works around Balchik.

According to Zambaccian, Tonitza's early association with socialism was partly due to the interest taken in him by the leftist press, who was willing to reward his contributions at a time when "one could not live solely by painting". The same source stated that the artist later refrained from expressing political opinions, and, on one occasion during the 1930s, jokingly referred to himself as "a supporter of Petre P. Carp" (the Conservative leader had died in 1919). Nevertheless, he signed, alongside several other prominent cultural figures, an appeal to tighten cultural connections between Romania and the Soviet Union, leading to the creation of Societatea pentru întreținerea raporturilor culturale dintre România și Uniunea Sovietică (the Society for Maintaining Cultural Links between Romania and the Soviet Union) in May 1935 (see Amicii URSS).

He fell severely ill in 1937, and died three years later. He is buried at the Ghencea Cemetery, in Bucharest.

== Art ==
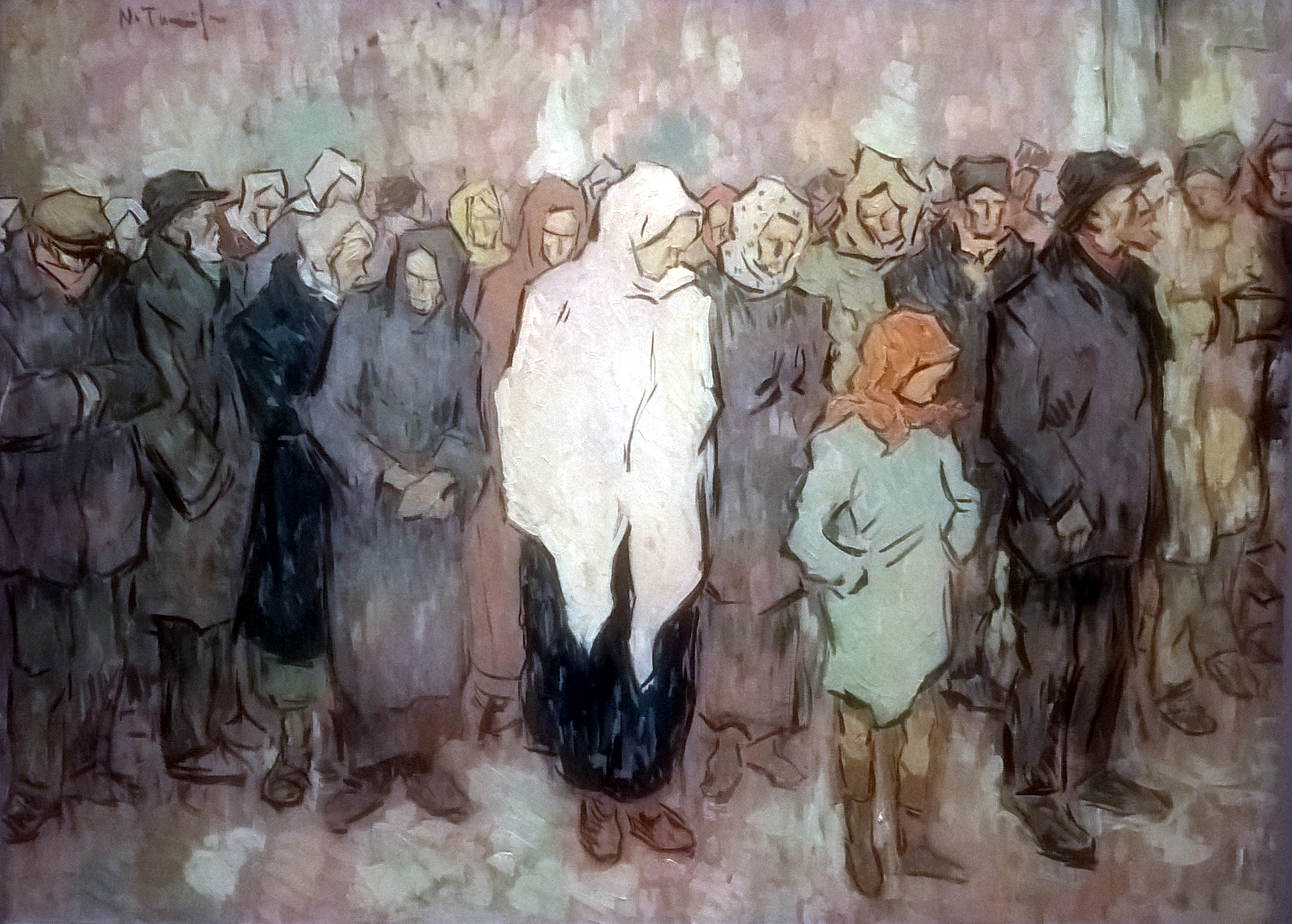
Coadă la pâine ("Queuing for Bread", 1920)

Owing much to the art of his predecessor Ştefan Luchian, Tonitza was largely inspired by Impressionism, but he equally admired the discoveries made by Post-impressionist artists (their revolution in composition and Belle Époque splendor). Tonitza was notably critical of Nicolae Grigorescu, the major trend-setter in Romanian art, whose success over "peasant motifs", he stated, had "lured him to remain, for the rest of his life, in this rosy and light-hearted atmosphere". He equally objected to Grigorescu's influence over younger generations, which had led to "mannerism" and "nationalism" in choice of subjects, and the emergent urbane art ("where man shall represent only a decorative and amusing accessory").

Evidencing his "tormented life" and "fantasy-driven and bohemian lifestyle", Zambaccian wondered if these had not been the source of Tonitza's "ingenious art, full of chromatic joys that are nonetheless transited by melancholia". He drew a direct comparison between the artist's innovative presence in painting and George Bacovia's Symbolist poetry.

During his stay abroad, Nicolae Tonitza was influenced by the works of Rembrandt and Antonio da Correggio. An admirer of both Frans Masereel and Käthe Kollwitz, he also adapted Expressionist guidelines — ones especially present in his satirical drawings, but also manifested large works such as Coadă la pâine ("Queuing for Bread", 1920). According to Zambaccian, Tonitza stopped short of adopting clear Expressionist tenets ("Modigliani and Pascin favored contorting [shapes], while Tonitza does not stray away from nature and places an emphasis on feeling"); the two continued to oppose each other on the issue of Henri Matisse's style (admired by Zambaccian, by hotly contested by Tonitza). A more distant but no less direct influence was the graphic art of Honoré Daumier, which Tonitza had studied.

The early art produced by these influences was described in Sburătorul by Şirato, Tonitza's friend, as "paintings which are [in fact] drawings with a light resonance of intellectualism"; during the period, Rampa magazine hailed the painter as "A priest of humanitarian ideas, of ideas demanding the attention of present-day world leaders, with a more and more clear and audacious tone".

Most of his works are serene in tones, in contrast with those expressing Tonitza's involvement in social issues. They proposed a classical aesthetical ideal, viewing art as a treasurer of spiritual values. This message is most obvious in his Northern Dobruja landscapes, his still life studies, the portraits of clowns (celebrated for their way of sublimating the comic and grotesque elements in masks and makeup, in order to reveal a sad humanity), young women and children. The so-called "Tonitza eyes", both point-shaped and expressive, are a characteristic trait in his children portraits. In contrast with their appreciation for these pieces, Zambaccian and other members of Grupul celor patru expostulated the Balchik landscapes: Zambaccian remarked that his were "more like arabesques in colored tones, [...] at a time when Șirato evolved upward toward a nuanced painting of a beautiful representativeness in a luminous space".

== Works ==
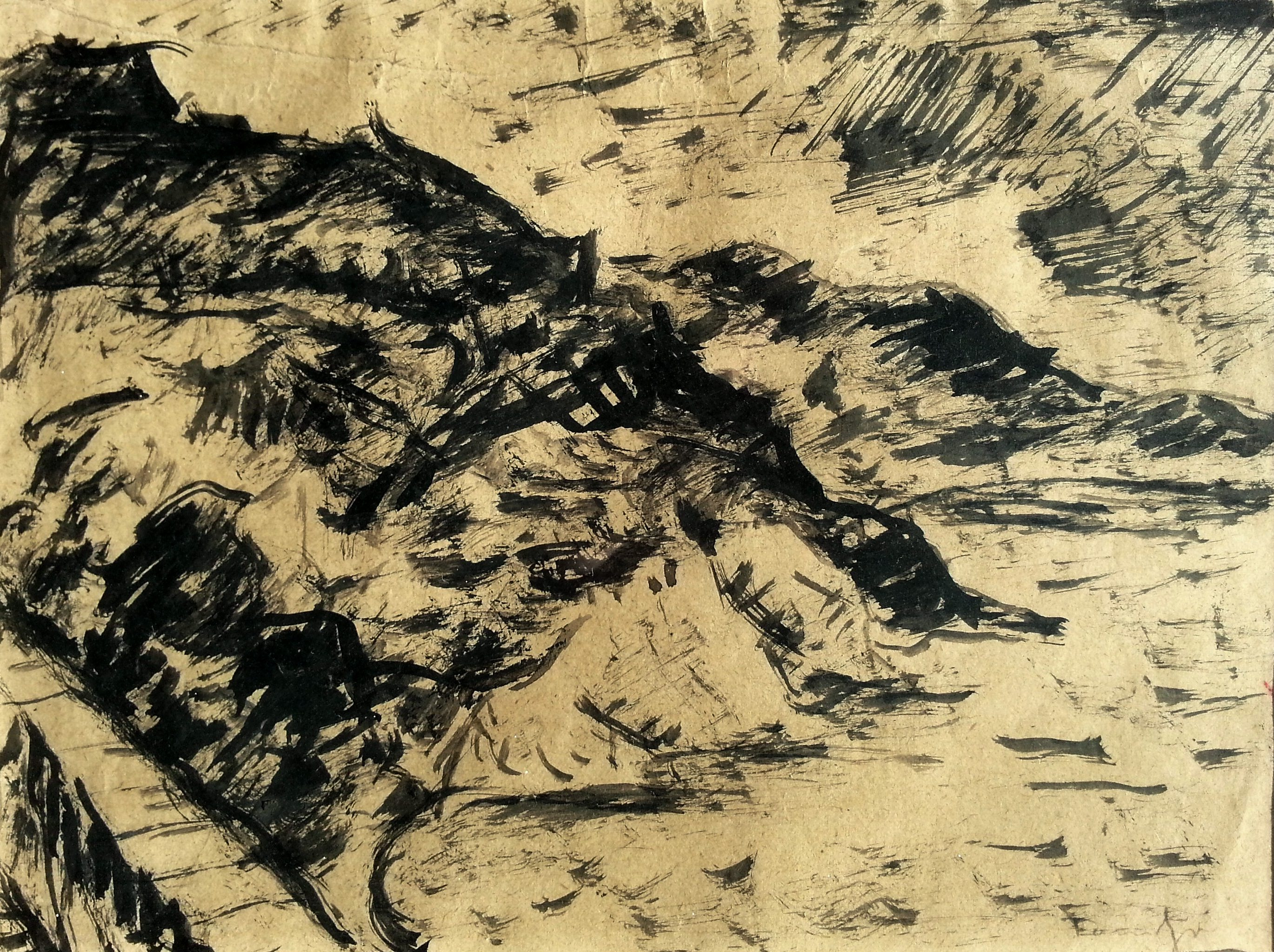
Seaside

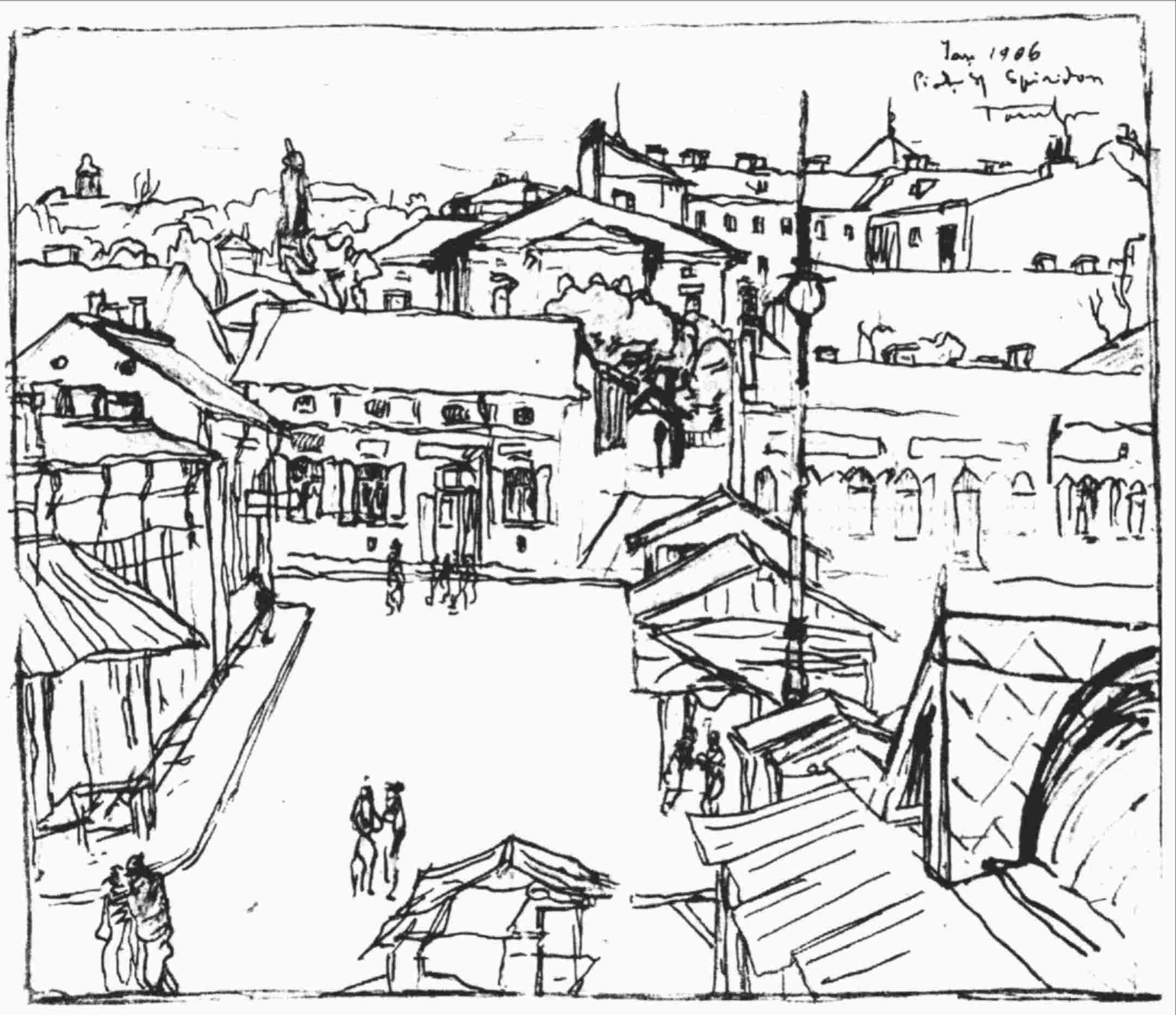
Sf. Spiridon Square in Iași (1906)

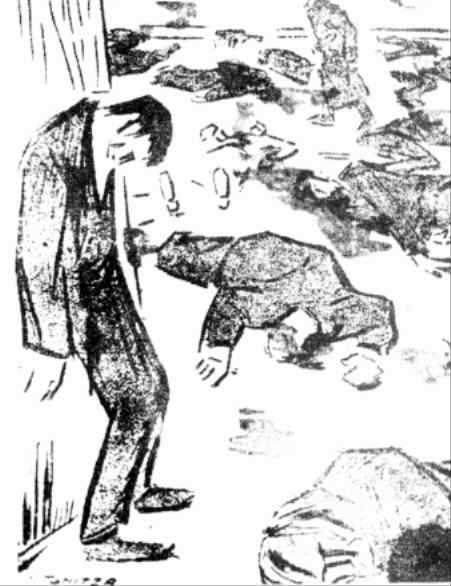
1919 cartoon

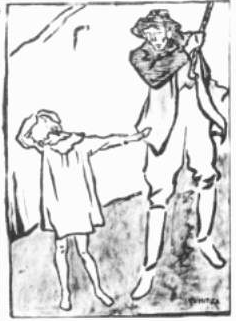
1920 cartoon

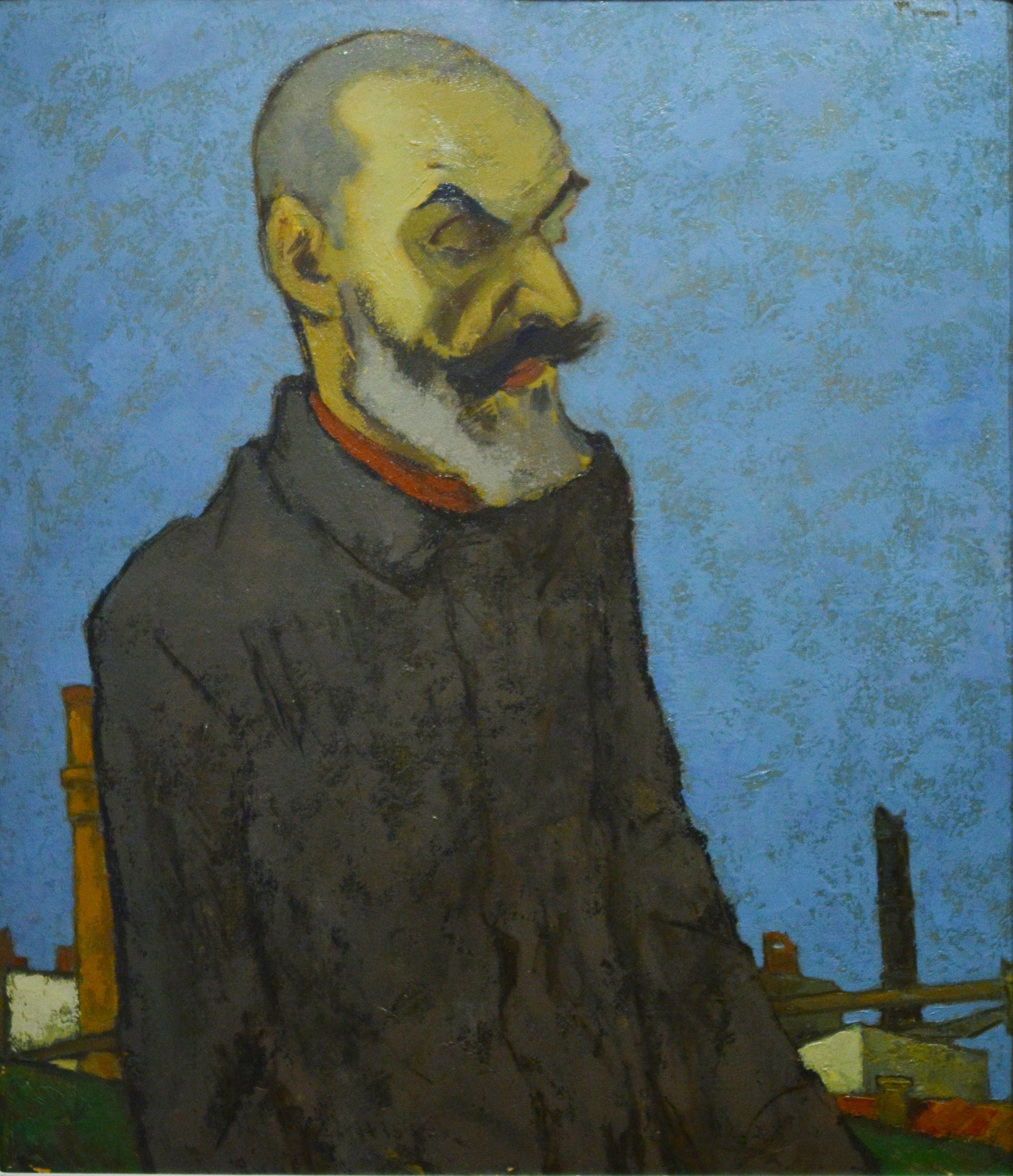
The Man of a New World, portrait of Gala Galaction (1920)

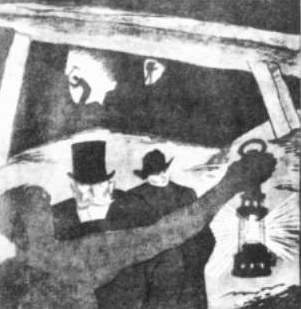
1922 cartoon

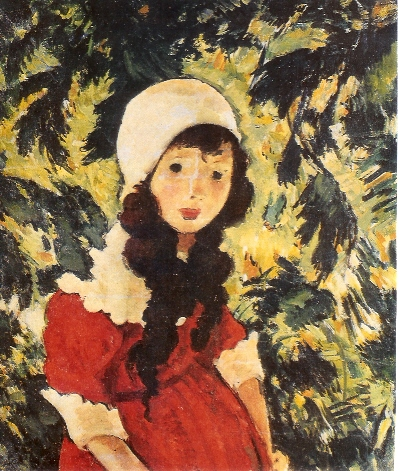
The Forester's Daughter (1924)

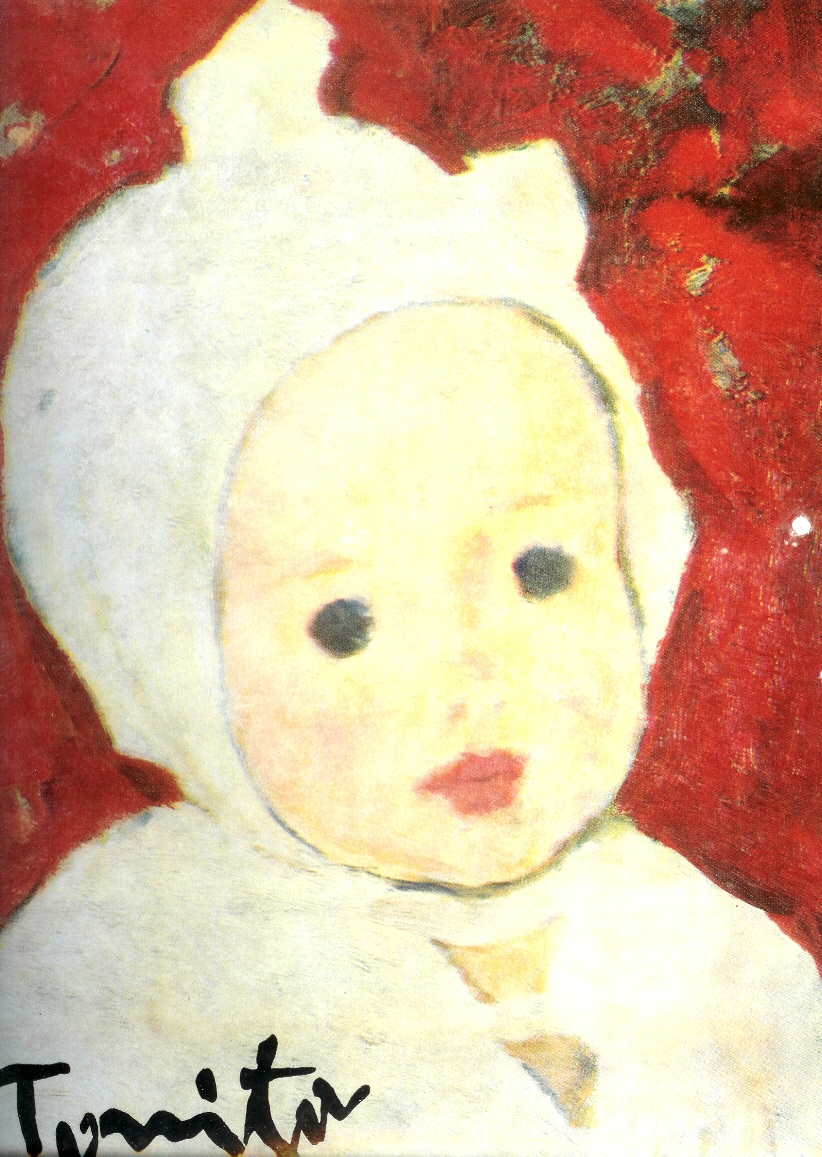
Portrait of a Child (1926)

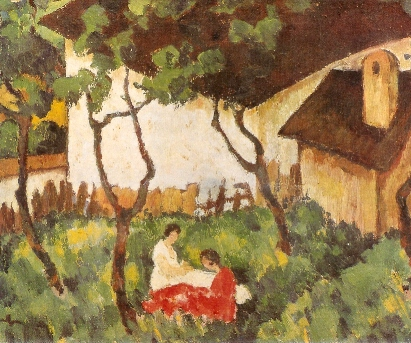
The Garden in Văleni (1926)

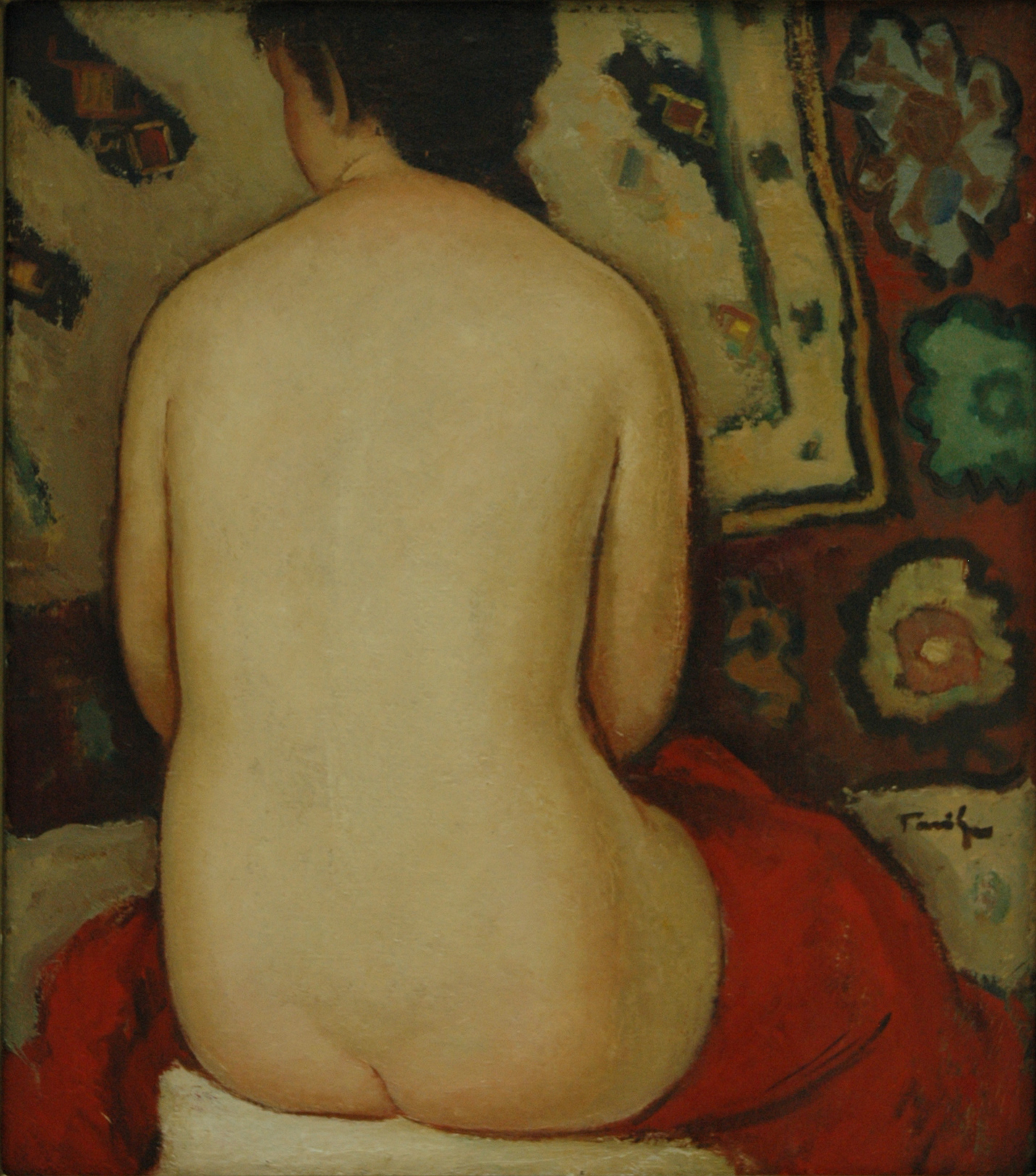
Nude (1927)

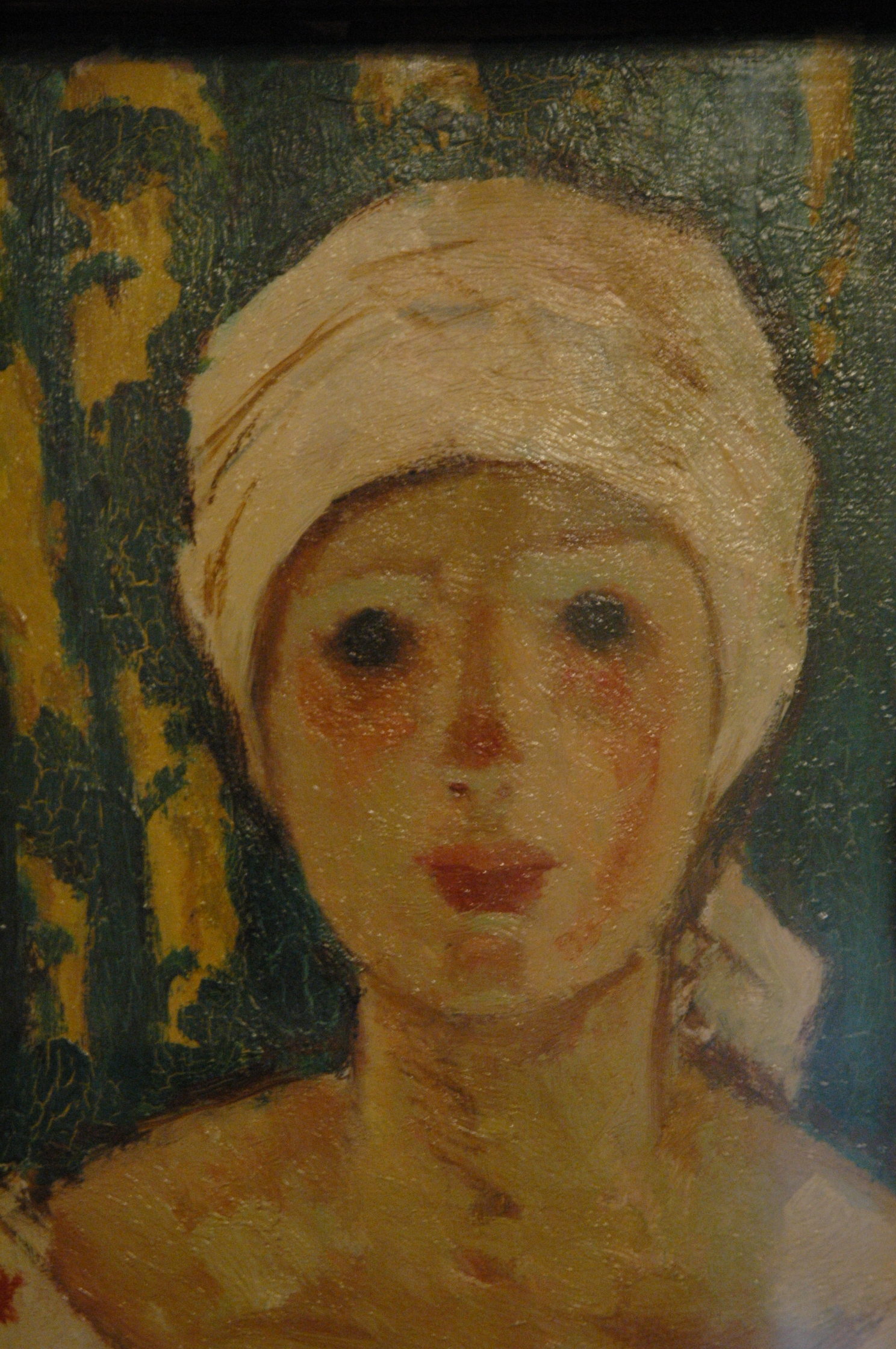
Portrait of a girl (19xx)
