= Urmuz =

Romanian writer, lawyer and civil servant (1883–1923)

Urmuz Demetru Dem. Demetrescu-Buzău
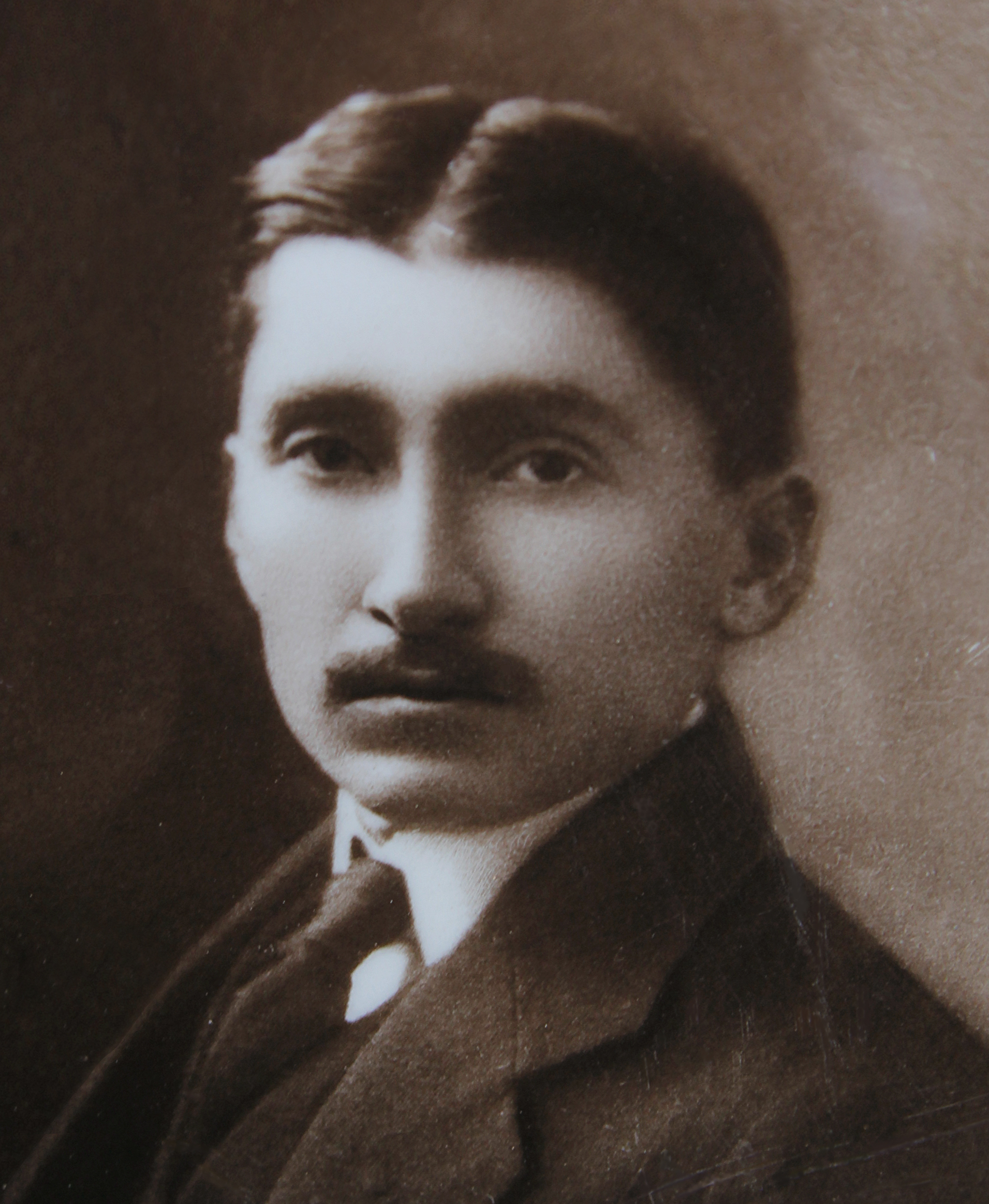
- Urmuz, c. 1920
- Born: March 17, 1883; Curtea de Argeș, Kingdom of Romania
- Died: November 23, 1923 (aged 40); Bucharest, Kingdom of Romania
- Occupations: writer, humorist, judge, clerk
- Writing career
- Pen name: Ciriviș, Hurmuz
- Period: c. 1908–1923
- Genres: Absurdist fiction, antinovel, aphorism, experimental literature, fable, fantasy literature, mythopoeia, nonsense verse, parody, sketch story
- Literary movement: Avant-garde; Futurism

Urmuz (Romanian pronunciation: [urˈmuz], pen name of Demetru Dem. Demetrescu-Buzău, also known as Hurmuz or Ciriviș, born Dimitrie Dim. Ionescu-Buzeu; March 17, 1883 – November 23, 1923) was a Romanian writer, lawyer and civil servant, who became a cult hero in Romania's avant-garde scene. His scattered work, consisting of absurdist short prose and poetry, opened a new genre in Romanian letters and humor, and captured the imagination of modernists for several generations. Urmuz's Bizarre (or Weird) Pages were largely independent of European modernism, even though some may have been triggered by Futurism; their valorization of nonsense verse, black comedy, nihilistic tendencies and exploration into the unconscious mind have repeatedly been cited as influential for the development of Dadaism and the Theatre of the Absurd. Individual pieces such as "The Funnel and Stamate", "Ismaïl and Turnavitu", "Algazy & Grummer" or "The Fuchsiad" are parody fragments, dealing with monstrous and shapeshifting creatures in mundane settings, and announcing techniques later taken up by Surrealism.

Urmuz's biography between his high school eccentricity and his public suicide remains largely mysterious, and some of the sympathetic accounts have been described as purposefully deceptive. The abstruse imagery of his work has produced a large corpus of diverging interpretations. He has notably been read as a satirist of public life in the 1910s, an unlikely conservative and nostalgic, or an emotionally distant esotericist.

In Urmuz's lifetime, his stories were only acted out by his thespian friend George Ciprian and published as samples by Cuget Românesc newspaper, with support from modernist writer Tudor Arghezi. Ciprian and Arghezi were together responsible for creating the link between Urmuz and the emerging avant-garde, their activity as Urmuz promoters being later enhanced by such figures as Ion Vinea, Geo Bogza, Lucian Boz, Sașa Pană and Eugène Ionesco. Beginning in the late 1930s, Urmuz also became the focus interest for the elite critics, who either welcomed him into 20th-century literature or dismissed him as a buffoonish impostor. By then, his activity also inspired an eponymous avant-garde magazine edited by Bogza, as well as Ciprian's drama The Drake's Head.

== Name ==
Urmuz's birth name was, in full, Dimitrie Dim. Ionescu-Buzeu (or Buzău), changed to Dimitrie Dim. Dumitrescu-Buzeu when he was still a child, and later settled as Demetru Dem. Demetrescu-Buzău. The Demetrescu surname was in effect a Romanian patronymic, using the -escu suffix: his father was known as Dimitrie (Demetru, Dumitru) Ionescu-Buzău. The attached particle Buzău, originally Buzeu, confirms that the family traced its roots to the eponymous town. According to George Ciprian, the names Ciriviș (variation of cerviș, Romanian for "melted grease") and Mitică (pet form of Dumitru) were coined while the writer was still in school, whereas Urmuz came "later".

The name under which the writer is universally known did not actually originate from his own wishes, but was selected and imposed on the public by Arghezi, only one year before Urmuz committed suicide. The spelling Hurmuz, when used in reference to the writer, was popular in the 1920s, but has since been described as erroneous. The variant Ormuz, sometimes rendered as Urmuz, was also used as a pen name by the activist and novelist A. L. Zissu.

The word [h]urmuz, explained by linguists as a curious addition to the Romanian lexis, generally means "glass bead", "precious stone" or "snowberry". It has entered the language through oriental channels, and these meanings ultimately refer to the international trade in beads centered on Hormuz Island, Iran. Anthropologist and essayist Vasile Andru highlights a secondary, scatological, meaning: in the Romani language, a source of Romanian slang, urmuz, "bead", has mutated to mean "feces". An alternative etymology, exclusive to the author's pseudonym, was advanced by writer and scholar Ioana Pârvulescu. It suggests the combination of two contradictory terms: ursuz ("surly") and amuz ("I amuse").

== Biography ==
=== Childhood ===
Mitică was the eldest son of a middle class nuclear family: his father, described by Ciprian as "short and mean" (om scund și ciufut), was the director of Curtea de Argeș Hospital in the 1890s. In his spare time, Ionescu-Buzeu Sr. was also a classical scholar, folklorist and active Freemason. His wife, the writer's mother, was Eliza née Pașcani, sister of the doctor, chemist and University of Paris professor Cristien Pascani. Urmuz had numerous other siblings ("a multitude", according to Ciprian), of whom most were daughters. One of Urmuz's sisters, Eliza (married Vorvoreanu) was later a main source of information on the author's childhood and adolescence.

The future Urmuz was born in the northern Muntenian town of Curtea de Argeș, and, at age five, spent one year in Paris with his parents. The family eventually settled in Romania's capital, Bucharest, where his father was hygiene teacher at Matei Basarab National College, later city health inspector, and rented houses in Antim Monastery quarter. Young Mitică was described by his sister as mainly unpretentious and introverted, fascinated by scientific discovery and, in his childhood years, a passionate reader of Jules Verne's science fiction books. At a later stage, he was also possibly familiarized with and influenced by German idealism and by the philosophical views of 19th-century poet Mihai Eminescu. A more evident influence on the future writer was Ion Luca Caragiale, the main figure in early 20th-century Romanian comic theatre.

Ionescu-Buzău's family had artistic interests, and Urmuz grew up with a fascination for classical music and fine art, learning to play the piano and taking up amateur oil painting. He got along best with his mother, who was also a pianist. The devout daughter of an Orthodox priest, she was unable to instill in her young son the same respect for the Church.

Urmuz's arrival to literary history took place in the atmosphere of Bucharest gymnasia. It was at this junction that he became a mate of Ciprian, who later described their encounter as momentous: "I don't much believe in destiny. [...] Yet I find it such an odd incident that my bench mate, from my failing grade year through to my high school graduation, was [...] this tiny man of a rare originality, who had a massive say on how my life would turn up." Ciprian describes what follows as his own "initiation in artistic matters": he recalls conversations with "Ciriviș" where they debated the "perfection" of Ancient Greek sculpture, and mentions that young Urmuz, unlike himself, regarded theater as a "minor art". Instead, Urmuz preferred to attend concerts at the Romanian Atheneum, and, Ciprian writes, had an advanced understanding of absolute music even at age thirteen. Reportedly, the young man was also in the attendance at lectures given by Titu Maiorescu, a philosopher and aesthete who had influenced both Eminescu and Caragiale.

=== Pahuci brotherhood ===
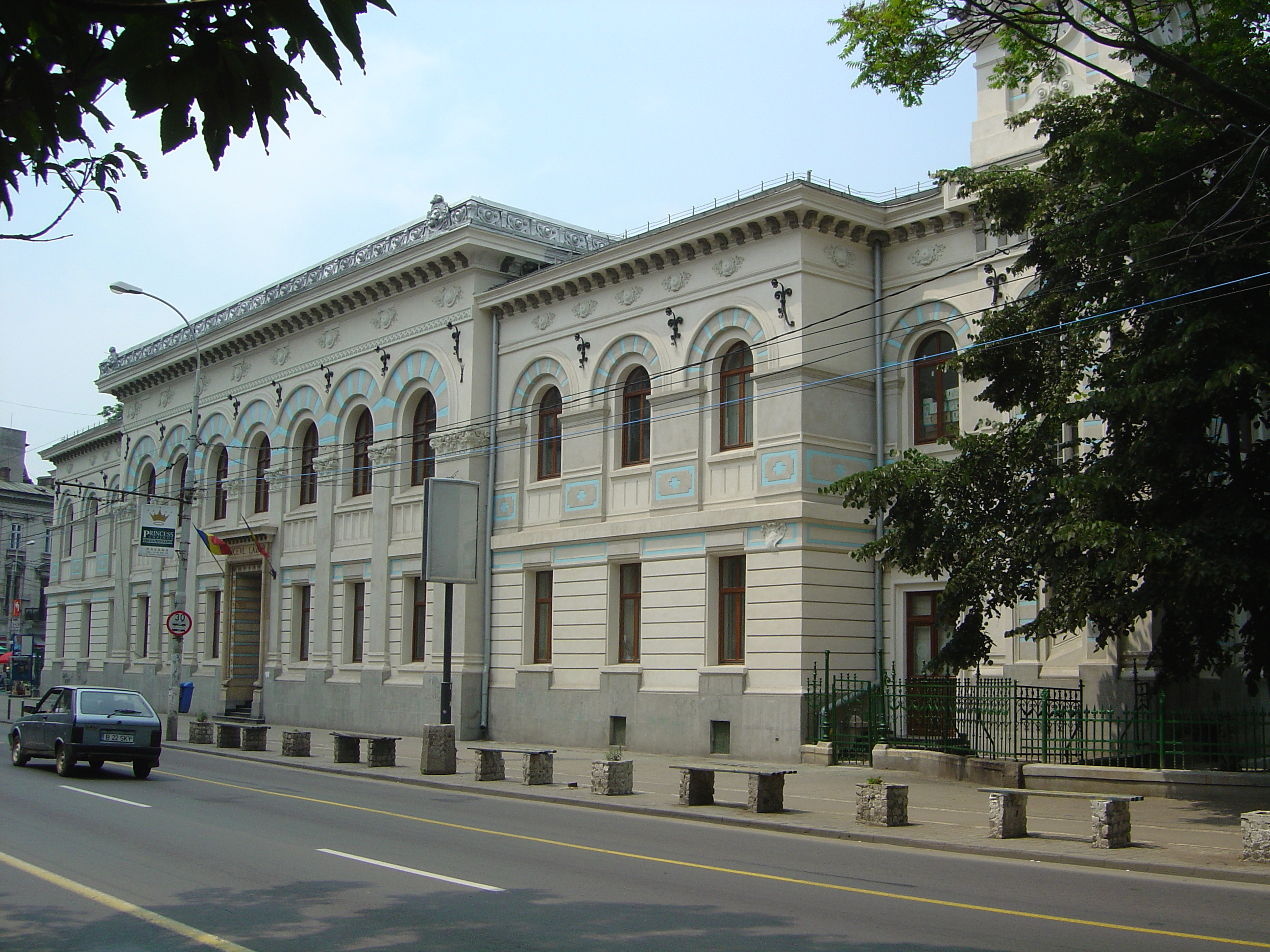
Gheorghe Lazăr National College

Some years later, while enrolled at the Gheorghe Lazăr National College, Urmuz turned his interest toward mocking the severity of his teachers and challenging the dominance of artistic traditionalism. One such early episode is attested by Ciprian: amused by the creation of a Vivat Dacia ("Long Live Dacia") association of nationalist students, Urmuz subverted its meetings, and, with deadpan snark, suggested that membership fees should be paid in duck heads. Also according to Ciprian, these events soon lost their shock value, leading him and Urmuz to "take to the streets", where they began their activity as pranksters. Their initial experiment was to pressure law-abiding and credulous passers-by into presenting their identity papers for inspection, and the apparent success earned Urmuz an unexpected following in school (his fans even heckled Vivat Dacia into accepting poultry heads as means of payment, before the society dissolved itself with ceremony). Another colleague, future traditionalist poet Vasile Voiculescu, recalled young Urmuz as "genially knavish", his humor being "cerebral, harder to detect and appreciate".

The core group of Urmuzian disciples, organized as a secret society, comprised Ciprian (nicknamed "Macferlan" by Urmuz), Alexandru "Bălălău" Bujoreanu and Costică "Pentagon" Grigorescu, together known as the pahuci. Allegedly, the obscure word originated from the Hebrew for "yawns". Their activity centered on daring pranks: Urmuz and the other three young men once made an impromptu visit to the isolated Căldărușani Monastery, in Ilfov County, where the deposed and disgraced Metropolitan Ghenadie was living in banishment. Passing themselves off as newspaper editors, they demanded (and received) honored guest treatment, tested the monks' patience, and were later introduced to a well-disposed Ghenadie. Ciprian also recalls that Urmuz's philosophical musings or deadpan surreal humor were a direct inspiration for other pranks and experiments. He describes how Ciriviș acted out sadness for the plight of a screechy sledge (declaring "my heart is at one with all things in existence"), but then duped onlookers into believing that the squeaks came from a woman somehow trapped under the vehicle. Reportedly, Urmuz also approached his seniors training at seminaries or other traditionalist institutions, earned their attention by claiming to share the nationalist agenda, and then began reciting them nonsense lyrics such as an evolving draft of his mock-fable "The Chroniclers".

Outside school, the young man was still introverted, and, Sandqvist notes, "extremely shy, especially with girls." Ciprian recalls Ciriviș's engrossing pick-up lines: he acted familiar to any young woman who caught his eye, assuring her that they had met once before, and, having stirred her curiosity, falsely recounting how they both used to kill flesh-flies for sport.

The pahuci welcomed their graduation with one final act of defiance against the school principal, whom they visited in his office, where they began hopping about in circles. Even though their group did not survive once its members took different career paths, they had regular reunions at the Spiru Godelea tavern, where they earned notoriety for their rude and unconventional behavior. Urmuz enrolled at the Bucharest Medical School, allegedly after pressures from his stern father. According to Ciprian, this training did not agree with his friend, who would complain of being "unable to make himself understood by the cadavers." This was probably a sign that the young man could not bear to witness dissection. He eventually entered the University of Bucharest Faculty of Law, which was to be his alma mater, while also taking lectures in composition and counterpoint at the Music and Declamation Conservatory. Additionally, he completed his first service term in the Romanian Infantry.

Urmuz became head of his family in 1907. That year, his father and two younger brothers died, and his sister Eliza was married. He also continued to take the initiative in daring acts of épater le bourgeois. Ciprian recalls the two of them renting a carriage which Urmuz would order around, making a right at every junction, and effectively going around in circles around the Palace of Justice. Urmuz then proceeded to pester the street vendors, stopping over to buy a random assortment of useless items: pretzels, a pile of charcoal, and an old hen which he impaled on his walking cane.

=== Dobrujan career and military life ===
Having passed his law examination in 1904, Urmuz was first appointed judge in the rural locality of Cocu (Răchițele), in Argeș County. It is probable that at around this stage (ca. 1908), he was committing to paper the first fragments in his collection Bizarre Pages, some of which were reportedly written during a family reunion in Cocu. According to Eliza Vorvoreanu, he was doing this mainly to entertain his mother and sisters, but Urmuz also amused local potentates, one of whom even offered his daughter's hand in marriage (Urmuz refused). At the time, Mitică also discovered his passion for modern art: he was an admirer of primitivist sculptor Constantin Brâncuși, fascinated by his 1907 work The Wisdom of the Earth.

Eventually, Urmuz was made a justice of the peace in the remote Dobruja region: for a while, he was in Casimcea village. Later, he was dispatched closer to Bucharest, at Ghergani, Dâmbovița County. These assignments were interrupted in 1913, when Urmuz was called under arms, in the Second Balkan War against Bulgaria.

Ciprian mentions having lost touch with his friend "for a long time", before receiving a letter in which the latter complained about the provincial apathy and the lack of musical entertainment; attached was a draft of the "Algazy & Grummer" story, which Ciprian was supposed to read to the "seminary brethren", informing them "about the progresses registered in young literature". Ciprian tells of having discovered the writer in Urmuz, and popularizing this and other stories in his own circle of intellectuals. He also mentions that, in his budding acting career, he was basing some of his performances at Blanduzia Garden on Urmuz's letters.

These developments coincided with the outbreak of World War I. Between 1914 and summer 1916, when Romania was still neutral territory, Ciprian's efforts of circulating the Bizarre Pages may have reached a peak. Urmuz's texts were probably spread around in handwritten copies, becoming somewhat familiar to Bucharest's bohemian society, but Urmuz himself was still an anonymous figure. Both Ciprian and fellow actor Grigore Mărculescu are said to have given public readings from the Bizarre Pages at Casa Capșa restaurant. According to literary historian Paul Cernat, if rumors about Ciprian's early performances of Urmuz's texts are true, it would constitute one of the first samples of avant-garde shows in Romanian theatrical tradition.

Around 1916, Urmuz had obtained a relocation, as judge in the Muntenian town of Alexandria. It was there that he met with poet and schoolteacher Mihail Cruceanu, also on assignment. As Cruceanu later recalled, Urmuz was captivated by the artistic revolt carried out in Italy by the Futurist group, and in particular by the poetry of Futurist leader Filippo Tommaso Marinetti. According to literary historian Tom Sandqvist, Urmuz may have first read about the Italian initiatives in the local newspaper Democrația, which had covered them in early 1909. As a result of this or another encounter, he decided to include, as a subtitle to one of his manuscripts, the words: Schițe și nuvele... aproape futuriste ("Sketches and Novellas... almost Futuristic").

Having reached the rank of Lieutenant, Demetrescu-Buzău was again called under arms when Romania joined the Entente Powers. In one account, he saw action against the Central Powers in Moldavia, following the Army's northward retreat. However, this is partly contradicted by his correspondence from Moldavia, which shows that his new office was as a quartermaster, and which records his frustration at not having been allowed to fight in the trenches. According to another account, he was mostly bedridden with malaria, and therefore unable to perform any military duty.

=== Debut ===
Urmuz was again in Bucharest, working as grefier (registrar or court reporter) at the High Court of Cassation and Justice; sources disagree on whether this appointment dated from 1918 or earlier. Reportedly, this was a well paid employment with special perks, which may have made Urmuz uncomfortable about his other life as a bohemian hero. A photograph portrait taken in that period, one of the few to survive, was read as an additional clue that Urmuz had become melancholy and anxious. Sandqvist also sees him as a "catastrophically lonely" and insomniac customer of the brothels, adding: "To all appearances as a result of disgusting experiences during the wars, returning home to Bucharest Demetru Demetrescu-Buzău chose to live an extremely ascetic and isolated life with long night walks." Urmuz's feats and pranks were nonetheless attracting more public attention, and he himself allegedly read his work to a bohemian public, in places such as Gabroveni Inn; at least some of these were free exercises in oral literature, and as such entirely lost.

The year 1922 brought Urmuz's debut in print. Fascinated by the (then unnamed) Bizarre Pages, poet and journalist Tudor Arghezi included two of them in Cuget Românesc newspaper. Arghezi reportedly made efforts to persuade his more serious fellow editors of Cuget, and possibly intended to undermine their attempt of putting out a newspaper of record. The gazette had also published a manifesto by Arghezi, in which he had outlined the goal of combating "sterile literature", and his intention of cultivating the "will to power" in post-war literary culture. Urmuz was thus the first avant-garde writer popularized by Arghezi, in a list which, by 1940, also came to include a large section of the younger Romanian modernists.

Arghezi later wrote that his relationship with Urmuz was difficult, especially since the grefier panicked that the establishment would discover his other career: "he feared that the Cassation Court would better detect him as Urmuz than under his own name". The memoirist refers to Demetrescu-Buzău's perfectionism and unease, enhanced in the week before publication: "He would wake up in the middle of the night and would send a very urgent letter, asking me if the comma after a 'that' should be moved before. I found him wandering around my house at night, shy, restless, fainthearted or in a hopeful trance, that something of substance may or may not be found in his prose, that perhaps there's an error, asking me to publish it, and then again to destroy it; to publish it together with a eulogistic note, and then again to curse him. He bribed [the printers] to change phrases and words that I had to put back into place, as previous editorial interventions were for sure better than his." The letters they exchanged show that the grefier was not enthusiastic about even seeing his texts and his pseudonym in print, to which Arghezi was replying: "from among the few we'll be cooperating with, you were my first choice".

By May 1922, Urmuz had grown more confident in his strength as a writer. He sent Arghezi a copy of the "Algazy & Grummer" story, which, he joked, needed to be published for "the nation's benefit". He also proposed headlining it with the additional title Bizarre Pages. The work was never published by Cuget, probably because of a change in priorities: around that date, the paper hosted traditionalist editorials by culture critic Nicolae Iorga, which were incompatible with Arghezi's fronde.

=== Suicide ===
On November 23, 1923, Urmuz shot himself, an event which remains shrouded in mystery. His death occurred in a public location, described as being close to Kiseleff Road in northern Bucharest. Some early sources suggest that he may have been suffering from an incurable disease, but he is also argued to have been fascinated with guns and their destructive potential. In 1914 for instance, he wrote down in his papers a homage to revolvers, crediting them with a magical power over the suicidal brain. Reports also show that he was theorizing the purposelessness and hollowness of life, addressing his fears on the subject to family members during the funeral of his brother Constantin (also in 1914). Researcher Geo Șerban wrote about Demetrescu-Buzău's well-hidden disappointment, assessing that, during his final year, the writer continued to act cheerful and relaxed, but that a "devastating" tension was building up inside him. At around that time, Urmuz took his one real trip as an adult civilian, visiting the Budaki Lagoon in Bessarabia.

Writing in 1927, Arghezi publicized his regret at not having cultivated the friendship: "I never saw him again and I am weighed down by the irreparable grief of never seeking him out. I believe my optimism could have rekindled in his cerebral chaos those candid and pure things that were beginning to die." Several Urmuz exegetes have traditionally seen the suicide intrinsically linked to Urmuz's artistic attitude. For scholar Carmen Blaga, it was the "dissolution of [his] faith" in Romania's intellectual class, along with economic decline and "an existential void", that prompted the writer to opt himself out. This resonates with claims by the first-generation followers of Urmuz: Geo Bogza suggests that his mentor killed himself once the deconstructive process, performed by his "sharp intellect", reached a natural conclusion; Sașa Pană claims that Urmuz was tired of merely amusing the "cretins" and "profiteers" who held sway over Bucharest's literary scene, and, determined to turn his literary persona into "stardust", took the risk of destroying his physical self. Additionally, academic George Călinescu argued that there was a philosophical rationale "very in tune with his century": "he wanted to die in some original way, 'without any cause'."

Kept at the city morgue, the body was assigned to Urmuz's brother-in-law and fellow clerk C. Stoicescu, who stated that the writer had been suffering from neurosis. Urmuz was buried on November 26, in his family plot at Bellu cemetery. On the day, the event was publicized by a small obituary in Dimineața daily, signed with the initial C (presumably, for Ciprian). Both this and other press notices failed to mention that the grefier and the published author were one and the same, and the general public was for long unaware of any such connection. Story goes that an anonymous woman visited the family shortly after the burial, inquiring as to whether the deceased had left any letters.

In its manuscript form, Urmuz's definitive corpus of works covers only 40 pages, 50 at most. Various other manuscripts survive, including diaries and hundreds of aphorisms, but have for long been unknown to researchers.

== Urmuz's ideas and stylistic affinities ==
=== The avant-garde herald vs. the conservative ===
Shortly after his death, Urmuz's work was linked to the emergence of avant-garde rebellion throughout Europe, and in particular to the rise of Romania's own modernist scene: writing in 2007, Paul Cernat describes this version of events as a "founding myth" of Romanian avant-garde literature. A literary critic and modernist enthusiast, Lucian Boz, assessed that Urmuz, like Arthur Rimbaud before him, embodied the "lyrical nihilism" of avant-garde currents. In the 1960s, literary historian Ovid Crohmălniceanu wrote of his being "the world's first pre-Dada exercises". In 2002 however, scholar Adrian Lăcătuș revised this thesis, arguing that it had created a "blockage" in critical reception, and that the actual Urmuz had more complex views on the avant-garde. Others have emphasized that Urmuz's unusual revolt ran contemporary with the revival of intense traditionalism of Romanian literature (the Sămănătorul moment), which would make his pre-Dada inspiration a moment of special significance.

The contact with Futurism, although acknowledged by Urmuz, is judged by many of his commentators as superficial and delayed. Literary historian Nicolae Balotă first proposed that the Romanian had merely wanted to show his sympathy for (and not a like-mindedness with) Futurism; that the works in question date back before the Futurist Manifesto, to the Cocu period; and that the Bizarre Pages have more in common with Expressionism than with Marinetti. According to Cernat: "By the looks of it, [the Bizarre Pages] were completed largely independent of influence from the European avant-garde movements [...]. We do not know, however, how many of these were already completed in 1909, the year when European Futurism was 'invented'." Emilia Drogoreanu, a researcher of Romanian Futurism, stresses: "The values and representations of [the] world celebrated through Futurism exist within the Urmuzian text, but are entirely uprooted from the significance offered them by [the Futurists]". Although she finds various similarities between Urmuz and Marinetti, Carmen Blaga notes that the former's jadedness was no match for the latter's militancy.

Various authors have also suggested that Urmuz was actually a radical conservative, whose vehemence against platitude in art only camouflaged a basic conventionalism. This perspective found its voice with Lăcătuș, who sees Urmuz as a conservative heretic, equally annoyed by bourgeois and anti-bourgeois discourses. Writing in 1958, Ciprian also reflected on the possibility that Ciriviș was actually "teasing" the avant-garde tendencies emerging in his day, but concluded: "I would rather assume that under these various experiments was smoldering the lust for shaking the individual out of his skin, of tearing him away from himself, of disassembling him, of making him doubt the authenticity of accumulated knowledge." He writes that Urmuz's work lashed out at "human nature in its most intimate creases." Accordingly, some authors have even considered Urmuz the inheritor of late-19th-century Decadence or of a matured alexandrine purity. In other such readings, Urmuz appears to lend his backing to the sexist or antisemitic viewpoints of his contemporaries. Crohmălniceanu also writes: "the musings comprised in his manuscript notebooks [...] are restrained, flat, commonplace, as if the work of a different man."

Much debate surrounds the issue of Urmuz's connection to an absurdist streak in earlier Romanian literature and folklore. In the 1940s, George Călinescu discussed in detail an Urmuzian tradition, of as being characteristic for the literary culture of Romania's southern, Wallachian, cities. He noted that Urmuz was one of "the great grimacing sensitive" Wallachians, a "Balkan" succession which also includes Hristache the Baker, Anton Pann, Ion Minulescu, Mateiu Caragiale, Ion Barbu and Arghezi. In his definition, the source of Arghezi and Urmuz is in the folkloric tradition of self-parody, where the doina songs degenerate into spells or "grotesque whines". The image of a folkloric Urmuz was soon after taken up by other critics, including Eugenio Coșeriu and Crohmălniceanu.

=== The buffoon vs. the professional writer ===
A section among Urmuz's commentators tends to classify him as a genial but superficial prankster, a buffoon rather than a serious author. Although sympathetic to Urmuz's work, George Călinescu called the Bizarre Pages "an intelligent literary game" of "witty teenagers". The goal, Călinescu suggested, was "purely epic", "seeming to tell a story without in fact recounting anything". Another verdict of this kind belongs to aesthetician Tudor Vianu, who also believed that Urmuz was a satirist of automatic behavior, and fundamentally a sarcastic realist. More severe in tone, Pompiliu Constantinescu assessed that Urmuz was superficial, chaotic and amateurish, interesting to researchers only because of defying "the bourgeois platitude". Contrarily, another interwar exegete, Perpessicius, made ample efforts to rehabilitate Urmuz as a thoughtful literary figure with "great creative verve", on the same level as Arghezi and poet Adrian Maniu.

Ciprian noted that Urmuz was unlike the "cheeky, daring, disorganized" pranksters whom he superficially resembled, that nothing in Urmuz's exterior gave the impression that he was in any way "spoiled". Time, he suggests, did not alter Urumuz's "attitude on life": "Only now the about-turns were more daring and the tightrope acts was much more savvy." In 1925, commenting on Urmuz's flair for depicting the "overall pointlessness of [human] existence", Ciprian also argued: "For the mediocre mindset, [Urmuz] may seem incoherent and unbalanced—which is why his work is not addressed to the masses." Critic Adrian G. Romilă writes that the new "paradigm" in Urmuz's literary universe appears significant and laborious, but adds: "That which we do not know is if the writer [...] wasn't purely and simply playing around." However, Ioana Pârvulescu assessed that Urmuz, an author of "extreme originality", "put his own life into play and games [...] and that is why his work is more tragic than comedic or is nested in that no man's land where tragedy and comedy overlap."

Crohmălniceanu sees in the Bizarre Pages indication of a "singular" and tragic experience, while Geo Șerban argues that Urmuz's "verve" comes from destructive pressures on his own psychology. Reviewer Simona Vasilache also suggests that the Bizarre Pages hide a "long digested" rage, with serious and even dramatic undertones. Other essayists have spoken about Urmuz's "cruelty" in depicting anguishing situations, in criticizing social life and in using language stripped of its metaphors; they call him "one of the cruelest authors I ever did read" (Eugène Ionesco) and "cruel in a primitive sense" (Irina Ungureanu). As Ciprian reports, Urmuz was also self-deprecatory, amused by the others' attention, and claiming that his own elucubrații ("phantasmagorias") could only still be used to "trip the seminary brethren". One of his aphorisms hints to his internal drama and its role in creation: "There are cases when God can only help you by giving you more and more suffering."

=== Kafka, Jarry and "antiliterature" ===
Among those who describe Urmuz as more of an individual rebel than an avant-garde hero, several have come to regard him as the Romanian parallel of solitary intellectuals who likewise made an impact on 20th-century literature. In the decades after his death, Romanian reviewers started comparing him to Czechoslovakia's Franz Kafka, a parallel which was still being supported in the 21st century. According to Romilă, Urmuzian and Kafkaesque literature are both about dehumanization, in Urmuz's case with a predilection for mechanical oddities which colonize and modify human existence. Other frequent analogies rank Urmuz together with Alfred Jarry, the French proto-Dadaist and inventor of 'Pataphysics. He was also described as an equivalent of Anglophone nonsense writers (Edward Lear, Lewis Carroll). Elsewhere, he is paralleled with Russia's Daniil Kharms, or modernist Poles from Bruno Schulz to Stanisław Ignacy Witkiewicz. Those who speak about his fundamental conservatism or his humorist's talent have also likened Urmuz and the Bizarre Pages to Gustave Flaubert and his sarcastic Dictionary of Received Ideas. At the other end, those who focus on Urmuz's bizarre and sad metamorphoses have paralleled his work to Tim Burton's Oyster Boy stories.

A major disagreement among critics relates to Urmuz's ambiguous positioning, between literature, antiliterature and metafiction. In reference to the Bizarre Pages, Crohmălniceanu introduced the term "antiprose". In Crohmălniceanu's view, the antiliterary "device" Urmuz invented is impersonal and regulated, in the manner of Dada "readymades", but as such ingenious and therefore inimitable. Authors such as Adrian Marino, Eugen Negrici, Lucian Raicu and Mircea Scarlat have spoken about Urmuz as a revolutionist of language, who liberated texts from coherence and even semantics; whereas others—Livius Ciocârlie, Radu Petrescu, Ion Pop, Nicolae Manolescu, Marin Mincu, Mihai Zamfir—have regarded him as mainly a textualist, interested in reusing and redefining the limits of poetry or narration, but creating a coherent, if personal, universe. According to Vasile Andru, Urmuzian literature is by definition open to all these associations, its antiliterary aspects illustrating the modern gap between "nature and nurture". Critic C. Trandafir, who sees Urmuz's apparent textualism as canceled out by deeper meanings in his prose, writes: "The man who wrote the 'bizarre pages' had a clear critical awareness of the transformations needed within literary discourse."

=== Esoteric layers ===
As Vasile Voiculescu recalls, Urmuz had been genuinely "tormented by metaphysical matters". Some of Urmuz's commentators therefore discussed him as a reader of the unconscious mind or propagator of esoteric knowledge, suggesting that a hidden layer of mystical symbolism can be discerned in all his activities. According to Perpessicius, the Bizarre Pages as a whole carry a subtext of mythopoeia, or "fragments of a new mythology". Boz also drew a comparison between Urmuz and the morose poems of George Bacovia, arguing that they both send the reader on "tragic explorations" and "journeys to the underworld". In Boz's interpretation, Urmuz was not at all a humorist, but rather one who issued a solitary "call to order" and, creating a "magical phenomenon", elevated his reader above the realities of the flesh. He first discussed the connection between the Bizarre Pages and 1930s Surrealism, which likewise turned its attention to the abnormal psychology, to "psychosis" and "dementia". The theoretical proto-Surrealism of such works, which places less importance on their topical humor, has generated a long debate between scholars later in the 20th century: some have denied Urmuzian Surrealism, whereas others have continued to identify him as the earliest Romanian Surrealist.

Simona Popescu, the poet-essayist, presumes that Urmuz's inner motivation was his "psycho-mania", which holds no respect for either convention or posterity, but only for committing one's own "abyssal obsessions" to paper: "death, the Eros, creation, and destruction." Adrian Lăcătuș also makes note of Urmuz's ambiguous allusions to autoeroticism, incest, bisexuality or paraphilia. Additionally, various commentators suggest that Urmuz's creative spark hides an unresolved conflict with his father. According to Cernat, Urmuz was in conflict with "paternal authority" and more attached to his mother, an "Oedipus complex" also found in some other literary figures of the pre-modernist generation. Others too see in Ciriviș's pranks a planned revenge against parental and social pressures. His sister Eliza credited such accounts, by noting: "You can tell he failed in life because he obeyed his parents blindly, and perhaps also in part due to his lack of will, his shyness, his fear of the public."

Urmuz the aphorist genuinely trusted that the "Soul" of the world was a unity of opposites, and, inspired by the philosophy of Henri Bergson, also spoke of a "universal vital flux". Lăcătuș and others suggest that Urmuz's worldview is the modern correspondent of Gnosticism and Manichaeism: in one of the manuscripts he left behind, Urmuz speculates about there being two Gods, one good and one evil. A distinct, and disputed, interpretation was put forth by researcher Radu Cernătescu, who believes that Urmuz's life and work reflected the doctrine of Freemasonry. Cernătescu reads indications of Masonic "awakening" throughout Urmuz's stories, and notes that the pahuci brotherhood was probably the junior or parody version of a Romanian Masonic Lodge.

== Works ==
=== Early prose ===
Definitions vary in respect to the exact nature and species of Urmuz's experimental works, which are prose-like in content. Ciprian simply assessed that Urmuz's pieces "do not belong to any literary genre." In line with his comments about the mythological layer of Urmuz's work, Perpessicius suggested that Urmuz created "new fairy tales" and "fantasy sketches". This intuition was given endorsement by other scholars, who included the Bizarre Pages in anthologies of Romanian fantasy literature. Contrarily, Boz found that Urmuz was "the poet of transcendental absurdity", "the reformer of Romanian poetry", and the counterpart of Romania's national poet, Mihai Eminescu. The Eminescu-Urmuz comparison, which put aside all their differences in style and vision, was a favorite of avant-garde authors, and, late in the century, served to inspire sympathetic academics such as Marin Mincu.

According to Ciprian, one of Urmuz's earliest prose fragments was composed, with "The Chroniclers", during pahuci escapades. Its opening words, Ciprian recalls, were: "The deputy arrived in a brick and tile cart. He was bringing no news, but offered his friends, upon arrival, a few Leclanché batteries". The same author suggests that these drafts were much inferior to Urmuz's published works, beginning with "Algazy & Grummer".

In its definitive version, the Algazy piece offers a glimpse into the strange life and cannibalistic death of its storekeeper characters: Algazy, "a nice old man" with his beard "neatly laid out on a grill [...] surrounded by barbed wire", "does not speak any European languages" and feeds on municipal waste; Grummer, who has "a bilious temper" and "a beak of aromatic wood", spends most time lying under the counter, but sometimes assaults customers in the middle of conversations about sports or literature. When Algazy discovers that his associate has digested, without giving a thought to sharing, "all that was good in literature", he takes his revenge by consuming Grummer's rubbery bladder. A race begins as to who can eat the other first. Their few remains are later discovered by the authorities, and one of Algazy's many wives sweeps them up into oblivion. A different, early variant is quoted "from memory" and commented in Ciprian. In this account, Algazy the storekeeper is persuaded by his domineering wife to make their only son a magistrate. Grummer prepares the boy for his unexpected novitiate, strapping him down to the floor of a cave that must have the scent of colts.

From its very title, "Algazy & Grummer" references a defunct firm of suitcase manufacturers. Urmuz's own note to the text apologizes for this, explaining that the names' "musicality" is more suited to the two fictional characters than to their real-life models, and suggesting that the company should change name (or that its patrons must adapt their physical shape accordingly). The narrative may hint to the everyday tensions between these entrepreneurs, and perhaps to the boredom of a career in sales; according to philologist Simona Constantinovici, it is also the confrontation of an entrepreneurial Turk (Algazy) and an intellectual Jew (Grummer), represented as a fight between the ostrich and the platypus. Beyond the mundane pretext, the story was often described as Urmuz's manifesto against any literary technique, and even a witty meditation on the signified and signifier. Carmen Blaga further proposes that Urmuz philosophic intent is to show the gap between universe, in which all things are possible and random, and man, who demands familiarity and structure.

=== "Ismaïl and Turnavitu" ===
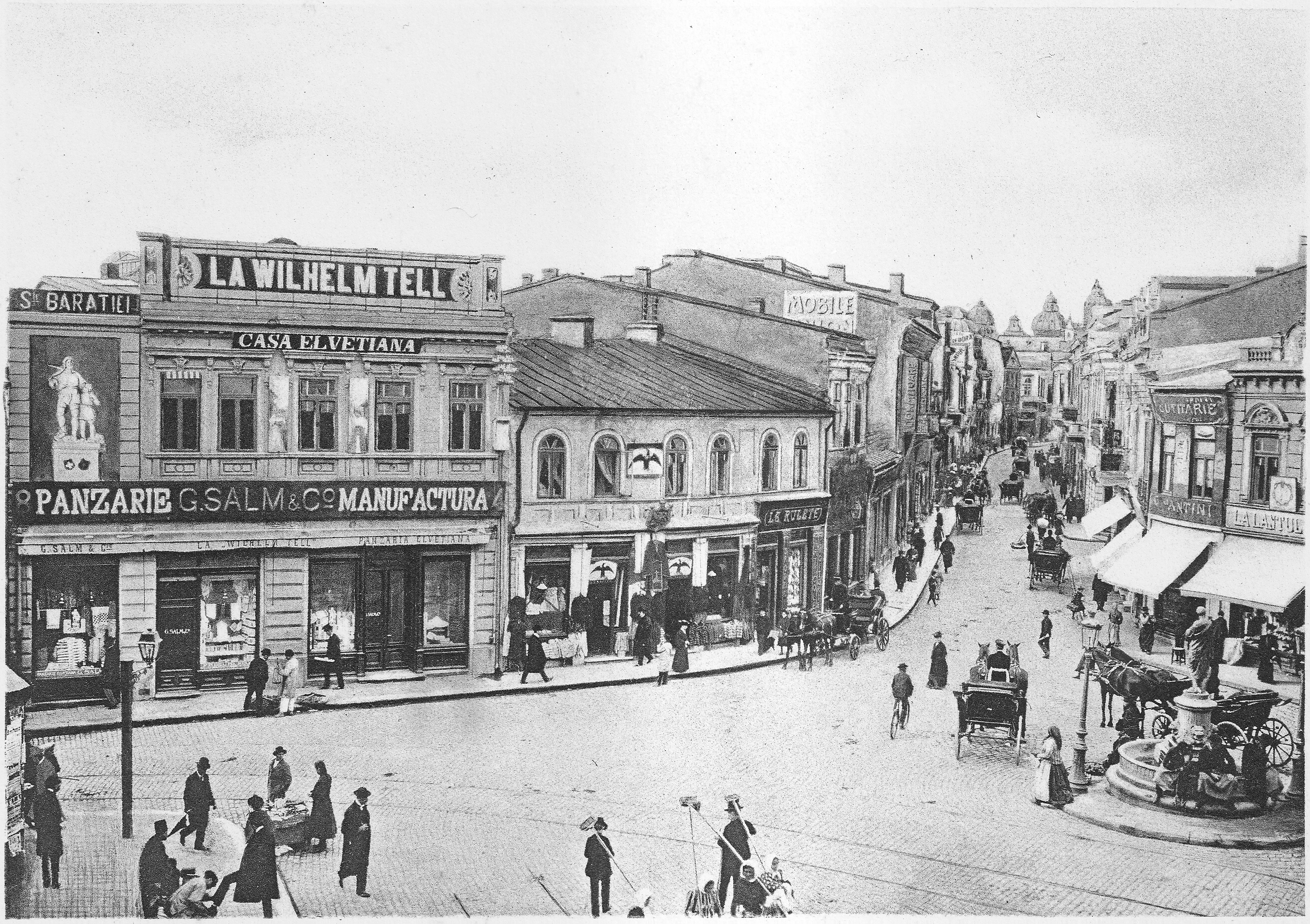
Lipscani shops around 1900. Photograph by Alexandru Antoniu

In "Ismaïl and Turnavitu", Urmuz further explores the bizarre in its everyday settings. This was noted by Ciprian: "[Urmuz] waged war on nature, he created besides nature and against its laws. He was a solitary summit defying heaven and asking: That's all? [...] Always the same slopes? the same compasses? the same people? the same beards?" The result, Sandqvist writes, is "breakneck, absurd, and inordinately grotesque." Călinescu singled out the work: "The best of his absurd pieces is 'Ismaïl and Turnavitu', the solemnly academic portraiture and parody of bourgeois mannerisms, where there's always a confusion being made between the three kingdoms, the animal, the vegetal and the mineral".

Ismaïl "is made up of eyes, sideburns, and a dress", tied with rope to a badger and stumbling down Arionoaia Street. Protected from "legal responsibility" in the country ("a seed-bed at the bottom of a hole in Dobruja"), the creature raises an entire badger colony: some he eats raw, with lemon; the others, once they have turned sixteen, he rapes "without the smallest qualm of conscience." The seed-bed is where Ismaïl also interviews job applicants, received on the condition that they hatch him "four eggs each". The process is supported by his "chamberlain" Turnavitu, who exchanges love letters with the applicants. Ismaïl's actual residence is kept a secret, but it is presumed that he lives, sequestered from "the corruption of electoral mores", in an attic above the home of his grotesquely disfigured father, only to emerge in a ball gown for the yearly celebration of plaster. He then offers his body to the workers, in hopes of thus resolving "the labor issue". Whereas Ismaïl has once worked as an air fan for "dirty Greek coffee houses" in the Lipscani quarter, Turnavitu has a past in "politics": he was for long the government-appointed air fan at the fire precinct kitchen. Ismaïl has spared Turnavitu a life of near constant rotation, remunerating his services: the seed-bed interviews, the ritualized apologizes to the leashed badgers, the praise of Ismaïl's fashion sense, and the swabbing of canola over Ismaïl's gowns. Their relationship breaks down as Turnavitu, returning from the Balearic Islands in the form of a jerrycan, passes the common cold to Ismaïl's badgers. Sacked from his job, he contemplates suicide ("not before seeing to the extraction of four canines in his mouth"), and hurls himself into a pyre made up of Ismaïl's dresses; the patron falls into depression and "decrepitude", retreating to his seed-bed for the rest of his own life.

Like "Algazy & Grummer", "Ismaïl and Turnavitu" probably has a skeletal structure borrowed from real life: Turnavitu was a distinguished clan within Bucharest's Greek nobility, tracing its origin back to the Phanariote era. The semi-fictional world is populated by other symbols of Romania's connection to the Orient, that are meant to evoke "the banality of a distinctively Balkan scenery" (Carmen Blaga). Other interpretations have seen in the two protagonists caricatures of political corruption and parvenu morals.

=== "The Funnel and Stamate" ===
"The Funnel and Stamate" insists on the geographical setting of Urmuzian misadventures. Stamate's townhouse is a haven for objects or beings, their presence inventoried over several rooms. Only accessible through a tube, the windowless first room holds together a sample of the thing-in-itself, the statue of a Transylvanian priest and grammarian, and two humans always "in the process of descending from the ape". The second room, decorated in "Turkish style" and "eastern luxury", is painted once a day and carefully measured, by compass, to prevent shrinkage. A third section, under the "Turkish" room, houses a limitless canal, a tiny room and a stake "to which the entire Stamate family is tethered." The "dignified" and "elliptical" head of the clan spits chewed-up celluloid on his fat boy Bufty, who "pretends not to notice". For relaxation, the Stamates contemplate Nirvana, located over the canal and "in the same precinct" as them. Old Stamate's musings are interrupted by the provocative intrusion of a siren, who lures him into the deep by presenting him with "an innocent and too decent looking funnel." Stamate returns "a better and more tolerant man", deciding to use the funnel for both the pleasures of sex and those of science. Neglecting his family duties, he goes on nightly expeditions into the funnel, until he discovers in horror that Bufty uses the funnel for a similar purpose. Stamate then decides to part with his wife (sewing her in a bag, to "preserve the cultural traditions of his family") and with Bufty: trapped in the funnel, the boy is sent over to Nirvana, where Stamate makes sure he becomes a "bureau sub-chief". Stamate is left alone to contemplate his plight, wandering to and fro at great speed, and submerging "into micro-infinity."

As an early supporter of Urmuz, Ciprian spoke of "The Funnel and Stamate" as "without parallel" in its satire of family life, suggesting that the scene were all the Stamates are tied to a single stake is "more evocative than hundreds of pages from a novel" (part of the story has also been read as a sexist joke on fashionable androgyny, since Stamate has a "tonsured and legitimate wife"). Urmuz's original version in fact carries the subtitle "A Four-Part Novel", in which Paul Cernat reads the intention of parodying the staple genres of traditional literature; according to Ioana Pârvulescu, the definition needs to be taken seriously, and makes the text ("perhaps the shortest [novel] in European literature") a "microscopic" Romanian equivalent of modernist works by James Joyce. Linguist Anca Davidoiu-Roman notes: "Urmuz's antinovel [...] apparently preserves the structures of the novelistic genre, but undermines them from the inside, cultivating the absurd, the black humor, [...] the nonsensical and the zeugma." The core theme is believed to be sexual: a paraphrase of Romeo and Juliet, with Stamate as the ridiculously abstract thinker falling for the debased stand-in of femininity; or even the detailed creation of "an aberrant mechanism for erotic gratification." Stamate himself is also described as standing in for "the unimaginative bourgeois".

=== "The Fuchsiad" ===
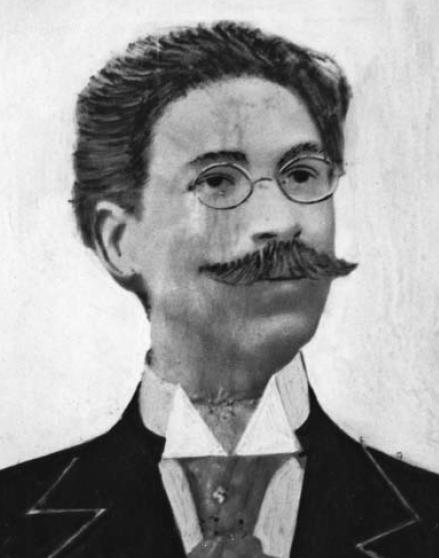
Photograph of Theodor Fuchs, ca. 1900

Another one of Urmuz's prose creations is "The Fuchsiad", subtitled "An Heroic-Erotic Musical Poem in Prose". Among the scholars, Perpessicius was first to argue that the subtext here is a direct reference to Greek mythology and Norse paganism, re-contextualized "with the sadistic pleasure of children who take apart their dolls". The protagonist Fuchs is an eminently musical creature, who came into the world not out of his mother's womb, but through his grandmother's ear. At the conservatory, he turns into "the perfect chord", but out of modesty spends most of his education hiding at the bottom of a piano. Puberty comes and he grows "some kind of genitalia"—in fact a "fig leaf" which keeps rejuvenating. The actual story begins on the one night Fuchs spends in the open air: under the spell of its mysteries, the composer finds his way into Traian Street (Bucharest's red-light district).

There, a group of "vestals" whisks him away, praying to be shown the beauty of "immaterial love" and begging him to play a sonata. His music is overheard by the goddess Venus. Instantly "defeated by passion", she asks Fuchs to join her on Mount Olympus. The act of lovemaking between clueless, overanxious Fuchs and the giant goddess is compromised when Fuchs decides to enter his whole body into Venus' ear. The embarrassed and angered audience humiliates the guest and banishes him to the planet Venus; merciful Athena allows him to return home, but on condition he does not reproduce. However, Fuchs still decides to spend some of his time practicing his lovemaking on Traian Street, hoping that Venus will grant him a second chance, and believing that he and the goddess could breed a race of Supermen. In the end, the prostitutes also reject his advances, deeming him a "dirty satyr", no longer capable of immaterial love. The story ends with Fuchs' flight into "boundless nature", whence his music "has been beaming away with equal force in all directions", fulfilling his destiny as an enemy of inferior art.

Urmuz's story has been variously described as his praise of artistic freedom, and more precisely as an ironic take on his own biography as a failed musician. On a more transparent level, it references classical composer Theodor Fuchs, depicted by posterity as a "puberal" and "clumsy" man, and known as a disgraced favorite of Romanian Queen-Consort Elisabeth of Wied. "The Fuchsiad" may also contain intertextual nods to A Midsummer Night's Dream.

=== "Emil Gayk" and "Going Abroad" ===
The "Emil Gayk" sketch was the only one which is precisely dated to the early stages of World War I, focusing its satire on the debates of neutralists and interventionists. Gayk, the ever-vigilant, gun-toting, bird-like civilian, who sleeps in his tailcoat but otherwise wears only a festooned drape, swims about in just one direction ("for fear of coming out of his neutrality") and gets inspired by the military muses. His career is in foreign relations, which he revolutionizes with such novel ideas as the negotiated annexation of a unidimensional, arrow-like, territory at Năsăud—pointed toward Luxembourg, in memory of the 1914 invasion. Gayk has an adoptive daughter, educated on his behalf by waiters, who makes her home in the fields and eventually demands access to the sea. Angered by this claim, Gayk begins a large-scale war against her; the conflict ends in a stalemate, as Gayk can no longer accessorize his marshal's uniform, and the girl has lost her supplies of gasoline and beans. The father is placated with regular gifts of feed grain, whereas the daughter is allowed a two-centimeter-wide littoral.

In its subtext, "Emil Gayk" teases the irredentist ambitions of the interventionist camp, in respect to Transylvania province. Urmuz quotes a humorous slogan, circulated as a lampoon of nationalist attitudes: "Transylvania without the Transylvanians". This probably references the fact that, although Romanian by culture or ethnicity, many Transylvanian intellectuals were primarily the loyal subjects of the Habsburg monarchy. According to Crohmălniceanu, the actual purpose is to overturn "ossified" constructs, as in the case of territorial demands which cover no real surface. Similarly, Șerban speaks about "Emil Gayk" as a piece in which magnified "paltry aspects" and "anomalies" are supposed to send the reader into a "state of vigil".

The plot of "Going Abroad" depicts someone's convoluted attempt to leave the country for good. The unnamed seven-year-old "he" in the story settles his scores with the assistance of "two old ducks" and embarks for the voyage, only to be pulled back in by "paternal feelings"; he consequently isolates himself in a tiny room, where he converts to Judaism, punishes his servants, celebrates his Silver Jubilee, and rethinks his escape. His wife, jealous of his contacts with a seal, decides against it, but offers him various parting gifts: flatbread, a kite, and a sketchbook by art teacher Borgovanu. This results in a quarrel, and the protagonist finds himself tied by the cheekbones, "delivered unceremoniously on dry land." For a third attempt at leaving, the husband relinquishes wealth and titles, strips down and, bound with a bark rope, gallops to another town, joining the bar association. The story ends with a rhyming "moral":

De vreți cu toți, în timpul nopții, un somn de tihnă să gustați,
Nu faceți schimb de ilustrate cu cel primar din Cârligați.

Translation:

If forty winks is what y'all want to catch,
Exchange no postcards with that mayor in Kurlygatz.

"Going Abroad" is possibly about Urmuz's own difficulties in deciding his own fate, transposed into a faux sample of travel literature, an example of what Balotă calls the failed homo viator ("human pilgrim") in Urmuz.

=== Unclassified prose ===
Two samples of Urmuz's prose have been traditionally seen as his secondary, less relevant, contributions. These are "After the Storm" and the posthumous "A Little Metaphysics and Astronomy". In the former, an unnamed cavalier makes his way into a grim monastery, his heart moved at the sight of a pious hen; the repentant man then finds "ecstasy" in nature, leaping through the trees or releasing captive flies. Agents of the revenue service make efforts to confiscate his tree, but the protagonist is still able to squat on one of the branches after he gives proof of naturalization, and then—swimming his way through an "infected pond"—shames his adversaries into giving up their claim. Born-again as a cynic, strengthened by his affair with the hen, he heads back to his "native village" to train folks in the "art of midwifery." According to critics, "After the Storm" should be seen as a caricature of minor Romanticism, of conventional fantasy, or of travel literature. Simona Vasilache likens it to "an Odyssey covering some twenty lines", "a misalliance of heroism and pilferage" with echoes from Urmuz's hero Ion Luca Caragiale.

"A Little Metaphysics and Astronomy", which is structured like a treatise, opens with a pun on the creation narrative, postulating that God created fingerspelling before "the Word", and venturing to suggest that "the heavenly bodies", like abandoned children, are in fact nobody's creation, that their spin is really a form of attention seeking. Here, Urmuz questions the possibility of a single cause in the universe, since God's interest is in unnecessary duplications or multitudes in stars, men and fish species. Beyond the jokes on scientific pretense, Vasilache reads "A Little Metaphysics..." as a clue to Urmuz's own disillusioned worldview, which she traces back to the suicidal warnings in Urmuz's notebooks. She argues that such a melancholy and lonely diarist is in contrast with Urmuz's literary persona, as known from the Bizarre Pages. Likewise, Carmen Blaga describes the text as a sober meditation on "the tragic sense of history" and "the fall into temporality".

Among the last Urmuzian works to be discovered is "Cotadi and Dragomir". The first in the duo is a muscular but short and insect-like merchant, who wears dandruff, tortoiseshell combs, a lath armor which greatly hiders his movements, and a piano lid screwed to his buttocks. The descendant of Macedonian nobility, Cotadi feeds on ant eggs and excretes soda water, except when he corks himself to solve the "agrarian question". For fun, he lures his clients into angry conversations—these end with him banging the piano lid, which is also a urinating wall, on the shop's floor. Dragomir is long, crooked, brownish and kind-hearted; he intervenes in the disputes between Cotadi and the more stubborn customers, imposing respect with his main prop: a cardboard contraption that extends upwards from his neck. Cotadi rewards such attentions with servings of octopus, sorb-pears and paint, granting Dragomir the right to nest inside his gate wall. They plan to be buried together, "in the same hole", with French oil as a daily supply. From such an oily grave, Cotadi hopes, an olive tree plantation may spring up, to benefit of his descendants. Like "Algazy & Grummer", "Cotadi and Dragomir" can be read as alluding to the triteness of business life.

=== "The Chroniclers" ===
Written in the manner of fables, but lacking any directly interpretable message, Urmuz's "The Chroniclers" referenced Aristotle, Galileo Galilei and the turn-of-the-century Balkan insurgent Boris Sarafov (Sarafoff). Its opening lines suggest that the eponymous chroniclers, for lack of baggy pants, approach someone with the surname "Rapaport" and demand to be issued passports. The lyrical convention breaks down toward the end, which states:

Galileu scoate-o sinteză
Din redingota franceză,
Și exclamă: Sarafoff,
Servește-te de cartof!

Morală:
pelicanul sau babița.

Translation:

[...] from out his French tux
Galileo then extracts
a synthesis with a cry
"Sarafoff have another fry!"

Moral:
the pelican or the pouchbill.

Ciprian simply discussed the piece as "Urmuz's idiotic lyrics", while Călinescu found it a "pure fable, on the classical canon, but nonsensical". Cernat also described its "moral" as "empty" and "tautological", but other critics see a hidden layer of meaning in the seemingly random cultural imagery. Ion Pop, commenting on Urmuz's hypertextuality, assumes that the "pelican and pouchbill" motif comes from a book once used as teaching aid. He also suggests that the passion and hunger which ties together the various characters is in fact the thirst for freedom, for movement and for exotic settings: "Rapaport" is the Wandering Jew, Aristotle is the mentor of a great conqueror, and Galilei is invoked for his remark "And yet it moves". The mention of "Sarafoff" has been read as an indirect homage to Caragiale—whose humorous sketches helped give Sarafov a Romanian fame.

== Legacy ==
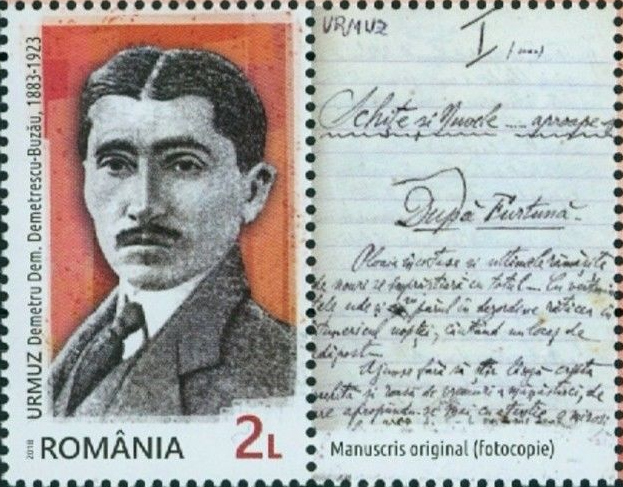
Urmuz and a copy of his writing on a 2018 postage stamp and label of Romania

=== Contimporanul circle ===
Paul Cernat notes that the Ciriviș's "posthumous destiny", leading to an unexpected glorification, was itself an "Urmuzian" affair. Cernat also cautions that the image of Urmuz as an absolute predecessor of Romanian modernism is "erroneous", since the experiments of Jarry, Charles Cros, Jules Laforgue, Edward Lear and others were just as important in its formative process. He concludes that the avant-garde "apologetes" were projecting their own expectations into the Bizarre Pages, in which they read the antithesis of "High Romanticism", and into the writer, who became Romanian version of a poète maudit. Ion Pop also suggests: "In [Urmuz's] human destiny, and in his writing too, [the avant-garde writers] find issues which trouble them as well in prefiguring their own destinies. He satisfies the pride of those who carry on with an uncertain and anxious existence, endlessly in conflict with the world..." According to Andru: "Enthusiastic, ingenious, skeptical, rhetorical, or indecent words have been uttered about [the Bizarre Pages]. People used terms having to do with the literary revolutions of the 20th century [...]. In his pages people found themes present in all the innovating actions that gained momentum especially since 1922–1924".

Cernat describes the growth of Urmuz's myth as similar to Early Christianity: Ciprian as a "prophet", Arghezi as a "baptist", the modernist aficionados as "apostles" and "converts". Over time, various exegetes have noted that the modernist aspects of Arghezi's prose, written after 1923, show his debt to Urmuz's absurdism and nonsense humor. Arghezi's Bilete de Papagal review was also a promotional instrument for the Bizarre Pages: in 1928, continuing the Cuget Românesc project, it circulated "Algazy & Grummer".

While his role as a pre-Dadaist is up for debate, Urmuz is thought by many to have been a considerable influence on a Romanian founder of Dada, Tristan Tzara. During its first years, the Romanian avant-garde would generally not mention Urmuz outside Arghezi's circle, but a surge in popularity came in stages after the European-wide impact of Dadaism, and especially after Tzara alienated some of his Romanian partners. This was the case of poet Ion Vinea and painter Marcel Janco, who together founded a modernist art magazine called Contimporanul. Late in 1924, Contimporanul teamed up with Ciprian, who gave a public reading from Urmuz during the Contimporanul International Art Exhibit.

The following year, Ciprian's eponymous text "Hurmuz", published in Contimporanul, listed the main claims about Urmuz's pioneering role. Also then, the Futurist journal Punct, a close ally of Vinea and Janco, gave exposure to various unknown Urmuzian pages. In December 1926, a Contimporanul editorial signed by Vinea announced to the world that Urmuz was "the discreet revolutionist" responsible for the reshaping of Europe's literary landscape: "Urmuz-Dada-Surrealism, these three words create a bridge, decipher a parentage, clarify the origins of the world's literary revolution in the year 1918." In its coverage of the international scene, the journal continued to suggest that the suicidal author had anticipated the literary fronde, for instance calling Michel Seuphor a writer "à la Urmuz". In addition to republishing some of the Bizarre Pages in its own issues, it took the initiative in making Urmuz known to an international audience: the Berlin-based magazine Der Sturm included samples from Urmuz in its special issue Romania (August–September 1930), reflecting a Contimporanul who's who list. At around the same time, poet Jenő Dsida completed the integral translation of the Bizarre Pages into Hungarian.

In his Contimporanul stage, Janco drew a notorious ink portrait of Urmuz. In old age, the same artist completed several cycle of engravings and paintings that alluded to the Bizarre Pages. Vinea's own prose of the 1920s was borrowing from Urmuz's style, which it merged with newer techniques from the avant-garde groups of Europe. He followed Urmuz's deceptive "novel" genre of "The Funnel and Stamate", which also became a characteristic of works by other Contimporanul writers: Felix Aderca, F. Brunea-Fox, Filip Corsa, Sergiu Dan and Romulus Dianu. In addition, Jacques G. Costin, who moved between Contimporanul and the international Dada scene, was for long thought an imitator of Urmuz's style. Several critics have nevertheless revised this verdict, noting that Costin's work builds on distinct sources, Urmuz being just one.

=== unu and the 1930s literati ===
Another stream of Urmuzianism bled into the Surrealist magazine unu. Its main contributors, including Pană, Geo Bogza, Ilarie Voronca, Ion Călugăru, Moldov and Stephan Roll, were all Urmuz enthusiasts from the far left. In 1930, Pană collected and published as a volume the complete works of Urmuz: titled Algazy & Grummer, it notably included "The Fuchsiad". Pană and Bogza visited the unpublished archive, which gave them a chance to acknowledge, but also to silence, the more conventional and antisemitic Urmuz revealed through the aphorisms. These manuscripts were kept in possession by the Pană family, and exhibited in 2009.

Bogza was previously editor of a short-lived magazine named Urmuz, published in Câmpina with support from poet Alexandru Tudor-Miu, and keeping contact with other Urmuzian circles: it was saluted by Arghezi and published a drawing portrait of Urmuz (probably Marcel Janco's). Bogza's first editorial piece proclaimed: "Urmuz lives. His presence among us whips to lash our consciousness." Later, in unu's inaugural art manifesto, Bogza described his suicidal mentor as "The Forerunner". Others in this group incorporated "Urmuzian" metamorphoses into their technique and, at that stage, the Bizarre Pages were also imitated in style by Pană's sister, Magdalena "Madda Holda" Binder, influencing stories by Pană's young follower Sesto Pals and novels by the isolated Surrealist H. Bonciu. In the mid-1930s, unu illustrator Jules Perahim drew his own version of Urmuz's portrait.

After the Contimporanul group split and a young generation reassimilated modernism into a spiritualistic framework (Trăirism), critic Lucian Boz was the first professional to find no fault with the Bizarre Pages, and made Urmuz interesting for mainstream and elitist criticism. Between the unu Surrealists and Boz's version of modernism were figures such as Ion Biberi (who popularized Urmuz in France) and Marcel Avramescu. Avramescu (better known then as Ionathan X. Uranus) was notably inspired by Urmuz's pre-Dadaist prose, which he sometimes imitated. Other authors in this succession were Grigore "Apunake" Cugler, widely credited as a 1930s Urmuz, and Constantin Fântâneru. The early 1930s also brought the publication of several new works of memoirs mentioning Demetrescu-Buzău, including texts by Cruceanu and Vasile Voiculescu—the latter was also the first to mention Urmuz on Romanian Radio (January 1932); another such Radio homage was later authored by Pană.

The channels of communication once opened, Urmuz came to be discussed with unexpected sympathy by Perpessicius, Călinescu and other noted cultural critics, consolidating his reputation as a writer. Călinescu's attitude was particularly relevant: the condescending but popularizing portrayal of Urmuz, which became part of Călinescu's 1941 companion to Romanian literature (Urmuz's earliest mention in such a synthesis), was first sketched in his literary magazine Capricorn (December 1930) and his 1938 university lectures. Although he confessed an inability to view Demetrescu-Buzău as a real writer, Călinescu preferred him over traditionalism, and, critics note, even allowed the Bizarre Pages to influence his own work as novelist. Meanwhile, a blunt negation of Urmuz's contribution was restated by the academic figure Pompiliu Constantinescu, who nevertheless commented favorably on the writer's "ingeniousness". Eugen Lovinescu, another mainstream literary theorist, angered the avant-garde by generally ignoring Urmuz, but made note of Ciprian's readings "from Hurmuz's repertoire" at the Sburătorul literary sessions.

Urmuz may have acted as a direct or indirect influence of mainstream authors of fiction, one case being that of satirist Tudor Mușatescu. Similar observations were made regarding the work of modern novelists Anișoara Odeanu or Anton Holban.

=== The Drake's Head ===
By the late 1930s, Ciprian had also established himself as a leading modernist dramatist and director, with plays such as The Man and His Mule. Although his work in the field is described as the product of 1920s Expressionist theater, he was sometimes branded a plagiarist of his dead friend's writings. This claim was traced back to Arghezi, and was probably a publicity stunt meant to increase Urmuz's exposure, but taken with seriousness by another opinion maker, journalist Constantin Beldie. The ensuing scandal was amplified by the young Dadaists and Surrealists, who took the rumor to be true: Avramescu-Uranus, himself accused of plagiarizing Urmuz, made an ironic reference to this fact in a 1929 contribution to Bilete de Papagal. Unwittingly, Arghezi's allegations cast a shadow of doubt on Ciprian's overall work for the stage.

The Drake's Head was Ciprian's personal homage to the pahuci: it shows a grown-up Ciriviș, the main protagonist, returning from a trip abroad and reuniting with his cronies during an overnight party. The Drake's Head brotherhood spends the small hours of the morning bullying passers-by, chasing them "like birds of prey" and pestering them with absurd proposals. Quite jaded and interested in wrecking the very "pillars of logic", Ciriviș convinces his friends to follow him on a more daring stunt: trespassing private property, they take over an apple tree and treat it as a new home. Claiming that land ownership only covers the actual horizontal plane, they even strike out an agreement with the stupefied owner. Nevertheless, a pompous and indignant "Bearded Gentleman" takes up the cause of propriety and incites the Romanian Police to intervene. The play premiered in early 1940. The original cast included Nicolae Băltățeanu as Ciriviș and Ion Finteșteanu as Macferlan, with additional appearances by Ion Manu, Eugenia Popovici, Chiril Economu.

Cernat sees The Drake's Head as a sample of Urmuzian mythology: "Ciriviș [...] is shown as a quasi-mythological figure, the boss of a parodic-subversive fellowship which seeks to rehabilitate a poetic, innocent, apparently absurd freedom". According to Cernat, it remains Ciprian's only truly "nonconformist" play, particularly since it is indebted to "the absurd Urmuzian comedy". Some have identified the "Bearded Gentleman" as Nicolae Iorga, the traditionalist culture critic—the claim was later dismissed as mere "innuendo" by Ciprian, who explained that his creation stood for all "demagogue" politicians of the day.

=== Communist ban and diaspora recovery ===
Upon the end of World War II, Romania came under communist rule, and a purge of interwar modernist values followed: Urmuz's works were among the many denied imprimatur by the 1950s. Before communist censorship became complete, Urmuz still found disciples in the last wave of the avant-garde. Cited examples include Geo Dumitrescu, Dimitrie Stelaru and Constant Tonegaru. Also at the time, writer Dinu Pillat donated a batch of Urmuz's manuscripts to the Romanian Academy Library.

The anti-Urmuzian current, part of a larger anti-modernist campaign, found an unexpected backer in George Călinescu, who became a fellow traveler of communism. In his new interpretation, the Bizarre Pages were depicted as farcical and entirely worthless. For a while, the Bizarre Pages were only cultivated by the Romanian diaspora. Having discovered the book in interwar Romania, the dramatist and culture critic Eugène Ionesco made it his mission to highlight the connections between Urmuz and European modernism. Ionesco's work for the stage, a major contribution to the international Theater of the Absurd movement, consciously drew upon various sources, including the Romanians Ion Luca Caragiale and Urmuz. The contextual importance of such influences, which remain relatively unknown to Ionesco's international audience, has been assessed differently by the various exegetes, as Ionesco himself once stated: "Nothing in Romanian literature has ever truly influenced me." Thanks to Ionesco's intervention, Urmuz's works saw print in Les Lettres Nouvelles journal. Allegedly, his attempt to publish Urmuz's work with Éditions Gallimard was sabotaged by Tristan Tzara, who may have feared that previous claims about his absolute originality would come under revision. Upon translating Urmuz's writings, Ionesco also drafted the essay Urmuz ou l'Anarchiste ("Urmuz or the Anarchist", ca. 1950), with a new drawing of Urmuz by Dimitrie Vârbănescu (Guy Lévis Mano collection).

The entirety of Urmuz's work was republished in English by writer Miron Grindea and his wife Carola, in ADAM Review (1967, the same year when new German translations were published in Munich's Akzente journal). From his new home in Hawaii, Romanian writer Ștefan Baciu, whose own poetry borrows from Urmuz, further popularized the Bizarre Pages with Boz's assistance. Another figure of the anti-communist diaspora, Monica Lovinescu, adopted Urmuzian aesthetics in some of her satirical essays. The diaspora community was later joined by Andrei Codrescu, who became a neo-Dadaist and wrote stories he calls "à la Urmuz".

=== From Onirism to the Optzeciști ===
In the 1950s and 1960s, a literary underground, reacting against the communist worldview, began to emerge at various locations in Romania. It tried to reconnect with modernism, and in the process rediscovered Urmuz. Inside the meta- and autofictional group known as the Târgoviște School, Urmuz's style was mainly perpetuated by Mircea Horia Simionescu. The Bizarre Pages also inspired some other writers in the same group: Radu Petrescu, Costache Olăreanu and the Bessarabian-born Tudor Țopa. Elsewhere, Urmuz's work rekindled Romania's new poetry and prose, influencing some of the Onirist and post-Surrealist writers—from Leonid Dimov, Vintilă Ivănceanu and Dumitru Țepeneag to Iordan Chimet and Emil Brumaru. An icon of neo-modernist poetry was Nichita Stănescu, whose contributions include tributes to Urmuz and pastiches of his writings, hosted by Manuscriptum in 1983. Between 1960 and 1980, the Bizarre Pages also stimulated the work of isolated modernist authors, such as Marin Sorescu, Marius Tupan, Mihai Ursachi and, especially, Șerban Foarță.

Although the ban on Urmuz was still in place, George Ciprian made a daring (and possibly subversive) gesture by publishing his affectionate memoirs in 1958. A few years later, the episodic relaxation of communist censorship allowed for the republication of the Bizarre Pages, mistakenly included in a complete edition of Ciprian's literary works (1965). Such events heralded a revival of scholarly interest in proto-Dadaism, beginning with a 1970 monograph on Urmuz, by the Sibiu Literary Circle member Nicolae Balotă. Also then, Pană was free to circulate a new revised edition of his interwar anthology, reissued in collaboration with Editura Minerva. It was later completed by an Urmuz corpus, which notably hosted the scattered diaries, as recovered by critic Gheorghe Glodeanu. In 1972, Iordan Chimet also included "The Chroniclers" in a nonconformist anthology of youth literature. In those years, the Bizarre Pages also inspired critically acclaimed illustrations by Nestor Ignat and Ion Mincu, and the multimedia event Cumpănă ("Watershed") by composer Anatol Vieru.

With the 1960s, a national-communist ideology was officially established in Romania, and this encouraged the rise of "protochronism" as a cultural phenomenon. The protochronists exaggerated past Romanian achievements, and magnified previous claims about the folkloric roots of Urmuz's literature. Some protochronists also described a positive, jocular, "village idiot" Urmuz, more presentable than Europe's misanthropic avant-garde. A leading representative of this trend was literary theorist Edgar Papu, who exaggerated Vinea and Ionesco's homage to Urmuz and Caragiale to argue that Romania was the actual origin of Europe's avant-garde movements. The idea proved popular beyond protochronism, and was arguably found in essays by Nichita Stănescu and Marin Mincu. Many Europeanist intellectuals rejected protochronism, but, in their bid of making Urmuz palatable to cultural officials, often interpreted him strictly through the grid of Marxist humanism (as used by Balotă, Matei Călinescu or Nicolae Manolescu). A third camp, comprising more or less vehement opponents of Urmuz, joined the literary debates after 1970; it includes Alexandru George, Gelu Ionescu, Alexandru Piru and Marin Nițescu.

Some years later, Romania witnessed the birth of the Optzeciști generation, whose interest was in recovering Caragiale, Urmuz and the 1930s avant-garde as its models to follow, and who reactivated corrosive humor as a way of fighting oppression. Among the individual Optzeciști who took special inspiration from the Bizarre Pages are Mircea Cărtărescu, Nichita Danilov, Florin Iaru, Ion Stratan and "the sentimental Urmuz" Florin Toma. Dissident poet Mircea Dinescu also paid homage to Urmuz, imitating his style in one of his addresses to the communist censors.

With that, the influence of Urmuz again radiated outside the Romanian-speaking circles: while poet Oskar Pastior translated the Bizarre Pages into German, Herta Müller, a German Romanian novelist and dissident, is thought to have been influenced by some of Urmuz's writing techniques. Marin Mincu and Marco Cugno also introduced Urmuz's literature to the Italophone public, with a 1980 collection. In Romania, as part of centennial celebrations, scattered translations old and new were issued by Minerva as a hexalingual album, with noted contributions from Ionesco, Voronca, Mincu, Cugno, Leopold Kosch, Andrei Bantaș etc. Other translations from Urmuz were pioneered in English by Stavros Deligiorgis (standard bilingual edition, 1985) and later by Julian Semilian. The same effort was undertaken in Dutch by Jan Willem Bos and in Swedish by Dan Shafran.

=== Postmodern Urmuzianism ===
A noted rise in interest for Urmuzian literature followed in the wake of the 1989 Revolution. In 2011, a poll among Romanian literati, organized by Observator Cultural review, listed "The Funnel and Stamate" as the 22nd-best Romanian novel; this rekindled polemics about whether the work should even be considered a novel. With the appearance of new "alternative" schoolbooks during the 1990s, Urmuz earned more exposure as an optional addition to the standard curriculum. New editions of his various works were published at a fast rate, in both Romania and neighboring Moldova: in just two years (2008–2009), there were three separate print versions of his collected texts, academic as well as paperback, and two audiobooks. These texts provided visual inspiration for Dan Perjovschi, whose tribute "pictograms" were included in the 2009 Editura Cartier reprint of the Bizarre Pages. In March 2006, Curtea de Argeș city honored the writer with a series of special events and displays.

The literary currents of postmodernism often appropriated Urmuz as their guide. This tendency was illustrated by the writings of new figures in Romanian literature: the minimalists and neo-naturalists (Sorin Gherguț, Andrei Mocuța, Călin Torsan), the neo-Surrealists (Cristian Popescu, Iulia Militaru, Cosmin Perța, Iulian Tănase, Stelian Tănase), the feminists (Catrinel Popa, Iaromira Popovici), the political satirists (Dumitru Augustin Doman, Pavel Șușară) and the electronic literature writers (Cătălin Lazurcă).

There were also loose stage or multimedia adaptations of the Bizarre Pages, including ones by Mona Chirilă (2000), Gábor Tompa (2002), Radu Macrinici (2005), Pro Contemporania ensemble (2006), Christian Fex and Ramona Dumitrean (both 2007); Urmuz's work has also been cited as an influence by the Romanian-born dramaturge David Esrig, who has used it in workshops. A theatrical company with Urmuz's name existed for a while in Casimcea, home of the Zilele Urmuz Festival. In 2011, two separate operatic renditions of Urmuz's work were showcased by Bucharest's SIMN Festival.

== Internal links ==
- 44194 Urmuz, asteroid.
