= Stephan Roll =

Romanian poet, editor, film critic, and communist militant (1904 - 1974)

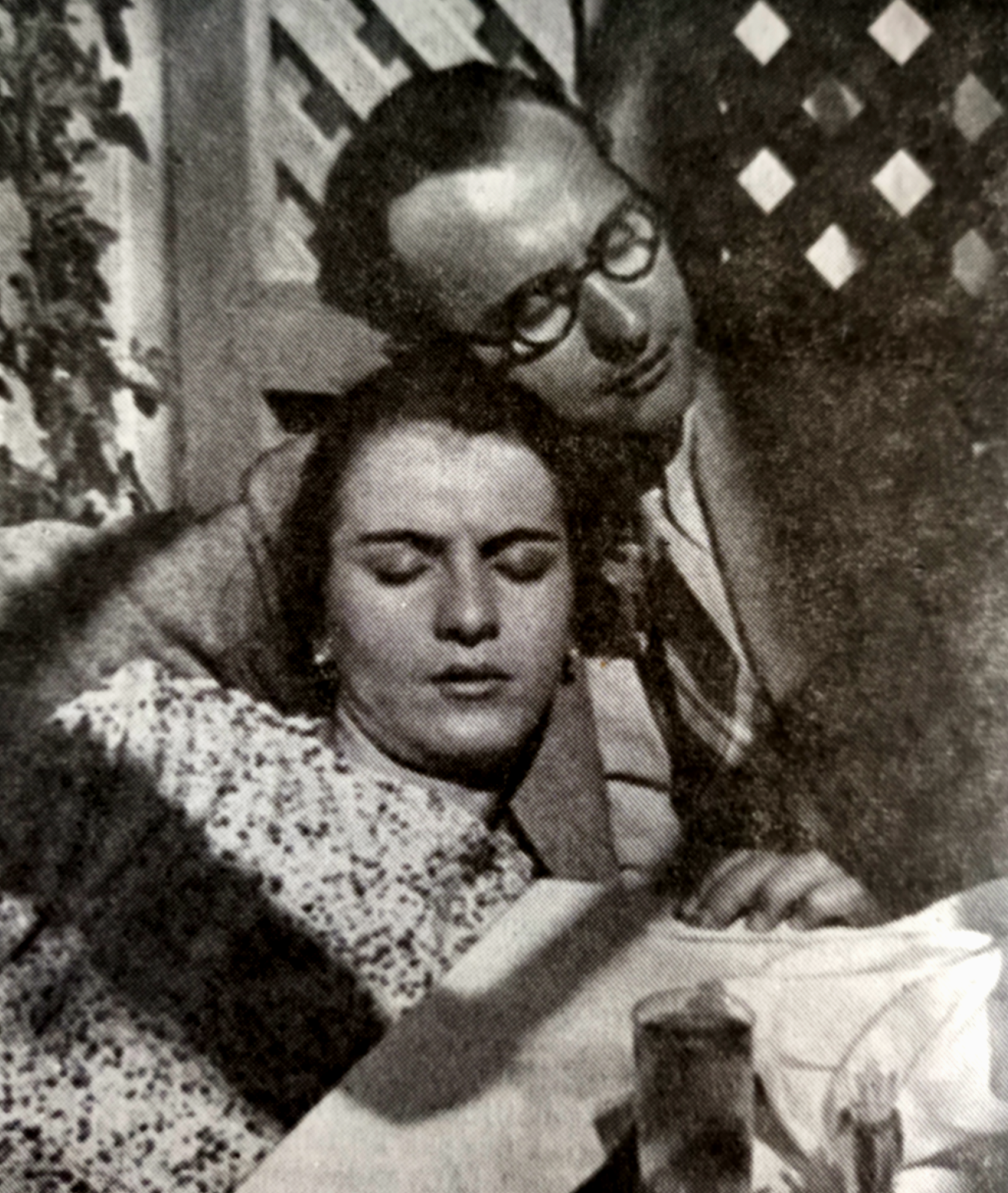
Stephan Roll with singer Maria Tănase, 1937

Stephan Roll (pen name of Gheorghe Dinu, also credited as Stéphane, Stefan or Ștefan Roll; June 5, 1904 – May 14, 1974) was a Romanian poet, editor, film critic, and communist militant. An autodidact, he played host to the Romanian avant-garde at his father's dairy shop, publishing his work in short-lived reviews and in two volumes of poetry. As one of the editors of the magazine unu, he turned from Constructivism, Futurism and jazz poetry to the more lyrical format of Surrealism. Roll's political radicalism seeped into his avant-garde activity, and produced a split inside the unu group; Roll's faction discarded Surrealism in favor of proletarian literature, and affiliated with the underground Romanian Communist Party.

An antifascist who supported groups such as Amicii URSS and promoted Soviet viewpoints, Roll worked on various leftist periodicals, including those of the Adevărul group and Cuvântul Liber. He kept a low profile during World War II, when he was employed by the daily Timpul, discreetly expressing his criticism of Nazi Germany, later contributing to the clandestine România Liberă. Reemerging under the Romanian communist regime, he became a propagandist and, in his final years, worked on reducing the avant-garde content of his debut works, republishing them in altered editions. He was survived by his painter wife, Medi Wechsler-Dinu.

== Biography ==
=== Early life and unu years ===
Roll was a native of Prekopana village in the Ottoman Empire's Manastir Vilayet; today, this is Perikopi in the Florina regional unit of Greece. His parents were Bulgarian peasants: Enache Dinu, a komitadji who fled to Bucharest in 1907, and his wife Paraschiva. His formal education consisted of four grades at the Bulgarian school in Bucharest from 1911 to 1915. As his letters show, he always had difficulties writing proper Romanian, and devised his own spelling of various words.

Dinu spent his youth in a multicultural environment, spending time in the Romanian Jewish neighborhoods, and acting as the shabbos goy, preserving links with the Zionist A. L. Zissu. From 1915 to 1929, he worked as a shop boy at his father's dairy, Lăptăria Enache (or Secolul), near the Bucharest Bărăția. His links with radical left-wing circles were documented from late 1921, when Siguranța, the Romanian Kingdom's secret police, was informed of his possible connections with the terrorist Max Goldstein.

During the 1920s, Enache's shop became a meeting place for avant-garde poets and artists such as Victor Brauner (who painted its exterior), Ilarie Voronca, and Sașa Pană. Inspired by the more senior poet Ion Vinea, the group stated its allegiance to Constructivism, and published in Vinea's Contimporanul. Together with Voronca and Brauner, Roll edited 75 H.P. magazine, which appeared for one number in October 1924. Later, he and Voronca joined Scarlat Callimachi's Punct. He signed his articles with his birth name, and his poetry as Stephan Roll, a pen name he allegedly picked up at random from a Swiss magazine, after noting that he was the only non-pseudonymous writer of his intimate circle.

Dinu worked as an editor for Integral magazine (1925–1928), where he also made his debut as a film critic, alongside Benjamin Fondane and Ion Călugăru. While visiting Câmpina in 1927, Roll met the aspiring poet Geo Bogza, who had read his Contimporanul pieces, and helped him to launch another avant-garde periodical, Urmuz (to which he also contributed). They were joined in Bucharest by the draftsman Jules Perahim, who was aged fifteen at the time, and later also by Sandu Eliad and M. H. Maxy.

From 1928 to 1932, Roll edited the magazine unu, and, according to Pană, was the "quicksilver"-like animator of its literary club. However, he also wrote for Meridian and Facla. By 1930, he and his unu colleagues had signed up to international Surrealism, and were especially interested in cultivating its automatic writing technique. As noted by Pană, Roll took this affiliation seriously, spontaneously experimenting with absurdist humor. He "very seriously" recounted stories of pseudo-zoology to an audience of fellow tram riders, insisting that giraffes owed their elongated necks to a diet of drain spouts. During that episode, unu hosted outsider literature by Petre Poppescu, a psychiatric inmate, as well as cut-out obituaries from the mainstream press. Also featured were drawings by Brauner with captions by Roll, such as their posthumous homage to Serafina, Roll's she-dog, whom he had trained to lash out at conformist authors who happened to be visiting Enache's dairy. His defense of the avant-garde led him to publish passionate pieces in defense of Bogza, who was facing trial for his highly erotic collection, Jurnal de sex, a "simulated hymn of voluptuousness and shamelessness, of a sadistic dairy, of spasm and organic inebriation".

=== Communist schism ===
According to scholar Paul Cernat, Roll and Pană publicized their "superficial adhesion" to Surrealism only because it provided expression to their dreams of political revolution. Cernat notes the same for two other unu writers, Miron Radu Paraschivescu and Claude Sernet. Already during the 1930 Bogza trial, Roll drew parallels between the calls for artistic censorship and the rise of fascism. Soon, the unu group severed its links with Vinea and Contimporanul: the latter was becoming more mainstream, more eclectic, and more tolerant of "reactionary" figures such as Filippo Tommaso Marinetti, Sandu Tudor, and Mihail Sebastian. In unu, Vinea was attacked as an "Old Man", his Constructivism denounced as opportunistic and "utilitarian". The group won a victory over Vinea by obtaining foreign support: Roll published in Der Sturm an introduction to Romanian Surrealism, followed by samples from Bogza, Fondane, Pană, and other poets. Reportedly, the moderate Der Sturm had to insist that unu radicals grant it this favor.

For his closeness to the banned Romanian Communist Party (PCdR), Roll was under constant Siguranța surveillance. He opened the magazine to PCdR cadres, publishing a book of poems by Ion Vitner, which was swiftly confiscated by the authorities. Roll had a difficult relationship with his nominal protege Bogza, offering him advice that Bogza ignored. The dairy shop went bankrupt and was eventually sold to another Bulgarian family, allegedly because Dinu supplied free meals to destitute clients.

Over the following months, Romanian Surrealism suffered a crisis, as the left-wing faction sought to expel the apolitical ones from its ranks. By 1931, Roll was writing in unu open praises to "robust life" in the Soviet Union, contrasting its five-year plans with the Great Depression. Soon after, Roll made a decisive contribution to excluding Voronca from the unu group for publishing a collection with an "official" press and applying for membership in the Romanian Writers' Society. He then attacked Surrealism itself: "yesterday's metaphysics", he noted in unu, "must be channeled into present-day scientific materialism". In his letters of the period, Voronca noted that Roll worked to destroy his and Bogza's reputation, drawing Pană closer to his communist circle. Bogza, meanwhile, sided with Voronca, which led to a definitive split. At the time, Roll also publicized his love for Marxism in his letters to the Fondane, reproaching him his "lack of a firm stance" and "refuge in an unreal world". In an early 1933 article for Cuvântul Liber, Roll expressed his support for Louis Aragon, calling Surrealism a "false avant-garde" as long as it did not tap into "the anarchic economic structure of society".

=== Between Cuvântul Liber and Reporter ===
In December 1932, Pană put out a final, suicidal, issue of unu. Roll, who remained close friends with the avant-garde reporter F. Brunea-Fox, went on to edit the newspapers Adevărul and Dimineața. From 1934 to 1938, he also put out Cuvântul Liber, signing up to the Amicii URSS society, which was a front for the PCdR. In his own definition, Cuvântul Liber stood for "the progressive left during those years of fascist exacerbation". However, Răzvan Voncu claims that, going far beyond the antifascist commitment of his unu colleagues, Roll established links with the Soviet espionage and acted as their agent of influence. PCdR records show that he was viewed with suspicion, a "fractionist" who supposedly wanted the party leadership purged of its non-Romanian cadres.

In 1934, following a clampdown on Iron Guard fascism and the PCdR alike, Roll complained to Fondane that "all publications are now being sieved through military censorship." During that year, he wrote in support of the communist unionists who were on trial for the Grivița railway strike, working with the International Red Aid and enlisting support from intellectuals such as Alexandru Ciucurencu and Jószef Meliusz. He also made occasional returns to cultural polemics, issuing a political critique of the Contimporanul artist Marcel Janco, and, befriending folklorist Harry Brauner, was among the first to hear and encourage Maria Tănase, who became Romania's leading recording star.

Around 1936, a card-carrying member of the PCdR, Dinu involved himself in rallies supporting jailed communists Iorgu Iordan and Petre Constantinescu-Iași. He was also a contributor to N. D. Cocea's Era Nouă, a PCdR-backed review, introducing the public to revolutionary works by Geo Milev. He later joined Cocea's Reporter magazine, where he contributed the film column, written from a Marxist and anti-consumerist perspective. In 1936, he and Paraschivescu were guest editors at Korunk, the Hungaro–Romanian Marxist review founded by László Dienes, publishing therein his essay on "The Formation of Romanian Intellectuals", and contributions by Tudor Arghezi, Belu Zilber, Ghiță Ionescu, Stoian Gh. Tudor, and Alexandru Sahia.

In 1937, he participated in the campaign for free speech mounted by Zaharia Stancu's Azi newspaper, defending the avant-garde's Bogza and H. Bonciu against accusations from the nationalist far-right. Also that year, he founded the satirical review Pinguinul, described by Siguranța as a "camouflaged communist organ". Publishing art by Perahim and Brauner, and texts by Bogza, it was forcefully closed down after putting our four issues. For a while, Roll entertained the idea of relaunching it under the name Pitpalacul.

From 1938 to 1940, Roll edited Stancu's Lumea Românească newspaper, where he continued to press for antifascism, alongside Bogza, George Macovescu, Petru Manoliu, and various others. Although connected with the PCdR and accepting its instructions, it was more closely aligned with the Radical Peasants' Party. During its brief existence, it published Bogza's counterattack on the traditionalists such as Stelian Popescu, exposing pornographic traits in their own press. Roll carried on with his attack on Surrealism and automatism: having already hosted Soviet attacks on psychoanalysis at Cuvântul Liber, he wrote a critical obituary for Sigmund Freud in Azi (October 1939). It denounced Freudism as the "opium of the people", a distraction from "revolutionary ardor".

=== World War II and after ===
In 1940, Roll transferred to Mircea Grigorescu's Timpul daily, his main place of employment to 1947. With the start of World War II fascism and Romania's alliance with Nazi Germany, he hid his political commitments. Sometimes with Grigorescu's blessing, he and other crypto-communists (Paraschivescu and Macovescu) published texts that hinted at their support for the Allied Powers. He was in a relationship with Medi Wechlser, a Jewish painter whom he had met ca. 1934. The racial laws prevented them from getting married, and banned Medi from artistic life.

During the National Legionary regime, Roll extended his protection to a hunted communist sympathizer, George Ivașcu. In 1943, he became one of the main contributors to Ivașcu's clandestine newspaper, România Liberă, signaling his closeness to the underground Union of Patriots. According to Dinu's own account, the newspaper was planned in his own home, with support from Medi, Macovescu, and Tereza Ungár-Macovescu.

In his forties, Stephan Roll emerged as an important figure among communist writers, and, as noted by critic Ion Pop, "enrolled himself heart and soul in support of propaganda". Shortly after the pro-Allied coup of August 1944, he rallied with the Romanian Society for Friendship with the Soviet Union, and became co-editor, with Athanase Joja, Simion Oeriu and Petre Pandrea, of its Veac Nou magazine. He wrote enthusiastic reportage pieces of his travels in the Soviet Union, including a chronicle of the Tbilisi—Spartak derby and interviews with homecoming Romanian POWs. His stated conclusion was that the "Soviet man" was "the first-class citizen of the coming world". With Stancu and Paraschivescu, he was a witness for the prosecution at the trial of journalists who had supported fascism, organized by the Romanian People's Tribunals in 1945. However, there is some indication that Roll secretly resented the communist party's policies, in particular the recruitment drive for party cadres. He is credited as having invented the one-liner: Puțini am fost, mulți am rămas ("So very few we were, so many of us remain").

Between 1947 and 1956, under the early communist regime, he edited Munca newspaper and Gazeta Literară magazine. From 1956 to 1967, he was secretary of the Newspapermen's Union. In the 1950s, he married Medi, with Pandrea as their godfather. Their marriage was childless. Dinu-Roll published his retrospective volume in 1968, Ospățul de aur ("Golden Feast"). Prefaced by Alexandru A. Philippide, it made young writers aware that the journalist and the avant-garde poet were one and the same man. However, the pieces published here were toned down by communist censorship and by Roll's own reservations, and some were heavily retouched.

Following the writer's death in 1974, his widow Medi recovered and copied the original drafts of his poems, which were published by Macovescu and Eugen Jebeleanu in Gazeta Literară. Ion Pop resumed the editorial work, and in 1986 produced a new edition that was more faithful to the original formats. The project was again taken up after the 1989 Revolution, and, in 2014, Pop ultimately produced an uncensored corpus of Roll's literary contribution. Continuing to paint, Medi made local history when, upon turning 100 in 2008, she exhibited fresh works of art.

== Literary work ==
Roll's poems successively display echoes of the main currents through which the Romanian avant-garde passed. His early "integralist" Constructivism, with its hints of Futurism and Dada, produced manifesto-like poems, odes to modern life, and samples of jazz poetry, as well as an homage to the avant-garde cult figure, Urmuz. According to Cernat, they are "urban-cosmopolitan poems, abundant in ruptures, arbitrariness, and stridency". Their "dynamic" and "synthetic" style drew attention from the modernist critic Eugen Lovinescu, who noted that Roll managed to outdo his Futurist masters in "virtuosity".

Roll's transition to Surrealism brought his recovery of earlier, more classical, poetic models. At unu, he praised the Comte de Lautréamont, Arthur Rimbaud, and Charles Baudelaire. This influence is seen in the 1929 collection Poeme în aer liber ("Outdoor Poetry") and the prose poems included in the 1930 Moartea vie a Eleonorei ("Eleonora's Living Death"), both of which came with illustrations by Victor Brauner. These more elegiac poems depict the natural universe with sensory freshness, celebrated for a particular ability for conjuring up images, which have playful, ironic and burlesque touches. One of these pieces is Diana, described by Ion Pop as "one of his most beautiful" and as proof of Roll's stylistic debt to Ilarie Voronca:

Privește: lumina e albă
ca pieptul păsărilor de mare
în corpore pitpalacii își chiuie limbile
ecoul umple gurile văzduhului și clopotele de aer

Eu sunt mai înalt decât tine cu o vrabie

Translation:

Look up: the light is white
like the breast of a seabird
a corpus of quails put strain on their tongues
their echo filling up sky-mouths and air-chimes

I am taller than you by one sparrow

In its various editions, Ospățul de aur collects both poems and essays about his generational colleagues, written in the same poetic style and brimming with imagery. The posthumous collection Baricada din călimară ("A Barricade in the Inkpot", 1979) sheds light on his activity in the 1930s as a radical-left journalist.

According to critic Răzvan Voncu, he endures in cultural memory as "a second-shelf author, albeit one whose biography and work contain, in effigy, all defining traits of the interwar avant-garde." Another reviewer, Doris Mironescu, finds him "mediocre" and "entirely unoriginal". Contrarily, Marin Mincu pays homage to Roll as Romania's "most authentic avant-garde writer", finding him superior to poets Mircea Dinescu and Ana Blandiana.
