= Punct (magazine) =

Romanian art magazine

Punct (Romanian for "Point") was a Romanian art and literary magazine published from 1924 to 1925.

== History and profile ==
Founded and directed by Scarlat Callimachi, it Punct edited by painter Victor Brauner and writer Stephan Roll. Scarlat Callimachi was the editor-in-chief of the magazine, which was published on a monthly basis. The headquarters of the magazine was in Bucharest.

The subtitle of Punct was changed three times during its existence: A Review of Constructivist Literature and Arts, A Review of International Arts and finally, A Review of Constructivist Art. Although the periodical was subtitled "A Review of Constructivist Art", it was dedicated not only to constructivism, but also covered other forms of abstract art and had strong links to Dadaism, publishing pieces by Tristan Tzara. Punct was among the leading avant-garde magazines published in Romania, a group which also comprises Contimporanul and the single issue of 75 HP.

The issues of Punct were illustrated with linocuts by Romanian artists, among them Brauner, Marcel Janco, Miliţa Petraşcu, János Mattis-Teutsch, M. H. Maxy, as well as by foreign abstractionists such as Victor Servranckx or Kurt Schwitters. Inspired by Viking Eggeling's film design, Janco also composed a formal alphabet for Punct. The magazine published literary work by Romanian writers (Roll, Ion Vinea, Ilarie Voronca and others), poems by French-language poets (Philippe Soupault, Louis Emié, Georges Linze) and articles on art by Dutch and German painters (Theo van Doesburg, Kurt Schwitters, Herwarth Walden).

Punct ceased publication in 1925 when it was merged with Contimporanul.
