= Unu =

Defunct magazine (1928–1932)

unu
- unu, cover of Issue 16 (1929). Print by Victor Brauner
- First issue: April 1928; 98 years ago
- Final issue: December 1932; 93 years ago
- Country: Romania
- Language: Romanian

unu (Romanian for "one") was an avant-garde art and literary magazine published in Romania from April 1928 to December 1932. Edited by writers Sașa Pană and Moldov, it was dedicated to Dada and Surrealism.

The first ten numbers were printed in Dorohoi, and the rest in Bucharest. The first issues were printed in 100 copies and the last in 500 copies. Issue 18 was never published and Issue 51 was never sold (published hors-commerce in 1935, it was distributed in 50 copies to guests at Moldov's wedding).

In addition to contributions Pană and Moldov, the magazine published samples from the works of Romanian and foreign avant-garde authors alike. These include Geo Bogza, Urmuz, Stephan Roll, Ilarie Voronca, Tristan Tzara, Benjamin Fondane, André Breton, Robert Desnos and Paul Éluard. unu also published graphics from Surrealist artists such as Victor Brauner.
