= Medi Dinu =

Margareta "Medi" Dinu, née Wechsler (January 4, 1909 [O.S. December 22, 1908] – July 18, 2016) was a Romanian classical painter of Jewish origin.

== Early life ==
Margareta Wechsler Dinu was born in Brezoi, Vâlcea County, the daughter of a Jewish accountant, Daniel Wechsler, and a violin player, Amalia Hirschfeld.

Due to the rise in power of the Iron Guard, at the age of 8, she was forced to leave her hometown of Brezoi and in the next few years lived in several cities: Bucharest, Târgoviște, Cluj, Oradea, Râmnicu Vâlcea. She was spared deportation due to her father's veteran status. Medi pursued her studies and graduated from the bourgeois "Choisy-Mangru" high-school in Bucharest. There she learned her fourth language, French, additionally to Romanian, German, and Hungarian. Encouraged by her arts teacher, painter Costin Petrescu, she continued her studies at the Academy of Fine Arts, under Ipolit Strâmbu and Jean Alexandru Steriadi. At the same time, she studied at the Faculty of Mathematics under Dan Barbilian and the Faculty of Philosophy under Dimitrie Gusti and Nae Ionescu.

== Career ==
Dinu debuted in 1932 at the "Official Salon of White and Black" exhibition in Bucharest, with a self-portrait. She joined the Syndicate of Artists a year later, which enabled her to travel to Balchik, a meeting place of the (mostly Jewish) avant-garde artists of the time. Between 1934 and 1939, she visited Balchik on several occasions and completed a number of works, befriending personalities such as Victor Brauner, Gellu Naum, Sașa Pană, and Geo Bogza. There she also met poet Gheorghe Dinu, who became her husband. In 1939, the mayor of Balchik, Octavian Moşescu, invited Dinu to exhibit her works alongside other artists in the city's school.

After the Second World War, Dinu was prohibited by the authoritarian Romanian Communist Party from exhibiting her art and began working as a school teacher at a Jewish school in Bucharest.

Between 1940 and 1986, she travelled and worked in various cities in Romania, Bulgaria and France. Her work remained largely unknown until 2003, when she returned to her artistic life and took part in the "Senior contemporary painters of Romanian" exhibition in Bucharest, receiving critical acclaim.

In 2008, Dinu had two exhibitions at the Museums of Art in Constanța and Tulcea, donating a part of her works to these institutions. In January 2009, at her centenarian anniversary, the National Foundation for Sciences and Art of the Romanian Academy hosted a retrospective exhibition of her work.

In 2010, she was awarded the "Victor Brauner Trophy" by the Niram Art Publishing House in Madrid.

In 2016, on International Women's Day, Dinu's works from various periods were displayed as part of the exhibition "Ages of Youth" at the "House of Arts" Cultural Center in Bucharest.

Dinu's works can be found at the municipal Museums of Art of Constanța, Tulcea, Râmnicu Vâlcea; at the Metropolitan Library "Mihail Sadoveanu", at Eminescu's Memorial in Ipotești and private collections.

== Artistic style ==
The body of her work includes pencil drawings and paintings (water colours or oil) depicting portraits, nature or marine landscapes. Her work belongs to the classical style and can be described as lyrical figurative art, en plein air, almost mathematical in simplicity, nature being stripped down to its essentials.

Even though she worked and befriended various personalities of the Romanian interbellum avant-garde, she did not approve nor understand their movement, claiming that it was disconnected from the past.

== Death ==
Dinu died on July 18, 2016, at the age of 107, at a Jewish nursing home in Bucharest. In regards to her age, at 101, she remarked that "maybe that's why God gave me so many years, to tell small things which have not been passed down."
