= Amicii URSS =

1934 Romanian cultural organisation

Amicii URSS (Romanian for "[The] Friends of the Soviet Union"; [aˈmit͡ʃij ˌureseˈse], occasionally known as Prietenii URSS ([priˈetenij ˌureseˈse]), which carries the same meaning) was a cultural association in interwar Romania, uniting left-wing and anti-fascist intellectuals who advocated a détente between their country and Joseph Stalin's Soviet Union (at a time when Greater Romania, which included Bessarabia and all of Bukovina, was engaged in a diplomatic conflict with the Soviets). Created in the spring of 1934 by Petre Constantinescu-Iași, an activist of the previously outlawed Romanian Communist Party (PCR or PCdR), the society took its inspiration from the French Amis de l'URSS and from the worldwide network (led by Henri Barbusse and Clara Zetkin). Actively encouraged and financed by the Comintern (under the provisions of the Popular Front doctrine), Amicii URSS was viewed with suspicion by authorities — never officially registered, it was eventually banned on the orders of Premier Gheorghe Tătărescu on November 25, 1934. It ceased its activity after that point, but constituted a precedent for the Romanian Society for Friendship with the Soviet Union (ARLUS).

The grouping included several early or future PCR activists. Aside from Constantinescu-Iași and the co-founders Ion Niculi and Iorgu Iordan, these were: Scarlat Callimachi, N. D. Cocea, Alexandru Sahia, Stephan Roll, Mihai Beniuc, Petre Pandrea, Teodor Bugnariu, and Mihai Popilian. Its other members were communist sympathizers, or people with no clear political views; among others, these were: Mac Constantinescu, Demostene Botez, Haig Acterian, Ioan Hudiță, Zaharia Stancu, Marcel Janco, Șerban Cioculescu, F. Brunea-Fox, Sergiu Dan, Radu Cernătescu, Octav Doicescu, Constantin Motaș, and Sandu Eliad.

== Creation and goals ==
Although a PCR section was represented at international meetings of Friends of the Soviet Union as early as 1930, the initiative to create a Romanian branch was delayed until four years after — a period during which an appeal launched by the delegation won approval in several locations throughout the country. The first meeting took place in Chișinău, in the private residence of Constantinescu-Iași (1932). Local circles of supporters were also set up in cities such as Iași, Cluj, and the capital Bucharest. The latter was also the home of another nucleus, the home of sculptor Mac Constantinescu (in the area near the present-day Sala Palatului), where correspondence and affiliations were being received.

After its creation, Amicii URSS issued a statement of purpose, publicized on July 28 as an appeal and known as Către toți muncitorii, țăranii, intelectualii de la orașe și sate ("To All Workers, Peasants, Intellectuals in Towns and Villages"). It called for an increased awareness of Soviet life, and planned to organize exhibitions, conferences, and sport events, as well as editing a magazine (which was to bear the same name as the association). Special points were made about publishing translations of Russian literature and about showcasing Soviet cinema and theater.

In 1932–1933, the PCR had ensured the creation of other outlets (focusing on rallying support in other areas of Romanian society); these were Comitetul Național Antirăzboinic (the National Anti-War Committee), Liga Muncii (the Labor League), and Comitetul Național Antifascist (the National Anti-Fascist Committee).

== Repression ==
While tipped off about the PCR-Amicii connection from before the society's creation (probably as early as 1932) and familiar with Constantinescu-Iași's dissemination of agitprop material, Siguranța (the country's secret police) failed to intervene immediately. According to historian Adrian Cioroianu, this was largely due to the tendency of tolerating the more discreet, if clandestine, manifestations of support for the Soviet cause, especially in Bessarabia (where Constantinescu-Iași was active). It was also at this time that the establishment itself sought a compromise with the Soviet state, largely due to the efforts of Foreign Affairs Minister Nicolae Titulescu (1934 was the year when diplomatic relations between the two countries were agreed upon).

In short time, however, the notoriety of the organization and its tight connections with an illegal movement enlisted a response from Romania's leadership. In September, National Liberal cabinet of Gheorghe Tătărescu, acting through Minister of the Interior Ion Inculeț, refused to allow the Amicii URSS magazine to be published (either at the original location in Bucharest or in the more isolated one it found in Pitești).

Constantinescu-Iași and Alexandru Sahia decided to visit Moscow on the occasion of the October Revolution 17th Anniversary, thus testing Romanian legislation that made crossing the border into Soviet territory illegal. The carefully organized action implied the creation of two distinct groups, headed by Constantinescu-Iași and Sahia respectively; the former, supposed to cross the Dniester, never actually left the country, while Sahia's, passing through Poland, took part in festivities at the Kremlin.

Pressures increased, with the Tribunal of Ilfov County refusing to allow the group's registration, and with several employees of universities, such as Mihai Beniuc and Teodor Bugnariu, receiving semi-official criticism for their Amicii membership. The Siguranța began routine searches at the organization headquarters, and eventually arrested Constantinescu-Iași on November 25. King Carol II also reacted against clandestine PCR activities, and drafted a Decree banning 31 political associations suspected of sedition, including Amicii URSS, Comitetul Național Antirăzboinic, Comitetul Național Antifascist, and Liga Muncii.

== Legacy ==
Without noticeable echo inside Romania, the crackdown became a cause for large protest rallies in France (organized by the Amis de l'URSS, with the noted participation of Fernand Grenier and André Malraux, as well as Victor Basch) and a formal protest of Czechoslovak intellectuals (it was signed, among others, by Karel Čapek). In early 1935, a "Committee for the Defense of Romanian Anti-Fascists" was formed in Paris under the leadership of Henri Mineur, which monitored the situation of detained communists. Aside from this intervention, Romania became a target for the activities of the International Red Aid.

Sahia's visit to Moscow was the inspiration for a reportage, URSS azi ("The USSR of Today"), in which he praised Stalinist policies at length. He died of tuberculosis in 1937.

Soon after 1934, several of the grouping's former members came to reject communism. They included Haig Acterian, who adopted fascist ideas and joined the Iron Guard, and Mac Constantinescu, who was already active inside the Criterion group, and who later became official artist for the National Renaissance Front corporatist regime.

Although the PCR did not resurrect Amicii URSS in its illegal structure, it attempted to prolong its influence by creating a succession of organizations, all of which replicated its goals; the first of these, known as Societatea pentru întreținerea raporturilor culturale dintre România și Uniunea Sovietică (the Society for Maintaining Cultural Links between Romania and the Soviet Union), was created on May 22, 1935, and notably drew support from the musician George Enescu and linguist Alexandru Rosetti. Alongside these and various former members of Amicii URSS, signers of its founding document included, among others, the lawyer Radu R. Rosetti, the academics Eugen Heroveanu and Traian Săvulescu, the visual artists Nicolae Tonitza and Jean Nițescu, the writers Victor Eftimiu and Radu Boureanu, the composers Matei Socor and Constantin Silvestri, the operatic artists Ionel Perlea and Jean Athanasiu, the architect Octav Doicescu, the theater director Soare Z. Soare, the actors Tony Bulandra, Gheorghe Timică and Ion Iancovescu, as well as the musical critics Emanoil Ciomac and Traian Șelmaru. The new organization was based in Bucharest, on Dr. Victor Poloni Street.

Among its main purposes was popularizing Soviet cinema, which it showcased in the Marconi and Trianon film theaters. During one of the shows in February 1936, the Communist Party reportedly dropped leaflets with agitprop messages. In anniversaries of the October Revolution from 1935 to 1936, the Society attempted to send representatives to the Soviet Union — notably, the 1937 project Communist activist Constantin David and workers for the Romanian Railways in Grivița. Several organized groups did leave Romania on other occasions (on May Day 1936 and later in the same year). Societatea pentru întreținerea raporturilor culturale was outlawed in February 1938.

During the early stages of World War II, when government in Romania was taken over by the Iron Guard fascist and pro-Nazi Germany movement (see National Legionary State), PCR leaders Teohari Georgescu and Lucrețiu Pătrășcanu worked together to reactivate the society, profiting from friendly relations between the new authorities and the Soviet Union; their attempt came to an abrupt end in 1941, when Ion Antonescu's triumph against the Guard provoked a collateral move against communist activists (see Legionnaires' Rebellion and Bucharest Pogrom).
