= Scarlat Callimachi =

Romanian journalist and communist activist (1896–1975)

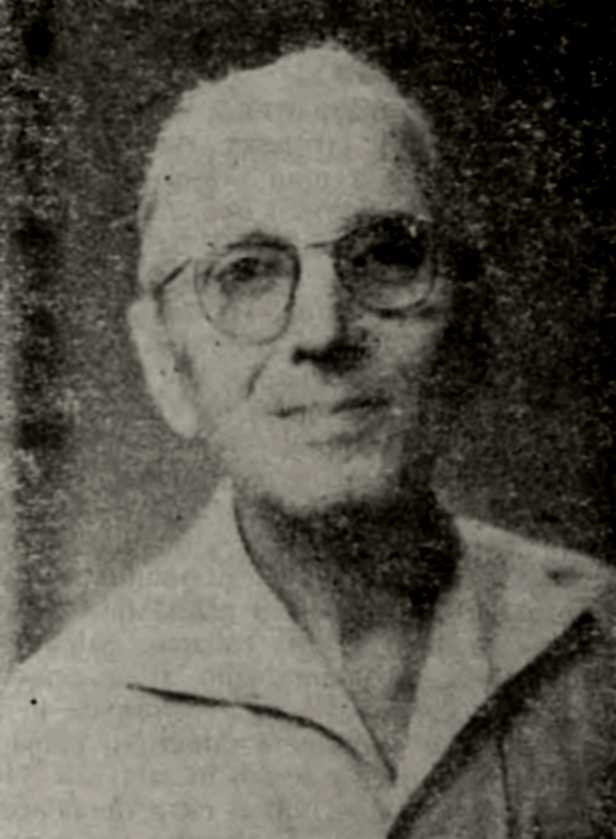
Callimachi in December 1966

Scarlat Callimachi or Calimachi (Romanian pronunciation: [skarˈlat kaliˈmaci]; nicknamed Prințul Roșu, "the Red Prince"; September 20, 1896 – June 2, 1975) was a Romanian journalist, essayist, futurist poet, trade unionist, and communist activist, a member of the Callimachi family of boyar and Phanariote lineage. He is not to be confused with his ancestor, hospodar Scarlat Callimachi.

== Biography ==
Born in Bucharest, he lived for part of his childhood at the family manor in Botoșani, where, at age 11, he witnessed first-hand the 1907 peasants' uprisings (which, as he later admitted, contributed to his left-wing sympathies). As a youth, he read Russian anarchist books, while studying in Paris during World War I, joined anarchist circles. While travelling through Finland in 1917, Callimachi attended a public meeting at which Vladimir Lenin gave a speech, and consequently adopted Bolshevism.

After his return to Romania, Callimachi edited a short-lived magazine in Botoşani (1924–1925), and published Avant-garde poems in free verse — inspired by the work of Russian Futurists. With fellow modernists Ion Vinea and Stephan Roll, he later issued the literary magazine Punct. Callimachi was also the editor-in-chief of the magazine. He began working on communist and other leftist newspapers (including Clopotul, which he himself edited in his native town) while keeping a front as an employee of his relatives.

According to his own testimony, he joined the outlawed Communist Party of Romania (PCdR, later PCR) in 1932, an allegiance which brought Callimachi into a relatively small, but dedicated, category of communist sympathisers of upper class upbringing — it also included N. D. Cocea (to whom Callimachi was a close collaborator) and Lucrețiu Pătrășcanu. Nevertheless, at the same time, he was a nominal member of the National Peasants' Party (PNȚ). He continued to criticize the PNȚ: the most virulent of his attacks on the cabinet of Alexandru Vaida-Voevod — voiced soon after the authorities had repressed the Grivița strike of 1933 — led to his arrest and sentencing.

Among PCR activists charged with establishing links with other groups (in accordance with the Popular Front Stalinist doctrine), Callimachi, who had been a member of Amicii URSS in 1934, was one of the leaders of the Democratic Bloc (Blocul Democratic), a PCR-created legal organization which in 1935 succeeded in forming a tight alliance with Petru Groza's Ploughmen's Front (the agreement was signed in Țebea).

In 1937, as the fascist Iron Guard was gaining unprecedented momentum and the secondary fascist movement around the National Christian Party was ascending to power, Callimachi decided to leave Romania and settled in France, but returned a year later, after King Carol II acted against the Iron Guard and established a dictatorship around the National Renaissance Front. In August 1940, as Carol engineered a crackdown on the left-wing opposition, he was interned in Miercurea-Ciuc.

Like Pătrășcanu, Callimachi was set free by Siguranța Statului under the National Legionary State, established by the Iron Guard later in the year (the regime, which had aligned itself with Nazi Germany, was attempting to preserve a good relationship with the Soviet Union). He was again imprisoned by Ion Antonescu's military dictatorship in Romania, and again interned, as many other PCR members, in Caracal, and later Târgu Jiu.

After World War II, he became a leader of the Singular Journalists' Trade Union, which had replaced the Union of Professional Journalists in October 1944 and had since become an instrument of the PCR-controlled government in controlling the press. He, with N. D. Cocea, Miron Constantinescu, and Ion Pas, organized the expulsion and denouncement of journalists who professed anti-communism, and maintained this position after the proclamation of the People's Republic of Romania in 1948, before moving on to become head of the Romanian-Russian Museum (Muzeul Româno-Rus), an institution created to highlight cultural and social links between Romania and the Soviet Union in accordance with the Zhdanov Doctrine. The Museum was closed down in 1956, after the Gheorghe Gheorghiu-Dej regime began rejecting Soviet influence.

He died in 1975, and was buried in the Bucharest Bellu Cemetery; he had refused the ostentatious funeral reserved for senior PCR members.
