= Portrait of the Poet Ilarie Voronca =

1925 painting by Victor Brauner

- Artist: Victor Brauner
- Year: 1925
- Medium: oil on canvas
- Dimensions: 109 cm × 70 cm (43 in × 28 in)
- Location: Visual Art Museum; Galați

Portrait of the Poet Ilarie Voronca is an oil on canvas cubist painting by Romanian artist Victor Brauner, from 1925.

== Description ==
The painting is an oil on canvas with dimensions of 109 x 70 centimeters. It is in the collection of the Visual Art Museum, in Galați. The painting's sections blend together to give the entire thing a rhythm. Strong contrasts between the red, blue, and green shapes and the clear tones (white, grey, and ochre) in harmony with the energy of the geometric shapes make up the color range.

== Analysis ==
It is a cubist portrait of the Romanian poet Ilarie Voronca. They collaborated on "picto-poèsie." He also had his portrait painted by Robert Delaunay, and Marc Chagall.
