= George Ciprian =

Romanian actor and playwright (1883–1968)

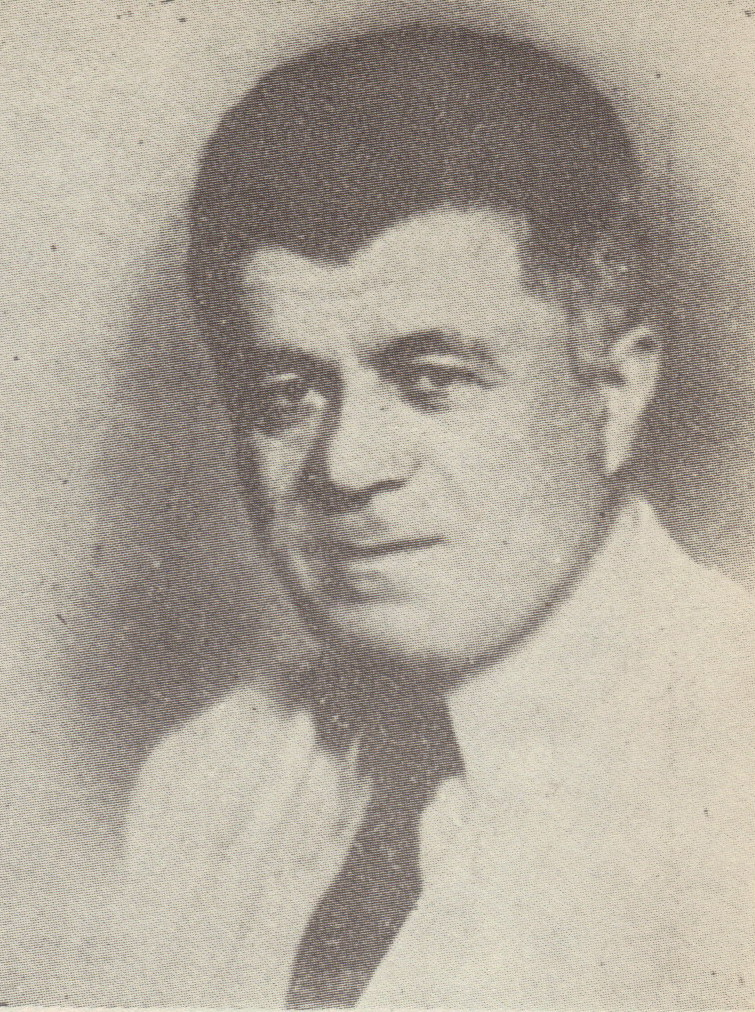
- George Ciprian
- Born: Gheorghe Pană Constantin; June 7, 1883; Buzău, Kingdom of Romania
- Died: May 8, 1968 (aged 84); Bucharest, Socialist Republic of Romania
- Resting place: Bellu Cemetery, Bucharest
- Other name: Gheorghe Constantinescu Ciprian
- Education: National University of Music Bucharest
- Occupations: Actor, playwright
- Years active: 1907–1968

George Ciprian (Romanian pronunciation: [ˈdʒe̯ordʒe tʃipriˈan]; born Gheorghe Pană Constantin [ˈɡe̯orɡe ˈpanə konstanˈtin]; June 7, 1883 – 8 May 1968) was a Romanian actor and playwright. His writings make him a precursor of the Theatre of the Absurd.

== Biography ==
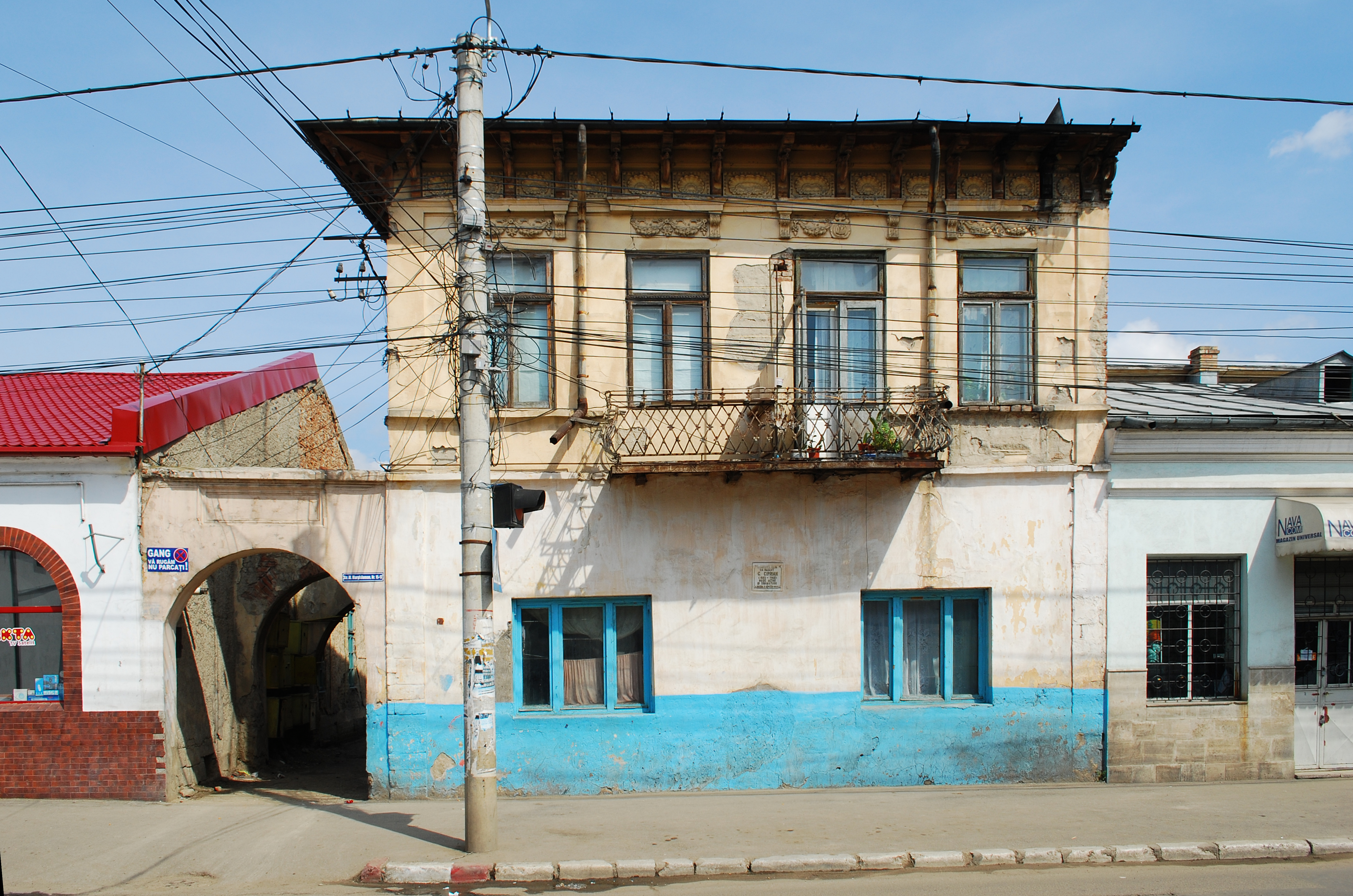
The house in Buzău where Ciprian was born

Born in Buzău to a Greek baker's family, he attended primary school in Glodeanu-Siliștea, a commune near Buzău, after which he moved to Bucharest with his mother. There, he attended Gheorghe Lazăr High School, together with Vasile Voiculescu, a future poet born near Buzău, and Urmuz, an absurdist writer.

After graduation, Ciprian went on to study acting at the Bucharest Conservatory, where he was coached by Constantin Nottara.

His stage debut took place in 1907 at the Craiova National Theatre, as Șoltuz in Bogdan Petriceicu Hasdeu's Răzvan și Vidra. He would star in many theater performances in theatres throughout Romania, and he would act in several movies.

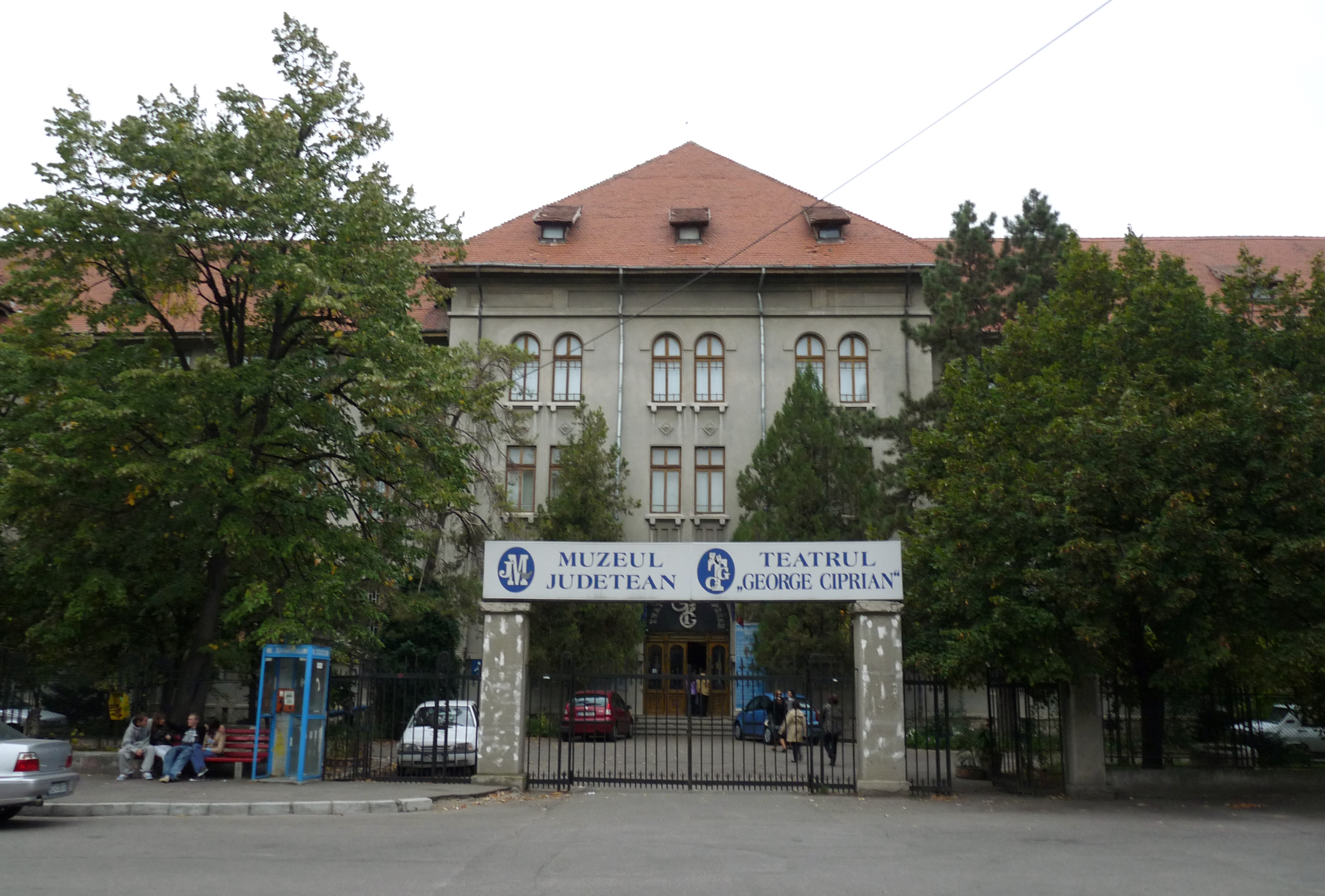
The George Ciprian Theatre, next to the Buzău County Muzeum

Ciprian died in Bucharest. The only theatre in his native city, Buzău, bears his name. The theatre was inaugurated in 1996 with a performance of Omul cu mârțoaga.

== Author ==
His first play, Omul cu mârțoaga (The Man and His Old Crock) had its premiere in 1927, and became very successful. His best known play is Capul de rățoi (The Drake's Head), written in 1938, and acknowledged as an early example of absurdist theatre. This play draws on his adolescence and friendship with Urmuz.

Late in his life, he authored an autobiography, Măscărici și Mâzgălici (translatable as "Jester and Scribbler"), which notably contains versions of several texts by Urmuz (as memorized by Ciprian), as well as details on the latter's final years.

== Works ==
- Omul cu mârțoaga (The Man and His Old Crock), 1927
- Nae Niculae, 1928
- Capul de rățoi (The Drake's Head), 1938
- Ioachim – prietenul poporului (Ioachim – Friend of the People), 1947
- Un lup mâncat de oaie (A Wolf Eaten by a Sheep), 1947
