= Sașa Pană =

Romanian writer (1902–1981)

Alexandru Binder
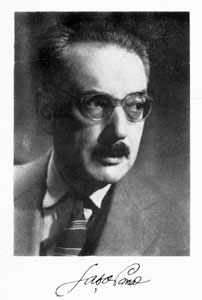
- Alexandru Binder
- Born: 8 August 1902; Bucharest, Romania
- Died: 22 August 1981 (aged 79); Bucharest, Romania
- Occupations: poet, novelist, short story writer
- Writing career
- Pen name: Sașa Pană
- Literary movement: Dada; Surrealism

Sașa Pană (Romanian pronunciation: [ˈsaʃa ˈpanə]; pen name of Alexandru Binder; 8 August 1902—22 August 1981) was a Romanian avant-garde poet, novelist, and short story writer.

== Biography ==
Born to a Jewish family in Bucharest, he trained as a physician in Iași and Bucharest, becoming a qualified combat medic in 1927. He was more interested in a literary career, which he had begun in 1925, after publishing several Symbolism-inspired poems under the title Răbojul unui muritor ("A Mortal's Tally"). He was to be more attracted to Dada themes, moving on to Surrealism soon after. Pană financed and edited the 1928 avant-garde magazine named unu (lower case was used on purpose). The magazine was the basis for a publishing house of the same name, which Pană used for printing works by the likes of Urmuz, Tristan Tzara, Stephan Roll, Ilarie Voronca, as well as his own. His prose took the form of very short pieces that merged the short story form with poem, reportage, and manifesto.

Between 1928 and 1933, unu published 50 issues, plus a special "conjugal edition" for the occasion of Moldov's wedding.

He adapted André Breton's pure psychic automatism technique to his own creations - Diagrame ("Diagrams"; 1930), Echinox orbitor ("Blinding Equinox"; 1931), Viața romanțată a lui Dumnezeu ("The Romanticized Life of God"; 1932). In later volumes such as Cuvântul talisman ("The Word-Amulet"; 1933), Călătorie cu funicularul ("Journey on the Funicular"; 1934), Sașa Pană expanded on the style, doubling automatism with apparent elegies of a more traditional format.

Many of Pană's writings were combined with drawings by notable artists such as M. H. Maxy, Man Ray, Victor Brauner, Pablo Picasso, and Marcel Janco.

He also authored the 1973 autobiography Născut în '02. Memorii, file de jurnal ("Born in 02. Memoirs and diary pages").

Pană died in Bucharest.
