= Lăptăria Enache =

Coordinates: 44°26′13.04″N 26°6′14.27″E

Lăptăria lui Enache (literally "Enache's Milk Bar") was one of the top bars in Bucharest, Romania. Located in a slightly curved space above the main halls of Bucharest National Theatre on Piaţa Universităţii (University Square, Bucharest), the bar is one of the city's best-known gathering spots and music venues. The lobby was decorated with Tristan Tzara and Dadaist memorabilia. During the summer, operations moved to an adjacent terrace (known as La Motor or La Motoare) on the roof of the theatre.

Webcasts of music from Lăptăria lui Enache occur on Friday and Saturday evenings (Eastern European Time).

== History ==
Lăptăria lui Enache dates back to 1920, when it was the meeting place for avant-garde writers in Bucharest. Back then, the bar was located on Baratiei street, near the Jewish Neighborhood in the center of Bucharest.

On 26 October 1931, Lăptăria lui Enache ceased to exist at the old address and moved to its present location.
