= Ilarie Voronca =

Romanian poet (1903–1946)

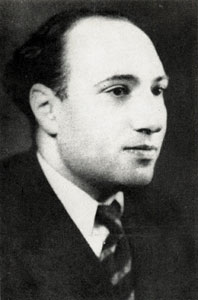
Iralie Voronca

Ilarie Voronca (pen name of Eduard Isidor Marcus; 31 December 1903, Brăila – 8 April 1946, Paris) was a Romanian avant-garde poet and essayist.

== Life and career ==
Voronca was of Jewish ethnicity. In his early years, he was connected with Eugen Lovinescu's Sburătorul group, making his debut in 1922 in the Sburătorul literar (symbolist pieces inspired by the works of George Bacovia and Camil Baltazar). Voronca's poems of the period, gloomy and passive in tone, are in marked contrast to his later works.

Only a year later, Voronca adopted a change in style, adhering to the modernist manifesto published in Contimporanul and contributing to literary magazines such as Punct and Integral. He and Stephan Roll issued a Constructivism-inspired magazine entitled 75 HP, of which only one number was ever printed.

In 1925, he collaborated with Victor Brauner on "picto-poèsie" for a portrait of himself.

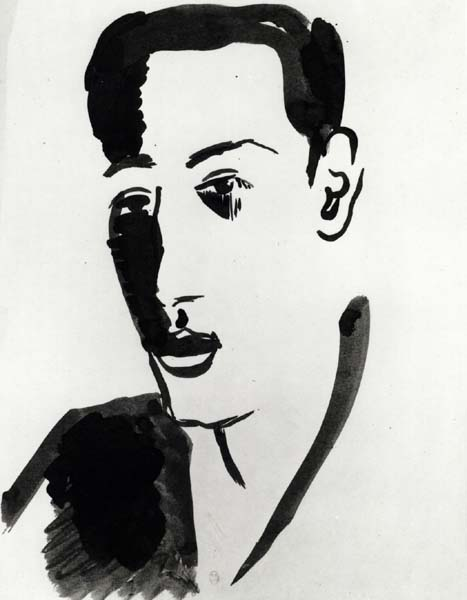
A sketch by Robert Delaunay depicting Ilarie Voronca

It is a cubist portrait of the Romanian poet Ilarie Voronca

In 1927, Voronca published a volume of poetry in Paris. Entitled Colomba after his wife Colomba Voronca, it featured two portraits drawn by Robert Delaunay. Colomba marked Voronca's new change in style: he had become a surrealist. Soon after that, his creations gained a regularity, and he was published frequently — especially after he settled in France (1933) and began writing in the French language. There followed: L'Apprenti fantôme ("The Apprentice Ghost"; 1938), Beauté de ce monde ("This World's Beauty"; 1940), Arbre ("Tree"; 1942). Several of his works were illustrated with drawings by Constantin Brâncuși, Marc Chagall, or Victor Brauner.

A French citizen in 1938, Voronca took part in the French Resistance during World War II. He visited Romania in January 1946, and was acclaimed for his writings and Anti-fascist activities. He never finished his Manuel du parfait bonheur ("Manual for Perfect Happiness"), committing suicide later in the same year.

An edition of selected poems was published in France in 1956; it was followed ten years later by prints of never-published works. Sașa Pană oversaw a Romanian edition of many of Voronca's poems in 1972.

== Translated ==
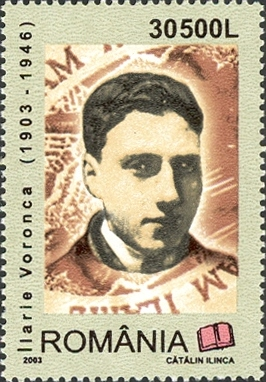
Ilarie Voronca on a 2003 Romanian stamp

- The Confession of a False Soul. A novel, Snuggly Books, 2021. Translated by Sue Boswell.
- The Key to Reality. A collection of short stories, Snuggly Books, 2022. Translated by Sue Boswell.
- Something is Still Present and Isn't, of What's Gone. A bilingual anthology of avant-garde and avant-garde inspired Romanian poetry, Aracne editrice, 2018. Edited and translated by Victor Pambuccian.
