= Max Hermann Maxy =

Romanian artist (1895–1971)

- Born: Max Hermann; October 26, 1895; Brăila, Romania
- Died: July 19, 1971 (aged 75); Bucharest, Romania
- Known for: Painting, Scenography
- Movement: Expressionism. Constructivism, Modernism

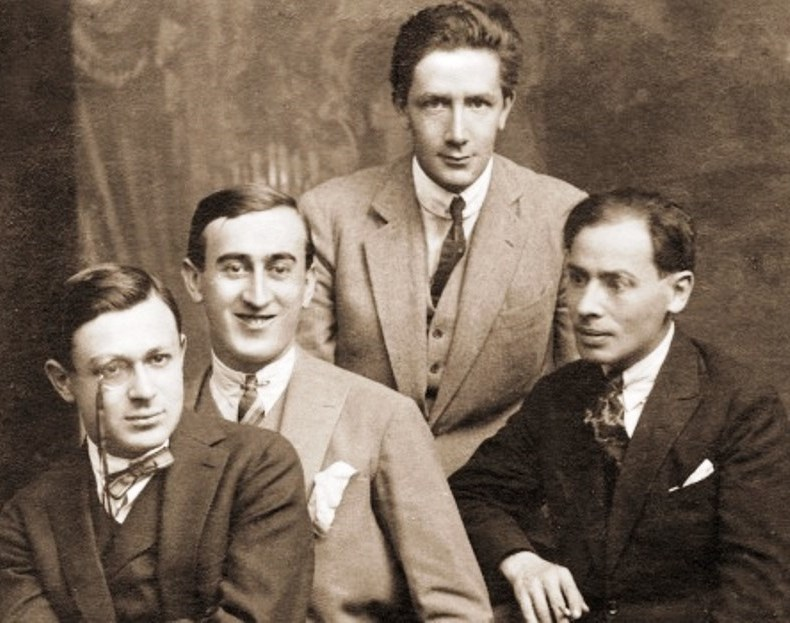
From the left: Tristan Tzara with M. H. Maxy, Ion Vinea & Jacques G. Costin

Max Hermann Maxy (also known as M. H. Maxy, born Max Herman; October 26, 1895 – July 19, 1971) was a Romanian painter, art professor, scenographer, and professor of German-Jewish descent.

== Early life and education ==
Maxy was born in Brăila in 1895, into a Jewish family. In 1902, following his mother's early death, he and his family moved to the national capital Bucharest. Between 1913 and 1916, Maxy studied at the School of Fine Arts, where Camil Ressu and Frederic Storck were among his teachers. He fought in World War I, an experience which significantly influenced his painting.

== Career ==
Maxy, along with artists Iosif Ross and Iosif Steurer, organized an art exhibit in Iași in 1918 which depicted scenes from the World War I front; it was in that year he started using the name "Maxy". In 1922 and 1923, Maxy studied in Berlin, Germany, along with another Romanian artist named Arthur Segal. During this time, he displayed some of his art in Berlin and joined the November Group, a Socialist German cultural organization which promoted expressionist art. Constructivism dominated Maxy's early works, but he later began painting in a moderate modernist style (noted for its realism and narrative mode). Throughout the 1920s and the 1930s, Maxy also displayed his art in Bucharest, often together with other artists. He became a scenographer (set designer) for the Jewish theater in Bucharest in 1939. In 1941, when anti-Jewish legislation was passed in Romania, Maxy became the director of this theater. During this time, Maxy also taught students excluded from the Romanian public education system at the private Jewish School of Arts. He became the director of the National Museum of Art of Romania and, in 1949, a university professor at the Nicolae Grigorescu Institute of Arts, as the School of Fine Arts was now called. Beginning in 1954, he received many awards from the Communist Romanian government, including the title "artist emerit" (meaning "emeritus artist"). Maxy died in Bucharest in 1971, at the age of 75. His works are shown in many Romanian art exhibits in Bucharest, Prague, Moscow, Berlin, Warsaw, Budapest, Sofia, Belgrade, Athens, Cairo, Damascus, and Istanbul.

Market (1920)

Still Life (1922)

Nude with Veil (1922)

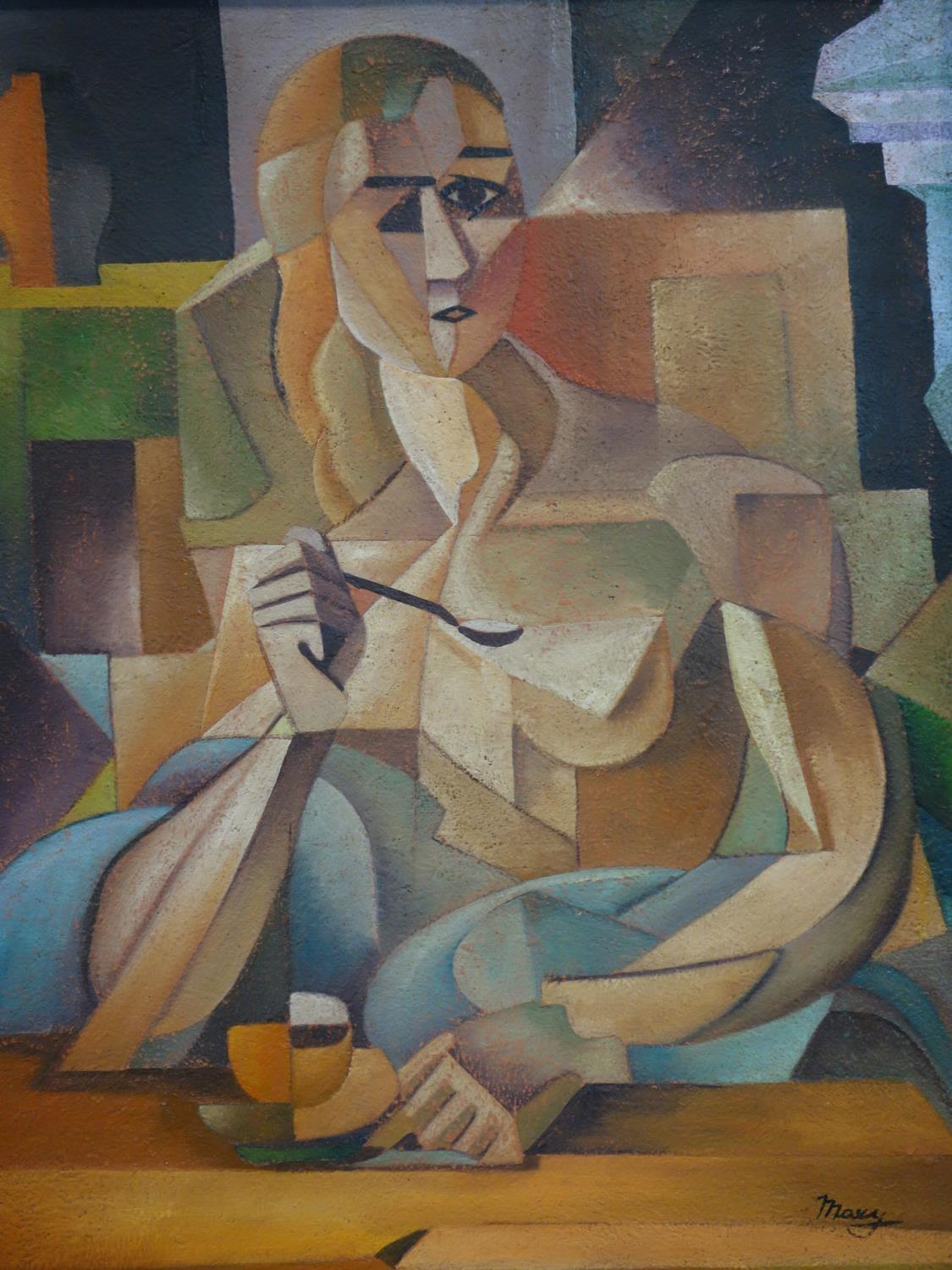
Lady Drinking Coffee
