= Sfarmă-Piatră =

Romanian fascist newspaper

Sfarmă-Piatră (pronounced [ˌsfarmə ˈpjatrə]; literally "Stone-Crusher" or "Rock-Breaker", named after one of the Uriași characters in Romanian folklore) was an antisemitic daily, monthly and later weekly newspaper, published in Romania during the late 1930s and early 1940s. One in a series of publications founded by Nichifor Crainic (better known as the head of Gândirea magazine), with support from Universul editor-in-chief Stelian Popescu, it attempted to regroup the various fascist and pro-fascist movements around Crainic's "ethnocratic" principle. The editorial staff comprised a group of far right intellectuals; alongside the editor-in-chief Alexandru Gregorian, they included Ovidiu Papadima, Vintilă Horia, Dan Botta, Dragoș Protopopescu, Toma Vlădescu, and Pan M. Vizirescu. It notably hosted contributions by writers Ioan Alexandru Brătescu-Voinești, Radu Gyr and Ștefan Baciu.

Noted for its contemptuous style of journalism and its recourse to violent language, Sfarmă-Piatră launched press campaigns against various figures who advocated left-wing or centrist positions, as well as against prominent members of the Jewish-Romanian community. Among the targets of its attacks were mainstream politicians such as Constantin Argetoianu and Constantin Stere, and the well-known writers Tudor Arghezi, Eugen Lovinescu and Mihail Sadoveanu. The publication was involved in a lengthy conflict with left-wing newspapers such as Adevărul and Dimineața, as well as with two rival voices on the far right—the National Christian Party (PNC) of Octavian Goga and A. C. Cuza, and Mihail Manoilescu's Buna Vestire.

Initially adverse to King Carol II and attempting a rapprochement with the fascist Iron Guard, it came to support Carol's National Renaissance Front after 1938. During World War II, it switched its position, offering to back to the Guard's National Legionary regime and finally to that of Conducător Ion Antonescu. The 1941 edition of Sfarmă-Piatră is remembered for welcoming Operation Barbarossa and the Iași pogrom, and for circulating antisemitic canards. The paper was ultimately shut down after Antonescu's fall in 1944, and its staff either went into hiding or was prosecuted for various political crimes.

== History ==
=== Beginnings ===
The paper was a successor to Nichifor Crainic's daily Calendarul. The latter had been shut down by the authorities in December 1933, just after Romanian Premier Ion G. Duca was murdered by the Iron Guard's Nicadori death squad. By then, Dragoș Protopopescu, the managing editor of Calendarul, had become a close associate of the Guard. Together with Protopopescu, with Cuvântul journalist Nae Ionescu, and with other far-right supporters in the press, Crainic was arrested on charges of having morally instigated the killing. They faced trial on such charges in 1934. Still, they were eventually acquitted. On the occasion, Crainic and the others publicly distanced themselves from the Guard and its leader Corneliu Zelea Codreanu, but, at various times, switched back to supporting Codreanu's politics. By then, Crainic was also putting an end to his brief association with the PNC. This was the start of internecine conflicts within Romania's radical right, highlighted when Crainic criticized Alexandru Vaida-Voevod (whose own right-wing party, the minor Romanian Front, was about to merge into the PNC).

Crainic sought to revive Calendarul, but his attempts were frustrated by successive governments down to 1938. As such, Sfarmă-Piatră saw print on November 14, 1935, once Crainic received his funding from sympathizer Stelian Popescu. In its first issue, it proclaimed a commitment to ethnic nationalism. Sfarmă-Piatră also produced a manifesto targeting corruption, stating that it was time to "obliterate those rookeries that the naive see as temples and the con artists claim are eternal", while stating that its goal was to bring down "the freckled dragons" of Romanian political life.

According to literary historian Z. Ornea, the journal was soon noted for abusing "the violent, sneering, vulgar and unsubstantial lampoon". Noting the heavy use of demeaning epithets, literary critic Ruxandra Cesereanu describes Sfarmă-Piatră and all its partners on the far right as chiefly preoccupied with "besmirching writers and public figures", while political analyst Michael Shafir summarizes its content as "viciously antisemitic". According to literary historian Nicolae Manolescu, Gregorian, Crainic's right-hand man, was from the inception "a notorious antisemite".

Sfarmă-Piatră constantly popularized the claim that Romania was subject to a Jewish invasion and featured articles in which Jews who took on Romanian-sounding names were referred to under their original ones, seeking to brand and marginalize them. It also stoked hatred against Jewish people of influence, claiming that King Carol's camarilla was in effect a Jewish dominion over Romania, and repeatedly attacking Carol's mistress, Elena Lupescu, who was of part-Jewish origin. From the moment of its creation, Sfarmă-Piatră published regular pieces against the rival journals Adevărul and Dimineața, and attempted to maintain close links with other ultra-nationalist journals: Porunca Vremii, Vremea, Curentul.

From early on, Sfarmă-Piatră also made a point of attacking the political establishment, and in particular members or former leaders of the National Peasants' Party (PNȚ): Argetoianu, Stere, Vaida-Voevod and Victor Iamandi. It specifically targeted several politicians and intellectuals (Sadoveanu, Argetoianu, Vaida-Voevod) for their known or presumed association with the Freemasonry. Through Crainic's articles, Sfarmă-Piatră also issued occasional praise for Foreign Minister Nicolae Titulescu, commending him for standing up to Hungary's revisionist designs on Romania. Titulescu had in fact intervened in favor of Calendarul men during their 1934 imprisonment.

As noted by researcher Valeriu Râpeanu, it was still unusual for a far right man to give such endorsement to the pro-democracy Titulescu. One such article portrayed him standing up to the Chamber of Deputies as if dressed "in the fiery cape of Romanian consciousness." More praise for the Foreign Minister was contributed to Sfarmă-Piatră by Dragoș Protopopescu, who may have hoped that Titulescu would assign him to a diplomatic post.

=== Sfarmă-Piatră, modernism and traditionalism ===
Sfarmă-Piatră regularly featured appeals to rescue Romanian culture from what it claimed were dangerous tendencies: modernism, the avant-garde, and the more traditional left-wing critical school, Poporanism. In 1936, under the signature of one Septimiu Bucur, it claimed that after the demise of Junimea society a generation before, Romania no longer had a decent school of literary criticism. Bucur spoke out against Poporanists such as Constantin Dobrogeanu-Gherea (a Jewish immigrant, whom he described as "alienated" from Romanian life) and Garabet Ibrăileanu (whose views he rejected as too regionalistic). Bucur focused some of his criticism on Eugen Lovinescu. An editor of Sburătorul magazine, the latter had by then abandoned his conservative position to support urban culture, modernism, and impressionistic writing. Lovinescu stood accused of having introduced "a plant with poisoned juices" to Romania's soil and of condoning "the recent invasion of kike aliens" on the national stage.

Published a year after Bucur's, Ovidiu Papadima's contributions were also turning on Lovinescu. Announcing to the world that "the era of unforgiving judgments is approaching", Papadima accused Sburătorul of having engineered "spiritual decay" within a modernist "invasion" and hoped that, like the intrusion of "foreign capital" on the local market, such ideas would be reversed. Papadima identified the enemy in both culture and economy: "the rapacious claws of the Judaic spirit." Ridiculing Lovinescu as "a desk sociologist" with "the temperament of a subdued ruminant", unable to resist "modernist dares", Papadima concluded that Jewish intellectuals were exploiting Lovinescu's vanities for their own benefit. Within the group of Lovinescu manipulators, Papadima nominated Sburătorul Jewish authors Benjamin Fondane, Camil Baltazar, Ilarie Voronca and Felix Aderca. Another such article mockingly twisted the modernist doyen's name into Oegen Lovinescu, and referred to his elder colleague Pompiliu Constantinescu as Fonfăilă Constantinescu (from fonf, "mouth-breather"). The campaign against Sburătorists became a common feature of the far right newspapers, and Sfarmă-Piatră continued to host articles where Lovinescu was denounced as "histrionic" and "the falsifier of Romanian culture".

Criticism of Mihail Sadoveanu was also regularly found in the radical right-wing press from 1936 after the novelist took on managerial offices at Adevărul and Dimineața newspapers. Sadoveanu, a traditionalist among the Poporanists, much celebrated for his historical novels, antagonized the nationalist publications when, in that context, he explicitly stated a commitment to democratic methods. Among many others, Alexandru Gregorian, denounced Sadoveanu for "betrayal", in the Sfarmă-Piatră piece M. Sadoveanu. Împărat ("M. Sadoveanu. Emperor"). Gregorian described his rival as manipulated by the Jewish entrepreneur Breuer, and, emphasizing Sadoveanu's prominent status within Romanian Freemasonry, a worshiper of both the Supreme Architect and Ucigă-l toaca (that is, the devil). His two newspapers, Gregorian claimed, were like a "ghetto", with Sadoveanu as a circumcised "aurochs of Moldavia". He also cited Sadoveanu's obesity and other alleged health issues, concluding that he was a walking "cadaver". Crainic also backed the accusation of "treason" against Sadoveanu. In a Sfarmă-Piatră article, he equated the writer with Ieremia Golia, a 16th-century boyar who had changed his allegiances between competing Moldavian rulers, and who was the villain in Sadoveanu's own novels.

=== Religious agenda and anti-"pornography" campaign ===
In opposition to modernity, the newspaper promoted a rural ethos and publicized calls for a Christian revival. Vintilă Horia was at the time noted for promoting a neo-traditionalist artistic credo. His articles for the Sfarmă-Piatră saw modern civilization as ungodly and dehumanizing, seeking a revival of the ancient ways (as illustrated by Horia's own travelogue of the Eastern Carpathians). The young writer idealized landscapes which facilitated withdrawal and contemplation, and, in one of his columns for Crainic's paper, imagined an ideal "autumnal" man: "smoke-filled, emerging from the fog, steeped in hard consonants and chafing vowels."

Crainic, a trained theologian and expert on Romanian Orthodoxy, inspired the religious agenda of his various newspapers. In 1937, Sfarmă-Piatră was seeking a rapprochement between the Orthodox believers and adherents to a rival national church, the Romanian Greek Catholics. It saluted the Greek Catholic magazine Vestitorul for promoting a "national fusion" between the two congregations, to which Vestitorul replied that the only conceivable merger was for the Orthodox side to accept communion with Rome. Vestitorul did however offer praise to Gregorian's column on "the threat of Pan-Slavism", which the Greek Catholics identified with pan-Orthodoxism. Around that date, Sfarmă-Piatră was also involved in promoting the sayings of Petrache Lupu, an illiterate peasant who claimed to have spoken with God. While mainstream media suggested that Lupu was a mere lunatic, Crainic proclaimed him a saint of the Orthodox Church and a symbol of Romanian values. Also in Sfarmă-Piatră, the younger Dan Botta depicted the peasant-prophet as the embodiment of "abnegation", "belief in the worth of the human soul", and resistance to change.

In 1936–1937, Papadima and Vintilă Horia used Sfarmă-Piatră to denounce those writers who, in their view, had authored pornographic texts. Papadima thus contributed an article attacking the prose of Mircea Eliade, a young modernist author who would later rally with the far right. He focused on Eliade's Domnișoara Christina, which contained a dream-like sequence in which an adult seems to have a sexual encounter with a 10-year-old girl, describing the writing as evidence of "pathology" and concluding that it was "inverted tripe." Another one of Papadima's articles depicted Eliade as "deliciously ridiculous at times", and accused of him discarding the position of "an honest worker" in order to claim leadership of "a phenomenon". Zigu Ornea claims that Papadima's criticism contributed to the Eliade's sacking from the University of Bucharest, in early 1937.

Like Gândirea and other publications from the same ideological field, Sfarmă-Piatră issued strong criticism of Tudor Arghezi, whose work bridged the gap between modernism and traditionalism. The controversy centered on Arghezi's volume Flori de mucigai ("Mildew Flowers"): after publishing an article in which he declared himself dissatisfied with the newly found experimental focus in Arghezi's literature, Horia returned with a piece denouncing the older writer for his "willing adhesion to pornography" and "treason" of the traditionalist guidelines. He described Arghezi's modern style as "bloated and muddy". Horia asserted: "[when it comes to Arghezi,] no insult is too much, no curse word is at fault."

In April 1938, Papadima signed a congratulatory article addressed to the justice system. This came after a tribunal ordered avant-garde writer Geo Bogza to be imprisoned for publishing some frankly erotic poems. On the occasion, Papadima furnished a list of other writers who, he claimed, were guilty of that offense: Aderca, H. Bonciu, and Max Blecher. The text referred to the former two solely under their Jewish names (respectively, Froim Aderca and Haimovici Bonciu), which neither were using in their literary careers.

=== Early rivalries within the far right ===
One of the campaigns launched by Sfarmă-Piatră involved attacks on the National Christian Party, which it had originally supported. In an article of October 1936, Crainic claimed that, early in the 1930s, he had been offered leadership of A. C. Cuza's National-Christian Defense League from the hand of its aging leader. He then accused Goga of maneuvering to obtain unquestioned rule over the PNC, that had emerged as a fusion of Cuza's League and Goga's National Agrarian Party. Ornea describes this attitude as being Crainic's attempt to reemerge from relative isolation, create himself a "political footing", and founding the Romanian "ethnocratic state". It was through Sfarmă-Piatră that Crainic introduced the "ethnocratic" concept to the Romanian public, calling it "the first and only serious basis from which one may begin to discuss and accomplish the unification of [Romania's] nationalist movement".

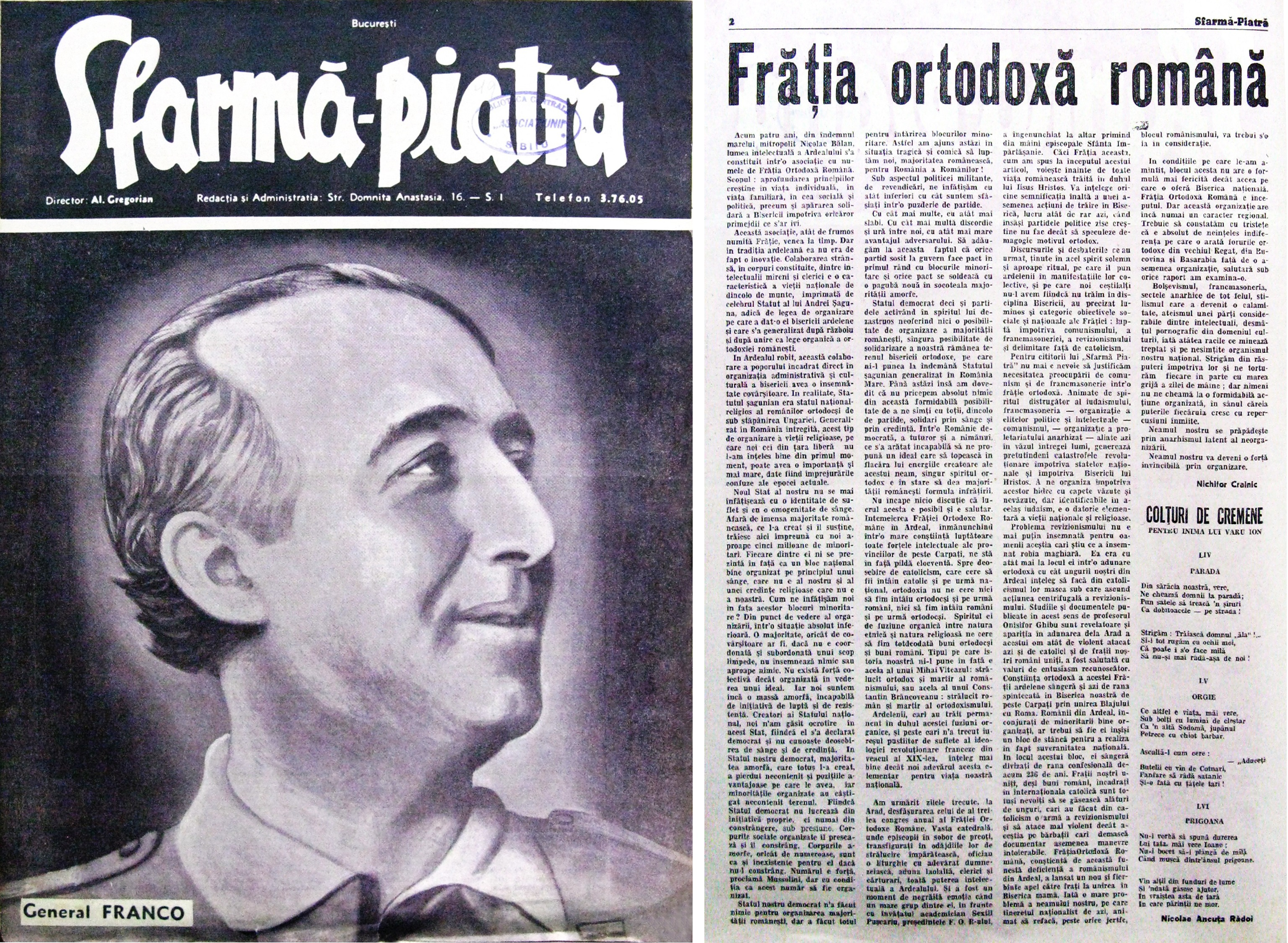
Sfarmă-Piatră 20 Oct. 1936 newspaper with article about Frăția Ortodoxă Română

Writing for the newspaper in 1937, Crainic complained that, while antisemitic, A. C. Cuza was still exclusively pro-democracy. He stated his own belief in the totalitarian method: "And then how can Cuzism be democratic, if it is antisemitic? The 'elimination' of kikes through democracy? But what reasonable political thinker could conceive of such an aberration, other than Mr. A. C. Cuza?" The same year, after that program had been rebutted by corporatist ideologue Mihail Manoilescu in the magazine Buna Vestire, effectively an Iron Guard platform, Crainic returned with a Sfarmă-Piatră editorial expressing deep disappointment. He still took care to note that the ethnocratic project model was not a "chromatic imitation" of Nazi German or Italian fascist totalitarianism, but his newspaper regularly featured homages to Adolf Hitler and Benito Mussolini. In one article of this series, Crainic himself referred to Mussolini as "one of the greatest educators of mankind".

Although Nichifor Crainic attempted to unify the far right movement around himself, and create a "Christian Workers' Party", these renewed efforts were largely futile. Early on, he addressed his appeals to the Iron Guard, and in particular its youngest members. Ornea notes that this was effort hampered in mid 1936: with his theological credentials, Crainic condemned the ritualized assassination of Mihai Stelescu (a dissident Guardist and leader of the Crusade of Romanianism, who had incurred Codreanu's wrath). Nevertheless, it was also in 1936 that Sfarmă-Piatră published Botta's texts about self-sacrifice. These, historian of religion Andrei Oișteanu notes, complimented the Guard's own doctrine on justified murder-suicides and the necessity for political violence. Alluding to the folk legend about Meșterul Manole, who gave his wife's life in return for completion of the Argeș Monastery, Botta wrote: "Death implies a sacrifice. The deceased ktitors on whose bones a country was founded are the heroic dead. [...] How beautiful does this meaning of death-foundation in the Argeș Monastery ballad! How all-encompassing its teaching! [...] Let us learn to die!"

More enthusiastic about Mussolini than he was about Hitler, and dreaming of a fascist communion of all Romance peoples, Crainic was also disappointed that Codreanu was openly supporting Nazism. Believing that the Nazi attitudes were best suited to the "Nordic" psychology, Crainic stated: "the Romanian would err profoundly if he were to deny the virtues of our Latinism." With the start of the Spanish Civil War, the paper was staunchly supportive of the Nationalists, and published in translation the memoirs of Alfonso Ruiz de Grijalba.

At the time, Protopopescu left Crainic's enterprise and became manager of Manoilescu's Buna Vestire. Toma Vlădescu also left for Buna Vestire, where he regularly attacked his former mentor and employer. One of his lampoons proclaimed Crainic "a cadaver" filled with "stench", and suggested "drowning [him] in a little bit of salubrious ink." By then, Sfarmă-Piatră's allies at Vremea also took distance from Crainic and rallied with Codreanu, accusing the former of "amok" and "megalomania". Crainic also fell out with Curentul. In 1937, Gregorian's articles in Sfarmă-Piatră openly accused Curentul editor Pamfil Șeicaru of being a habitual blackmailer, land speculator and gang leader.

Just before the 1937 election, when the Iron Guard, the PNC and other far right parties competed against each other, Crainic again deplored factionalism, calling for a unified bloc against the political left. The election had a uniquely indecisive result, and King Carol II nominated Goga's party (the fourth-running) to form the new cabinet. Crainic switched his backing to the PNC, applauding from the side its introduction of racial discrimination policies. Sfarmă-Piatră oscillated for two more months, during which the PNC and its Lăncieri paramilitary units fought Codreanu's movement over control of the cities. In January 1938, Crainic's column celebrated the Iron Guard, referring to its Legionaries as the real victors in the 1937 election (where they had placed third), praising them for their youth and supposedly universal social appeal, and claiming that they best represented his ideal of nationalist unity. His piece called the Guard's rise "a phenomenon that nothing shall be able to curb from now on."

Less than a month later, King Carol decided to end his partnership with the PNC and to depose Premier Goga. In what Ornea characterizes as an "opportunistic" move, Sfarmă-Piatră claimed that the Goga cabinet had shown itself to be "noisy, superficial and utterly unprepared". Crainic's argument still revolved around ethnocracy, and he was in effect condemning Goga's unwillingness to adopt the ethnocratic program as his own. Soon after, Carol instituted his own brand of authoritarianism with Miron Cristea as Premier, the first move toward the establishment of an anti-Iron Guard monopoly-party, named National Renaissance Front. Crainic expressed a hope that ethnocracy was to be enacted under this new regime. According to Ornea, such a belief, again publicized through Sfarmă-Piatră, showed that Crainic still "understood nothing from the course of political life."

=== 1938 decline and support for King Carol ===
In February–June 1938, Crainic was absent from among Sfarmă-Piatră's staff, dedicating himself entirely to his work on Porunca Vremii. In his absence, Sfarmă-Piatră became a tribune for some younger and more radical essayists who, as a common trait, identified themselves with the ancient Dacians more than with the Latins (see Origin of the Romanians, Dacianism). The signs of this change were already present in Horia's account of his trek through the mountains, and in Botta's political essays. Their justification of indifferent death cited the sacrificial Dacian cult of Zalmoxis. In parallel contributions to Gândirea, Botta outlined his theory about the survival of Dacian and "Thracian" identities within the modern-day Romanian man. His views were highly controversial, being rated by other commentators as "Thracomania" and "obsession". Other than Botta, the Dacianist category at Sfarmă-Piatră included Simion Dimancea, who, in a 1938 issue of Sfarmă-Piatră, commented on Romania's cultural future: "Will the Latin style predominate, or will the Dacian one? Both. However, the Dacian one will shine more majestically: it is at home." At the time, the Sfarmă-Piatră board included poet and essayist Ștefan Baciu, who contributed literary notices.

Upon Crainic's return, the magazine was struggling with both financial difficulties and the censorship enforced by Carol's bureaucracy. Between that date and October 1938, it published a series of special issues dedicated to various proudly reactionary figures on the public stage (writer Ioan Alexandru Brătescu-Voinești, physician and antisemitic agitator Nicolae Paulescu), as well as to specific episodes in the history of Romania (between the age of Wallachian Prince Constantin Brâncoveanu and the 1916 Battle of Romania). Ornea describes this series as "rather insipid", noting that they signaled commercial failure: Sfarmă-Piatră turned into a monthly magazine, and was published as such until October 1938. Among the other main features of that period were two feuilletons: one was a Romanian-language translation of Hitler's Mein Kampf, the other was Brătescu-Voinești's essay on "Germanophobia". Also featured in this series were Cronici germane ("German Chronicles"), by Baciu. As the author himself explained, these were supposed to familiarize the public with various aspects of German culture, focusing especially on "that superb German Romanticism".

Meanwhile, a government backlash decimated the Iron Guard. The authorities killed Codreanu in custody, after which the Guard's surviving lower echelon turned to a relentless campaign of violence. In January 1939, Crainic and Sfarmă-Piatră again threw their support behind the authorities: condemning all political assassinations ordered by Codreanu's successor Horia Sima, Crainic claimed to have always abhorred destructive methods. He also implied that, in all his previous texts, he had been deploring the Guard's methods, and that the "new generation" of fascists had proved a disappointment. Ornea claims that Crainic's was merely a last-minute attempt to dissuade censorship from investigating his Legionary connections. Although Crainic offered praise to the National Renaissance Front, its authoritarian Constitution, and Carol's fascist-themed corporatism, Sfarmă-Piatră was abruptly shut down on March 5, 1939. Baciu published more of his Cronici germane in the literary supplement of Universul. He was also recovered by Gândirea, before revelations that he was secretly a member of the anti-fascist Social Democratic Party.

Sfarmă-Piatră reemerged, again as a newspaper, on December 22 of the same year, when it continued to support Carol and his dictatorship. A long series of eulogies for the monarch followed, some of them the work of poet Radu Gyr, a former Iron Guard activist who had just been let out of a concentration camp in Miercurea Ciuc. One of Gyr's articles for the paper condemned all Legionaries as "hooligans", and proposed a new moral guideline for the Romanian far right: "The king summons incandescent nationalism [...] The king summons the youth. These are the sacred hooligan ideas of yesterday, presently transformed into a light-bearing standard."

=== World War II politics ===
In late 1940, Carol's regime succumbed to the loss of Bessarabia, Northern Bukovina and Northern Transylvania (see Soviet occupation of Bessarabia and Northern Bukovina, Second Vienna Award). The Iron Guard reemerged, sharing power with Conducător Ion Antonescu: a professional soldier, Antonescu agreed to preside over a dualistic "National Legionary State". Sfarmă-Piatră again switched its allegiance, proclaiming that Antonescu had taken on "the armor of predestination" and a seat among great European leaders, with Hitler, Mussolini, Portuguese Estado Novo founder António de Oliveira Salazar and Francisco Franco, the Caudillo of Nationalist Spain. Soon after, it saluted the Iron Guard as "the first organically created form in the modern Romanian state." Now led by Gregorian, the publication was a weekly, then a daily. It carried the subtitle Săptamânal de luptă și doctrină românească ("Weekly of Romanian combat and doctrine"), later changed to Ziar de informație și luptă românească ("Newspaper of Romanian information and combat").

The magazine was still in print after the January 1941 Legionary Rebellion, whereby the Antonescu-Sima partnership had self-detonated. While Sima and his team took flight, Antonescu remained the uncontested Conducător. At that stage, Sfarmă-Piatră was mainly used for disseminating Antonescu's official policies, in general repressive and in particular antisemitic (see Romania during World War II, Holocaust in Romania). It soon began giving credence to the "Judeo-Bolshevism" conspiracy theory, and was especially vocal on this topic once Romania joined in the German-led attack on the Soviet Union. The military operation and the recovery of Bessarabia were received with enthusiasm by staff member Vintilă Horia, who wrote: "I am reminded of those horrific days when, last year, Asia spilled over the Dniester and the Jewish scum [...] were slapping the clean cheeks of the Romanian soldier."

Horia and the other Sfarmă-Piatră men also offered their support to the new wave of antisemitic repression, enacted on Antonescu's orders. Their role as instigators was recorded during the June 1941 pogrom, carried out in the eastern city of Iași: Leizer Finchelstein, the Jewish employee of a newsstand and pogrom survivor, recalled that the Romanian authorities had explicitly asked him to distribute and display Sfarmă-Piatră, alongside Porunca Vremii, in the months before violence erupted. On the eve of the massacre, Crainic's paper publicized the official version of the events, under the misleading headline: "500 Judeo-communists Who Shot at Romanian and German Troops, Executed in Iași". The action was further commended in Declinul iudaismului ("The Decline of Judaism"), an editorial piece by Vintilă Horia. It argued that Romania was fighting off a "universal Jewish dictatorship", and thus supporting the emancipation of Russian Christians.

In July of that year, Sfarmă-Piatră hosted an article by a V. Beneș. It described in detail the "Antijudaic and antimasonic policy" of Mihai Antonescu, the Romanian second-in-command, quoting from an interview of his with the Italian fascist press. These policies were supported from the side by the various members of the Sfarmă-Piatră cell. Horia celebrated the war as a victory of fascist Europe over "barbarous Asia", noting that it crowned the fight against all "democrats, Jews and Masons", and suggesting the Romania was at her best when on the offensive. His later pieces called Hitler a "Great European", more constructive a figure than Napoleon, and a driving force of Europe's progress—claims included by researcher Laszlo Alexandru among "the most egregious" homages to the German dictator. At the time when war erupted, Alexandru Gregorian was in Rome, attached to the Romanian diplomatic corps. According to Manolescu, he may have been the author of a much debated article in Vremea, where, in "Legionary language", he welcomes the anti-Soviet war as a modern-day "Crusade". Gregorian was eventually drafted, and participated in the Siege of Sevastopol.

By that stage, the Sfarmă-Piatră Dacianists had established a new cell around Dacia, a semi-official magazine co-edited by Botta. Their activity there was touched by scandal, once Botta questioned the alternative Dacianism of philosopher Lucian Blaga. Blaga offered his irate and politically-tinged reply in Timpul newspaper; a duel between the two writers was narrowly avoided.

== Posterity ==
=== Aftermath ===
The newspaper was eventually disestablished later in the war: following the change of fortunes and the start of Soviet presence in Romania, Crainic was cited in court. Sentenced in absentia for his role in instigating racial hatred (1945), he turned himself in after some two years in hiding. The original verdict was revised, but Crainic confronted the newly established communist regime, and was still held at Aiud Prison for a period of 15 years. He was afterward rehabilitated in part, and assigned to the staff of Glasul Patriei, a communist propaganda mouthpiece targeting the Romanian diaspora and controlled by the Securitate police apparatus. A similar road was taken by Radu Gyr, first incarcerated from 1945 to 1958, and then again sentenced for morally supporting the anti-communist maquis. As a show of goodwill from the communists, Gyr spent some time working under Crainic at Glasul Patriei. George Ivașcu, the underground communist and Vremea columnist, spent five years in communist prisons, having been mistakenly identified as a Sfarmă-Piatră writer by the Securitate.

Protopopescu distanced himself from the Guard as early as April 1938, and lived in fear of retribution. He committed suicide by throwing himself under an elevator, before Securitate operatives managed to apprehend him. In contrast, Pan M. Vizirescu escaped a prison sentence by hiding in an attic for a period of 23 years. Never completely rehabilitated under communist law, he remained a vocal supporter of Codreanu's ideas well into old age. Papadima, kept in prison from 1952 to 1955, only regained his right of signature in 1971, becoming a widely respected folklorist and cultural historian. Although noted by his contemporaries as an outspoken follower of the Guard, Dan Botta was merely ignored by the communists or prevented from publishing until his death in 1958. According to one account, at least one Sfarmă-Piatră journalist was recovered by Zaharia Stancu, head of the state-sponsored Writers' Union. Stancu, who had debuted with Crainic's press before switching to leftist politics, was a self-declared "enemy" of Sfarmă-Piatră's fascist stance, but refused to "chase away like dogs" any colleague in despair.

Other members of the Sfarmă-Piatră group, whom the war's end caught on the other side of the Iron Curtain, escaped the political backlash altogether. Gregorian avoided repatriation, and, in contrast with Crainic, was eventually employed by the American-financed Radio Free Europe. The self-exiled Horia pursued a successful literary career in Western Europe until 1960, when revelations of his fascist past, including his Sfarmă-Piatră articles, prevented him from receiving The Goncourt. Recovered as editor of the newspaper Libertatea, Ștefan Baciu became affiliated to the Social Democratic anti-communist faction, and, appointed to a diplomatic posting in Bern, defected to the West. He worked as a writer and academic in Latin America, Seattle, and ultimately Honolulu. He was kept under surveillance by the Securitate, which repeatedly claimed that he was secretly an Iron Guard affiliate.

=== Posthumous controversies ===
A decade after the Romanian Revolution of 1989, the cultural legacy of Romanian totalitarianism was undergoing critical reevaluation. As various critics note, the fact that Sfarmă-Piatră brought together some of the period's leading writers helps document the spread of fascism and antisemitism within the Romanian middle class in the 1930s and '40s. However, in post-communist times, some publishers have created controversy by choosing to omit mentions of Sfarmă-Piatră from the standard bibliographies of such figures, obscuring their association with the Iron Guard or with Antonescu. Referring to the standard dictionaries of Romanian literature, published or revised before 2005, literary historian Paul Cernat proposed that the selective censorship of totalitarian beliefs, either fascist or communist, rendered the works unreliable. An especially contentious case is that of Vintilă Horia. His inclusion among the fascist writers was repeatedly contested by those who regard him as mainly an anti-communist—according to Laszlo, these views rely on a severe distortion of historical facts. Writer and editor Geo Șerban also notes a habit of only mentioning Horia's contributions to the more palatable Gândirea, and so a tendency "to hide away [his] involvement in the more foul, hooligan-like, campaigns of Sfarmă-Piatră or Porunca Vremii".

Around 2000, the creation of minor Iron Guard-inspired groups brought the creation of an online newspaper, also called Sfarmă-Piatră. As noted by political scientist Gabriel Andreescu, this is one of several strictly online projects of pro-Legionary activists trying to gain exposure in the mainstream media—in this case, the publisher is a "George Manu Foundation". Similarly, educationist Ștefan Popenici suggested that, against anti-defamation legislation, the deregulated web could still foster "hatefilled" sites, from sfarma-piatra.com and Noua Dreaptă's homepage to a Romanian electronic version of NSDAP/AO (1972). Media analyst William Totok additionally noted that the new Sfarmă-Piatră, a "pro-Sima" venture, was partly dedicated to combating other factions that claim to represent the Guard's legacy. The publication sat on the far right of the Bessarabian reunification movement, and publicized an appeal (seen as "revisionistic" by Andreescu) for Romania not to recognize an independent Moldova.

According to Michael Shafir, its circulation as of 2003 was "probably minuscule". It was still existing in 2009, and, through a Syndikat Z network, maintained connections with other far right circles in Europe (German People's Union, Workers' Party of Social Justice) and North America.
