= H. Bonciu =

Romanian writer (1893 - 1950)

H. (Horia) Bonciu Bercu Haimovici, Beniamin Haimovici, Hieronim Haimovici
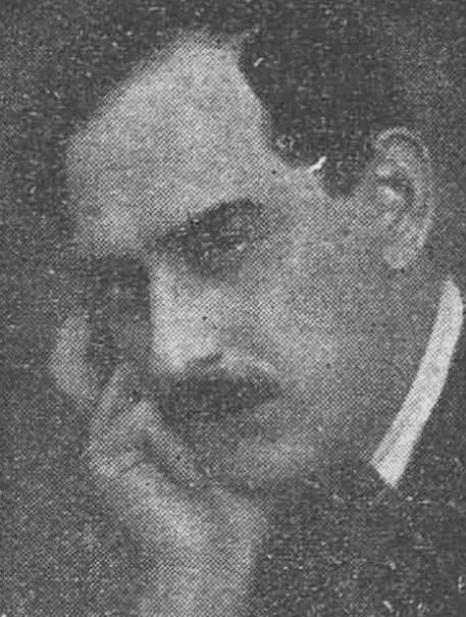
- Photograph of Bonciu, dated before 1935
- Born: May 19, 1893; Iași
- Died: April 27, 1950 (aged 56); Bucharest
- Occupations: poet, novelist, translator, columnist, businessman, winemaker
- Writing career
- Pen name: Bon-Tsu-Haș, Sigismund Absurdul
- Period: ca. 1912–1945
- Genres: Bildungsroman, erotic literature, fantasy literature, lampoon, lyric poetry, prose poetry, sonnet
- Movements: Avant-garde; Decadence; Expressionism; Naturalism; Neoromanticism; Surrealism; Symbolism; Trăirism

H. Bonciu, or Horia Bonciu (Romanian pronunciation: [ˈhori.a ˈbont͡ʃju]; reportedly born Bercu, Beniamin or Hieronim Haimovici, also known as Bonciu Haimovici, Haimovici Bonciu; May 19, 1893 – April 27, 1950), was a Romanian novelist, poet, journalist and translator, noted especially as an atypical figure on his country's avant-garde scene. His work, comprising several volumes of poetry and two novels, is a mixture of influences from the diverse literary schools of Europe's modernism, and, unusually in the context of Romanian literature, borrows heavily from German-born movements such as Expressionism. The autofictional and cruel detail in Bonciu's narratives makes him a senior figure among Romania's own Trăirist authors, while its capture of the unnaturally grotesque also finds him as one of the country's Neoromantics and Surrealists.

Opposed by the literary establishment when his erotic subjects became more widely known, and further marginalized for his Jewish origin, H. Bonciu was even prosecuted in the 1930s on grounds of "pornography". His work was banned by the local fascist movements, and later selectively censored by the communist regime. The controversy, like his refusal to rally with any particular cultural movement of the interwar, has touched the critical reception of his work, and has introduced a decades-long debate about its contextual value. While some scholars find Bonciu a necessary addition to the modern literary canon and a forerunner of postmodern literature, others describe him as mediocre or pretentious.

== Biography ==
=== Bohemian life ===
Bonciu was born in Iași to the Jewish couple Carol Haimovici and Ghizela Nadler. Little is known about his childhood other than the family's move to Bucharest, which happened when he was still a toddler; it was in Bucharest that he completed his primary and secondary education. Bonciu may have been enrolled at the Frederick William University of Berlin. Beyond this uncertain affiliation, it is known that Bonciu must have spent part of his youth in the German Empire and Austria-Hungary, and that such a cultural encounter shaped his entire approach to literature. In a 1997 article, literary historian Ovid Crohmălniceanu assessed: "among the Romanian writers, only H. Bonciu has had the occasion to encounter proper Jugendstil" (see Symbolist movement in Romania).

As a young adult, Bonciu obtained his main income from trading in umbrellas and curtains. He made his literary debut in 1912, when he published in Bucharest's theatrical magazines Rampa and Cortina. There was a pause in activity during most of World War I, when Romania fought against Germany and the other Central Powers—he was possibly in enemy territory, but, judging by references in his novels, he may also have seen action in the Romanian Land Forces. One other story places Bonciu in Vienna during much of 1917. According to this account, the expatriate Romanian salesman met and closely befriended the Hungarian poet-activist Endre Ady.

Bonciu was probably back in Bucharest in early 1918, as Romania was negotiating a peace with Germany (see Romania during World War I). His poems and translations from Peter Altenberg were taken up by the theatrical daily Scena, put out in German-occupied Bucharest by dramatist A. de Herz. It has been suggested that Bonciu's avant-garde sympathies and stylistic rebellion has its roots in the period, making him part of the same wave as Tristan Tzara (Romanian inventor of Dadaism), but that he lost momentum by only making public his avant-garde work after 1930.

In 1920, Bonciu resumed his contribution to Rampa, where he published his translation of poems by Anton Wildgans. That year, he also returned to Vienna, but was still included as a member of Rampa's editorial staff; in 1921, he inaugurated a long period of activity with another Romanian-based literary newspaper, Adevărul Literar și Artistic. Having established his reputation as a journalist, Bonciu became a regular columnist: his letters, headlined Mișcarea artistică de la noi și din străinatate ("The Art Movement in Our Country and Abroad"), ran in several national newspapers. Among the major periodicals who hosted his work over the next decade are Viața Românească, Facla, Azi, Meridian, and Isac Ludo's ADAM review. He also began using a number of pen names, including, in addition to H. Bonciu, Sigismund Absurdul ("Sigismund the Absurd")—effectively, his literary alter ego. The other pseudonym he used was Bon-Tsu-Haș.

In 1924, Bonciu married a Gabriela Kimmel, living, until 1934, in relative isolation from the literary scene. Early in the 1930s, the family had moved back to Iași, where Bonciu set up a new business in the production and distribution of Moldavian wine. On his vineyard, covering some 15 hectares outside of Miroslava, the writer created sweet "Uricani wine", seen by some oenologists as one of Romania's finest, and a very popular drink throughout the country. The passion for wine-making later resulted in a friendship between Bonciu and celebrated actor-satirist Constantin Tănase; the latter acclimatized Uricani trunks at his own villa, in Balotești. Bonciu was a regular gambler and drinker, who supplied the bohemian society of Iași with affordable wine. Humorist Păstorel Teodoreanu, who attended this society, recalls: "Old folks in Iași may still remember Bonciu's devout wine, that every Iași inhabitant back in the day would gorge on at their own will, in Tuflii Café, for 2,50 lei a bottle. [...] Just about every afternoon, the cart would stop on the dot at Unirii Square, facing Traian Café, where [Bonciu] would habitually play a game of chess. Waiting for his master, the gray-haired cart driver would fall asleep on his seat".

=== Main writing period ===
According to his journalist colleague Emil Cerbu, Bonciu's return to Rampa was both a literary revelation and the birth of a new poetic style: "He had sent in a poem a few days before. A sonnet made remarkable by the brutal force of its imagery. They told him it could not be published, because of one crude word that harmed the entire sonnet. The poet thereafter turned into another person, with another kind of poems. All of these had an internal structure never before seen in Romanian lyrical literature." It was during the Rampa years that observers began referring to Bonciu's synthesis as a local manifestation of Expressionism, the German current having already found a dedicated promoter in Cerbu. From this context were born H. Bonciu's poetry collections Lada cu năluci ("A Crate of Apparitions", 1932) and Eu și Orientul. Douăzeci și cinci de sonete ("I and the Orient. Twenty-five Sonnets", 1933). Both were published with Editura Vremea company. Lada cu năluci was printed in only 1,000 copies, each featuring Bonciu's autograph and a portrait of his by Tyrolese artist Alfons Walde.

With time, Bonciu became especially noted as the translator of works by Expressionists, Symbolists and Neoromantics from the area of German culture. Among others, they include Ady, Richard Beer-Hofmann, Klabund, Erich Mühsam, Alfons Petzold, Rainer Maria Rilke, Richard von Schaukal and Carl Spitteler. Of these, his rendition of Rilke's "What Will You Do, God, When I Die?" has been singled out for its beauty by critic Simona Vasilache. Additionally, Bonciu published versions of poems by France's pre-Symbolist Charles Baudelaire.

His full translation of Wildgans' Die Sonette an Ead, with the title Poeme către Ead, came in 1933, also with Editura Vremea. The work won praise from essayist and literary chronicler Ovidiu Papadima, who wrote for the magazine Gândirea that Bonciu was a "precious" and thoughtful translator, whose versions were more polished than Wildgans' originals.

Bagaj... ("Luggage"), also known as Strania, dubla existență a unui om în patru labe ("The Strange Double Life of a Man on His All Fours") or Confesiunile unui om în patru labe ("The Confessions of a Man on His All Fours"), was first published in 1934, marking Bonciu's beginnings as an eccentric novelist. Published by Editura Librăriei Leon Alcaly, its original jacket carries an enthusiastic introductory note, by the modernist doyen, poet and journalist Tudor Arghezi. The originals were liberally illustrated with reproductions of paintings and drawings by the late Vienna Secession artist Egon Schiele.

Allegedly, the novel was a commercial flop, only published in 500 copies. Outside the modernist circles, Romanian critics were generally uninterested in Bagaj..., or unaware that it even existed. Nevertheless, Bonciu continued to write and, in 1936, Alcaly issued his second novel: Pensiunea doamnei Pipersberg ("Mrs. Pipersberg's Boarding House").

=== Obscenity scandal and arrests ===
The following period brought Bonciu into the spotlight, as soon as the traditionalist and far right sections of the media began depicting him as one of the most obscene modern Romanian authors. This controversy was in effect sparked by culture critic Nicolae Iorga and his Neamul Românesc journal. The scandal intensified with time, and Bonciu saw himself included in lists of "pornographers", alongside some major or minor modernist writers: Arghezi, Geo Bogza, Mihail Celarianu, Mircea Eliade etc. One such directory, in Neamul Românesc, had Bonciu as the No. 1 obscene writer, with Bogza in second place and N. D. Cocea in at third. In Bonciu's case, the accusations mingled anti-modernism and antisemitism, only focusing on Bagaj... and simply ignoring the equally provocative content of Pensiunea.

The accusations found some backing among government officials. Reportedly, Bonciu was first arrested for a short while in 1932, together with Bogza. They were held in Văcărești Prison, outside of Bucharest, and joined there by the avant-garde youth of Alge magazine, all of them disciples of Bogza. Two years later, the case was being revisited by his peers inside the Romanian Writers' Society, where Bonciu's defense was taken by novelist Zaharia Stancu and critic Șerban Cioculescu. Around that date, Constantin Angelescu, Romania's Minister of Public Instruction, imposed state censorship on Pensiunea.

In 1937, the state opened a case against Bonciu and Bogza, who were again taken into custody. As noted by the Surrealist writer Sașa Pană, this came shortly after the Romanian Academy, through the voice of conservative author Ioan Alexandru Brătescu-Voinești, had openly demanded jail terms for both Bonciu and Bogza. A while after, Bogza latter protested vehemently, calling the anti-modernist campaign an "offensive toward darkness and intolerance", while noting that the modest circulations of his and Bonciu's avant-garde work could not justify the scale of repression. Bonciu found an unexpected backer in Eugen Lovinescu, a respected intellectual leader on the moderate side of modernism. Lovinescu admired Bagaj... for its style, if not for its content, and strongly believed that artists in general were above didactic requirements. Another such voice was that of novelist Liviu Rebreanu, who demanded from the Writers' Society a show of solidarity in condemning the arrests. His demand received backing from Stancu and Cioculescu.

The arrest was a cause for celebration in the other camp. At the Writers' Society, Rebreanu's motion was defeated after a clash of opinions, which almost resulted in the resignation of Society President Nicolae M. Condiescu. The guild's anti-Bonciu lobby included poet George Gregorian (who declared both detainees to be "pseudo-writers") and the formerly accused Eliade (who included himself among the opponents of "pornographic literature"). Writing for the fascist gazette Sfarmă-Piatră, the formerly sympathetic reviewer Papadima signaled that "Haimovici Bonciu" and Aderca were "big pigs" supported by "the Jewish media", on whom the state needed to focus its efforts. In a 1938 column for Gândirea, Papadima also contended that Bonciu and the anticlerical Romanian novelist Damian Stănoiu were in reality demanding "marketing freedom". In Papadima's account, they abused the notion of artistic liberty, as embodied by the "high art" of Baudelaire.

Bonciu was released soon after, and, in an interview with Azi newspaper, described the censorship effort as futile. He also gave a formal reply to the more critical of Lovinescu's pronouncements, writing a lampoon called Criticul de porțelan ("The Porcelain Critic"). This enraged Lovinescu, who then published a sarcastic note regarding Bonciu's public persona, the piece later known as Poetul absolut, "The Absolute Poet". It describes Bonciu's "oriental looks", athletic frame and sporting passion ("he does not shy away from walking down Bucharest's streets dressed up in a ski suit"). According to Lovinescu, that persona clashes badly with Bonciu's demand for sensitivity: "[he] is the eternal convalescent of an unforgiving disease: literaturitis. Whatever subject one may wish to explore, [...] in less than five minutes the conversation, like in some kind of dance, retreats back to art, naturally his own art, to what he has written, writes, will write, to the torture that is his writing process, to his elevated concepts on beauty, to the eternity of art versus the lies of the present, and so on."

=== World War II and later life ===
In parallel with his growth as a novelist, Bonciu became known to the literati as a prankster and eccentric social observer. In 1937, at the funeral of novelist Anton Holban, Bonciu grabbed the public eye by seating himself in the coffin, his protest against "the inequities of the clergy". Two years later, before the start of World War II, he self-published his third poetry collection, called Brom ("Bromine").

Antisemitism and fascism became official policies in Romania in the late 1930s (see Holocaust in Romania), and Bonciu found himself excluded from literary life for most of the war years. Under the regime of Conducător Ion Antonescu, his entire work was officially banned throughout the country, alongside that of many other Jewish writers. The censorship trend found as its main opponent the literary historian and polemicist George Călinescu, who made a point of assessing past Jewish contributions (Bonciu and Aderca's included), and presented it to the public in a 1941 treatise on Romanian literature. During the subsequent press campaign targeting Călinescu, Gândirea accused him of having betrayed Romanian suffering under "the pointy claw of the Talmud". According to such notes, Bonciu's novels illustrated the "poisonous" influence of Jewish literature.

H. Bonciu's last work of poetry saw print in 1945, soon after war had ended, with Contemporană publishing house. It carries the title Requiem. He died in April 1950, some two years after a communist regime had been imposed on Romania. He was in Bucharest, bedridden, suffering with terminal cancer and receiving farewell visits from others in his generation. One of the last to attend was fellow author Aderca, who recorded Bonciu's bitter joke: "Do you know which is the most bearable of all ways of dying? [...] someone else's."

== Work ==
=== Eclecticism and classification attempts ===
For reasons unknown, H. Bonciu refused to openly affiliate with any of the many interwar literary factions which thrived in Greater Romania. In his 1937 companion to 20th century literature, Eugen Lovinescu described him as a paradoxical, outdated and eccentric author: "the eagerness for novelty, for situations and expressions dominates [in his novels]; but since the novelty dates back to the age of Expressionism, it is currently more outdated than the most up-to-date literature." Writing in 2005, Simona Vasilache presented Bonciu as "a lonely dreamer, terrified by the world like a baby is of bad dreams". Researcher Paul Cernat also presented Bonciu as isolated from the Romanian avant-garde, and as such "perhaps a franc-tireur".

According to critic Gabriela Glăvan, Bonciu's literature is "hybrid" and "borderline" in that it combines "an Expressionism with avant-garde touches" with "slides into the oneiric and Surrealism. [...] His fragmentary poetic devices, alongside the uncertainty of his belonging to any literary genre, are sufficient elements for Bonciu's classification as an unusual author." The same is noted by critic Florina Pîrjol, who reads in Bonciu "a strange mix of the Expressionistic grotesque and the Surrealistic tenderness." In his wartime biographical essay, George Călinescu further argues that Bonciu's overall contribution mixes together "Neoromantic, Naturalistic and Expressionistic elements. The tendency of personifying the great laws of existence, such as death, the unexpected move [...] into the realm of hallucination, the sarcastic and extravagant witz are all Romantic. The Expressionistic parts are the elevation of each moment into an idea, the obfuscation of things into symbolic smoke, the metaphysical interpretation of everyday tragedy. Beyond these, the habit of seeing dramas and issues in all moments of life comes from the German-Jewish writers of the Werfel type."

Ovid Crohmălniceanu also proposed that Bonciu is in fact an Expressionist by accident, whose actual literary models are the proto-Expressionism of Vienna Secession and (even older) currents born into Austrian culture. Bonciu, he argues, gained an Expressionist profile by performing his own, independent, mix of literary themes: transcendence is borrowed from Neoromanticism, instinctual drive from Naturalism, subjectivity from Impressionism, and "paneroticism" from Jugendstil and Symbolism. Other literary historians presume the same connections. Dan Grigorescu suggests that Bonciu's Expressionism was mostly "exterior", spread over Jugendstil, Impressionism, Surrealism and various eclectic mixtures; Marian Victor Buciu focuses on Bonciu as a meeting point between the "Naturalist typology" and Expressionism, noting that his Surrealism is less supplied. Nevertheless, Călinescu supposes an ideological link between Bonciu and the Romanian Surrealists at unu magazine, since a "man with hatstand head" sketch, by unu artists Jules Perahim, illustrated one of Bonciu's works. In Călinescu's interpretation, the "grotesque" drawing brings to life "a moment of dementia", and this is analogous to Bonciu's own intentions: "H. Bonciu, who despises realism and claims to be writing 'with the red of my arteries and the green of my cerebrospinal fluid', works in the same hieroglyphic mode."

Such nuances notwithstanding, H. Bonciu's contribution was readily annexed to the school of Romanian Expressionism. Dan Grigorescu traces the literary phenomenon to its source: "In what concerns H. Bonciu, critics have passed a more resolute judgment than on any other Romanian writer to have ever been considered a bearer of Expressionist ideas: he was without doubt the one who generated least debate." After it became a point of reference, the definition of Bonciu's work as "Expressionist" created some debate among 20th-century scholars. The issue was notably raised by researcher Ovidiu Cotruș, who found it improbable that Romanian Expressionism was as diverse as to reunite the mystical poetry of Lucian Blaga and the crude language of Bagaj.... He therefore demanded some kind of critical revision. However, according to cultural historian Ion Pop, Bonciu remains Romania's only "integral Expressionist", although, even in this context, Bonciu's work "did not record any significant [Expressionist] shakes".

=== Bonciu and Trăirism ===
With his search for "authenticity" in subject and expression, and despite his avant-garde credentials, Bonciu is sometimes included among the younger-generation Trăirists, alongside Max Blecher, Mircea Eliade, Anton Holban or Mihail Sebastian. Crohmălniceanu, who finds an ultimate source of literary Trăirism in narratives by André Gide, describes Bonciu's novels as "impressive literary documents" of the Trăirist movement. Described as the more experimental voice of this subgenre, and opposed to Holban's conventional approach, Bonciu was also repeatedly compared with a secondary figure in Trăirism, the novelist Constantin Fântâneru. According to reviewer Igor Mocanu, Bonciu, Blecher and Fântâneru share between them a transgression of avant-garde aesthetics and a taste for absurdism: "These three authors would create [...] a new way of making literature, which took a tiny bit from all the currents and movements of its time. We are dealing with books where, emerging out of an evidently surreal depictions, one comes across dialogues heavily impregnated with the absurd." The Bonciu–Blecher comparison is more controversial: various reviewers have noted that, while Bonciu visualizes the suffering of himself and others, Blecher records his real-life combat with Pott disease.

In Bonciu's novels and his poetry, the sexual function is a tool of apparent liberation, man's only possible flight from existential despair. Beyond the 1937 scandal, Bonciu's breach of sexual convention in his literary subjects was especially criticized by mainstream literati. According to Călinescu, Bonciu suffered from literary "priapism", as well as being a "verbose" and "sentimentalist" author. In Poetul absolut, Lovinescu accused Bonciu of "glaring tastelessness" and of promoting an "obsessive" eroticism. The erotic fragments, scandalous in their day, were seen with comparatively less displeasure by newer generations of exegetes. România Literară columnist Ion Simuț notes that they only cover a few pages of Bonciu's entire work, and that the imagery used is rarely "vulgar". Looking back on the 1930s, literary theorist Ion Bogdan Lefter notes that, within the self-censoring Romanian literature, Bonciu was one of the very few who ventured to lift the "prude barrier" and actually depict the sexual contact, while Cernat suggests that Bonciu's original denunciators barely hid their politicized agenda: "a xenophobic accusation of Jewified, anti-national, pornography".

Traditionally, Bonciu's writing style and mastery of the Romanian language have received both attention and praise. Lovinescu found these to be his validation as an artist. In Poetul absolut, he alternated critique with professional respect, concluding that Bonciu's talent deserved "a better fate." He was to elaborate on the topic in 1937, when he wrote: "The essential merit of [his] novels is a stylistic violence that is still restrained by the remarkable dignity of language and accuracy in the artistic finish. As for the substance, so to say: a sexual release, an obsession [...] haunts therein; the writer's art will not hide his desolation." For Călinescu, one of Bonciu's interests as a storyteller is his ability to merge a fantasy narrative and "piercing" realistic episodes; others are his "fine bitterness" and "personal note of humor", even when alternating with "sad clownings". Similar comments were made decades later by Nicolae Manolescu, who rediscovered Bonciu as "a very talented writer", and by Buciu, who writes that Bonciu's "imposing rhetorical competence" outweighed his "amateurism".

This is contrasted by other verdicts. In 21st-century reviews, Bonciu was variously described as an author from the "second shelf" or "bottom bench" of Romanian literary culture. Ion Simuț writes that Bonciu, a "minor writer", generally displays "the tricks and clichés of aesthetic and moral nonconformity." Author Alina Irimescu recommends Bonciu for his depiction of life's "chaos", but concludes: "[he is at times] a middling writer, blinded by the tendencies of his time, who astounds and does not always have a more profound support." Florina Pîrjol defines Bonciu's forte as being his portraiture, but notes that his narratives lack "dynamism and coherence".

=== Poetry ===
Although he nominally took on the classical rhyme schemes such as the sonnet, Bonciu repeatedly disregarded them for convenience. Since the 1930s, various reviewers have consequently described him as semi-failed and lacking structure. George Călinescu's is a mixed review: "H. Bonciu brings into his poetry a pathos of diurnal life, pessimistic and sarcastic. His general tone is nonetheless shrill, because the author, although he masters the notion of poetry, lacks an artistic persona, being more of an intelligent amateur." Writing in 2005, Simuț found Bonciu "outdated" and "utterly modest" as a poet, linking his work in the field with the late-19th-century Decadent movement. Previously, Călinescu had described Bonciu as "all too indebted" to Austrian poetry.

Others have noted that Bonciu's main intent is in rendering the feeling of being crushed by evil nature, the violence of which requires the subversion of lyrical convention, and even of all rational dealings with his public. As argued by Crohmălniceanu: "Everything [here] becomes a chemical chart for the despair which his clowning is striving to keep hidden from view." The poems are, in Grigorescu's view, Bonciu's most Expressionistic creations.

Crohmălniceanu sees Bonciu's work in lyric poetry as illustrating the sense of hopelessness, coldly disguised under allusions to sadomasochism, or "the taste for maculation". He believes that the peak of such works is Brom, where anxiety builds up at the thought of demonic forces about to "sweep us up". Reviewers have made special note of "Living Words", the artistic credo found in Lada cu năluci:

Cuvinte vii ce-nșiruiți parada,
Păunilor de soare mult orbiți,
Intrați, păunii mei! Intrați în lada
În care veți muri înăbușiți,
În care poate vă va crește coada,
S-o resfirați în vremea care vine,
Când viermii orbi vor sfâșia din prada
Batjocurii ce va mai fi din mine.

Translation:

My living words, lined up for a parade,
Peacocks so very blinded by the sun,
Come in, my boys! Into the crate
Where you will die a suffocated death,
Where you might get to grow your tails,
Unfolded as they'll be in times to come,
When blinded worms will tear into their prey,
That sorry thing that shall be left of me.

Also remembered is a poem which introduces (and is introduced by) the word bleah, invented by Bonciu as an expression of absolute disgust. Literary columnist Radu Cosașu had admiringly described the novel term as "a word of havoc, invented by that dark wonder, the poet Bonciu, [...] a word of enigmatic transparency, untranslatable". Part of Bonciu's work reads:

Când luna umbra ți-o culcă, merge cum merge,
Până se aude în mobila neagră un crah,
Panică picură zeama momentului care se șterge
Fiindcă totul e bleah, absolut totul e bleah.

Translation:

When the moon settles down your shadow, it makes sense,
Until the black furniture goes with a crash,
Into drops of panic, the sauce of that moment spills out,
Because all things are bleah, really all things are bleah.

Bonciu's poems borrow their cultural symbols from very diverse sources. His taste for "an absurd and secretly terrifying mythology", in some Sigismund Absurdul pieces, is seen by Crohmălniceanu as a nod to the writings of Christian Morgenstern. "I and the Orient", the title of Bonciu's collected sonnets, is likely a reflection of Bonciu's debt to Hanns Heinz Ewers' India and I. Some poems of Bonciu's place artificial, medieval and knightly imagery over an existential moral—this, Vasilache notes, is one similarity between Bonciu and the modernist poet Emil Botta. In one other case, discussing his romance with a Jewish girl, Bonciu references the stereotypical image of his fellow Ashkenazim as "ruddy".

=== Bagaj... ===
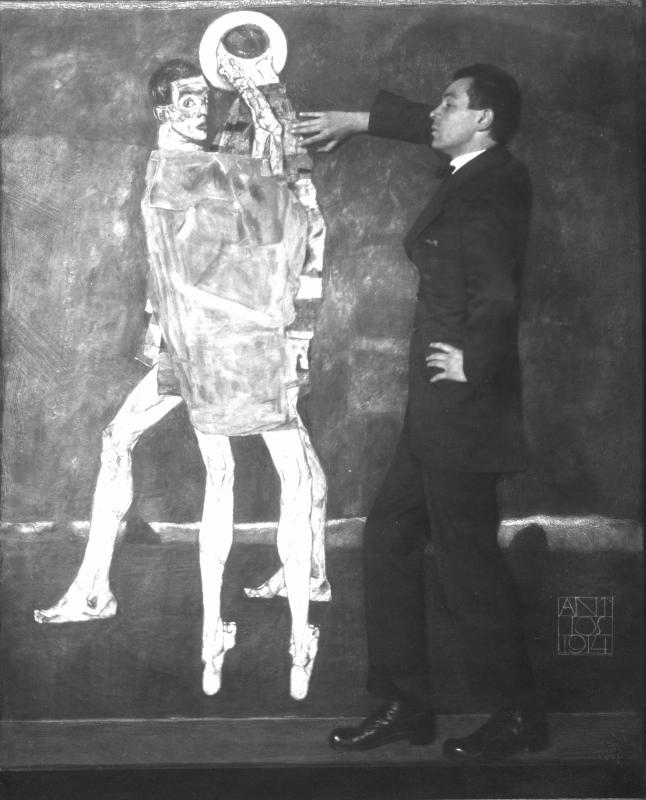
Egon Schiele posing with his fresco. 1914 photograph by Josef Anton Trčka

In his presentation of Bagaj..., Tudor Arghezi argued of H. Bonciu: "From a sty of crude colors, with plenty of gilded gossamer rubbed into it, his thick and greasy brush [...] paints into the fresco of our spiritual bedlam". Felix Aderca too campaigned for the novel and its "pages of genius". Another notable fan of the book was novelist and literary chronicler Mihail Sebastian, his Trăirist colleague, although he noted that Bonciu's text was not a fully formed novel. The same was concluded by Călinescu, who once described Bonciu the novelist as the author of "prose poems". Other critics tend to rate Bagaj... as a poorly finished work, insisting on its centrifugal narrative—one such conservative voice was that of Pompiliu Constantinescu, who still saluted Bonciu's decision to move into the genre of "Surreal prose", away from poetry. Some students of Bonciu's work disagree: according to Adriana Babeți, the "disconcerting amalgam" gives Bonciu his originality and strength.

Later revealed as Bonciu's alter ego, the narrator of Bagaj... focuses his attention on the more peculiar protagonist, Ramses Ferdinand Sinidis. The plot is, in fact, a story within a story: Bonciu reads through Sinidis' "black notebook", left unopened after its author was murdered. The killer is a Man with Copper Beak (Omul cu ciocul de aramă), whose confession to Bonciu is also rendered as a detailed story. The murder was carried out for an absurd reason, and the Man with Copper Beak is haunted by the memory. He does not regret Sinidis' death, but consumed by another, unwitting, murder: his improvised weapon has also pierced through a malevolent dwarf who lived in Sinidis' body, and whom Sinidis despised.

Beyond the pretext, the "black notebook" is an ample excursion into a sordid, self-destructive and peripheral environment, where real-life events merge with the purely fantastical. Vasilache sees in it a Wunderkammer comprising "violent initiations into the brutal life of the senses, interrupted then and now by brief mortuary rituals", while Alina Irimescu likens it to Edvard Munch's The Scream, noting "the realm of the undead is [Bonciu's] favorite topos." According to Glăvan, the plot is "a trajectory of the ego's unraveling", with "a certified propensity toward the voluptuousness of self-annulment", and an (anti-)Bildungsroman. Sinidis depicts his cruel adolescence and Oedipus conflict, his erotic experiences with two partners (the virginal heartthrob Laura, and the submissive mistress on the side), the trauma of a participation in World War I, and a cynical case of bankruptcy. As a brief interlude in his self-destructive discourse, Sinidis makes eulogistic comments about a promised world revolution, about "Bolshevik" ethics and a universal language, but has to defend his ideas against the dwarf that lives inside him. The creature then forces his host into an unloving marriage with Zitta, and Ramses' murder occurs just as he decides to end it; he and his murderer then make their way into an infernal brothel. In the closing episode of Bagaj..., Sinidis accepts his spiritual deconstruction, and looks to an eternity of degrading and bestial sexual acts with the "sweet-fleshed" prostitute Peppa.

Sindis' recurrent obsession is death, and he prophesies in detail about being an out-of-body witness to his funeral service and incineration, content that the flames would also consume his parasite. His tormented life is intertwined with those of desperate anti-heroes, including a gout-afflicted man who severs his own fingers, or a driller who was burned alive. When read as a camouflaged record of actual events in Bonciu's life, the novel reveals his claims about having been a witness to Vienna's artistic life under the Double Monarchy: Viennese writers such as Altenberg, Petzold, Wildgans, Peter Hille, Hugo von Hofmannsthal, Arthur Schnitzler, Stefan Zweig appear as characters, and Endre Ady is a literary prototype. In one section of the book, Ramses discovers the beautiful Hilda, who is a painter, a muse, and the living artwork of Egon Schiele, and who ends up being eaten alive by her creator; before this happens, Hilda, Schiele and Ramses become entangled in a sadomasochistic ménage à trois.

The autofictional element in Bagaj... was highlighted by Romania's other literati, beginning with Anton Holban's review in Adevărul. Holban gave praise to the work as a source of "delight", and first suggested that Bonciu belonged in the same category as Louis-Ferdinand Céline or Axel Munthe. The Céline comparison has endured as popular in Romanian literary theory: Glăvan finds that both Bonciu and Max Blecher, his more embittered generation colleague, are among the Romanian writers who found a model to follow in the Journey to the End of the Night; according to Pîrjol, Céline and Bonciu have a "family resemblance".

The main mix of influences, however, comes from the iconoclastic cultures of Secessionist Vienna and the Weimar Republic, with whom Bonciu was personally familiarized. Exegetes have identified in Bagaj... the echoes of writers translated by Bonciu (Altenberg, Petzold, Wildgans), but also from other such sources, including Hille. Furthermore, Crohmălniceanu sees the novel as incorporating elements from a literary branch of the "New Objectivity" movement: Klabund, but also Erich Kästner, as authors of "atrocious, sarcastic, grotesque and brutal realism". Glăvan too sees an analogy between Sinidis' grim reflection on war and landscapes by "New Objectivity" master Otto Dix. Others see the nightmarish protagonists as cultural echoes from the Bizarre Pages of Romanian absurdist author Urmuz.

=== Pensiunea doamnei Pipersberg ===
In Pensiunea doamnei Pipersberg, Bonciu preserves his narrator persona and revives Ramses Sinidis. The novel, variously read as a continuation or a prequel, opens with the meeting between Ramses and the storyteller; Sinidis has been afflicted by muteness, but, at the very time of this encounter, a bizarre accident forces his voice back. The two then proceed to reconstruct the missing portions of Sinidis' life, an intertextual exercise in which protagonist advises writer how to best perform his task. The background themes are despair and solitude: Ramses is on the search for someone to share his existential burden, and the narrative grows to include, according to Crohmălniceanu, an "entire gallery of tormented yet hilarious faces".

The plot is in large part focused on the eponymous "boarding house", in fact a brothel. There are three correspondents of the "black notebook", which obsess about the themes other than death: "Book of the Flesh", "Book of the Wine", "Book of the Soul". The sexual act is again depicted in key moments of the book, showing Sinidis' first sexual experience, with a laundress, or his later intercourse with "a cow-woman" (according to Simuț, these scenes are passionate but not in fact obscene). The needy Lenny Pipersberg and her daydreaming prostitutes reify the feeling of inadequacy—the girl Nora despises the natural green of her hair, and kills herself in desperation. According to Pîrjol, this is a book of "quasi-theatrical melancholy", alternating the "cruel" and the "implausible-bucolic", especially adept at describing "abjection". The novel, she notes, is antifeminist, showing women piled up in Sinidis' collection of escapades, "as if in an insect box."

== Legacy ==
According to researcher Alina Ianchiș, Bonciu's isolation and his lack of "self-affirmation" contributed to the ambiguous or dismissive assessments of his work by academic contemporaries. The writer only returned to critical attention in 1964, when Crohmălniceanu first lectured on him at the University of Bucharest. His versions of Baudelaire's poems were included in a luxury edition of Les Fleurs du mal, put together by writer Geo Dumitrescu (Les Fleurs du mal. Florile răului, Editura pentru literatură universală, 1968). The following period witnessed a drop in receptivity or, in Alina Irimescu's words, a "historical void". A reissue of his novels came only in 1984, care of Mircea Zaciu and Mioara Apolzan. This project suffered from the intervention of communist censors, and the parts considered scandalous or political were simply bracketed out in the final printed edition.

In the literary underground, Bonciu enjoyed some popularity among the Optzeciști writers—some of whom were disciples of Crohmălniceanu, trying to reconnect themselves with the 1930s avant-garde. Poet-novelist Mircea Cărtărescu became a noted supporter of Bonciu's reconsideration, and listed him among the direct precursors of Romania's postmodern literature. Published later in Cărtărescu's life, the Orbitor cycle is seen by Irimescu as evidence of Cărtărescu's debt to Bonciu and Blecher. Another member of the Optzeciști clubs, poet Florin Iaru, has also been described as one in succession to Bonciu, particularly in what concerns the Expressionist imagery of his poems. Sonia Larian, a more senior author (but one whose work was only published in the 1980s), is also seen as a disciple of Bonciu, for her scenes of Jewish life in Bucharest.

Bonciu's comeback took place only after the fall of communism in 1989. In subsequent years, his name was popularized by specialized dictionaries and encyclopedias, and in reinterpretative essays on literary history. In 2000, Aius Publishers in Craiova released a third, uncensored, edition of his two novels, but the circulation was exceedingly small. A year later, Bonciu failed to make the Observator Cultural "best Romanian novels" list, compiled from interviews with Romanian literary professionals. At the time, his absence was considered surprising by Observator Cultural editor Gheorghe Crăciun.

In 2005, the Writers' Union magazine România Literară published samples of Bonciu's poetry, within a special avant-garde issue. At the same time, Polirom publishing house issued both Bagaj... and Pensiunea as a single edition. It carries a preface by Babeți, and is a conscious attempt to reassess Bonciu as one of the major Romanian writers of his time. The reception was lukewarm and the iconoclastic intent criticized by other specialists. Ion Simuț notes that, unlike Blecher, "H. Bonciu does not represent a real challenge to the consecrated hierarchy of interwar assets. From this side, there is no hope that one could modify the [literature] canon."

In the Bonciu chapter of his own companion to Romanian literature (published 2008), Nicolae Manolescu suggested that the author of Bagaj... was more gifted than consecrated novelists such as Gib Mihăescu. That pronouncement was questioned by Manolescu's younger colleague, Paul Cernat. During a far-reaching literary debate of late 2008, Cernat has also criticized those postmodern authors who, in his view, overrate H. Bonciu and Constantin Fântâneru to the detriment of interwar classics. Such conclusions were mirrored by other authors. As one of Bonciu's defenders, Irimescu sees him as one "condemned to endure outside the literary canon", who would not receive recognition "either because of the times, or because of the people." Essayist Magda Ursache made particularly strong comments regarding perceived attempts at revising the canon "with the help of a hammer", to favor Bonciu and other avant-garde writers.

The revival of erotic prose in post-Revolution literature has also led reviewers to suggest that the "generation 2000" was, or could have been, influenced by Bagaj... or Pensiunea. However, according to a 2010 article by Radu Cosașu, "nobody today remembers Bonciu".
