= Valentin Păduroiu =

Romanian politician (born 1961)

Member of the Chamber of Deputies of Romania
- In office 2000–2004

Personal details
- Born: 18 October 1961 (age 64)
- Party: Greater Romania Party (until 2001); Social Democratic Party (2001–2021); Alliance for the Homeland (2021-2023)

Valentin Păduroiu (born 18 October 1961) is a Romanian politician, former deputy between 2000 and 2004. He was also the acting president of the Alliance for the Homeland.

== Biography ==
Păduroiu was born in 1961, and graduated from the Mircea cel Bătrân Naval Academy. He worked as an electromechanical engineer and as a naval officer.

He was a member of the Chamber of the Deputies between 2000 and 2004, being a Member of the Greater Romania Party. In 2001 he joined the Social Democratic Party. A close acquaintance of Codrin Ștefănescu and Liviu Dragnea, he was one of the founding members of the Alliance for the Homeland. He was the acting president of the party, until he was succeeded by Liviu Pop.
