= Radu Tudoran =

Romanian writer

Radu Tudoran (Romanian pronunciation: [ˈradu tudoˈran]; born Nicolae Bogza; March 8, 1910 – November 18, 1992) was a popular Romanian novelist.

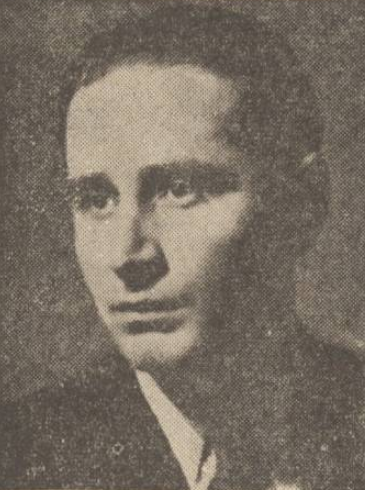

He was born Nicolae Bogza in Blejoi, Prahova County, the younger brother of Geo Bogza, and son of Alexandru Bogza.

After graduating from the military high school at Dealu Monastery in 1930, and the military academy from Sibiu in 1932, he served as an officer in the Romanian Land Forces until 1938. Afterwards he dedicated himself to writing novels, such as Toate pînzele sus! (1954), Un port la răsărit (1941), Dunărea revărsată (1961), Flăcări (1945), and Întoarcerea fiului risipitor (1947). He also translated books from French and Russian.

He died of heart disease brought by arteriosclerosis at Fundeni Hospital, în Bucharest.

Streets in Cluj-Napoca and Timișoara are named after him; middle schools in Blejoi and Brăila also bear his name.
