= Radu Mazăre =

Romanian politician

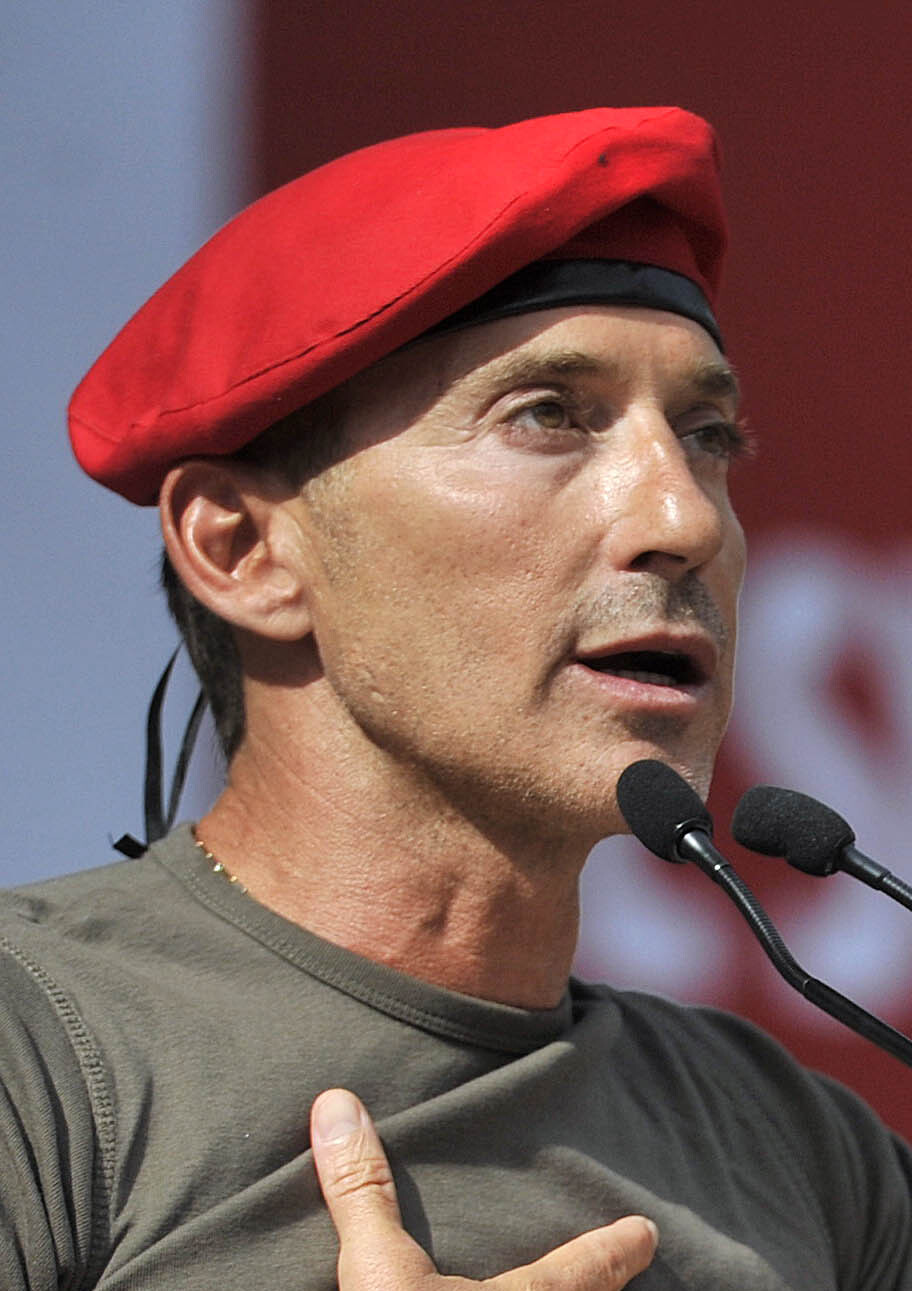
- Radu Mazăre, in 2014

Mayor of Constanța
- In office June 2000 – May 2015
- Preceded by: Gheorghe Mihăeși
- Succeeded by: Decebal Făgădău

Member of the Chamber of Deputies of Romania for Constanța County
- In office November 27, 1996 – June 27, 2000

Personal details
- Born: July 5, 1968 (age 58) Bucharest, Socialist Republic of Romania
- Party: Democratic Party (1995–1997); Independent (1997–2003); Social Democratic Party (since 2003)
- Education: Mircea cel Bătrân Naval Academy
- Profession: Electromechanical engineer

Radu Ștefan Mazăre (born 5 July 1968) is a Romanian ex-politician. His political activity began with his election to the lower house of the Parliament on the Democratic Party (PD) list, which he left in 1997 to serve as an independent. In 2000, he defeated all party-supported contestants to be elected mayor of Constanța, one of Romania's largest cities and its foremost seaport. Joining the Social Democratic Party (PSD) in 2003, he went on to win the following three elections with a comfortable majority. In 2015, during his fourth term, Mazăre resigned amid accusations of corruption, citing the unbearable stress caused by what he claimed to be politically motivated investigations. In 2017, he fled while under bail to Madagascar, claiming the right of asylum, but he was extradited back to Romania on 20 May 2019 to serve a 9-year sentence in prison. His brother, Alexandru Mazăre, also served as an MP.

== Education ==
He is a graduate of the Mircea cel Bătrân Naval Academy (Electromechanics Department) in Constanța, class of 1991.

== Career ==
He founded the now-defunct Telegraf newspaper, the now-defunct Neptun TV channel, and was a shareholder of the Conpress Holding. He joined the Democratic Party (PD) and was elected to the Chamber of Deputies in 1996. He later resigned due to "differences between electoral promises and [the] realities of government".

== Controversies ==
He is considered one of the top 300 richest people in Romania and was accused of being a so-called "local baron" of the Social Democratic Party (PSD).

In November 2008, The Diplomat reported that the National Anti-corruption Department had accused Mazăre, along with 36 other municipal employees, of corruption, abuse of public service, forgery, and criminal complicity. The group was charged with giving €114 million ($144 million) worth of state-owned land along the coast of the Black Sea and public beaches in Constanța and Mamaia to individuals, including Mazăre's family. Mazăre was awarded 5,000 Romanian Lei in damages after the Anti-corruption Department refused to provide information about the qualification of the experts.

Another controversial event took place in July 2009 when, during a fashion show, Mazăre participated wearing a Nazi Wehrmacht uniform, together with his son, who was also wearing a Nazi uniform. He explained that he "always liked this uniform, and admired the rigorous organization of the German army". According to Mazăre, "I checked it before I put it on but the swastika was very small and I didn't see it". Two days later he issued a public apology to Jewish organisations, declaring that by wearing the uniform he wanted to pay homage to Claus von Stauffenberg, a leading member of the failed plot to kill Adolf Hitler during World War II.

Radu Mazăre in the year 2003 introduced the "tax for increasing the degree of peace and security in carrying out economic activities in Constanța, Mamaia and Sat Vacanţa" (taxa pentru creșterea gradului de liniște și siguranță în derularea activităților economice în Constanța, Mamaia și Sat Vacanță). This tax was attacked and canceled by the prefect of Constanța county Dănuț Culețu in 2006. Although this tax was considered abusive, it was reintroduced in disagreement with 31,337 debtors from Constanța, in 2009. Among the population, this tax was also called: "Mazăre's Protection tax" or "The Al Capone Tax". The tax remained uncontested until 2015, when the president of the ACIA, civic activist Andrei Popescu, initiated a campaign to collect signatures to end this abuse. The campaign had a real support from the people of Constanta, gathering over 7,000 signatories.

In early 2015, Mazăre was placed under indictment and investigated for corruption-related offenses by the National Anticorruption Directorate.

In July 2017, after nine years of trial, Mazăre was convicted and given a three-year suspended sentence for the illegal sales.

At the end of 2017, Mazăre fled to Madagascar, where he owns a holiday resort, asking for the right of asylum.

In May 2018, Mazăre received a six and a half-year prison sentence for abuse of power in a case related to the sale of a 15,000 sqm-plot of land in the Mamaia resort, subject to appeal. Subsequently, on 8 February 2019, Mazăre was handed a final 9-year imprisonment sentence in the Mamaia affair. In May 2019 he was repatriated to Romania under an international warrant, to serve 9 years in prison. He was liberated from Jilava Prison 5 years later.

== See also ==
- List of corruption scandals in Romania
