= Tiberiu-Liviu Chodan =

- Born: Tiberiu-Liviu Chodan; 14 February 1959 (age 67); Vatra Moldoviței, Romania
- Military career
- Allegiance: Romania
- Branch: Romanian Naval Forces
- Service years: 1982–present
- Rank: General

Tiberiu-Liviu Chodan (born 14 February 1959) is a Romanian naval officer. He has been the naval commander of the Romanian Navy since 2014.

== Biography ==
Tiberiu-Liviu Chodan was born on 14 February 1959.

From 1974 to 1978, Chodan attended the military school "Ștefan cel Mare" in Câmpulung Moldovenesc. He then went to the "Mircea cel Bătrân" Naval Institute until 1982. Since 1982 he has been working for the Romanian Navy.

The first position he was assigned, after graduation, was as commander of the Combat and Transmission Observation Unit on board a torpedo star, and after a year, he was promoted to torpedo star commander.

In 1988, he was appointed commander of the Torpedo Stars Section, a position he held until 1992, when he became a student of the Faculty of Command and General Staff of the Mircea cel Bătrân Naval Academy. Upon graduation, in 1994, he was appointed Chief of Staff of the 81st Torpedo Division, and in 1997 he was appointed commander of this division. From 2000 to 2001, he was the head of the Research Office at the 9th Joint Operational Command "Dobrogea", and from 2001 to 2005, he was Chief of Staff at the Naval Training Base and, after the restructuring of the unit, Chief of Staff at the Training Center of the Naval Forces.

In 2006, he was appointed commander of the Naval Forces Application School. From 2007 to 2010, he was the head of the Doctrines, Regulations and Standardization Section of the Naval Forces General Staff. In 2010, he was appointed Chief of Staff at the Fleet Command.

In 2010 he received the "Man of the Year" Distinction in the Ministry of National Defense.

In 2012, he has held the position of Commander of the Naval Operational Component of the General Staff of the Naval Forces.

Throughout his career, Chodan developed his professional training, graduating, in 2004, the Postgraduate Training Course in Leadership - Naval Forces, in 2006, Intercategory College of Defense Forces - Naval Forces section, from France, and, in 2013, the postgraduate training course in the field of national security and defense at the National Defense College. For the results obtained, throughout his military career he was awarded the honorary signs "In the Service of the Fatherland", the Emblem of Merit "In the Service of the Romanian Army" class II, the Emblem of Honor of the General Staff and the Emblem of Honor of the Forces Naval.

On 7 January 2014, by order of the Minister of National Defense, Chodan was appointed Commander of the Fleet.

In May 2015, Chodon was one of the Romanian people sanctioned by Russia during the Russo-Ukrainian War.
