= Mircea cel Bătrân Naval Academy =

Naval academy for the Romanian Naval Forces

Coordinates: 44°11′01″N 28°37′09″E

- Academia Navală "Mircea cel Bătrân"
- Academy Logo
- Type: Naval academy
- Established: 1872
- Rector: Alecu Toma
- Administrative staff: 150
- Students: 1,600
- Location: Constanța, Romania
- Website: www.anmb.ro

The Mircea cel Bătrân Naval Academy (Romanian: Academia Navală "Mircea cel Bătrân") is a higher education institution based in the Black Sea port of Constanța that educates future officers for the Romanian Naval Forces, as well as maritime officers and engineers for the merchant marine. At the request of the Romanian Coast Guard, the Naval Academy prepares coast guard officers.

== History ==
The Naval Academy has its roots in the Flotila School established in the Danubian port of Galați in 1872. After the reorganization of the Romanian military education, naval higher education was assigned to the School of Application for Marine Junior Officers, established in Galați in 1896 and transferred to Constanța in 1901. The school was reorganised in 1906 as the Superior Naval School, only to be disbanded during World War I, due to the occupation of Dobruja by the Central Powers. A Naval School was reestablished in Constanța in 1920, with a Section for Merchant Marine established in 1938.

After World War II it was reorganized and renamed several times until 1969, when it was named School for active Navy officers "Mircea cel Bătrân", after Mircea the Elder, a Wallachian voivode who ruled the Dobrujan coast in the late 14th century. In 1972, a separate university, the Merchant Marine Institute (Romanian: Institutul de Marină Civilă), was created for the commercial navy. In 1973, the two institutions merged, forming the Navy Institute "Mircea cel Bătrân". This was reorganized in 1990, when it also received its present name.

== Faculties ==
The academy has 2 faculties:

- Faculty of Navigation and Naval Management
- Faculty of Marine Engineering and a discrete department, the
- Life-Long Learning and Technological Transfer Department

== Notable alumni ==
- Traian Băsescu
- Geo Bogza
- Eugeniu Botez (Jean Bart)
- Tiberiu-Liviu Chodan
- Constantin Costăchescu
- Dorin Dănilă
- Radu Mazăre
- Valentin Păduroiu

== See also ==
- Tall Ship Mircea, the main training ship for the cadets of the Academy
