= Alexandru Tudor-Miu =

Romanian poet (1901–1961)

Alexandru Tudor-Miu (February 25, 1901 – July 26, 1961) was a Romanian poet.

Born into a peasant family in Brazi, Prahova County, he attended primary school in his native village, followed by high school at Ploiești. Between 1918 and 1920, he worked as a schoolteacher in Pantazi, in his native county. In 1921, he was a laboratory assistant at the refinery in Câmpina, and was subsequently employed by Concordia-Electrica company. From 1945 until his death, he headed the electrotechnical school in Câmpina. Together with Geo Bogza, he began the local surrealist movement. Inspired by the latter's magazine Urmuz, he founded and edited three more: Câmpina (1927-1929), Prahova (1930) and Strada (1932-1936). His first poetry was published in Ploieștii literari in 1921; his first book was the 1932 Epode. His two other volumes were Standard, poeme de petrol și energie (1934) and Întâlnire cu pasărea Phoenix (1947). Magazines that published his work include Contimporanul, Universul literar, Izbânda, Viața literară, România Literară, Națiunea and Viața Românească. He left behind three volumes of poetry in manuscript form (Albastru – poeme de mare, Steaua Doftanei and Cheia Universală), a book of newspaper reports (Excursii) and a historical monograph of Câmpinei. His poems, replete with metaphors, were written in surrealist fashion.
