= Dorin Dănilă =

Romanian naval admiral (born 1953)

Vice Admiral Dorin Dănilă (born June 29, 1953) was the Chief of the Romanian Naval Forces Staff from 3 November 2006 to 3 July 2010. He was born in Braşov. In 2010 he was promoted to the rank of vice admiral and discharged from active duty.

== Studies ==
- Mircea cel Bătrân Naval Academy
- Military Academy, Command and Staff Faculty
- Naval Post-Academic Course
- International Humanitarian Law Course
- French language Course
- Public Relations Course
- Post-Academic Course in Strategic Command, War College.

== Assignments ==
- Communications officer on board an ASW ship: 1976-1978;
- Staff Officer, Communications Branch, ASW Ship Squadron: 1978-1980;
- Commanding Officer, ASW Ship: 1980-1981;
- Deputy Commander, MCM Ship Squadron: 1983-1989;
- Operations Officer, Maritime Division (Ex. Operational Command): 1989-1990;
- Deputy Commander, ASW Ship Squadron: 1990-1994;
- Commander, ASW Ship Squadron: 1994-1999;
- Deputy Commander, ASW Ship Brigade: 1999-2000;
- Deputy Commander, Maritime Flotilla: 2000-2001;
- Chief of Doctrine and Statutes Section, Romanian Naval Forces Staff: 2001-2002;
- Commander – Diving Centre: 2002-2005;
- Commander – Naval Base: 2005-2006;
- Fleet Commander: 01.06-03.11.2006
- Chief of the Romanian Naval Forces Staff – since 03.11.2006

== Personal life ==
Dorin Dănilă is married and has one daughter.
