= Codrin Ștefănescu =

Romanian politician (born 1968)

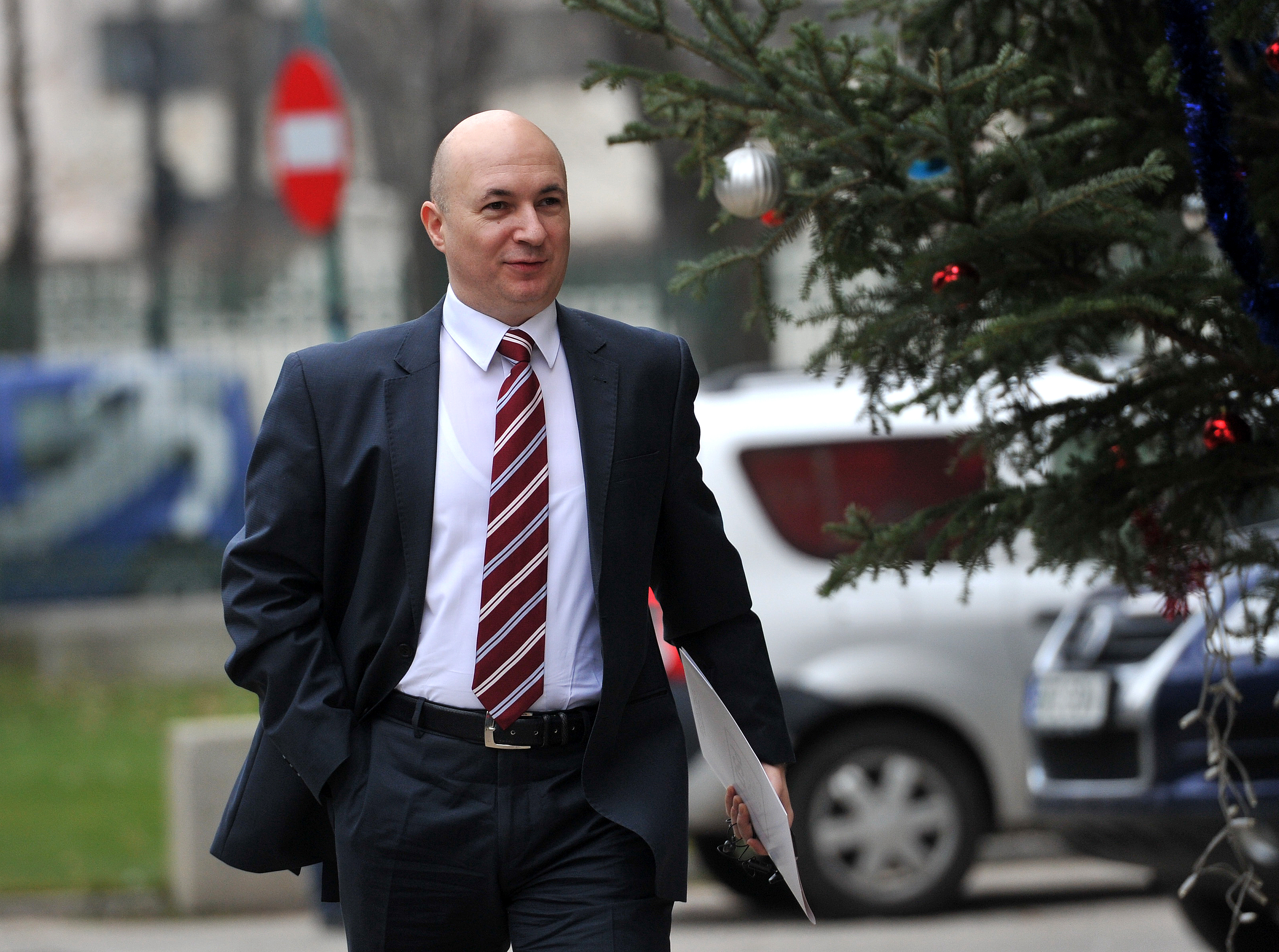

President of the Alliance for the Homeland
- In office 20 September 2021 – 2022
- Preceded by: None (position established)
- Succeeded by: Valentin Păduroiu (acting)

Member of the Chamber of Deputies of Romania
- In office 2000–2004
- Constituency: Bucharest

Personal details
- Born: 20 December 1968 (age 56); Craiova, Dolj County, Romania
- Political party: Democratic National Salvation Front (1992–1993); Social Democracy Party of Romania (1993–1999); Greater Romania Party (1999–2001, 2009–2011); Social Democratic Party (2001–2006, 2011–2021); Conservative Party (2006–2009); Alliance for the Homeland (since 2021)

Codrin Ștefănescu (born 20 December 1968) is a Romanian politician, former deputy between 2000 and 2004, and the founder of the Alliance for the Homeland (ApP).

== Studies and professional career ==
According to the CV published on the website of the Chamber of Deputies, Ștefănescu is a graduate of the Faculty of Informatics and the Faculty of International Economic Relations; universities and study cycles are not specified.

Between 1990 and 1993, Ștefănescu was attached to Europress in Bucharest, editor of culture and art history. In 1993, he founded the Young Romania Foundation, of which he was president from 1996 to 2002. After graduating, he worked as an economist at Coryllus Trading. In an interview for DCNews, Ștefănescu stated that after completing his studies he opened a brokerage firm together with several colleagues from the university, which he later sold to a consortium of banks.

== Political career ==
He participated in the 1989 Romanian Revolution in Bucharest, being among those who barricaded themselves at the Intercontinental Hotel.

In 1992 he was a founding member of the Democratic National Salvation Front (FDSN), but, in 1999 he left the Social Democracy Party of Romania (the successor of FDSN), for the Greater Romania Party (PRM), after a disagreement between him and PDSR leader Ion Iliescu. Between 2000 and 2004, Ștefănescu was a deputy in the Parliament of Romania, elected on PRM lists. He was a member of the Committee on the Investigation of Abuse, Corruption and Petitions. One year after taking office, Ștefănescu was expelled from the PRM, in the context in which, together with other party colleagues, he revealed a series of compromising information about Corneliu Vadim Tudor, leader of the party. In June 2001, he joined the Social Democratic Party (PSD). He later left the party and joined the Conservative Party (PC) in 2006. In 2009, he returned to the PRM, where he was appointed president of the PRM Bucharest branch. In 2011, he resigned from the PRM and from all the positions he previously held within the party.

Ștefănescu rejoined the PSD in 2011, and he held the position of general secretary of PSD Bucharest. Consecutively, he was appointed deputy general secretary of the party, a position he held until 2018 when it was abolished. Also in 2018, he ran for the position of general secretary of the party but lost to Marian Neacșu with 668 votes for and 3,063 against.

In September 2021, Liviu Dragnea revealed and announced that he supports a new political party, called the Alliance for the Homeland (APP), headed by Ștefănescu. According to Dragnea, the initiation of the party was Codrin's idea that the two would have talked about such an organization since October 2020 (most likely).

=== Legislative proposals ===
Ștefănescu is the initiator of Law no. 15/2003, also known as the Youth Law, and other 20 legislative proposals.

== Published books ==
- 1994: Fals și original – prelegeri din istoria artei (co-author)
- 1995: Războiul celor de sus
- 1996: Vectorul corupție
- 2002: Analiza factorială a fenomenelor social-economice în profil regional (co-author)
- 2005: Țăranul român în vechi cărți poștale ilustrate (co-author)
- 2006: Familia regală în vechi cărți poștale (co-author)

== Personal life ==
Between 1998 and 2010, Ștefănescu had a relationship with Luiza Tănase, from which a girl, Andra, was born. Ștefănescu also has a son from the relationship with the model Alice Constantinică.
