= Alliance for the Homeland =

Nationalist political party in Romania

Alliance for the Homeland Alianța pentru Patrie
- Abbreviation: ApP
- President: Liviu Pop
- Founded: 11 September 2021
- Dissolved: 1 December 2023
- Split from: Social Democratic Party (PSD)
- Merged into: National Identity Force
- Ideology: Economic nationalism Protectionism; National conservatism Social conservatism Euroscepticism; Sovereigntism; Right-wing populism
- Political position: Right-wing to Far-right
- Colours: Blue
- Slogan: Suveranitatea României nu este o opțiune, este o obligație! ("The sovereignty of Romania is not an option, it is an obligation!")

Website
- app-romania.ro

The Alliance for the Homeland (Romanian: Alianța pentru Patrie, ApP, formerly known as PAINE) was a nationalist political party in Romania.

== History ==
The party was founded on 19 September 2021 by Codrin Ștefănescu and promoted by Liviu Dragnea, who was the leader of the Social Democratic Party (PSD) between 2015 and 2019 until his judicial demise. Dragnea holds no position in the party, as he is barred from political offices until 2024.

Dragnea explained to have agreed with Ștefănescu on the idea of founding their own party in October 2020 and in May 2021, and the party's name was first registered in court by four other people. Dragnea's early release from prison on 15 July 2021 served as a pre-announcement. Dragnea criticized the PSD for not being an effective opposition party, and for changing course under the leadership that replaced him following his conviction. Dragnea added that if he were to return to politics in any form, he would need people to work with, and did not rule out founding his own party.

The party was merged into the National Identity Force Party, led by ex-minister Ilan Laufer, on 1 December 2023.

== Ideology ==
Both Dragnea and Ștefănescu originate from the PSD. Their platform promotes economic nationalism and Romanian nationalism. It is Eurosceptic and advocates familialism. Dragnea explained that Ștefănescu's intent was to create a new party "that is not riddled with compromisers, with insiders".

Although it maintains a left-wing outlook, the party's slogan calls for the return of the national sovereignty of Romania. Dragnea commented that it is "not a radical, xenophobic, anti-European party", and focuses on welfare. Ștefănescu was elected as Member of Parliament in 2000 for the radical right populist Greater Romania Party (PRM). It was also described as national-populist.

The manifesto on the party's website describes it as "a national party that advocates for the homeland, the family, national identity and pride, the well-being of every Romanian and the traditional historical, cultural, moral and religious values of the Romanian people". It aims to tackle the demographics of Romania's population exodus and the decrease of Romania regions by Human Development Index, and seeks to end abusive investigations and legal threats. It opposes alleged dangerous chemicals put in foreign food imports, the population's "biological degradation", and the alleged unpatriotic "progressive, neo-Marxist politicians" who are "acting at the behest of foreigners".

Political scientist Ioan Bogdan Lefter described the party as ultranationalist and similar to Vladimir Putin's United Russia.

== See also ==
- Cultural Marxism conspiracy theory
- Genetically modified food controversies
- National conservatism
- Politics of Romania
- Right-wing populism
