= Geo Bogza =

Romanian avant-garde theorist, poet and journalist (1908 - 1993)

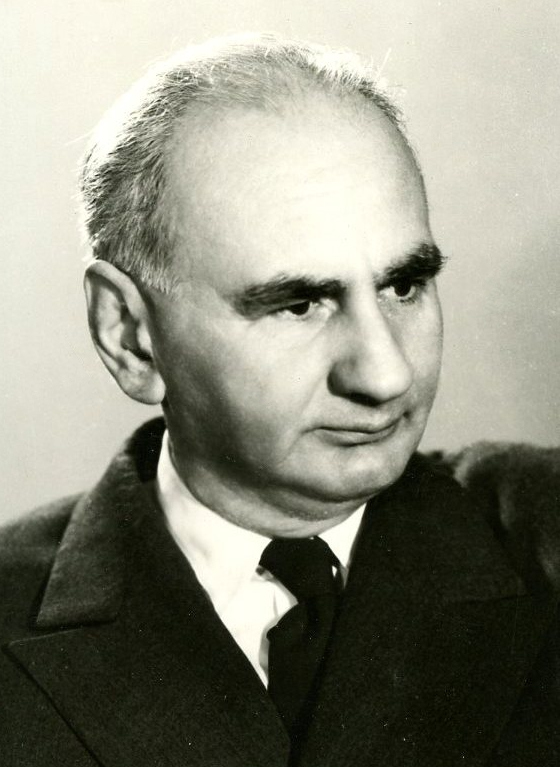
- Born: Gheorghe Bogza; February 6, 1908; Blejoi, Prahova County, Kingdom of Romania
- Died: September 14, 1993 (aged 85); Bucharest, Romania
- Education: Naval Academy
- Occupations: poet, essayist, journalist
- Relatives: Alexandru Bogza (father); Radu Tudoran (brother)
- Writing career
- Period: 1928–1993
- Genres: lyric poetry, free verse, prose poetry, reportage, satire
- Movements: Avant-garde; Surrealism; Socialist realism

Geo Bogza (Romanian pronunciation: [ˈd͡ʒe.o ˈboɡza]; born Gheorghe Bogza; February 6, 1908 – September 14, 1993) was a Romanian avant-garde theorist, poet, and journalist, known for his left-wing and communist political convictions. As a young man in the interwar period, he was known as a rebel and was one of the most influential Romanian Surrealists. Several of his controversial poems twice led to his imprisonment on grounds of obscenity, and saw him partake in the conflict between young and old Romanian writers, as well as in the confrontation between the avant-garde and the far right. At a later stage, Bogza won acclaim for his many and accomplished reportage pieces, being one of the first to cultivate the genre in Romanian literature, and using it as a venue for social criticism.

After the establishment of Communist Romania, Bogza adapted his style to Socialist realism, and became one of the most important literary figures to have serviced the government. With time, he became a subtle critic of the regime, especially under the rule of Nicolae Ceaușescu, when he adopted a dissident position. Beginning in the late 1960s, he publicized his uncomfortable attitudes as subtext to apparently innocent articles and essays. An editor for Viața Românească and România Literară magazines, Geo Bogza was one of the leaders of the Romanian Writers' Union and a member of the Romanian Academy.

He was the older brother of Radu Tudoran, himself a known writer, whose political choices were in stark contrast with those of Geo Bogza, and made Tudoran the object of communist persecution. Bogza had lifelong contacts with some representatives of the Romanian avant-garde, among them Victor Brauner, Max Blecher, Sesto Pals, Sașa Pană, and Paul Păun, and was friends with, among others, the essayist and theologian Nicolae Steinhardt, the dissident Gheorghe Ursu, and the filmmaker Mircea Săucan.

== Biography ==
=== Early years and the avant-garde ===
Geo Bogza was born in Blejoi, Prahova County. At one point during the late 1930s, Bogza was irritated after reading an article authored by one of his fascist adversaries, Alexandru Hodoș (later a member of the Iron Guard). Hodoș implied that Bogza was not an ethnic Romanian, which prompted the latter to elaborate on his origins and his name. Bogza refuted the allegation by indicating that his father was originally from the village of Bogzești, in Secuieni, Neamț County, and that his mother (née Georgescu) was the daughter of a Romanian Transylvanian activist who had fled from Austria-Hungary to the Kingdom of Romania. The lineage was confirmed by literary critic George Călinescu as part of a short biographical essay.

Geo Bogza, who indicated that he was baptized Romanian Orthodox, also stressed that his given name, Gheorghe, had been turned into the hypocoristic Geo while he was still a child, and that he had come to prefer the shortened form. During the early stages of his career, he is known to have signed writings with the name George Bogza (George being a variant of Gheorghe).

Bogza attended school in Ploiești and trained as a sailor at the Naval Academy in Constanța, but never sought employment in the Romanian Naval Forces. Until the age of 28, he made part of his income as a sailor on a commercial vessel. He returned to his native Prahova County, lived in Buștenari, and eventually settled in Bucharest.

In 1927, he made his debut in poetry, writing for the Prahova-based modernist magazine Câmpina, which was edited by poet Alexandru Tudor-Miu. The following year, he contributed to Sașa Pană's avant-garde magazine unu (also known as Unu), edited a short-lived Surrealist and anti-bourgeois magazine that drew inspiration from Urmuz (and was titled after that writer), and published in Tudor Arghezi's Bilete de Papagal. Arghezi admired the younger writer, and he is credited with having suggested the name Urmuz for the magazine.

During that period, Geo Bogza became one of the most recognizable young rebellious authors, a category that also included, among others, Marcel Avramescu, Gherasim Luca, Paul Păun, Constantin Nisipeanu, and Sesto Pals. In time, he became a noted contributor to the leftist and socialist press, and one of the most respected Romanian authors of reportage prose. One of his articles-manifestos read: "I always had the uncomfortable impression that any beauty may enter the consciousness of a bourgeois only on all fours [italics in the original]." Writing for Urmuz, he condemned convention as "a false sun" and "intellectual acrobatics", depicting his magazine as "a lash that whips the mind".

Winning the praise of his fellow young authors Stephan Roll and Ilarie Voronca, he was criticized by prominent literary figure George Călinescu, who accused him of "priapism", based on Bogza's irreverent tone and erotic imagery. It was also during the late 1920s that Bogza began touring the Prahova Valley, becoming a close observer of local life in the shadow of the oil industry. He had a conflict with Tudor-Miu in August 1928, after the latter modified a poem Bogza sent to be published in Câmpina—the two reconciled later in the year, and later wrote a special poem for its one-year anniversary. His collaboration with Pană, Roll, Ion Vinea, Simion Stolnicu, and others led to the ad hoc establishment of a literary group, which was defined by writer and critic Camil Petrescu as "the revolutionaries from Câmpina" (after the town where Bogza spend much of his time). Among other writers who joined Bogza in publishing the five issues of Urmuz were Voronca and the Dadaist Tristan Tzara.

He also established a friendship and collaboration with the photographer Iosif Bernea and the painter Victor Brauner, and was close to the writer and future Orthodox hermit Nicolae Steinhardt. After 1930, he was involved in polemics with traditionalist young authors, including poet Otilia Cazimir (whom he accused of writing with "hypocrisy") and members of the eclectic grouping known as Criterion (who, he claimed, were guilty of "ridicule and opportunism"). His relations with Arghezi also grew more distant, after Bogza expressed disapproval for Arghezi's 1930 decision to collaborate with the Romanian Radio—Geo Bogza drew attention to his older colleague's previous public statements, in which he had criticized the national station on various grounds.

Early in his youth, while in Buștenari, Geo Bogza met and fell in love with Elisabeta (also known as Bunty), whom he married soon after. Their love affair was celebrated by Bogza's friend Nicolae Tzone, who also stated that she "lived simply and without any sort of commotion in his shadow". Initially, the couple lived in Sașa Pană's Bucharest house, and, for a while afterwards, at the headquarters of unu. In old age, he spoke of one of these lodgings as "an unsanitary loft, where one would either suffocate from the heat or starve with cold."

=== Trials and jail terms ===
Bogza's work was at the center of scandals in the 1930s: he was first arrested on charges of having produced pornography in 1930, for his Sex Diary, and was temporarily held in Văcărești Prison, until being acquitted. At the time, he responded to the hostile atmosphere by publishing an article in unu which included the words "ACADEMICIANS, SHAVE YOUR BRAINS! [capitals in the original]" (also rendered as "disinfect your brains!"). In reference to his trial, the magazine unu wrote: "Bogza will be tried and receive punishment for having the imprudence of not letting himself be macerated by «proper behavior», for having dunked his arms down to the feces, for having raised them up to his nose, smelling them and then spattering all those who were dabbling with their nostrils unperceptive of his exasperated nature." Other positive reactions to his writings notably included that of teachers at a high school in Ploiești, who invited him to attend a celebration marking the start of the school year.

Reportedly, Bogza asked to be defended by Ionel Teodoreanu, a known writer who had training in law, but he was ultimately represented by Ionel Jianu. After his success in court, he issued business cards reading: "GEO BOGZA/ACQUITTED/NOVEMBER 28, 1932 [capitals in the original]". Late in 1933, he edited a new magazine, titled Viața Imediată ("The Immediate Life"), of which only one issue was ever published. Its cover photograph showed a group of derelict workers (it was titled Melacolia celor șezând pe lângă ziduri, "The Melancholy of Those Sitting by the Walls").

The same year, he was taken into custody for a second time, after publishing his Offensive Poem—which depicted his sexual encounter with a servant girl—and was sentenced to six days in jail; in 1937, at the same time as H. Bonciu, Bogza again served time for Offensive Poem, after the matter was brought up by Ioan Alexandru Brătescu-Voinești on behalf of the Romanian Academy. Similar demands for punishment were voiced by historian Nicolae Iorga and by the poet and fascist politician Octavian Goga. Bogza was frequently attacked by Iorga's nationalist magazine Cuget Clar. During the same period, his friends and fellow Surrealists Luca and Pals were also jailed on similar charges, after they were denounced by Iorga. Other young authors imprisoned on such grounds included Păun, Aurel Baranga, and Jules Perahim.

Writing for Azi, a review edited by Zaharia Stancu, Bogza dismissed the accusation as a cover-up for an increase in authoritarianism as King Carol II was attempting to compete with the fascist Iron Guard. The latter's press welcomed the move, and, using strong antisemitic language, instigated the authorities to intervene in similar cases of alleged obscenity—which it viewed as characteristic of both Surrealism and the Jewish-Romanian authors who were associated with Bogza.

In 1934, while visiting Brașov in the company of his wife, Bogza met Max Blecher, a young man who was beddriden by Pott's disease and had started work on the novel later known as Întâmplări din irealitatea imediată ("Events in Immediate Unreality"). The three were to become good friends, and Bogza encouraged him to continue writing.

=== Adoption of communism and official status ===
His growing sympathy for communism and his connections with the outlawed Romanian Communist Party (PCR) made Bogza a target of the authorities' surveillance. Siguranța Statului, the country's secret service, kept a file on him, which contained regular reports by unknown informers. One of them claims: "given that he was a communist, [Bogza] covered the puberty of his writing in the cape of social revolt."

Late in 1937, Geo Bogza traveled to Spain as a war correspondent in the Civil War, supporting the Republican side. His position of the time drew comparisons with those of other leftist intellectuals who campaigned against or fought Nationalist forces, including W. H. Auden and George Orwell. He was accompanied on this journey by Constantin Lucreția Vâlceanu, who had ambitions of becoming a writer, and whom Bogza asked to contribute to a never-completed novel inspired by the war. Soon after their return, in what was a surprising gesture, Vâlceanu split with the leftist camp and rallied with the Iron Guard.

The writer had grown close to the PCR, but their relations soured c. 1940, when Bogza was confronted with news that the Soviet Union and Nazi Germany had signed a non-aggression pact. Physician G. Brătescu, who maintained contacts with Sașa Pană and other figures in the Romanian avant-garde and, like him, was then a Communist Party militant, recorded that, by 1943, there was a hint of tension between Pană and Bogza. Bogza did not however cut off links with Surrealism, and was one of the few to be acquainted with the literature of his friend Sesto Pals, which he later helped promote at home and abroad.

After World War II and the establishment of a communist regime, the writer adopted and included in his works the themes of Socialist realism, and was awarded several honors. During the 1950s, he traveled extensively to the Soviet Union and Latin America, writing several works on topics such as Decolonization. In 1955, Bogza became a full member of the Romanian Academy.

Historian Vladimir Tismăneanu indicated that he was one of the few genuine left-wing intellectuals associated with the regime during the 1950s—alongside Anatol E. Baconsky, Ovid Crohmălniceanu, Geo Dumitrescu, Petru Dumitriu, Paul Georgescu, Gheorghe Haupt, Eugen Jebeleanu, Mihail Petroveanu, and Nicolae Tertulian. According to Tismăneanu, this group was able to interpret the cultural policies endorsed by Romania's leader Gheorghe Gheorghiu-Dej after the Hungarian Revolution of 1956 threatened to disrupt communism in neighboring countries, when the regime turned against advocates of liberalization such as Miron Constantinescu, Mihail Davidoglu, Alexandru Jar, and Ion Vitner. Commenting on this, Tismăneanu noted that Geo Bogza and all others failed to distance himself from the new repressive mood, and that the group's silence indirectly helped chief ideologist Leonte Răutu and his subordinate Mihai Beniuc to restore effective control over the Romanian Writers' Union.

Bogza was, however, skeptical about the goals of the PCR, and his support for it was much reduced in time. Literary historian Eugen Simion discussed the writer's effort to tone down the scale of cultural repression, and included him among the "decent men" to have done so. Bogza's brother Radu Tudoran, an anti-communist who had risked a prison sentence in the late 1940s after attempting to flee the country, was condemned by the communist press, and lived in relative obscurity.

In 1958, Geo Bogza himself was exposed to official criticism in the official Communist Party paper, Scînteia, which claimed that he and other writers had been exposed to "bourgeois tendencies" and "cosmopolitanism", no longer caring about "the desires of the Romanian people". This subject drew attention in the Socialist Federal Republic of Yugoslavia, a country which, under Josip Broz Tito, had engaged on an independent path and was criticizing the Eastern Bloc countries for their commitment to Stalinism (see Titoism). In an article he contributed to Borba, Yugoslav writer Marko Ristić, who spoke of the Romanian as "my friend [...], the nostalgic, gifted and loyal Geo Bogza", took the Scînteia campaign as proof that the Gheorghiu-Dej regime was still reminiscent of Joseph Stalin's. Ristić, who feared the purpose and effect such attacks had on Romanian culture, noted that Bogza had "in vain, done his utmost, by trying to adapt himself to the circumstances, not to betray himself, even in the period when Stalin alone [...] was solving esthetic problems, appraising artistic works and giving the tone in his well-known method."

In February 1965, as Gheorghiu-Dej was succumbing to cancer, the Writers' Union Conference facilitated an unprecedented attack on Socialist Realism. This dispute saw writers attacking Union president Beniuc, who was identified with Stalinism—as a result of the confrontation, in what was an early sign of liberalization, Beniuc was dismissed from his post, and replaced with Zaharia Stancu. According to literary historian Valeriu Râpeanu, Bogza, who attended the Conference, went so far as to demand that Beniuc's chair be burned.

=== In opposition to Ceaușescu ===
A member of the Writers' Union leadership board after 1965, he was editor of the influential literary magazine Viața Românească. Despite his official status, Bogza himself was critical of the adoption of nationalist themes in official discourse after the ascendancy of Nicolae Ceaușescu in the 1960s. The new doctrine, eventually consecrated in Ceaușescu's July Theses, saw him taking the opposing side: during the early 1970s, Bogza published pieces in which he voiced covert criticism of the new policies. Tismăneanu cited him among the most important intellectuals of various backgrounds to have done so, in a class also comprising members of the Oniric group, as well as the cultural figures Jebeleanu, Ion Caraion, Ștefan Augustin Doinaș, Dan Hăulică, Nicolae Manolescu, Alexandru Paleologu, and Mircea Zaciu. His nonconformist stance drew comparisons with that assumed by his generation colleague, the ethnic Hungarian poet and prominent Writers' Union member József Méliusz. In 1976, Bogza discussed the issue of disappointment, stating: "Life is not like a tournament, but like an outage. From the first to the last day." In reference to such an attitude, which believed was related the political context, literary critic and novelist B. Elvin, himself a former leftist and dissident, saw in Bogza a symbol of "verticality, refusal, contempt".

Bogza was nonetheless often ambiguous in his relations with the authorities, while his public statements oscillated between covert satire and open praise. Between 1966 and 1973, he was a contributor to Contemporanul magazine, and was well known in Romania for regularly publishing short essays in that magazine (some of them were also read on national radio). Bogza also had a permanent column in the influential magazine România Literară. His gestures of defiance include his display of support for Lucian Pintilie, a director whose work was being censored. In 1968, having just seen Pintilie's subversive film The Reenactment shortly before it was banned, Bogza scribbled in the snow set on the director's car the words: "Long live Pintilie! The humble Geo Bogza"; the statement was recorded with alarm by agents of Romania's secret police, the Securitate, who had witnessed the incident.

In the 1970s, Bogza and several of his Writers' Union colleagues became involved in a bitter conflict with the nationalist Săptămâna magazine, which was led by novelist Eugen Barbu (who was also one of the persons overseeing censorship in Communist Romania). In 1979, România Literară published evidence that, in his writings, Barbu had plagiarized works of Russian literature. Rumors spread that Geo Bogza had orchestrated the scandal, after he had been confronted with an initiative to transform the Union into a "Union of Communist Writers". The latter initiative was recorded by the Securitate, who, in a report of 1978, attributed it to Barbu and poet Adrian Păunescu. According to various speculations made ever since, Bogza contacted one of Barbu's former protegés, who admitted that he had earlier copied texts by various authors to be selectively included in Eugen Barbu's novels.

In autumn 1980, the Securitate, was alarmed of his alleged intention to condemn the country's officials for allowing antisemitism to be expressed in the press. This came after nationalist poet Corneliu Vadim Tudor signed an article in Săptămâna, which outraged representatives of the Jewish community. Romania's Chief Rabbi, Moses Rosen, was quoted saying that Tudor's piece was evidence of "fascism" and the prosecutable offense of "instigations to racial hatred". A Securitate note, published by Ziua journal in 2004, claimed that Rosen was preparing to bring up for debate the issue of antisemitism in Romanian society, and depicted Bogza, alongside Jebeleanu and Dan Deșliu, as "exercising influence" over the Rabbi in order to have him "publicly demand the unmasking of «antisemitism» in the S[ocialist] R[epublic] of Romania".

=== End of communism and final years ===
Bogza was also close to the outspoken dissident Gheorghe Ursu (who, in 1985, was beaten to death on orders from the Securitate), as well as to filmmaker Mircea Săucan, himself an adversary of the communist regime. One theory attributes Ursu's violent death to him having refused to incriminate his writer friends during interrogations—among those whose activities may have interested the investigators were Bogza, Nina Cassian, and Iordan Chimet.

In late March 1989, ten months before the Romanian Revolution overthrew communism, Bogza, together with Paleologu, Doinaș, Hăulică, Octavian Paler, Mihail Șora, and Andrei Pleșu, signed the Letter of the Seven, addressed to Dumitru Radu Popescu (head of the Writers' Union) in protest over poet Mircea Dinescu's house arrest by the Securitate. Yosef Govrin, who served as Israel's Ambassador to Romania during that time, commented on the document, which was sent to members of the diplomatic corps and to other circles: "Despite its restrained style, the letter sharply accused the Writers' Union for not having defended its members and for the alienation rife between Romanian culture and its themes."

During the final stages of his life, Geo Bogza granted a series of interviews to journalist Diana Turconi, who published them as Eu sunt ținta ("I Am the Target"). He died in Bucharest, after being hospitalized for a while at the local Elias Hospital.

== Work ==
=== Avant-garde aesthetics ===
Geo Bogza's lifelong but uneven involvement with Surrealism has endured as a topic of interest, and was considered by many to have resulted in some of his best writings. Bogza was defined by art critic S. A. Mansbach as "the most scandalous of Romania's avant-garde poets and editor of and contributor to a plethora of its radical publications", while Sex Diary was argued to be "the touchstone of Romania's emerging Surrealist avant-garde". In 1992, the American avant-garde magazine Exquisite Corpse accompanied some of his early poems with the observation "It is the younger Bogza we love."

Much of Bogza's work is related to social criticism, reflecting his political convictions. This was the case in many of his reportage and satirical pieces. In reference to this trait, Mihuleac commented that the 20-year-old Bogza was in some ways a predecessor of later generations of protesters, such as the American Beatniks and the United Kingdom's "angry young men". In 1932, Bogza stated: "We write not because we wish to become writers, but because we are doomed to write, just as we would be condemned to insanity, to suicide."

The young Bogza made obscenity an aesthetic credo. Shortly after his acquittal, he wrote: "In order to reach a new form of nobility, one is required, beforehand, to vaccinate one's soul with mud." He elaborated: "The word must be stripped of the unctuous senses that have come to depose themselves on it. Cleansed of ash. The flame inside kindled, for the introduction of words, like that of women, is [currently] a privilege reserved for the great landowners." Geo Bogza's spoke in defense of taboo words such as căcat ("shit") and țâță ("tit"), arguing that the original frankness of Romanian profanity had been corrupted by modern society. One of his usual and highly controversial poems of the period read:

Adunați pe întâiul meridian al sexului
proxeneții continentelor
au hotărât să aleagă marele Mongol al vaginurilor
Pentru cele mai frumoase fete ale popoarelor
ziarele continentale au întocmit elogii pe mii de coloane
Pentru bijuteria vaginului premiat
miliardarii continentelor
își ascut în umbră phalusul lor de aur.

Translation:

Gathered on the first meridian of sex
the pimps of the continents
have decided to elect a great mogul of the vaginae
For the most beautiful girls of the peoples
the continental newspapers have composed eulogies on thousands of columns
For the jewel of the prized vagina
the billionaires of the continents
sharpen their golden phallus in the shadows.

As a youth, he extended his protest to the cultural establishment as a whole—while visiting the high school in Ploieşti, where he was supposed to address the staff, he attacked local educational institutions for "taking care to castrate [...] the glands of any outright affirmation", and for resembling "the Bastille". In his early prose poems, Bogza addressed workers in the oil industry in his native Prahova, claiming to define himself in relation to their work (while still appealing to the imagery of filth). The series has been defined by critic Constantin Stănescu as poems "rehabilitating, among other things, the compromised «genre» of the social poem". One such piece, published in 1929 and titled Poem cu erou ("Poem with a Hero"), documented the unusual death of a roughneck named Nicolae Ilie, who burned after his clothes caught fire. The incident was discussed in the press of his day, and the poet is credited with having personally aided in publicizing it. Bogza allegorically spoke of feeling "the țuică and pumpkin-like" smell of Nicolae Ilie's feces "every time I raise a loaf of bread or a mug of milk to my mouth". He wrote:

Mă rog de tine, Nicolae Ilie,
mântuiește-mă de cumplita duhoare
putrezește mai curând
topește-te în pământ
și rămâi numai oase albe
cum se cuvine unui martir.

Translation:

I pray of thee, Nicolae Ilie,
deliver me from the awful stench
putrefy quicker
melt in the earth
and remain just white bones
as is befitting of a martyr.

He extended an appeal to the oil industry workers, in which he identify oil with foulness and with himself:

Eu, care sunt mârșav și violent,
și care asemeni dealurilor petrolifere
am mocnit întotdeauna ceva groaznic în măruntaiele mele
eu, care pângăresc tot ce ating
eu, care asemeni petrolului sunt cum nu se poate mai pătimaș
și izbucnesc din mine
și nu-mi pasă de prăpădul pe care îl aduc în lume.
Eu, acesta, vă voi vorbi despre petrol și crimele lui.

Translation:

I, who am black and ugly,
who, like the oil-bearing hills,
have always had something horrible smoldering in my innards,
I, who soil and destroy everything I touch,
who am as foul, fervent and ignorant as oil
and, like it, explode
without caring about the calamity my words bring into the world.
That's me. Now I will tell you about oil and its crimes.

In another one of his earliest poetry works (Destrămări la ore fixe, "Unravellings at Pre-Convened Hours"), Geo Bogza elaborated on the theme of melancholy and loss:

Mari, ca și mici, ne paște același program;
un clopoțel suna atunci la ora de geografie;
azi clopotele catedralei în aer se destram
se tânguiesc chemând, la ora de melancolie.

Mă doare caietul pe care m-ai iscălit tu
în el am vrut să conturez un suflet nebulos
– dacă vei bate la ușe – eu am să strig: NU!
fiindcă m-ai găsi împrăștiat, în țăndări, pe jos.

Translation:

Big and small alike, we are destined to the same program;
a school bell was sounding the geography class;
nowadays the cathedral bells decompose in the air
they bewail calling, to the melancholy class.

My notebook that you signed hurts me presently
in it, I wished to contour a nebulous soul
—if you should knock on the door—I will shout: NO!
because you would find me scattered, splintered, on the ground.

=== Reportage and agitprop ===
One of the first and most acclaimed authors of reportage in Romanian literature, Bogza was credited by journalist Cătălin Mihuleac with establishing and "ennobling" the genre. He is occasionally cited alongside his contemporary F. Brunea-Fox, whose equally famous reportages were less artistic and had more to do with investigative journalism. Mihuleac, who noted that Bogza was "unnervingly talented", also argued that: "Romanian journalism is indebted to Geo Bogza more than to anyone else."

Also according to Mihuleac, Bogza went through a radical change around 1935, when his writing turned professional and his subjects turned from "himself" to "the multitudes". This writings were eventually structured into two main series: Cartea Oltului ("The Book of the Olt River"), and Țări de piatră, de foc, de pământ ("Lands of Stone, Fire, Earth"). The writer traveled the land in search of subjects, and the results of these investigations were acclaimed for their power of suggestion and observation.

One of his reportages of the period notably discussed the widespread poverty he had encountered during his travels to the eastern province of Bessarabia, and was titled Basarabia: Țară de pământ ("Bessarabia: Land of Soil"). In it, the writer spoke of how most tailors were almost always commissioned by locals not to produce new clothes, but to mend old ones (at a time when the larger part of family incomes in the region were spent on food and clothing). He toured the impoverished areas of Bucharest, recording activities around the city landfill and the lives of dog catchers who gassed their victims and turned them into cheap soap.

George Călinescu proposed that, "although written in the most normal of syntaxes", his pieces were still connected with avant-garde styles such as Surrealism and Dada, and answered to a call issued by unu's Paul Sterian to seek life at its purest. In parallel, Călinescu contended, Bogza's path mirrored those of Italian Futurists such as Ardengo Soffici and Filippo Tommaso Marinetti and that of the French Hussards leader Paul Morand. A reportage authored after Bogza visited the town of Mizil was also a study in experimental literature. Titled 175 de minute la Mizil ("175 Minutes in Mizil"), it has been summarized as "the adventure of the banal", and, together with a satirical sketch by his predecessor Ion Luca Caragiale, credited with having helped impress on the public Mizil's image as a place where nothing important ever happens. Similarly, his travels in Bessarabia saw him depicting Hotin as the epitome of desert places and Bălți as the source of "a pestilent stench".

In one of his satirical pieces, Bogza mocked the Romanian Post seemingly excessive regulations to have writing utensils made available for the public, but secured in place with a string:

"A million penholders stolen in Romania would almost be an act of culture. And one would [consequently] forget the degrading spectacle of people writing with chained penholders. Of what importance would any loss be, compared with the beauty of penholders having been set free?"

The next stage in Bogza's literary career was described by Mihuleac as "embarrassing". This was in reference to his assimilation of communist tenets, and his willingness to offer praise to the official heroes of Communist Party history such as Vasile Roaită (a participant in the Grivița Strike of 1933). In one such article, Bogza claimed to have witnessed the sight of proletarians who were living in "new and white-painted houses" and had manufactured business cards for themselves, proudly advertising their qualifications in the field of work and positions in the state-run factory.

More controversial still was his agitprop piece of 1950, Începutul epopeii ("The Start of the Epic"). The text praised the regime for designing and ordering work to begin on the Danube–Black Sea Canal, which, in reality, was to prove one of the harshest sites for penal labor, where thousands of political prisoners were to be killed. Historian Adrian Cioroianu cited the reportage, alongside Petru Dumitriu's Drum fără pulbere and other writings of the time, as an example of "mobilizing-deferential literature". He summarized the content of such texts as claiming to depict a "final battle, of mythological proportions, between the old and new Romania—offering [...] a clear prognostic in respect to who would win."

=== Subtle dissent ===
During the Ceaușescu years, Bogza developed a unique style, which, under the cover of apparently insignificant and docile metaphors, hid subversive messages. According to Mihuleac, the writer was critical of his own position in relation to the Communist Party and explained it as a compromise—he believed this message to be evident in Bogza's poem Treceam ("I Was Passing"):

Treceam printre tigri
Și le aruncam garoafe
Treceam printre leoparzi
Și le aruncam crizanteme
Treceam printre gheparzi
Și le aruncam trandafiri
Iar ei, cuprinși de perplexitate
Mă lăsau să trec mai departe.

Translation:

I was passing among tigers
And was throwing them carnations
I was passing among leopards
And was throwing them chrysanthemums
I was passing among cheetahs
And was throwing them roses
And they, taken over by perplexity
Allowed me to move on.

He thus wrote a piece entitled Bau Bau (Romanian for "Bogeyman"), telling of how his parents encouraged him to fear things watching him from outside his window as a means of ensuring he behaved himself while they were absent—the subtext was interpreted by journalist Victor Frunză as an allegory of Ceaușescu's anti-Soviet policies (which attempted to prevent opposition by, among other things, alluding to the threat of Soviet intervention). At some point during the second half of 1969, instead of his usual column, Geo Bogza sent for publication a drawing of three poplars, with a caption which read:

"The line of poplars above is meant to suggest not just the beauty of this autumn, but also my sympathy towards all things having a certain height and a verticality."

The poplar metaphor was one of Bogza's favorite: he had first used it in reference to himself, as early as 1931, in an interview with Sașa Pană. Facing a jail term for his scandalous poetry, he spoke of the tree as a symbol of both aloofness and his own fate.

His subtle technique, like similar ones developed by other România Literară contributors, was at times detected by the regime. Thus, a secret Securitate report of 1984, made available ten years later, read: "The present line-up of România Literară magazine is characterized by a gap between the political content of its editorials (perfectly in line [and] in which declarations of adherence are being made in respect to the state and party policies) and the content of the magazine which, of course, is different; [...] the criticism of content which is discussed on [România Literară's] front page grows aesthetizing through the rest of the magazine."

== Legacy ==
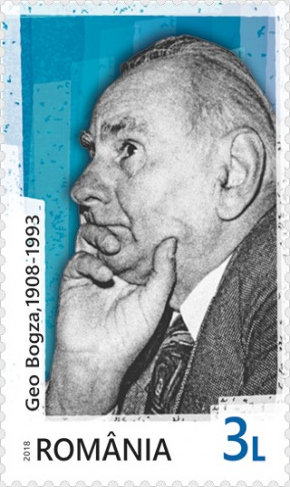
Bogza on a 2018 stamp of Romania

=== In literature ===
A central figure in Romanian literature for much of his life, Bogza took special interest in the works of other writers, and contributed to establishing their reputation. During his early period at Urmuz, he actively encouraged various avant-garde trends, and his eclectic interests, as well as his calls to intellectual rebellion played an important role in shaping the work and activity of both Constructivists and Surrealists. Among the most noted writers whom he aided to express themselves freely were his co-contributors Tristan Tzara, Stephan Roll and Ilarie Voronca, and he was also noted for being the first to publish Urmuz's Fuchsiada (a few years after its author committed suicide). Max Blecher also expressed gratitude to Geo and Ecaterina Bogza for helping him complete and publish Întâmplări din irealitatea imediată.

His role as critic, patron and promoter of art continued under the communist regime, and he kept a vivid interest in reviewing literature of all kinds. After the 1960s, he was involved in recuperating the Romanian avant-garde, and, together with Paul Păun and Marcel Avramescu, helped introduce the previously unpublished works of Sesto Pals to an international audience. In 1978, he also republished his earliest poems for Urmuz, as part of the new volume Orion. His position also allowed him to extend a degree of protection to literary figures persecuted by the authorities. According to Eugen Simion, during the 1950s, a common initiative of Bogza and philosopher Tudor Vianu attempted to rescue the academic and essayist D. D. Panaitescu from Communist imprisonment. Antonie Plămădeală, a political prisoner of the communist regime and future Romanian Orthodox Metropolitan of Transylvania, credited Bogza and the writer and theologian Gala Galaction with having insured recognition for his debut novel in spite of political obstacles.

The relevancy of Bogza's dissidence, like the similar attitudes of Eugen Jebeleanu, Marin Preda and others, was nonetheless debated by author Gheorghe Grigurcu, who described it as a "coffee-house opposition". Grigurcu, who placed stress on the closeness between these writers and dissenting but high-ranking Communist Party activists such as Gheorghe Rădulescu and George Macovescu, called attention to the fact that Bogza had refused to sign his name to an appeal for radical change, drafted by novelist Paul Goma in 1977. Reportedly, when confronted with Goma's grassroots movement, Geo Bogza had asked: "Who is this Goma person?"

Bogza often credited real-life events and persons in his poetry. Alongside Nicolae Ilie and his death, his early poems make direct references to Alexandru Tudor-Miu, to the poets Simion Stolnicu and Virgil Gheorghiu, and to Voronca's wife, Colomba. During the same stage of his career, Geo Bogza dedicated a short piece to the 19th century writer Mihai Eminescu, to whose sad poems he attributed his own momentary adolescent urge to commit suicide—as an old man, he would depose flowers at Eminescu's statue in front of the Romanian Athenaeum each January 15 (the poet's birthday). A short essay he authored late in life, titled Ogarii ("The Borzois"), drew a comparison between the breed, seen as an example of elegance, and the eccentric Symbolist author Mateiu Caragiale.

The innovative reportages he authored later in life were credited with setting guidelines and opening the road for a series of notable authors, among whom were Paul Anghel, Traian T. Coșovei, Ioan Grigorescu and Ilie Purcaru. Cornel Nistorescu, himself a columnist and author of reportage, is also seen as one of Bogza and F. Brunea-Fox's disciples. Critics have noted the potential impact his early poetry has or may have on Postmodern literature in Romania. Several commentators, including Nicolae Manolescu, have traced a connection between his poems of the 1920s and 1930s and many of those authored by Florian Iaru between 1982 and the early 2000s.

In contrast to both his status as a former political prisoner and his new-found Christian faith, Nicolae Steinhardt continued to value Bogza's contributions, and, in 1981, authored an essay dedicated to his work and their friendship. Titled Geo Bogza – un poet al Efectelor, Exaltării, Grandiosului, Solemnității, Exuberanței și Patetismului ("Geo Bogza – a Poet of Impressions, Exaltation, Grandeur, Solemnity, Exuberance and Pathetism") and edited by writer Mircea Sântimbreanu, it was characterized by literary critic Ion Bogdan Lefter as a "eulogy [...] to their shared youth, seen as a paradise of liberty". G. Brătescu, who was himself involved in editing and claims to have aided in publishing Steinhardt's volume, recalled being "fascinated" by both Bogza's "impertuosity", as well as by Steihardt's "art of evidencing such an impertuousity."

Sesto Pals also authored Epitaf pentru Geo Bogza ("Epitaph for Geo Bogza"), first published by Nicolae Tzone in 2001. The writer was also the subject for one of B. Elvin's essays, collected as Datoria de a ezita ("The Duty to Hesitate") and first published in 2003. In the same year, his correspondence with various Transylvanian writers was published as Rânduri către tinerii scriitori ardeleni ("Letters to the Young Transylvanian Writers"). The relation between Bogza and Mircea Săucan served as the basis for a short work of fiction, which the latter authored and dictated as part of a 2007 book of interviews.

=== Other tributes ===
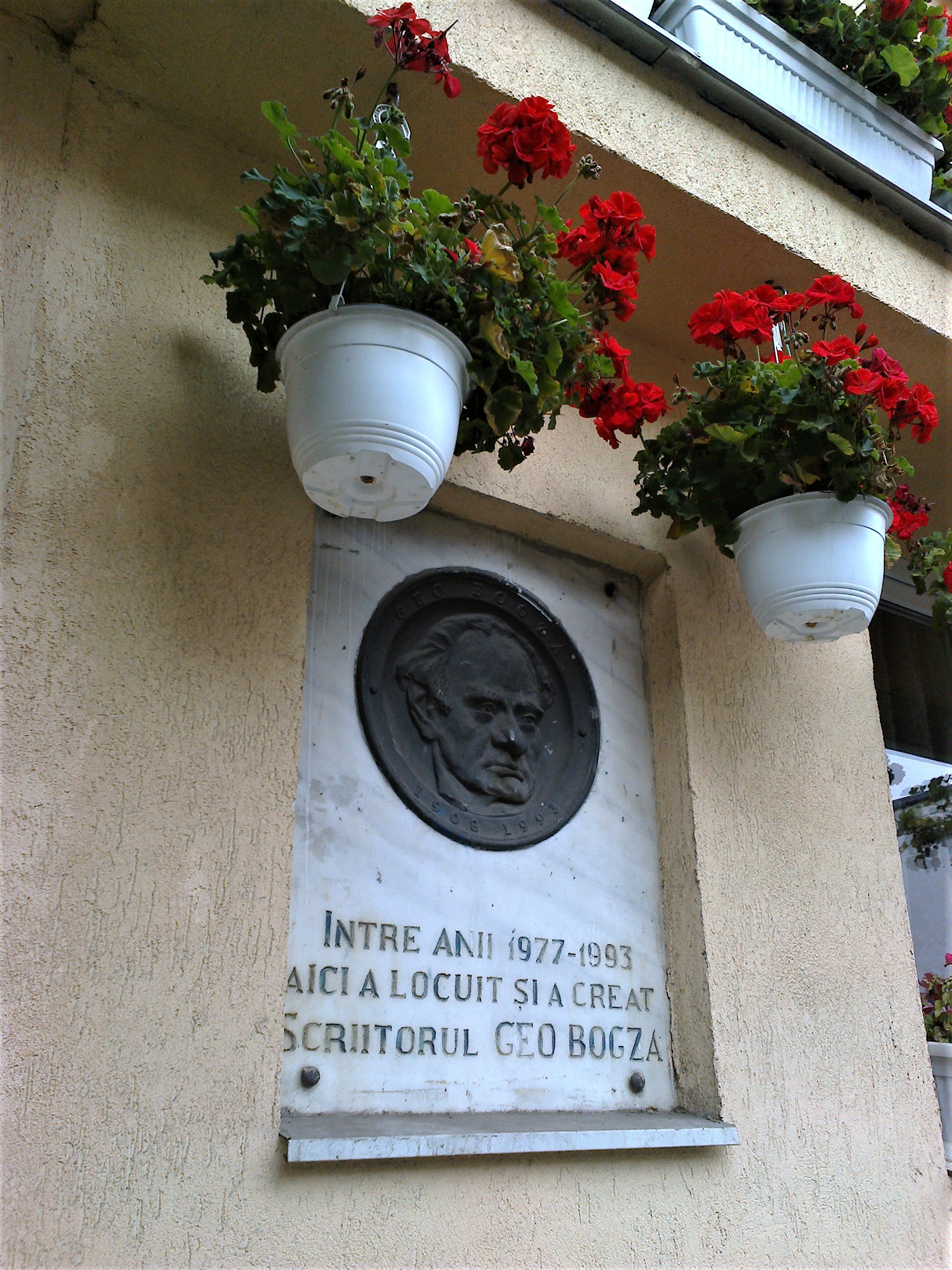
Memorial plaque in Bucharest

Bogza was the subject of a portrait painted by his friend Victor Brauner, which was itself the topic of scandal. The piece, defined by S. A. Mansbach as one of Brauner's "most fully realized Surrealist canvases of [the early 1930s]", depicted the subject nude, with a severed head and elongated sex organs (symbols which probably alluded to elements present in Bogza's own texts).

Bogza's novella, Sfârșitul lui Iacob Onisia ("The End of Iacob Onisia"), has served as the basis for a 1988 film, Iacob (translated into English as Jacob, or, in full, The Miseries of a Gold Miner – Jacob). A story of violent workers leading miserable lives and tempted to steal for their livelihood, it was adapted for the screen and directed by Mircea Danieliuc, and starred Dorel Vișan in the title role (other actors credited include Cecilia Bîrbora, Ion Fiscuteanu and Dinu Apetrei). Writing for The New York Times, American critic Vincent Canby described the production as "uncharacterized and murky". Nevertheless, Romanian critics saw Danieliuc's production as an accomplished piece of subversiveness, arguing that the director had used a Socialist realist pretext to comment on the conflict between the Ceauşescu regime and the Jiu Valley miners (see Jiu Valley miners' strike of 1977). Bogza's trial has been the subject of an episode in the series București, strict secret ("Bucharest, Top Secret"), produced by writer and political scientist Stelian Tănase and aired by Realitatea TV in 2007.

A school in Bucharest and one in Bălan were named in Bogza's honor, as were a culture house and a street in Câmpina. A memorial plaque was raised on downtown Bucharest's Știrbei Vodă Street, at a house where he lived between 1977 and 1993. Câmpina also hosts the annual Geo Bogza Theater Festival.

== Selected works ==
=== Collected poems ===
- Jurnal de sex ("Sex Diary"), 1929
- Poemul invectivă ("Offensive Poem" or "Contemptuous Poem"), 1933
- Ioana Maria: 17 poeme ("Ioana Maria: 17 Poems"), 1937
- Cântec de revoltă, de dragoste și de moarte ("Song of Revolt, Love and Death"), 1947
- Orion, 1978

=== Collected journalism ===
- Cartea Oltului ("The Book of the Olt"), 1945
- Țări de piatră, de foc, de pământ ("Lands of Stone, Fire, Earth"), 1939
- Oameni și carbuni în Valea Jiului ("Men and Coal in the Jiu Valley"), 1947
- Trei călătorii în inima țării ("Three Journeys into the Heart of the Land"), 1951
- Tablou Geografic ("Geographical Survey"), 1954
- Years of Darkness, 1955
- Meridiane sovietice ("Soviet Meridians"), 1956
- Azi, ín România: carte radiofonică de reportaj ("Today, in Romania: a Radio Reportage Book"), 1972
- Statui în lună ("Statues on the Moon"), 1977

=== Other ===
- Sfârșitul lui Iacob Onisia ("The End of Iacob Onisia"), 1949; novella
- Eu sunt ținta: Geo Bogza în dialog cu Diana Turconi ("I Am the Target: Geo Bogza Interviewed by Diana Turconi"), 1994
- Rânduri către tinerii scriitori ardeleni ("Letters to the Young Transylvanian Writers"), 2003
