= Max Blecher =

Romanian writer (1909 – 1938)

- Born: Marcel (Max) Blecher; 8 September 1909; Botoșani, Kingdom of Romania
- Died: 31 May 1938 (aged 28); Roman, Kingdom of Romania
- Occupation: Writer
- Writing career
- Period: 1930–1938
- Genres: poetry, fiction, novel, diary, memoir, letters
- Notable works: Adventures in Immediate Unreality, Scarred Hearts, Transparent Body
- Literary movement: Surrealism, Avant-Garde, Modernism

Max Blecher (8 September 1909 – 31 May 1938) was a Romanian writer.9

== Life and work ==
Max Blecher's father was a successful Jewish merchant and the owner of a porcelain shop. Blecher attended primary and secondary school in Roman. After graduating from the Roman-Vodă High School and receiving his baccalaureat, Blecher left for Paris to study medicine. Shortly thereafter, in 1928, he was diagnosed with spinal tuberculosis (Pott's disease) and forced to abandon his studies. He sought treatment at various sanatoriums: Berck-sur-Mer in France, Leysin in Switzerland, and Tekirghiol in Romania. For the remaining ten years of his life, he was confined to his bed and practically immobilized by the disease. Despite his illness, he wrote and published his first piece in 1930, a short story called "Herrant" in Tudor Arghezi's literary magazine Bilete de papagal. He contributed to André Breton's literary review Le Surréalisme au service de la révolution and carried on an intense correspondence with the foremost writers and philosophers of his day such as André Breton, André Gide, Martin Heidegger, Ilarie Voronca, Geo Bogza, Mihail Sebastian, and Sașa Pană. In 1934 he published Corp transparent, a volume of poetry.

In 1935, Blecher's parents moved him to a house on the outskirts of Roman, Neamț county where he continued to write until his death in 1938 at the age of 28. During his lifetime he published two other major works, Întâmplări în irealitate imediată (Adventures in Immediate Irreality) and Inimi cicatrizate (Scarred Hearts), as well as a number of short prose pieces, articles and translations. Vizuina luminată: Jurnal de sanatoriu (The Lit-Up Burrow: Sanatorium Journal) was published posthumously in part in 1947 and in full in 1971.

== Major works ==
- Corp transparent (Transparent Body)
- Întâmplări din irealitatea imediată (Adventures in Immediate Unreality)
- Inimi cicatrizate (Scarred Hearts)
- Vizuina luminată: Jurnal de sanatoriu (The Lit-Up Burrow: Sanatorium Journal)

== Translations ==
Max Blecher's books have been translated into English, Esperanto, Estonian, French, German, Spanish, Turkish, Czech, Portuguese, Hungarian, Dutch, Danish, Swedish, Italian, Polish, Catalan and Greek. The German translation of Inimi cicatrizate, Vernarbte Herzen in German, was number one on Die Zeit's list of Notable Books.

=== English translations ===
- Adventures in Immediate Unreality, Jeanie Han (trans.) (2007) A free download of the translation is available at maxblecher.wordpress.com or at https://archive.org/details/AdventuresInImmediateUnreality
- Occurrence in the Immediate Unreality, Alistair Ian Blyth (trans.), University of Plymouth Press (2009) ISBN 978-1-84102-207-9
- Scarred Hearts, Henry Howard (trans.) London: Old Street Publishing (2008) ISBN 978-1-905847-18-1
- Adventures in Immediate Irreality, newly translated into English by Michael Henry Heim. New Directions, February, 2015. ISBN 9780811217606
- Something is still present and isn't, of what's gone. A bilingual anthology of avant-garde and avant-garde inspired Rumanian poetry, Victor Pambuccian (trans.) Rome: Aracne editrice (2018) ISBN 978-88-255-1473-5
- The Illuminated Burrow: A Sanatorium Journal, Gabi Reigh (trans.), introduction by Gabriela Glăvan, artwork by the author, Twisted Spoon Press (2022). ISBN 9788086264585
- The Lighted Burrow - A Sanatorium Journal, Christina Tudor-Sideri (trans.) Sublunary Editions (2022)

=== Notable translations in other languages ===
- Accadimenti nell'irrealtà immediata, Bruno Mazzoni (trans.), Rovereto: Keller editore (2012) ISBN 978-88-89767-32-0
- Aus der unmittelbaren Unwirklichkeit, Ernest Wichner (trans.), Frankfurt: Suhrkamp Verlag (2003) ISBN 978-3-518-22367-3
- Aventures dans l'irréalité immédiate, Marianne Sora (trans.), Paris: Editions Denoel (1972)
- Vernarbte Herzen, Ernest Wichner (trans.), Frankfurt: Suhrkamp Verlag (2006) ISBN 978-3-518-22399-4
- Acontecimientos de la Irrealidad Inmediata; la Guarida Iluminada: Diario de Sanatorio, Joaquín Garrigós (trans.), Valencia: Aletheia (2007) ISBN 978-84-932877-4-0
- Cuerpo transparente, Joaquín Garrigós (trans.), Barcelona: Rosa Cúbica (2008) ISBN 978-84-88927-21-7
- Corazones cicatrizados, Joaquín Garrigós (trans.), Valencia: Pre-Textos (2009) ISBN 978-84-81919-80-6
- Corpo transparente/Corp transparent, Fernando Klabin (trans.), (n.t.) Revista Literária em Tradução, nº 1 (set/2010), Fpolis/Brasil, ISSN 2177-5141
- Cœurs cicatrisés, Gabrielle Danoux (trans.), Kingersheim (2014), ISBN 978-1499207514
- Corps transparent, Gabrielle Danoux (trans.), Kingersheim (2017)
- Corpi cicatrizzati, Bruno Mazzoni (trans.), Keller editore, Rovereto, (novembre 2017), ISBN 978-88-99911-18-8
- Verkaro (preskaŭ) kompleta, Tomasz Chmielik, Ionel Oneţ (trans.), Ars Libri, Lublin (2018). ISBN 978-83-63698-31-7. The most complete volume in any language other than Romanian.
- Händelser ur den omedelbara overkligheten, Inger Johansson (trans.), h:ström Text & kultur, Umeå (2010).
- Upplyst gryt, Inger Johansson (trans.), h:ström Text & kultur, Umeå (2021).
- Esdeveniments en la irrealitat immediata, Jana Balacciu Matei (trans.), Martorell: Adesiara Editorial (2025) ISBN 978-84-19908-27-8.
