= Brătești =

Brăteşti may refer to several places in Romania:

- Brăteşti, a village in Albeştii de Argeş Commune, Argeș County
- Brăteşti, a village in Bârsănești Commune, Bacău County
- Brăteşti, a village in Răbăgani Commune, Bihor County
- Brăteşti, a village in Căpreni Commune, Gorj County
- Brăteşti, a village in Stolniceni-Prăjescu Commune, Iaşi County
- Brăteşti, a village in Șirna Commune, Prahova County
- Brăteşti, a village in Poeni Commune, Teleorman County
- Brăteşti, the former name of Ion Creangă Commune, Neamţ County
- Brăteștii de Jos, a village in Văcărești Commune, Dâmbovița County

== See also ==
- Bratu (surname)
- Bratia (disambiguation)
- Brăteni (disambiguation)
