= Bratu =

Bratu is a Romanian surname that may refer to:

- Aurel Bratu
- Cristian Bratu
- Doru Bratu
- Emilian Bratu
- Florin Bratu
- Ilie Bratu
- Traian Bratu

== See also ==
- Bratu River
- Bratu 220, a Franco-Romanian prototype three-engined airliner of the 1930s, built in France
- Bratia (disambiguation)
- Brăteni (disambiguation)
- Brătești (disambiguation)
- Brateș, the name of two villages in Romania
- Brateiu, a commune in Romania

Family names:

- Brătianu family
- Brătescu
