= Romanian literature =

Romanian literature (Romanian: Literatura română) is the entirety of literature written by Romanian authors, although the term may also be used to refer to all literature written in the Romanian language or by any authors native to Romania.

Early Romanian literature includes religious texts and historical chronicles written in Old Church Slavonic. Romanian literature throughout history has been influenced both by international European movements, such as Humanism and Enlightenment, and by the local geopolitical context and major national events such as the Unification of Moldavia and Wallachia and the Union of Transylvania with Romania. In addition to literature created by individual authors, Romania also has a rich tradition of folk literature which is part of the Romanian folklore. In 2009, the Nobel Prize for Literature was awarded to Herta Müller.

Romanian literature achieved its golden age during the interwar period, and several authors of the 20th century, gained international recognition, such as Mircea Eliade and Emil Cioran.

During the communist era, literature as well as most other aspects of life, were subjected to control and censorship by the state authorities. Nevertheless, during the same period many classical Romanian literary works were adapted into films and television series by the Romanian cinema and the Romanian television, as part of the nationalist desire of the communist party to promote Romanian culture.

== Old Romanian literature ==
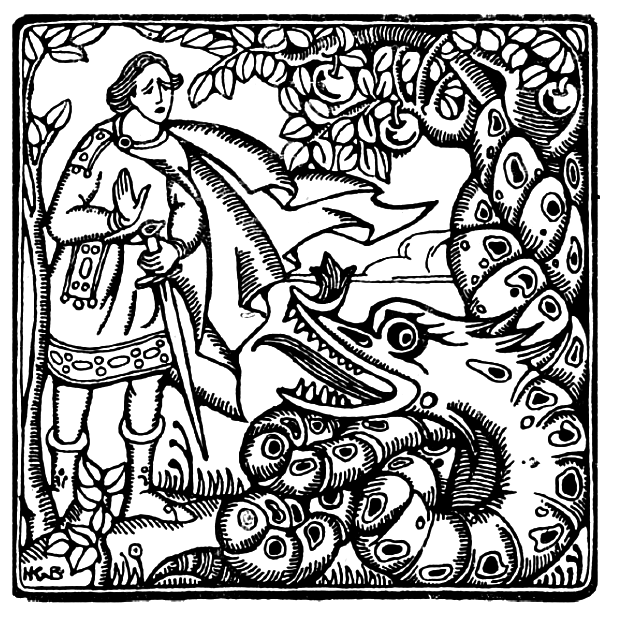
Făt-Frumos and Zmeul, 1927 art by Nadia Bulighin, depicting characters of Romanian folk fairy tales

The development of Romanian literature has taken place in parallel with that of the rich Romanian folklore – lyric, epic, dramatic and didactic – which continues in modern times. Romanian oral literature includes doine (lyric songs), balade (ballads), hore (dance songs), colinde (carols), basme (fairy tales), snoave (anecdotes), vorbe (proverbs), and ghicitori (riddles). The folk pastoral ballad Miorița is one of the best known examples of Romanian folk literature. Folk literature has been transcribed by authors, notably Petre Ispirescu, who collected folk tales.

=== Medieval Slavonic literature ===
The script of Old Church Slavonic began to be used in the territories of current day Romania as early as the 10th century, with the oldest surviving manuscripts being dated as far back as the 12th century. The earliest dated texts in Slavonic, originally from Wallachia and Moldavia, consist of a series of religious songs by Nicodim and Filotei and a hagiographical text by Grigore Țamblac, all being dated between 1385 and 1391. Also by the 15th century many copies of medieval Slavonic texts have been created by the scribes of the Danubian Principalities.

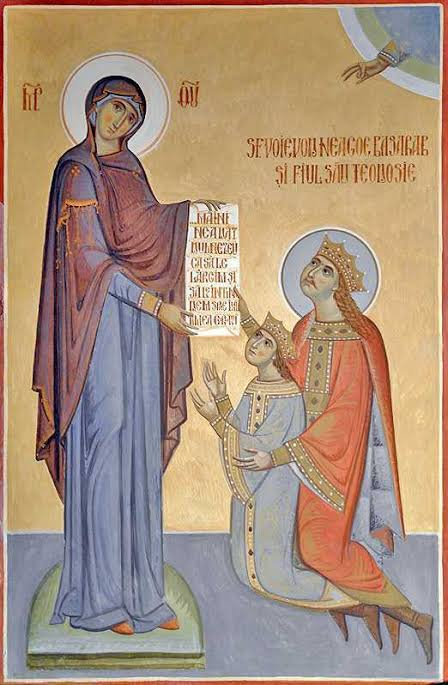
Icon of Neagoe Basarab and his son Teodosie

In the meantime numerous Slavonic and Greek translations of popular medieval romances were in circulation across the Danubian Principalities, like the Alexander Romance and Barlaam and Josaphat.

Particularly of note is The Teachings of Neagoe Basarab to his son Theodosie: a series of teachings on morality and politics, written between 1519 and 1521, by the Wallachian Lord Neagoe Basarab, a work written in the spirit of the Renaissance and considered one of the oldest great works of Southeastern European literature.

Moldavian historical chronicles written by court order in the 16th century include the chronicles of Macarie, Azarie and Eftimie.

=== Beginning of writing and publishing in Romanian ===
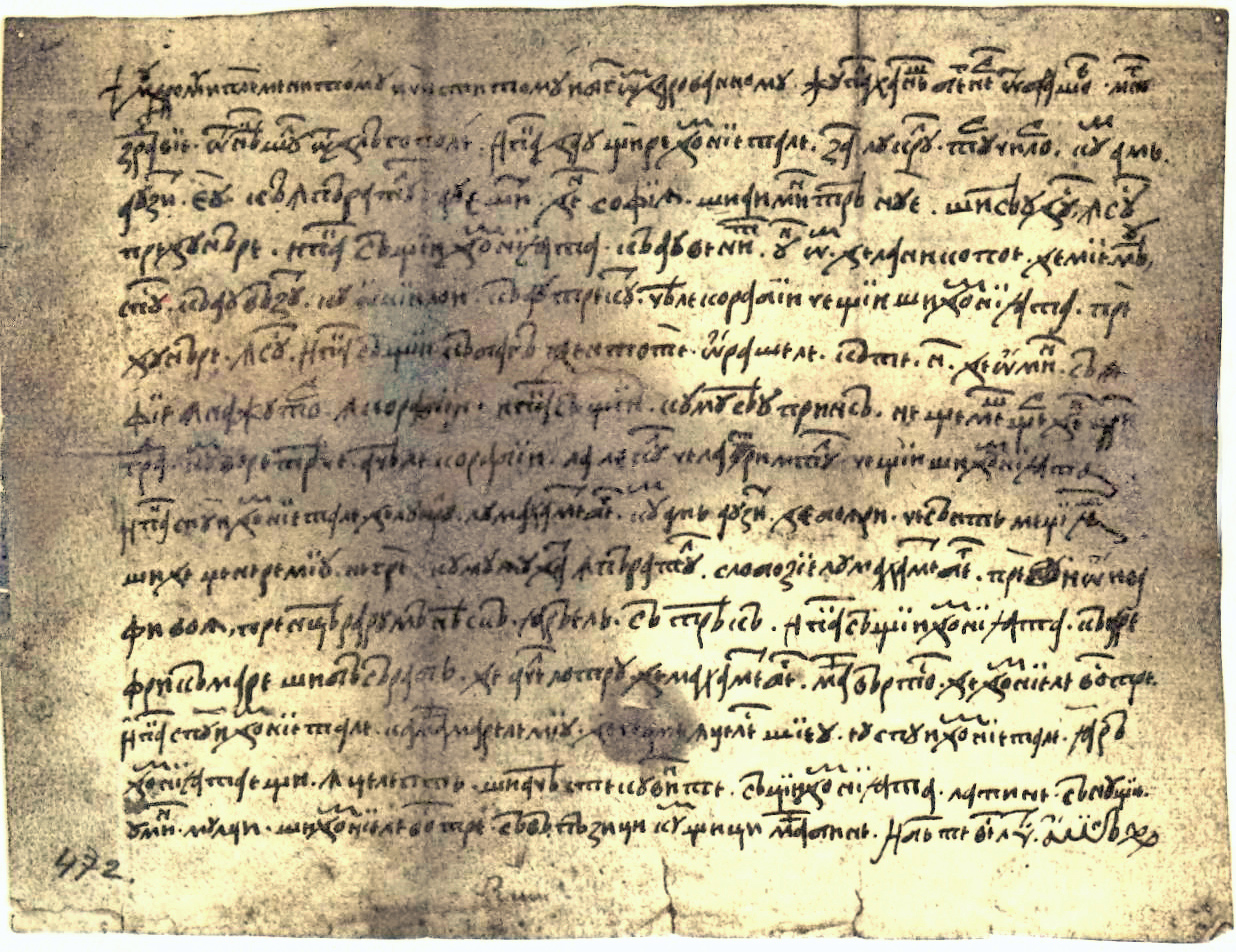
Neacșu's letter

The earliest books in Romanian were translated from Slavonic religious texts in the 15th century. Psaltirea Hurmuzaki, Codicele Voronețean, Psaltirea Voronețeană, Psaltirea Scheiană, and others are religious texts from Moldavia that carry evidence of being translations of manuscripts written in the other languages in the Banat-Hunedoara area. Of them, Hurmuzaki Psalter, a Romanian copy of a bilingual Church Slavonic - Romanian Psalter, has been dated between 1491–1504 by watermarks, making it the oldest preserved manuscript in Romanian.

The earliest surviving document in Romanian that can be precisely dated is Neacșu's letter written in 1521, to the jude ("judge and mayor") of Brașov, Hans Benkner.

The first book printed in Wallachia was a Slavonic religious book, printed in 1508 at Târgoviște. The first book printed in the Romanian language was Catehismul românesc by Filip Moldoveanul in 1544. Other translations from Greek and Slavonic books were printed later in the 16th century. Dosoftei, a Moldavian Bishop, in 1673, published the first Romanian metrical psalter, the earliest collection of poems written in Romanian.

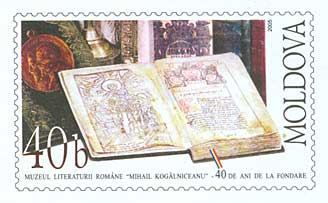
Stamp with the Romanian Literature Museum in Chișinău

Early efforts to publish the Bible in Romanian started with the 1582 printing in the small town of Orăștie of the so-called Palia de la Orăștie – a translation of the first books of the Old Testament – printed by Deacon Șerban (the son of Deacon Coresi) and Marien Diacul (Marien the Scribe). Palia was translated by Bishop Mihail Tordaș et al. from the Pentateuch printed at Kolozsvár in 1551 by Gáspár Heltai and a version of Vulgate.

The entire Bible was not published in Romanian until the end of the 17th century, when the Metropolitanate's Press of Bucharest printed Biblia de la București ("The Bucharest Bible") in 1688, compiled by the Greceanu Brothers.

In Transylvania, there was also an attestation of the explicit use of a Latin model, with the appearance of the first Romanian dictionary, Dictionarium Valachico-Latinum (Caransebeș, about 1650), while the first grammar of the Romanian language written in Latin was Institutiones linguae Valachicae (Crișana, circa 1770).

=== Humanism ===
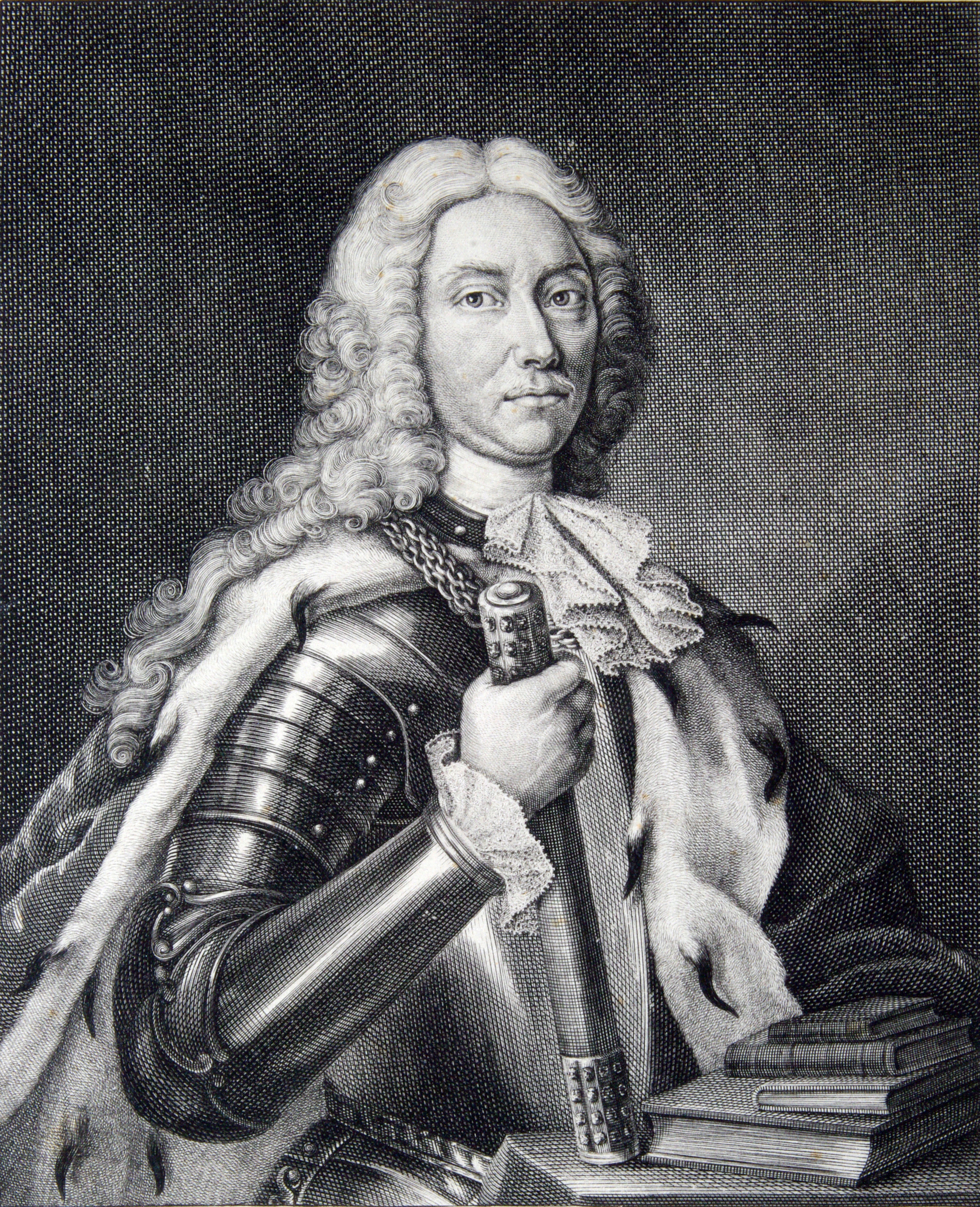
Dimitrie Cantemir

The first appearances of humanism in Moldavia and Wallachia were in the 16th century with the likes of Luca Stroici and Petru Cercel, but it took another century for these ideas to fully flourish. This delay can be attributed to the continuation of Byzantine culture in the Danubian Principalities, or to the different social classes compared to Western Europe.

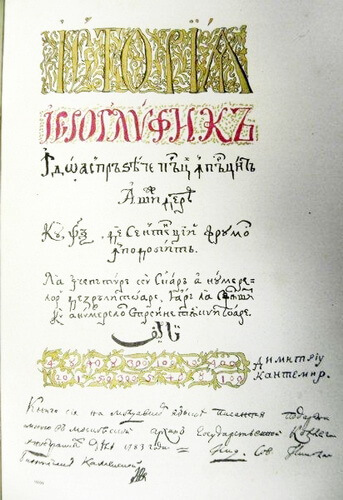
Original Manuscript of Hieroglyphic History by Dimitrie Cantemir

During the 17th century, humanism spread to Moldavia via Poland and its Jesuit schools, having as representatives the likes of Grigore Ureche, Miron Costin, and Ion Neculce with their chronicles on the history of Moldavia. Following the example of Petro Movilă's Kyiv Colegium, the Lords Matei Basarab and Vasile Lupu established Neoclassical schools such as the Schola Graeca et Latina and the Iași Colegiu. In Wallachia, Mihail Moxa, Kyr Gavriil and Stoica Ludescu wrote historical chronicles; while the Cronica Buzeștilor (The Chronicle of the Buzești House) was written by an anonymous writer.

Constantin Cantacuzino was a nobleman and historian and a notable humanist scholar. Nicolae Milescu was a Moldavian-born writer, diplomat and traveler, who lived and worked in the Tsardom of Russia.

The most significant Romanian humanist was Dimitrie Cantemir, who wrote histories of Wallachia, Moldavia and the Ottoman Empire, and philosophical and religious treaties such as The Divan, The Indescribable Image of Sacred Science, and The Little Compendium of Logic. He also wrote the Roman à clef A Hieroglyphic History in 1705.

=== Enlightenment ===
In 18th century Transylvania, throughout the Blaj Schools of Inocențiu Micu-Klein, a Latinist and Enlightenment movement, the Școala Ardeleană emerged, producing philological studies of the Romantic origin of the Romanian language. Among the many works on Romanian history and the Romanian language by Samuil Micu-Klein, Gheorghe Șincai and Petru Maior, the "Heroic-comic-satiric Poem" Țiganiada by Ion Budai-Deleanu, can also be found, promoting democratic and enlightenment ideals.

In Wallachia and Moldavia, the Enlightenment can be seen in the Poems and Prose of Iancu Văcărescu, Costache Conachi, and Dinicu Golescu.

== National awakening ==
In 1829, in Wallachia, Ion Heliade Rădulescu founded the first Romanian-language Newspaper, Curierul Românesc, and cofounded the Philharmonic Society which later created the National Theatre of Bucharest. Albina Românească, a similar publication to Curierul Românesc was started contemporaneously by Gheorghe Asachi in Moldavia.

=== Pașoptism ===
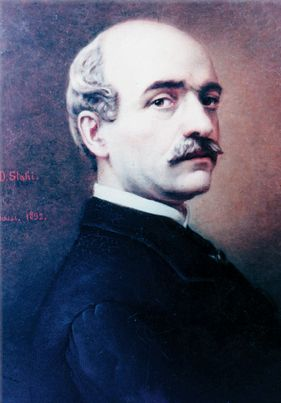
Vasile Alecsandri

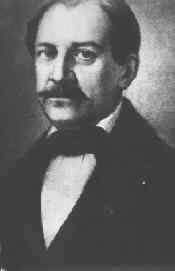
Constantin Negruzzi

In the 1800s, the revolutionary ideas of nationalism spreading in Europe were also circulating among Romanians who desired national independence from the Ottoman Empire. These nationalistic attitudes led to the revolutions of 1821 and 1848. These ideas were mainly propagated by Mihail Kogălniceanu's publication Dacia Literară which was adapting French Romanticism to Romanian writing with the purpose of creating an original national literature.

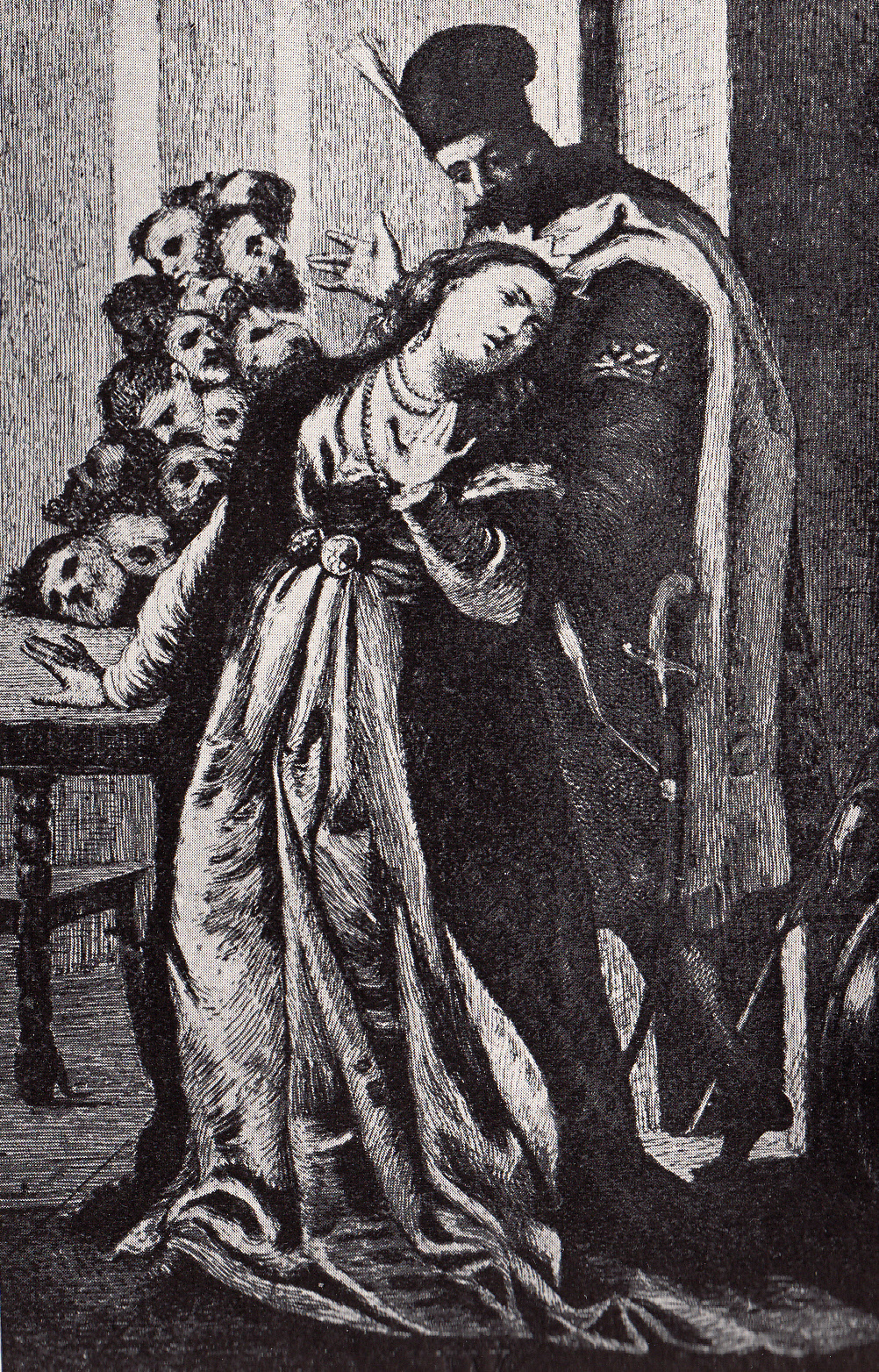
Theodor Aman illustration of Alexandru Lăpușneanul

The works of these writers, later dubbed Pașoptists (after the Revolution of 1848), have been shown not only to contain Romantic but also Neoclassical and Realist traits. Vasile Alecsandri was a prolific writer, contributing to Romanian literature with poetry, prose, the Chirița plays (1850–1875), historical dramas such as Despot Vodă (1879), and collections of Romanian folklore. Also, taking inspiration from history, Constantin Negruzzi wrote the novella Alexandru Lăpușneanul (1840). Other Pașoptist writers include Vasile Cârlova, Grigore Alexandrescu, Anton Pann, and Alecu Donici.

=== Junimea ===
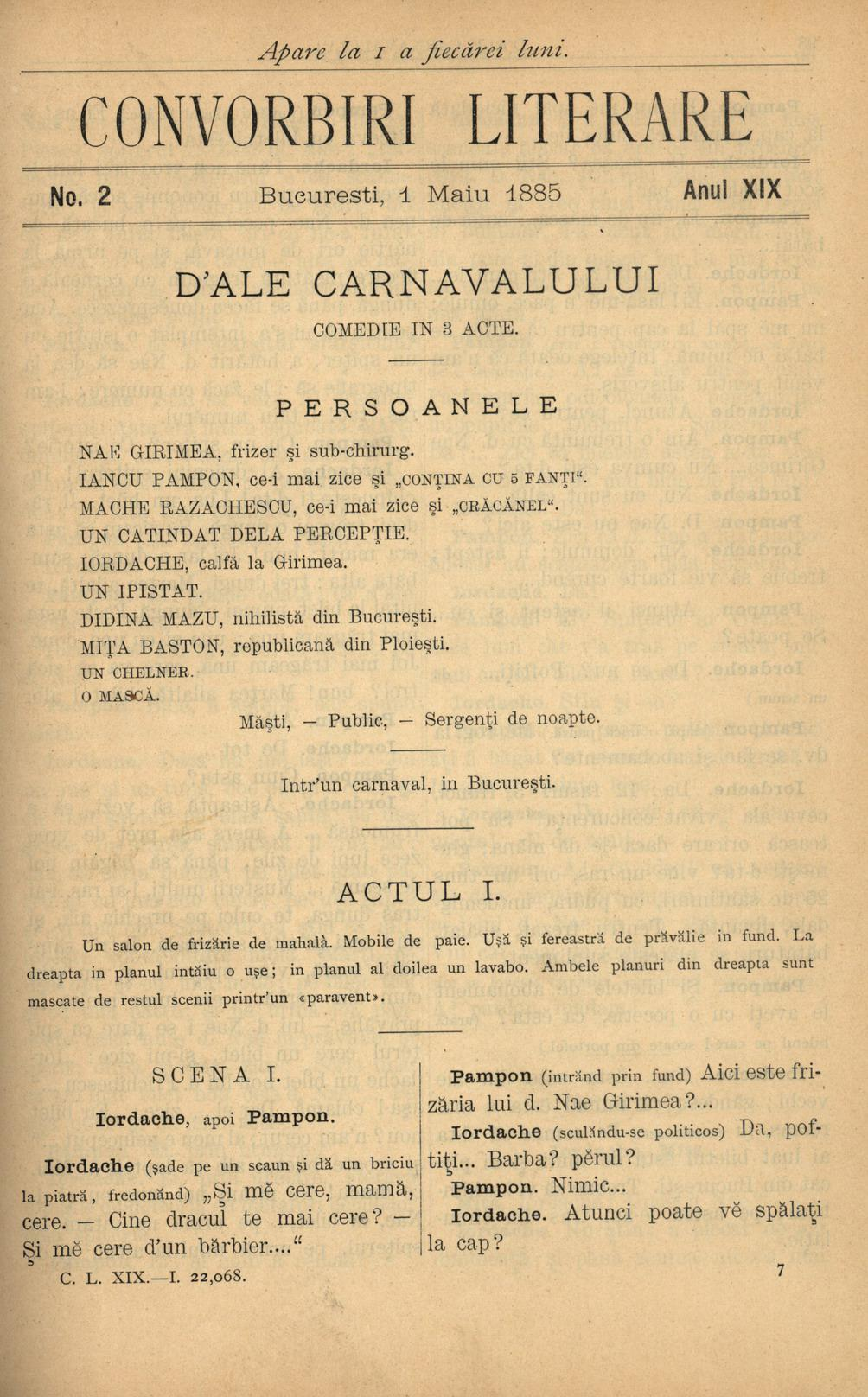
First Page of Convorbiri Literare 1 May 1885

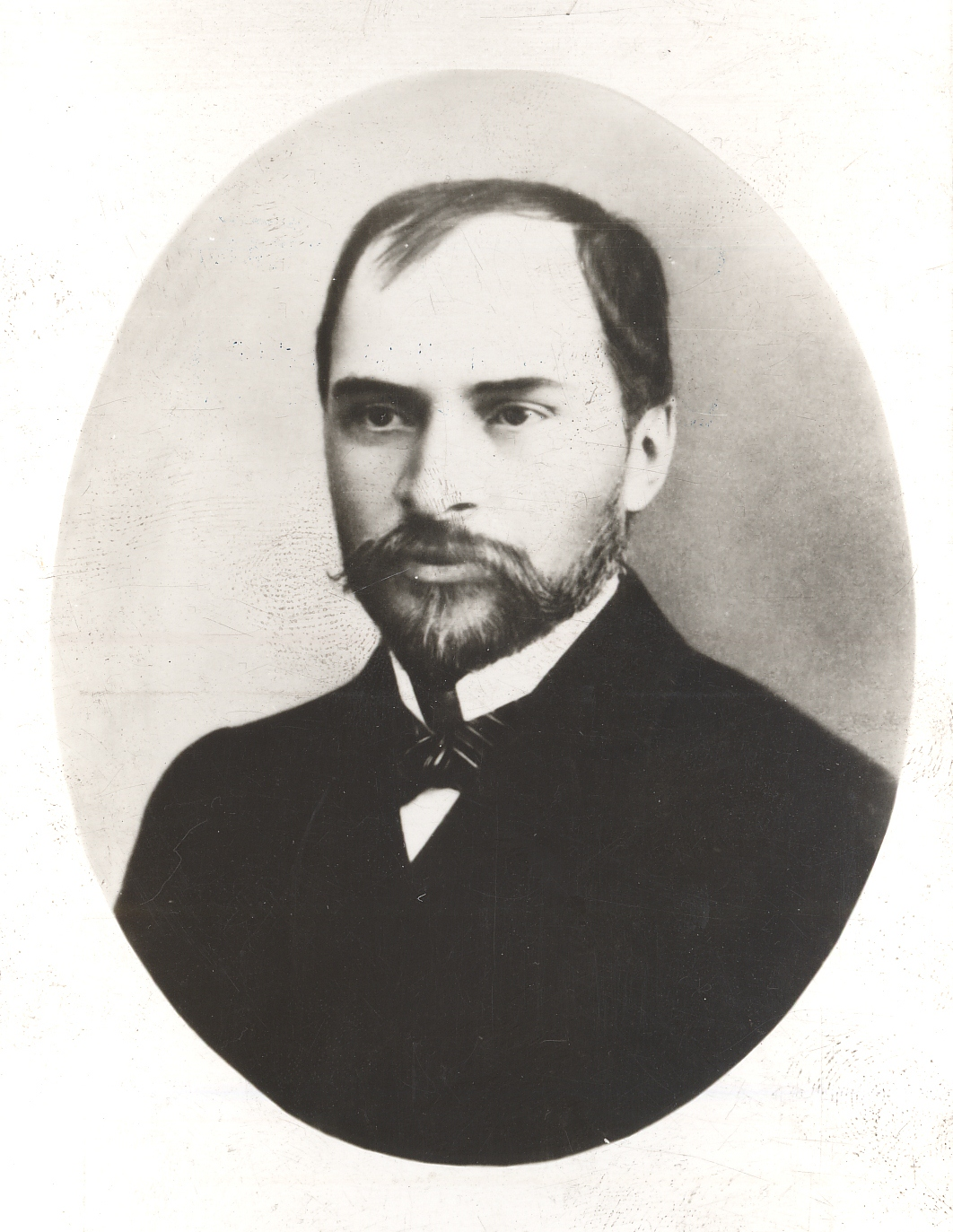
George Coșbuc

The literary circle Junimea, founded in Iași in 1863 by Titu Maiorescu, Petre P. Carp, Vasile Pogor, Theodor Rosetti and Iacob Negruzzi began publishing the magazine Convorbiri Literare in1867, which eventually became the most important Romanian language literary publication in the 2nd half of the 19th century and 1st half of the 20th century. Through his links with Junimea, literary critic Titu Maiorescu set the direction of synchronizing Romanian literature both with other European literary movements and with Romanian folklore.

Many outstanding Romanian writers, including George Coșbuc and Barbu Ştefănescu Delavrancea, published their works in Convorbiri Literare.

Other notable authors of this era are Nicolae Bălcescu, Dimitrie Bolintineanu, Alecu Russo, Nicolae Filimon, Bogdan Petriceicu Hasdeu, Alexandru Odobescu, Grigore Alexandrescu and Petre Ispirescu.

=== The beginnings of the Romanian novel ===
The first Romanian novel is considered to be Manoil (published in 1855) by Dimitrie Bolintineanu (if one excludes from the definition of novel the allegorical literary work Istoria ieroglifică by Dimitrie Cantemir, which was written between 1703 – 1705). Bolintineanu also published the novel Elena (1862). However these two novels are largely forgotten, although they are considered relevant from the point of view of describing Romanian society in the mid-19th century. Nicolae Filimon is considered the father of the Romanian novel, having written the influential novel Ciocoii vechi și noi (1863).

=== The great classics ===
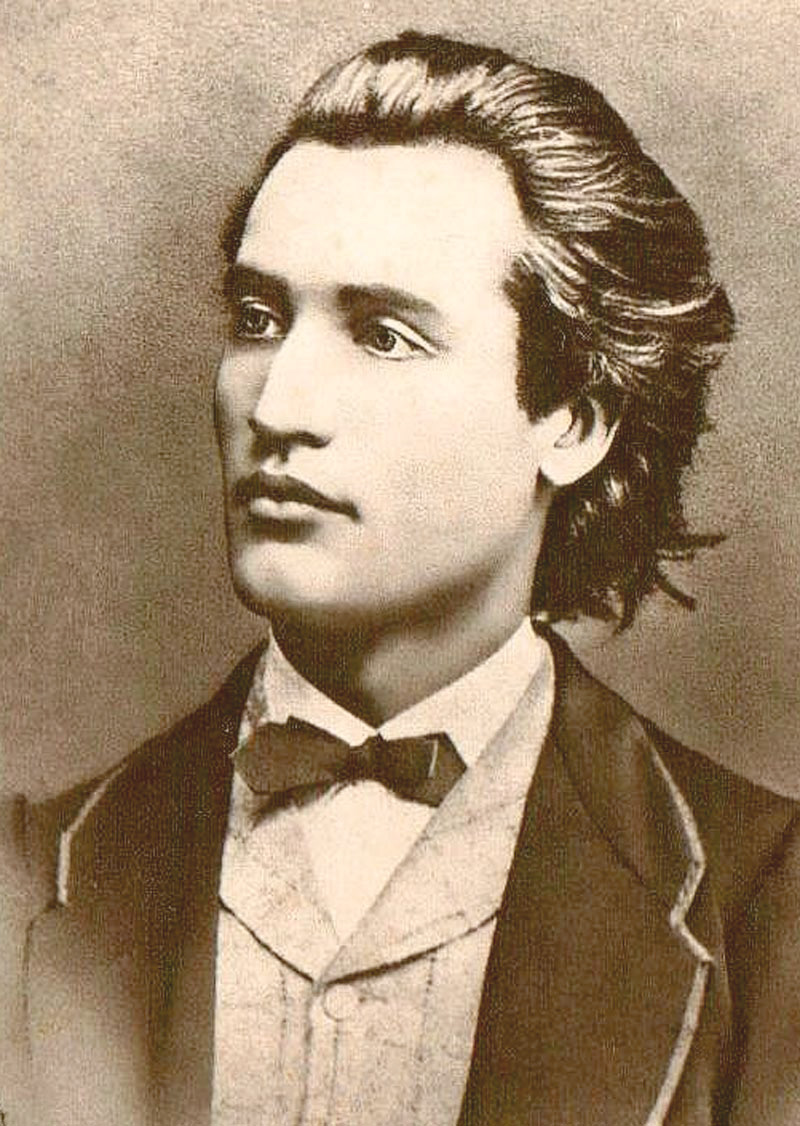
Mihai Eminescu

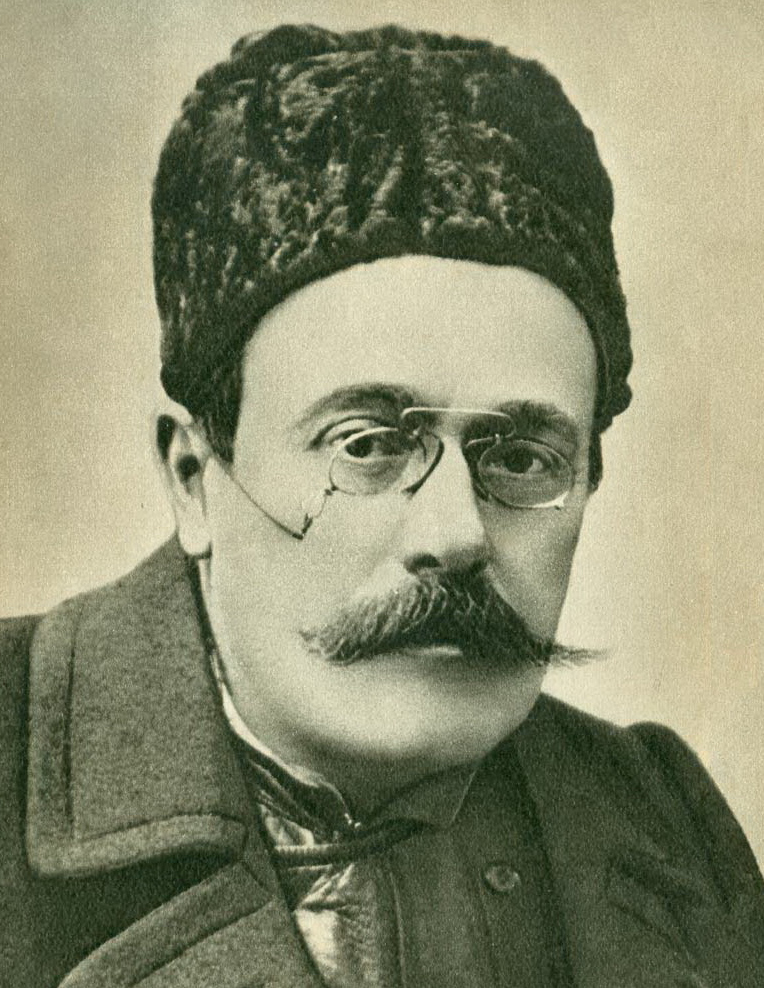
Ion Luca Caragiale

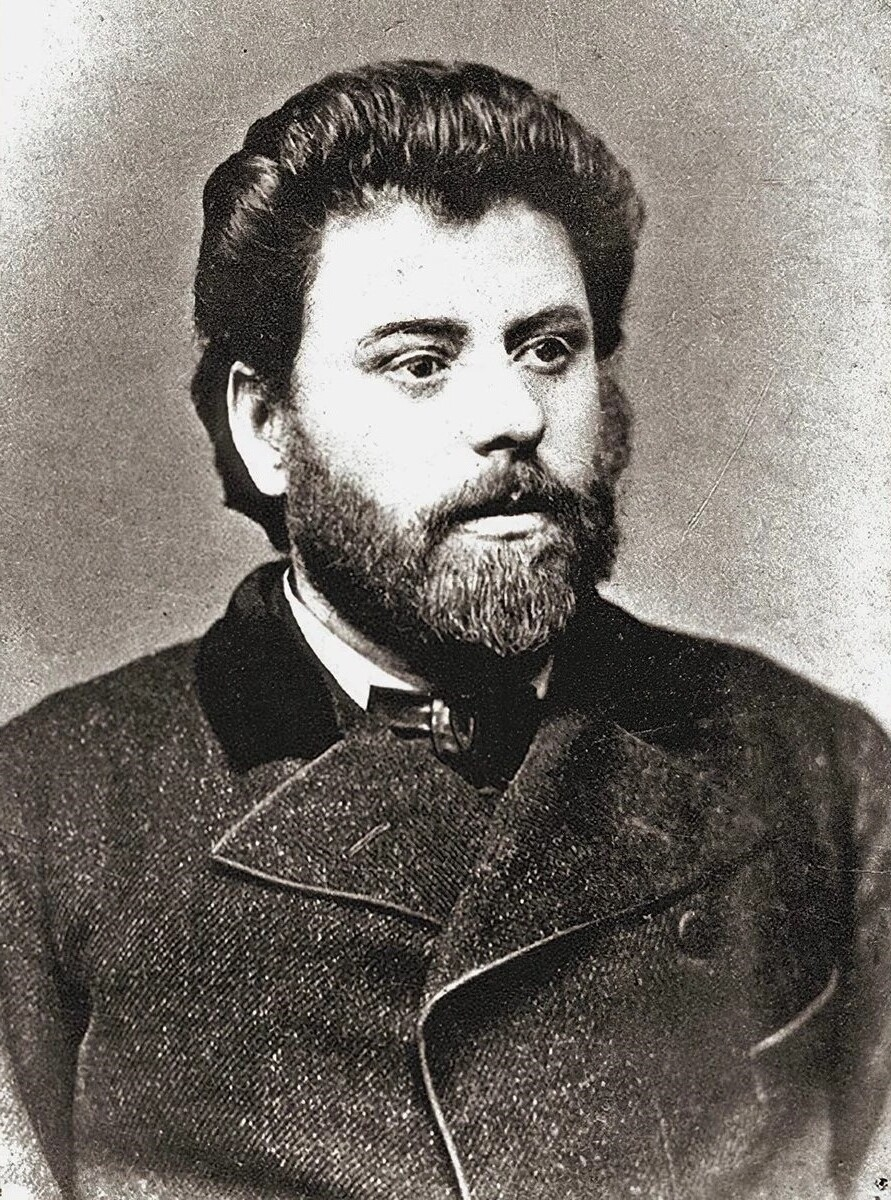
Ion Creangă

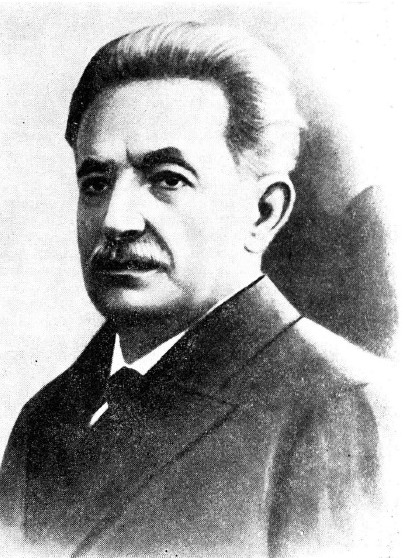
Ioan Slavici

Among the many writers of Junimea, four are considered to be the Great Classics of Romanian Literature: the poet Mihai Eminescu, the satirist Ion Luca Caragiale, Ioan Slavici, and Ion Creangă.

Mihai Eminescu is considered by many critics to be the most important and influential Romanian poet. His lyrical poetry has its roots in Romanian folklore intertwined with Kantian and Schopenhauer's philosophy and Buddhist cosmology. Among his greatest poems are the romantic poems Floare Albastră (1872) and Luceafărul, as well as the series of five philosophical poems called Letters (1881–1890).

Ioan Slavici is one of the best known Romanian novella writers. His works can be categorized as Realist Bildungsromans. They are mainly set in Transylvania and have Moralistic psychological undertones. His most famous works are the novellas Moara cu noroc and Popa Tanda, and the novel Mara.

Ion Luca Caragiale, wrote some of the best Romanian comedies, sketches and farces. Among his best known plays are O Noapte Furtunoasă (1879), O Scrisoare Pierdută (1884), and D-ale Carnavalului (1885).

Ion Creangă wrote personalized retellings of folkloric tales, of which some of the best known are Povestea lui Harap Alb (1877), Păcală (1880), and Făt-Frumos fiul Iepei (1877). Of further note are his autobiographical memoirs from Amintiri din copilarie.

=== Sămănătorism and Poporanism ===
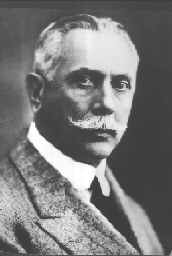
Duiliu Zamfirescu

From 1901 to 1910, through the activity of the publication Sămănătorul, founded by George Coșbuc and Alexandru Vlahuță, and later under the editorial watch of historian Nicolae Iorga, a new literary movement formed. A movement concentrated on preserving traditional values and idealising rural life, a continuation Eminescu's Romanticism.

Among Sămănătorul's authors were George Coșbuc a poet, translator, teacher, and journalist, best known for his verses describing, praising and eulogizing rural life, author of Pașa Hasan, Nunta Zamfirei and Moartea lui Fulger; but also Alexandru Vlahuță, Octavian Goga, Duiliu Zamfirescu, Ștefan O. Iosif, Barbu Ștefănescu Delavrancea, Ion Agârbiceanu and Alexandru Macedonski. Although Goga and Agârbiceanu have become later associated with Poporanism and the publication, Viața Românească.

== Interbellum literature ==
After achieving national unity in 1918, Romanian literature entered what can be called a golden age, characterized by two opposite literary movements, Traditionalism and Modernism, and by the development of the Romanian novel. The interwar period of Romanian literature was a very rich and creative time, with numerous literary works being published during that period, addressing a variety of themes, including historical novels, novels depicting rural life, war, romantic love, social class and existential themes .

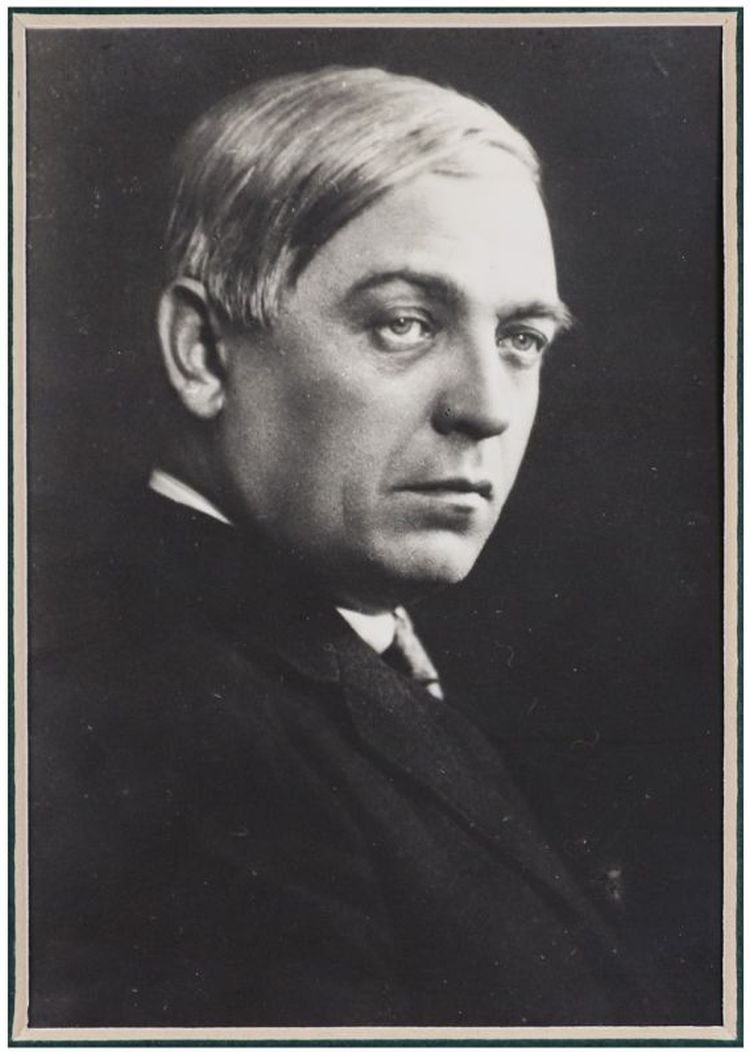
Liviu Rebreanu

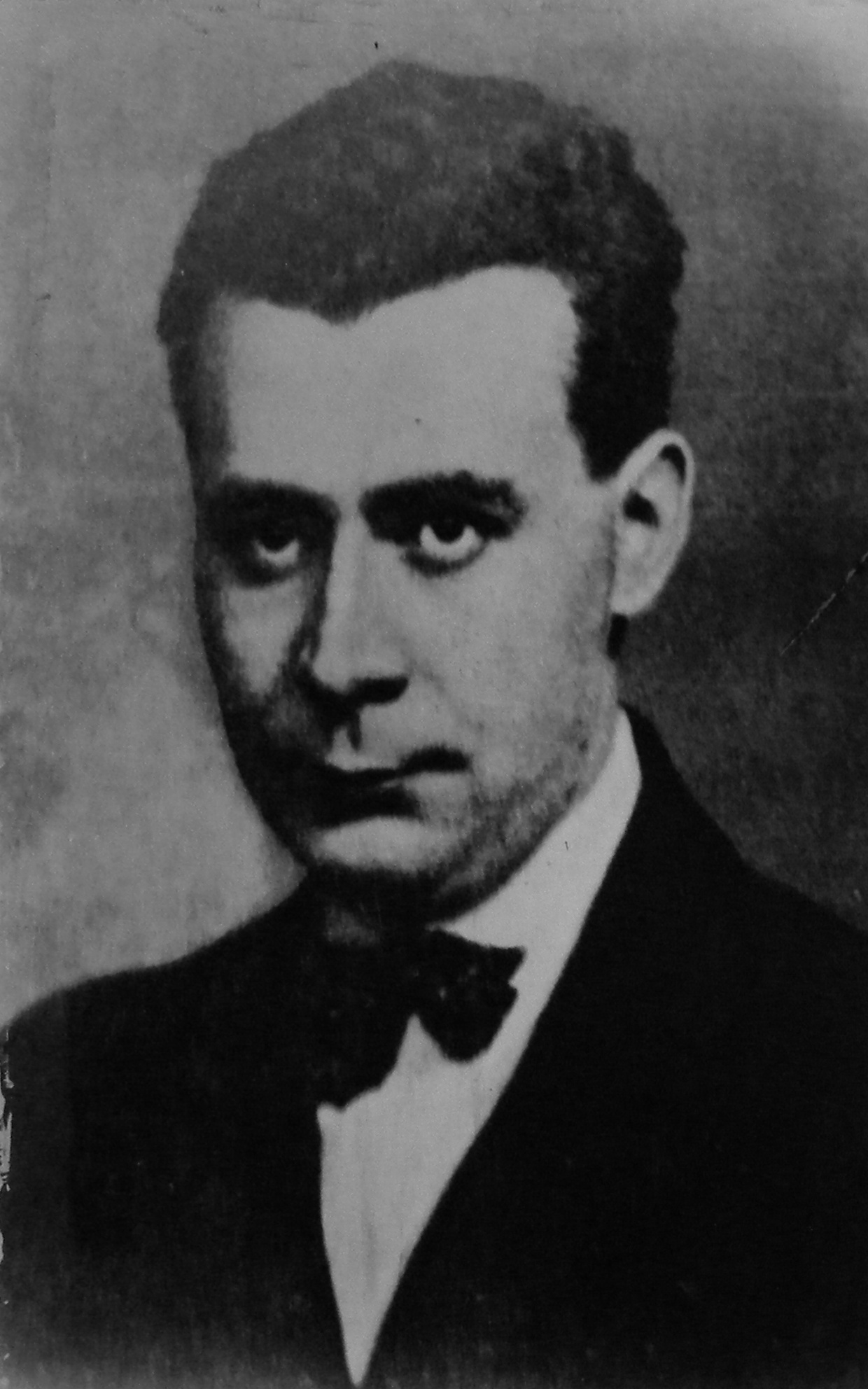
Lucian Blaga

Traditional society and recent political events influenced works such as Liviu Rebreanu's Răscoala ("The Uprising", 1932), which was inspired by the 1907 Romanian Peasants' Revolt, and Pădurea Spânzuraților ("Forest of the Hanged"), published in 1922 and inspired by Romanian participation in World War I. Rebreanu's novel Ion, published in 1920, presents the life of peasants and intellectuals in early twentieth century Transylvania, and is said to be the most read Romanian novel. The dawn of the modern novel can be seen in Hortensia Papadat-Bengescu's Concert din muzică de Bach ("A Bach Concert"), Camil Petrescu's Ultima noapte de dragoste, întâia noapte de război ("The Last Night of Love, the First Night of War") and Mateiu Caragiale’s Craii de Curtea-Veche ("The Rakes of Old Court"). George Călinescu is another complex personality of Romanian literature: novelist, playwright, poet, literary critic and historian, essayist, journalist. He published authoritative monographs about Eminescu and Creangă, and a monumental (almost 1,000 pages in quarto) history of Romanian literature from its origin to the time of his writing (1941). He is also the author of the novel Enigma Otliei ("The Enigma of Otilia").

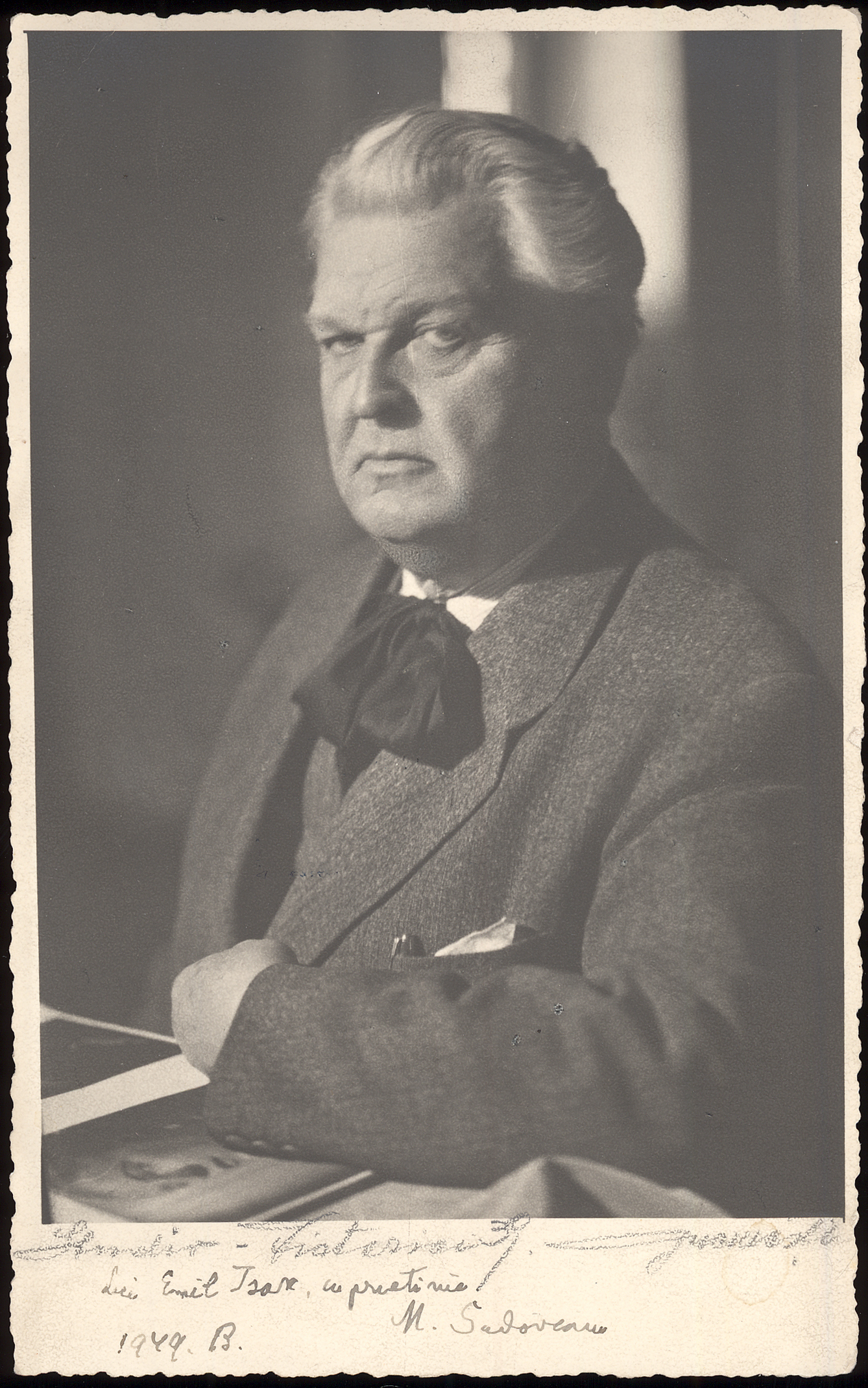
Mihail Sadoveanu

An important realist writer was Mihail Sadoveanu, who wrote mainly novels which took place at various times in the history of Moldova. But probably the most important writers were Tudor Arghezi, Lucian Blaga, and Mircea Eliade. Arghezi revolutionized Romanian poetry 50 years after Eminescu, creating new pillars for the modern Romanian poem. Blaga, one of the country's most important artistic personalities, developed through his writings a complex system of philosophy, still not perfectly understood today. Eliade is today considered the greatest historian in the field of religions. His novels reveal a mystical, pre-Christian symbolism paving the way for contemporary Romanian art.

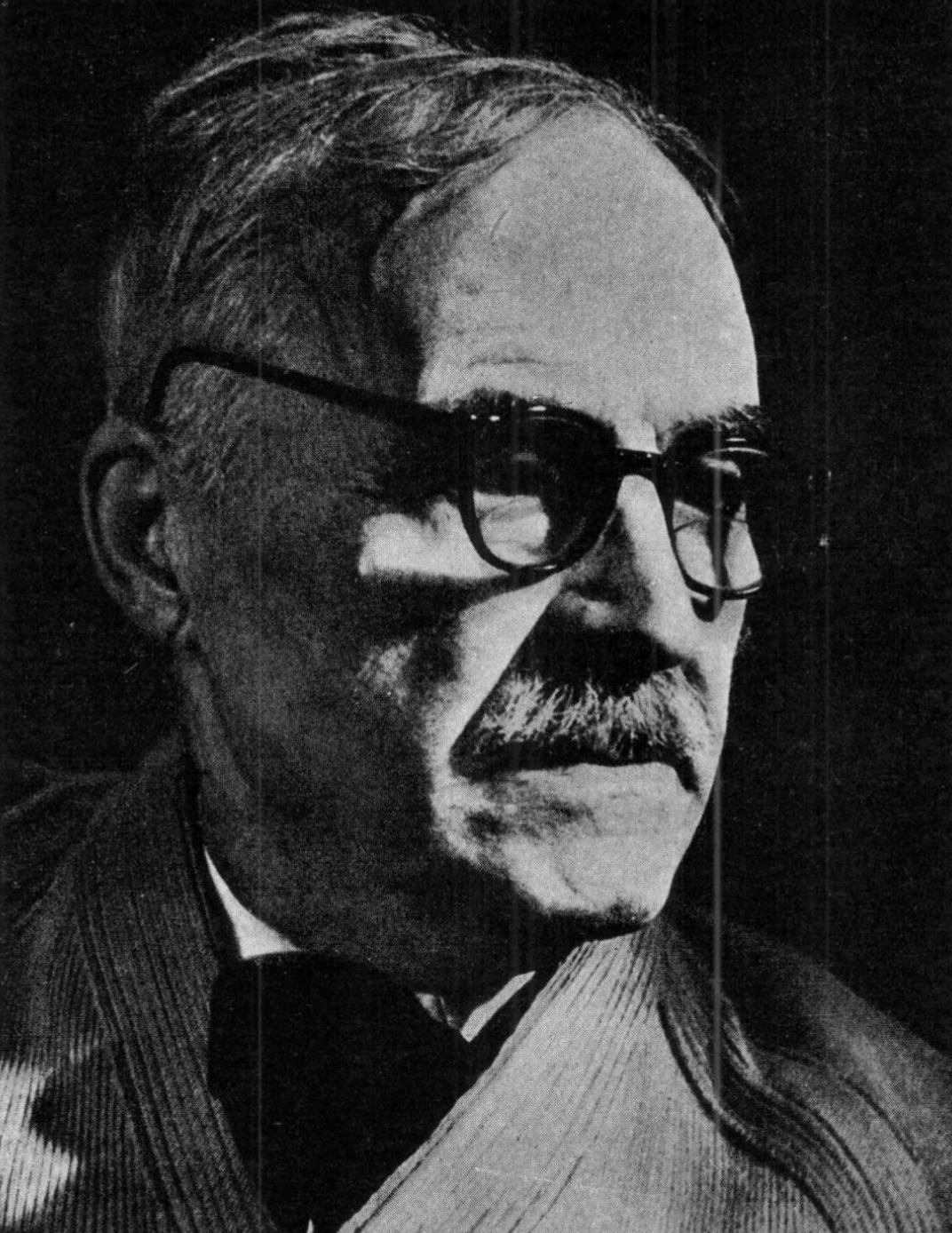
Tudor Arghezi

Born in Romania, Tristan Tzara, a poet and essayist, is the main founder of Dada, a nihilistic revolutionary movement in the arts, and may have been responsible for its name (Romanian for "Yes yes"). Later he abandoned nihilism for Surrealism and Marxism. For the first time in its history, Romanian culture was fully connected to Western culture, while Dadaism is the first Romanian artistic and literary movement to become international. Dadaism and Surrealism are fundamental parts of the avant-garde, the most revolutionary form of modernism. The Romanian avant garde is very well represented by Ion Minulescu, Gherasim Luca, Urmuz, Perpessicius, Tristan Tzara, Grigore Cugler, Geo Bogza, Barbu Fundoianu, Gellu Naum, Ilarie Voronca, and Ion Vinea. Max Blecher was a novelist whose life was cut short by health problems.

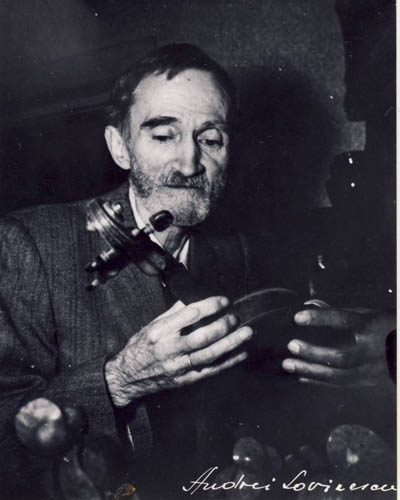
George Bacovia

George Bacovia was a symbolist poet. While he initially belonged to the local Symbolist movement, his poetry came to be seen as a precursor of Romanian Modernism. Some important literary figures of this period were also active in other domains. Vasile Voiculescu was a Romanian poet, short-story writer, playwright, and physician. Ion Barbu was a poet, as well as an important mathematician.

Cezar Petrescu was a journalist, novelist, and children's writer. He is especially remembered for his children's book Fram, ursul polar ("Fram, the polar bear"; the circus animal character was named after Fram, the ship used by Fridtjof Nansen on his expeditions). Elena Farago was also a children's writer and poet.

Ion Agârbiceanu was a writer, as well as a politician, theologian and Greek-Catholic priest. Gala Galaction was another writer, who was also an Eastern Orthodox clergyman and theologian.

Other literary figures of this era include Mihail Sebastian, Ionel Teodoreanu, Panait Istrati, Gib Mihăescu, Anton Holban, Otilia Cazimir, Ion Pillat and George Topîrceanu.

== Postbellum Literature ==
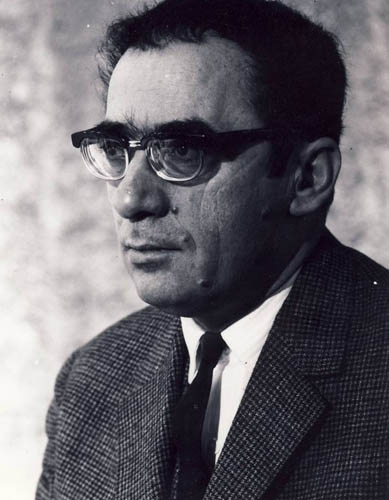
Marin Preda

Marin Preda is an important post-World War II Romanian novelist. His novel, Moromeții ("The Moromete Family"), describes the life and difficulties of an ordinary peasant family in pre-war Romania, and later during the advent of Communism in Romania. His most important book remains Cel mai iubit dintre pământeni ("The Most Beloved of Earthlings"), a cruel description of communist society. Zaharia Stancu published his first important novel, Desculț (Barefoot), in 1948. Both Preda and Stancu depicted rural life in Southern Romania (both writers were born in Teleorman County).

Some of the most important poets are Nichita Stănescu, Marin Sorescu, Ana Blandiana, Leonid Dimov, and Ștefan Augustin Doinaș. An important novelist of this era was Radu Tudoran. Mircea Nedelciu was a short-story writer, novelist, essayist and literary critic. Constantin Chiriță was a writer whose works were mainly targeted to the young public, and who remains best known for his five-volume cycle entitled Cireșarii. Mircea Sântimbreanu also wrote children's literature.

Outside Romania, Eugène Ionesco and Emil Cioran represented the national spirit at the highest level. Ionesco is one of the foremost playwrights of the Theatre of the Absurd. Beyond ridiculing the most banal situations, Ionesco's plays depict in a tangible way the solitude of humans and the insignificance of one's existence. Cioran was a writer and philosopher.

== Contemporary literature ==
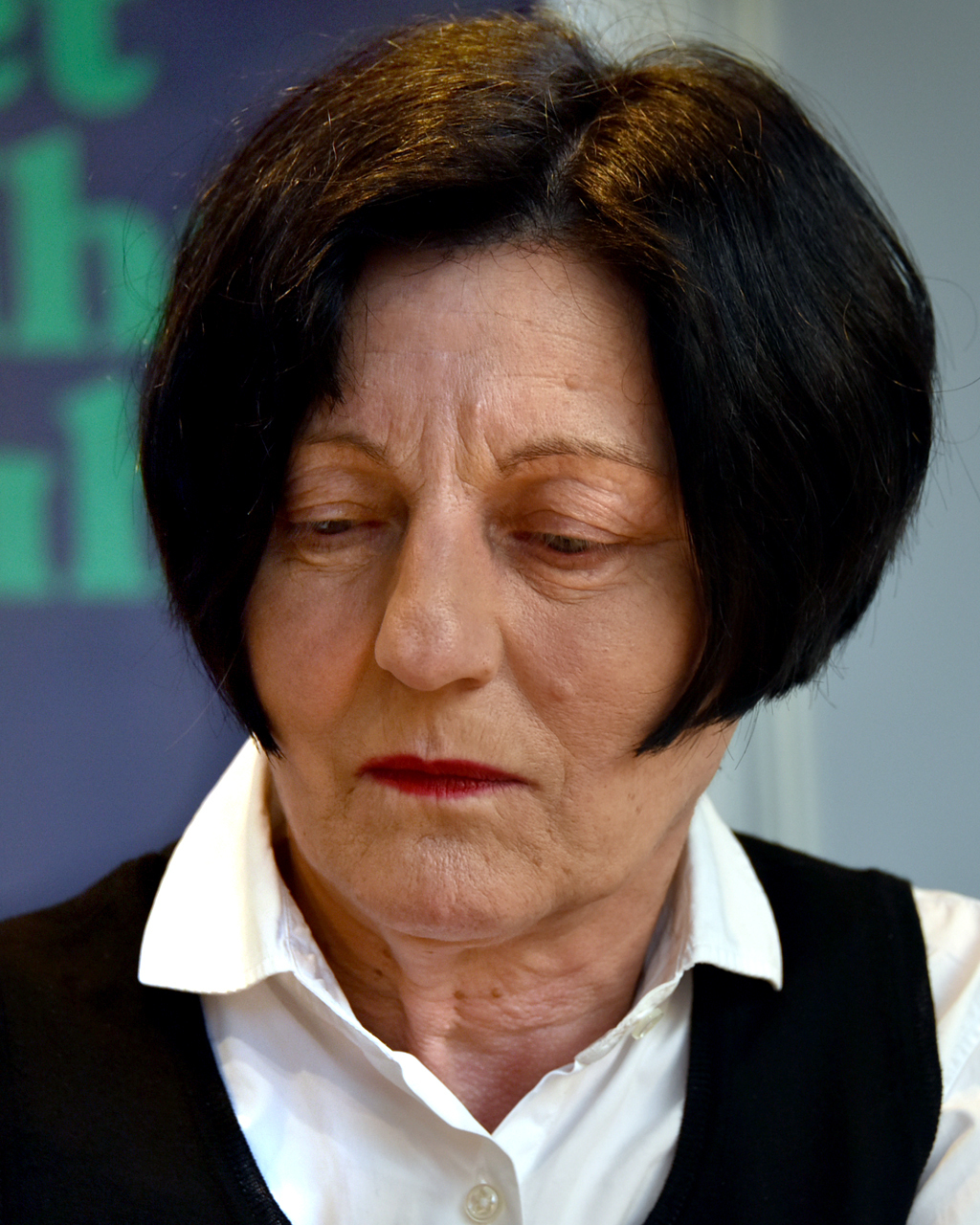
Herta Müller

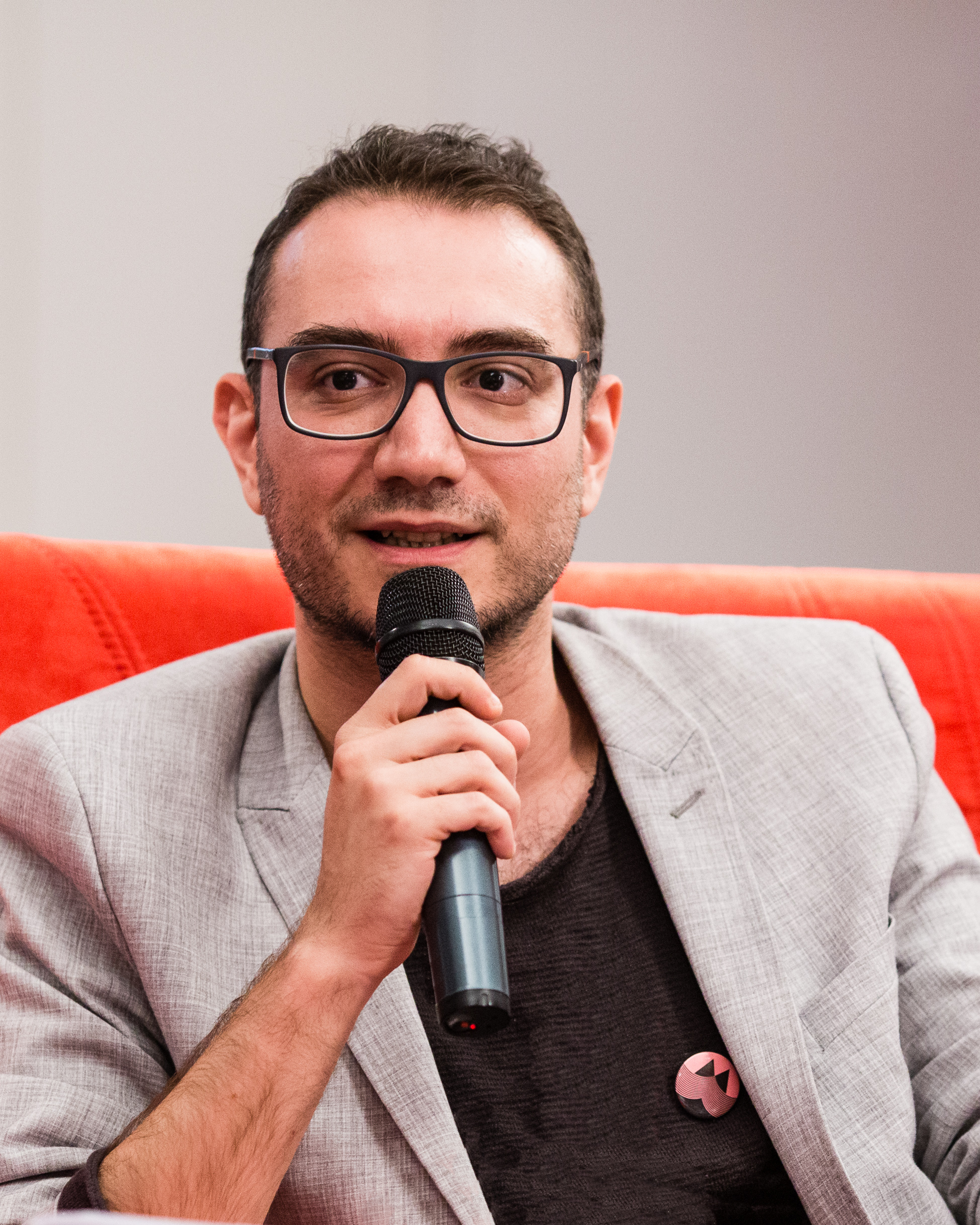
Claudiu Komartin

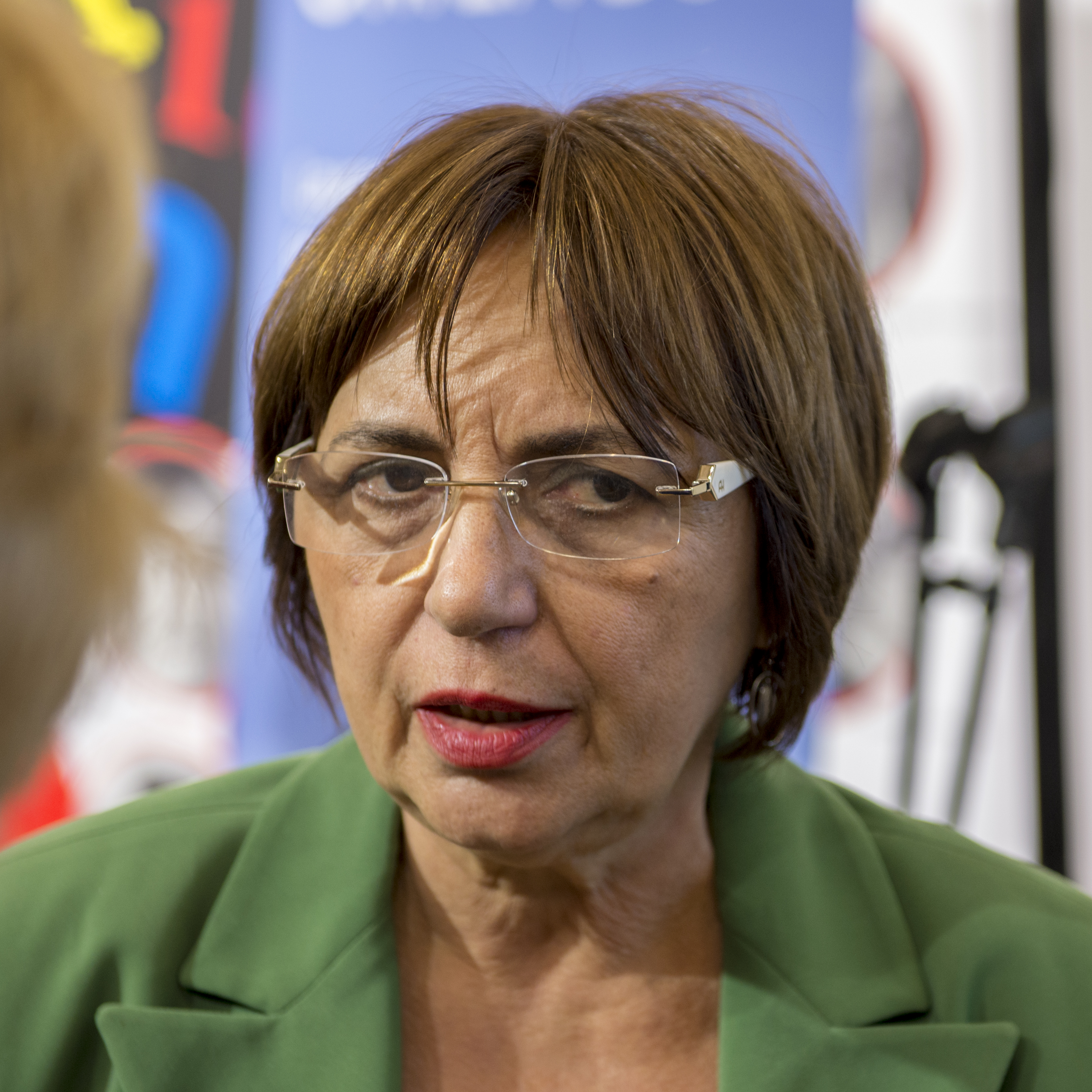
Gabriela Adameșteanu

Georges Dumitresco

Some Romanian contemporary writers:

- Gabriela Adameșteanu
- Ștefan Agopian
- Radu Aldulescu
- Nicolae Breban
- Svetlana Cârstean
- Mircea Cărtărescu
- Traian T. Coșovei
- Gheorghe Crăciun
- Alexandru Ecovoiu
- Dumitru Găleșanu
- Radu Pavel Gheo
- Ioan Groșan
- Florin Iaru
- Claudiu Komartin
- Ion Bogdan Lefter
- Norman Manea
- Dan C. Mihăilescu
- Grid Modorcea
- Herta Müller (2009 Nobel Laureate)
- Ion Mureșan
- Mircea Nedelciu
- Ioana Pârvulescu
- Dora Pavel
- Dumitru Radu Popescu
- Simona Popescu
- Sorin Preda
- Doina Ruști
- Tudor Dumitru Savu
- Dan Sociu
- Cecilia Ștefănescu
- Ion Stratan
- Bogdan Suceavă
- Cristian Teodorescu
- Dumitru Țepeneag
- Mahmoud Djamal

== Chronology: 19th century – present ==
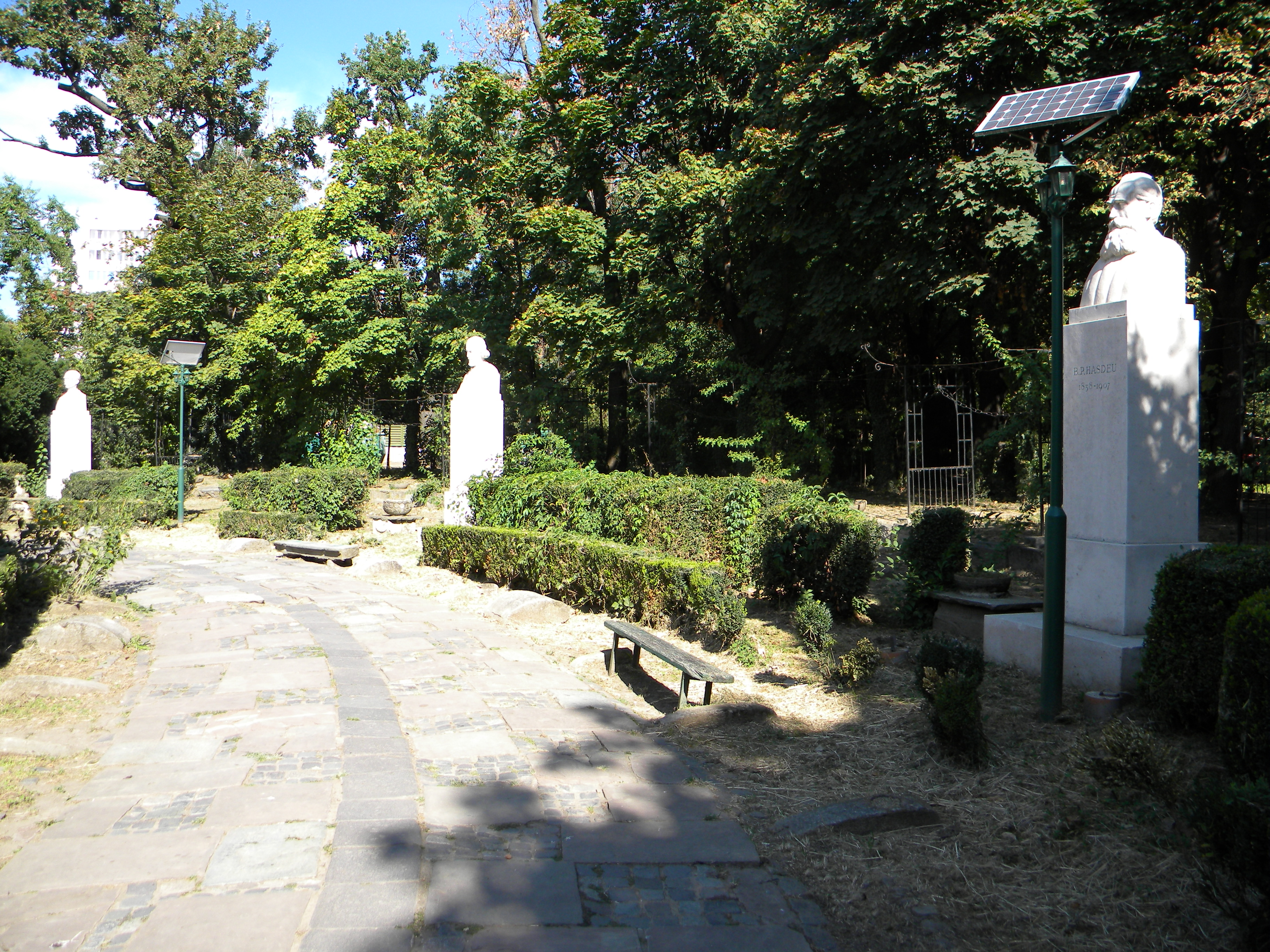
Rotonda scriitorilor in Cișmigiu Gardens, featuring busts of Romanian writers

- 1812 Țiganiada Ioan Budai-Deleanu (epic poem)
- 1832 Fabule Grigore Alexandrescu (fables)
- 1840 Alexandru Lăpușneanul Costache Negruzzi (historical novella)
- 1847 Povestea vorbii Anton Pann (narrative poem)
- 1850 Cântarea României Alecu Russo (epic poetry)
- 1850-1875 Chirița plays, Vasile Alecsandri (plays)
- 1861–1863, posthoumously Românii supt Mihai-Voievod Viteazul Nicolae Bălcescu (historical non-fiction)
- 1863 Ciocoii vechi și noi Nicolae Filimon (novel)
- 1867 Răzvan și Vidra Bogdan Petriceicu Hasdeu (play)
- 1871 Pasteluri Vasile Alecsandri (poetry)
- 1883 Poezii Mihai Eminescu (poetry)
- 1884 O Scrisoare Pierdută I.L. Caragiale (play)
- 1892 Amintiri din copilărie Ion Creangă (autobiographical novel)
- 1893 Balade și idile George Coșbuc (poetry)
- 1894 Mara Ioan Slavici (novel)
- 1894-1911 The Comăneștenilor literary cycle, comprising Viața la țară, Tănase Scatiu, În război, Îndreptări, and Anna Duiliu Zamfirescu (novel)
- 1901 România pitorească Alexandru Vlahuță (travelogue)
- 1909-1910 Trilogia Moldovei (Apus de soare, Viforul, Luceafărul) Barbu Ștefănescu Delavrancea (plays)
- 1920 Ion Liviu Rebreanu (novel)
- 1922 Pădurea Spânzuraților Liviu Rebreanu (novel)
- 1924 În Marea Trecere Lucian Blaga (poetry)
- 1925 Danton Camil Petrescu (play)
- 1927 Concert din Muzică de Bach Hortensia Papadat-Bengescu (novel)
- 1927 Cuvinte Potrivite Tudor Arghezi (poetry)
- 1928 Hanu Ancuței Mihail Sadoveanu (novel)
- 1929 Craii de Curtea-Veche Mateiu Caragiale (novel)
- 1930 Joc Secund Ion Barbu (poetry)
- 1930 Baltagul Mihail Sadoveanu (novel)
- 1930 Ultima noapte de dragoste, întâia noapte de război Camil Petrescu (novel)
- 1932 Răscoala Liviu Rebreanu (novel)
- 1933 Patul lui Procust Camil Petrescu (novel)
- 1933 Maitreyi Mircea Eliade (novel)
- 1933 Adela Garabet Ibrăileanu (novel)
- 1934 De două mii de ani Mihail Sebastian (novel)
- 1934 Ioana Anton Holban (novel)
- 1935 Huliganii Mircea Eliade (novel)
- 1936 Întâmplări în Irealitatea Imediată Max Blecher (novel)
- 1937 Inimi cicatrizate Max Blecher (novel)
- 1938 Enigma Otiliei George Călinescu (novel)
- 1938 Nuntă în cer Mircea Eliade (novel)
- 1943 Panopticum Ion Caraion (poetry)
- 1945 Plantații Constant Tonegaru (poetry)
- 1946 Stanțe Burgheze George Bacovia (poetry)
- 1946 Libertatea de a Trage cu Pușca Geo Dumitrescu (poetry)
- 1947 Don Juana Radu Stanca (play)
- 1948 Desculț Zaharia Stancu (novel)
- 1953 Bietul Ioanide George Călinescu (novel)
- 1954 Noaptea de Sânziene Mircea Eliade (novel)
- 1955 Moromeții Marin Preda (novel)
- 1956 Primele Iubiri Nicolae Labiș (poetry)
- 1960 La țigănci Mircea Eliade (novel)
- 1964 Ultimele sonete închipuite ale lui Shakespeare Vasile Voiculescu (poetry)
- 1965 Iarna Bărbaților Ștefan Bănulescu (short prose)
- 1966 Omul cu Compasul Ștefan Augustin Doinaș (poetry)
- 1966 11 Elegii Nichita Stănescu (poetry)
- 1968 Iona Marin Sorescu (play)
- 1969 Carte de Vise Leonid Dimov (poetry)
- 1969 Dicționar onomastic Mircea Horia Simionescu (novel)
- 1970 Matei Iliescu Radu Petrescu (novel)
- 1973 Vânătoarea Regală Dumitru Radu Popescu (novel)
- 1975 Lumea în Două Zile George Bălăiță (novel)
- 1977 Cartea de la Metropolis Ștefan Bănulescu (novel)
- 1977 Bunavestire Nicolae Breban (novel)
- 1980 Faruri, Vitrine, Fotografii Mircea Cărtărescu (poetry)
- 1980 Cel mai iubit dintre pământeni Marin Preda (novel)
- 1983 Dimineață Pierdută Gabriela Adameșteanu (novel)
- 1983 Poeme de Amor Mircea Cărtărescu (poetry)
- 1988 versuri vechi, nouă Mircea Ivănescu (poetry)
- 1989 Și Ieri Va Fi o Zi Mircea Nedelciu (short prose)
- 1990 Levantul Mircea Cărtărescu (epic poem)
- 1993 Nostalgia Mircea Cărtărescu (short prose)
- 1996 Amantul Colivaresei Radu Aldulescu (novel)
- 1996 Coaja lucrurilor, sau Dansând cu Jupuita Adrian Oțoiu (novel)
- 1996 Orbitor. Aripa stângă Mircea Cărtărescu (novel)
- 1998 Triptic Georges Dumitresco (poetry)
- 2002 Orbitor. Corpul Mircea Cărtărescu (novel)
- 2004 Omulețul roșu Doina Ruști (novel)
- 2004 Pupa Russa Gheorghe Crăciun (novel)
- 2004 Proorocii Ierusalimului Radu Aldulescu (novel)
- 2006 Zogru Doina Ruști (novel)
- 2007 Orbitor. Aripa dreaptă Mircea Cărtărescu (novel)
- 2008 Fantoma din moară Doina Ruști (novel)
- 2009 Lizoanca la 11 ani Doina Ruști (novel)
- 2010 Rădăcina de bucsau Ovidiu Nimigean (novel)
- 2015 Solenoid Mircea Cărtărescu (novel)
- 2016 Tratat pentru nemurire Dumitru Găleșanu (poetry)
- 2022 Theodoros Mircea Cărtărescu (novel)
- 2023 Mirabile iubiri Dumitru Găleșanu (novel)

=== Translations of Romanian literature ===
- "Testament – Anthology of Modern Romanian Verse – Bilingual Edition – English/Romanian" (Daniel Ioniță, with Eva Foster and Daniel Reynaud; Editura Minerva 2012 – ISBN 978-973-21-0847-5). This presents a comprehensive selection of Romanian poetry from 1850 to the present (post 2010) covering 56 poets and over 75 poems. It includes classics such as Vasile Alecsandri, Mihai Eminescu, Ion Minulescu, George Coșbuc, Tudor Arghezi, Vasile Voiculescu, Nicolae Labiș, as well as contemporaries such as Nichita Stănescu, Ana Blandiana, Marin Sorescu, Nora Iuga, Cezar Ivănescu, Ileana Mălăncioiu, Adrian Păunescu, George Tarnea, Mircea Cărtărescu, Doina Ruști, Daniel Banulescu, Lucian Vasilescu, Adrian Munteanu, Ioan Es. Pop, Liliana Ursu, Doina Uricariu, and others. The volume is prefaced by literary critic and historian Alex Ștefănescu.
- " The Disheveled Maidens" (Hortensia Papadat-Bengescu, Romanian Cultural Institute Publishing House 2004)
- "Something is still present and isn't, of what's gone. – A Bilingual Anthology of Avant-Garde and Avant-Garde Inspired Rumanian poetry – English/Rumanian" (Victor Pambuccian; Aracne editrice, Rome 2018 – ISBN 978-88-255-1473-5). It includes poems of Tristan Tzara, B. Fundoianu, Ilarie Voronca, Geo Bogza, Max Blecher, Gherasim Luca, Gellu Naum, Geo Dumitrescu, Paul Celan, Ion Caraion, Nora Iuga, Nichita Stănescu, George Almosnino, Constantin Abăluță, Vintilă Ivănceanu, Daniel Turcea, Mariana Marin. The volume is prefaced by literary critic and historian of the Romanian avant-garde Mădălina Lascu.

== See also ==
- List of Romanian novelists
- List of Romanian writers
- Aromanian literature
- List of libraries in Romania
