= Coșovei =

Coșovei is a Romanian surname. Notable people with the surname include:

- Traian Coșovei (1921–1993), Romanian writer and poet
- Traian T. Coșovei (1954–2014), Romanian poet, son of Traian
