= Cătunu =

Cătunu may refer to several villages in Romania:

- Cătunu, a village in Cornești, Dâmbovița
- Cătunu, a village in Sălcioara, Dâmbovița
- Cătunu, a village in Berceni, Prahova
- Cătunu, a village in Drajna Commune, Prahova County
- Cătunu, a village in Poeni Commune, Teleorman County
