= Brăteni =

Brăteni may refer to several villages in Romania:

- Brăteni, a village in Sânmihaiu de Câmpie Commune, Bistriţa-Năsăud County
- Brăteni, a village in Dobârceni Commune, Botoşani County

== See also ==
- Bratu (surname)
- Bratia (disambiguation)
- Brătești (disambiguation)
