= Colibri Theater for Children and Youth =

- Teatrul pentru Copii și Tineret Colibri
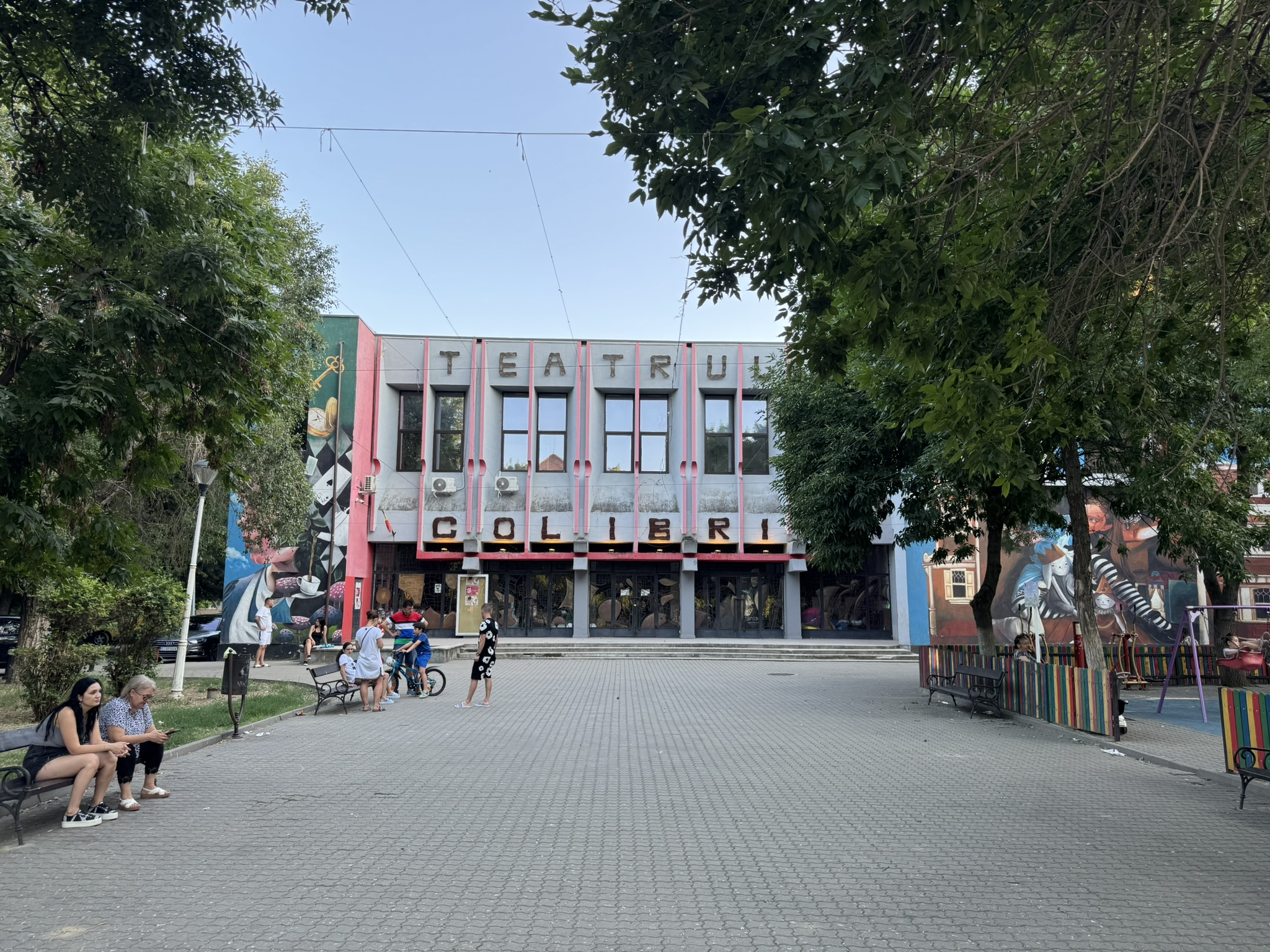
- Interactive map of Colibri Theater for Children and Youth
- Former names: State Puppet Theater of Craiova
- Address: Craiova; Romania
- Coordinates: 44.3151°N 23.8216°E

Website
- https://teatrulcolibri.ro/

The Colibri Theater for Children and Youth is a theater in Craiova, Romania, founded on June 1, 1949, under the name of "State Puppet Theater of Craiova", as part of the National Theater of Craiova. In 1956 it became administratively independent and established its headquarters on A.I. Cuza Street, inside the former Workers' Club of the Craiova Line of the State Railways building, which is now under renovation, according to plans from the city hall of it being turned into a hotel. The theater moved headquarters in 2006, into the Proiect SA building, where it was situated until 2009. The location of the headquarters has since been changed several times, today it being located on Calea București Street 56.

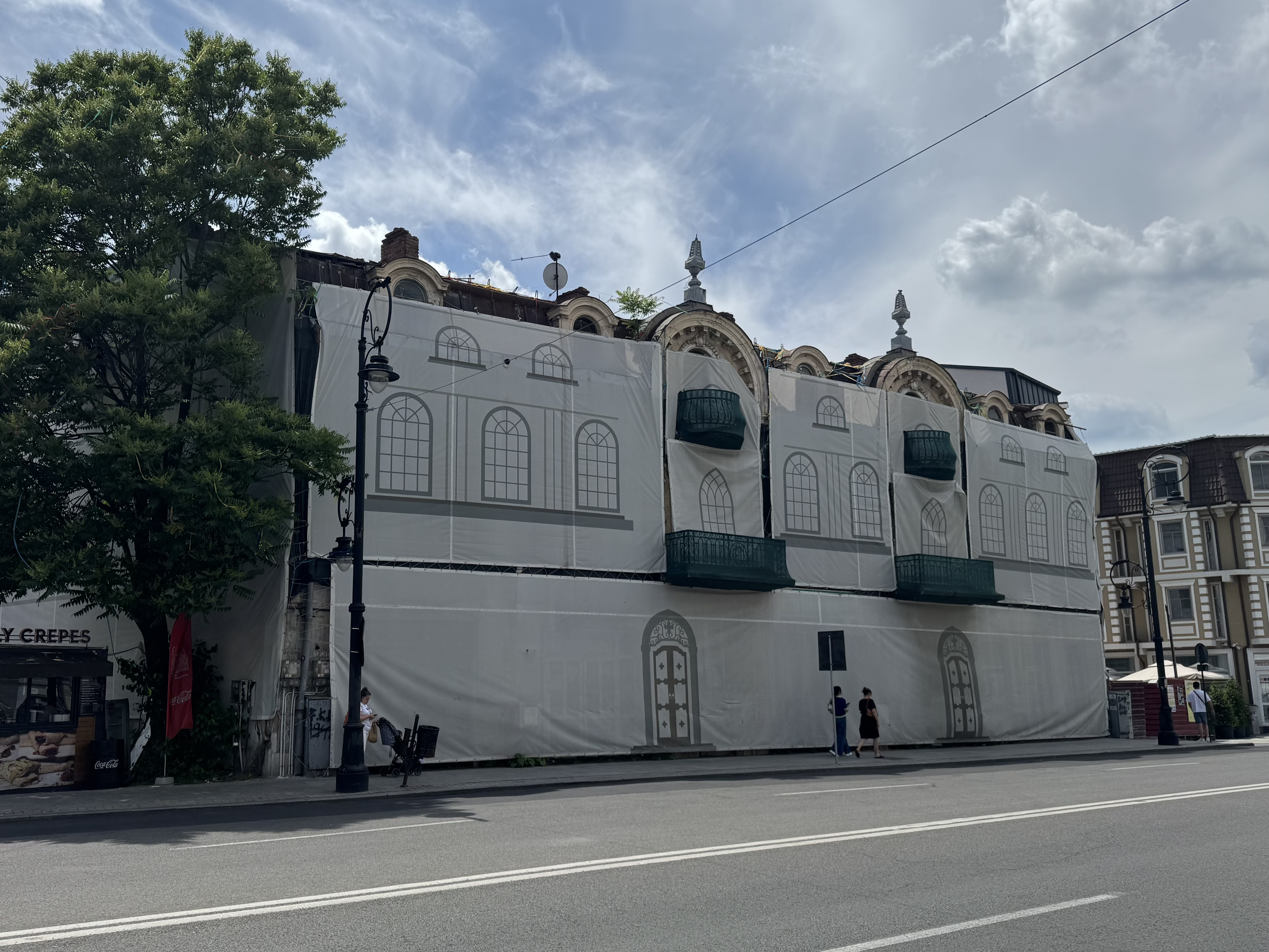
The building where the headquarters of the theater were located until 2006, still defunct in the picture (June 2026)

The first director of the theater was Horia Davidescu, who received the title of honorary citizen for his contributions to the theater. He held this position until 1984, when literary secretary Cleo Domozină took his place. In 1994, Eustațiu Gregorian became the director, up until 1997, when he was replaced by Patrel Berceanu, who changed the name of the institution into the "Colibri Theater for Children and Youth"; colibri means “hummingbird”. Patrel Berceanu died in 2006, with the National Theater paying homage to him through an eponymous festival, and passed leadership to his wife, poet and playwright Doina Berceanu. Today, the theater functions under manager Georgiana Dinescu, following the demise of the former director, Adriana Teodorescu.

The theater has an auditorium which holds 370 people, as well as other rooms which serve as creative and production workshops and offices. According to a 2020 activity report, the theater offers 32 plays, both from Romanian and international literature. Within the Colibri Theater, several other events are held, such as the Puppets Occupy Street festival, which reached its sixteenth edition and which hosts various artistic and cultural shows, or the creative workshops for children which take place in the Electroputere Parc shopping mall.
