= Dogari =

Dogari may refer to several villages in Romania:

- Dogari, a village in Ciomăgești Commune, Argeș County
- Dogari, a village in Beceni Commune, Buzău County

== See also ==
- Dogri language
