= Brătescu =

Brătescu is a Romanian surname. Notable people with the surname include:

- Constantin Brătescu (1892–1971), Romanian major-general during World War II
- Constantin I. Brătescu (1882–1945), Romanian geographer
- Geta Brătescu (1926–2018), Romanian visual artist
- Ioan Alexandru Brătescu-Voinești (1868–1946), Romanian short story writer and politician

== See also ==
- Brăescu, a Romanian surname
