= Fedeleșoiu =

Fedeleşoiu may refer to several villages in Romania:

- Fedeleşoiu, a village in Ciomăgești Commune, Argeș County
- Fedeleşoiu, a village in Dăești Commune, Vâlcea County
