= Dumitresco =

Dumitresco is a surname. Notable people with the surname include:

- Georges Dumitresco (1922–2008), Romanian-Swiss physician, painter, illustrator, and poet
- Natalia Dumitresco (1915–1997), French-Romanian abstract painter
