= Tăriceni =

Tăriceni may refer to several villages in Romania:

- Tăriceni, a village in Frăsinet Commune, Călărași County
- Tăriceni, a village in Șirna Commune, Prahova County
