= Spiru Haret Dobrujan College =

High school in Tulcea, Romania

Coordinates: 45.1807°N 28.8065°E

Spiru Haret Dobrujan College (Romanian: Colegiul Dobrogean Spiru Haret) is a high school located at 14 Noiembrie Street, nr. 22 in Tulcea, Romania.

The school traces its origins to 1883, when a real gymnasium for boys was established. Shut down due to an economic crisis in 1885, it reopened in 1890 with three and then four grades. It became a high school in 1897, with the addition of a fifth grade, and had seven grades by 1899. In 1902, Education Minister Spiru Haret approved construction of the first dedicated building for what was then the only high school in Northern Dobruja. The following year, it was named for Prince Carol, heir to the throne. The region's first student publication appeared there in 1906. The school library, opened in 1916, was the first public library in Tulcea.

On December 1, 1916, the school shut down after the city came under Bulgarian occupation during World War I; it reopened in 1918. A bust of Haret was unveiled nearby in 1923. The north wing of the school was built in 1925–1926; it featured ten classrooms with terracotta stoves, electric lighting and suitable furniture, while the schoolyard was paved and surrounded by a stone fence. By 1927, teacher's rooms, a reception room, basement and attic had been added. The name of Carol was dropped in 1941; a year earlier, he had abdicated as king.

In 1948, after the onset of the communist regime, the girls’ high school was merged into the boys’ and the institution thus became co-educational. Another wing, with ten classrooms and three science laboratories, dates to 1971. The same year, the school was named after Haret. Workshops and a museum opened in 1973. The present name dates to 1996.

The school building is listed as a historic monument by Romania's Ministry of Culture and Religious Affairs, which supplies a construction date of 1925–1930. The Haret bust is also listed.

== Alumni ==
- Constantin I. Brătescu
- Nicolae Cornățeanu
- Traian Coșovei
- Anton Carpinschi
- Orest Tafrali
- Tora Vasilescu
