= Constantin I. Brătescu =

Romanian geographer (1882–1945)

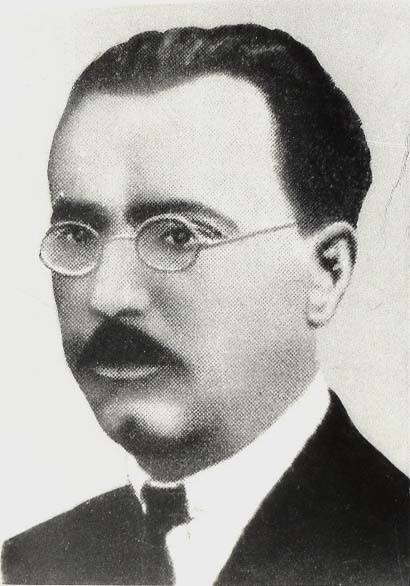
Constantin I. Brătescu

Constantin I. Brătescu (September 30, 1882 – October 23, 1945) was a Romanian geographer.

== Biography ==
Born in Câșla, Tulcea County, he attended primary school in his native village, with his father as teacher, followed by Spiru Haret High School in Tulcea. He then entered the letters and philosophy faculty of the University of Bucharest in 1901, transferred to geography and graduated in 1906. For a time, he was an assistant to Simion Mehedinți. From 1910 to 1912, he continued his studies at Leipzig and Berlin. His 1920 thesis dealt with the origins and evolution of the Danube Delta from a morphological and chronological perspective. From 1916 to 1924, except for two years during World War I, he taught at the normal school in Constanța, beginning to develop a reputation as a scientist. In June 1919, he was elected a corresponding member of the Romanian Academy. From 1924 to 1939, he was a professor at the science faculty of Cernăuți University, serving as dean in 1930–1933. He helped found the magazines Arhiva Dobrogei and Analele Dobrogei, bringing the latter to Cernăuți and continuing to edit it until his departure for the University of Bucharest, where he taught general and human geography. He was involved in the cultural and scientific life of Bukovina, helping found a local chapter of the Romanian Geographic Society. Most of his studies are about his native Dobruja; a single one, from 1925, is about Bukovina. He died in Bucharest.
