= Anton Carpinschi =

Romanian political philosopher and professor emeritus

- Born: January 17, 1947 (age 79); Tulcea
- Citizenship: Romania
- Occupation: Professor Emeritus
- Awards: Mircea Florian Prize of the Romanian Academy

Academic background
- Education: Alexandru Ioan Cuza University
- Thesis: Sociologia şi conducerea politică (1976)

Academic work
- Discipline: Political philosophy
- Institutions: Alexandru Ioan Cuza University

Anton Carpinschi is a Romanian political philosopher, professor emeritus at Alexandru Ioan Cuza University in Iași, and first head of the chair of politology of this university after the Romanian Revolution of 1989. He is an expert in political ideologies and international organizations, and the author of many publications in these fields. In December 2014 Carpinschi was awarded the 2012 Mircea Florian prize of the Romanian Academy for his book on recognition culture and human security, and its contribution to the development of Romanian culture and science in the fields of philosophy, theology, psychology and pedagogy.

== Early life and education ==
Born in Tulcea in 1947, Carpinschi attended the Spiru Haret Dobrujan College in his home town. He then moved to the city of Iași, where he would study at the faculty of philosophy of Alexandru Ioan Cuza University, from which he graduated in June 1970. At this Romanian university Carpinschi would develop his entire academic career.

== Academic career ==
Carpinschi started his academic career at Alexandru Ioan Cuza University immediately after graduation in 1970, as an assistant teaching marxist philosophy at the faculty of philology. He also became a member of the university senate in this year as representative of the association of students. He earned his PhD in 1976 with a thesis on Sociology and political leadership. After the Romanian Revolution of 1989, Carpinschi was lector in the chair of philosophy and sociology from 1989 to 1990, reader in the chair of sociology and politology from 1990 to 1991, and professor in the chair of politology since 1991. He was the head of this newly created chair from 1989 to 2001, year in which he was succeeded by Petre Dumitrescu. The last years of Carpinschi's twelve-year service as head of department were marked by controversy, first due to his own re-appointment in 1999, which was criticised on the grounds it contravened a two-term limitation recently approved by the university, and later due to the appointment of Carpinschi's sister as a lecturer in the department he directed. In 2012 he was appointed professor emeritus. Carpinschi also had a prolific activity as a doctoral advisor, and years after his retirement he still coordinated a module on The Captive Mind for doctoral students in sociology, political science and communication. An expert in political philosophy, he is also invited by media to comment on current social and political issues. In 2022, Carpinschi was conferred an honorary doctorate by Petre Andrei University of Iași and recognised as the founder of the school of political science of this university.

== Selected works ==
- Organizaţii internaţionale (with Diana Margarit), Polirom, 2011. Available in English: International Organizations, Alexandru Ioan Cuza University Press, Iaşi, 2012.
- Cultura recunoaşterii şi securitatea umană, Institutul European, 2012. Mircea Florian Prize of the Romanian Academy.
