= Traian Coșovei =

Romanian writer and poet (1921–1993)

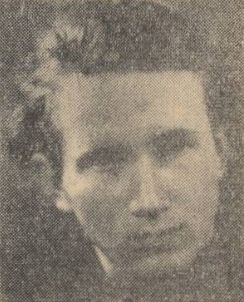
Coșovei c. 1964

Traian Coșovei (24 March 1921, Somova, Tulcea County – 16 July 1993, Bucharest) was a Romanian writer and poet.

Traian Coșovei was born in the Danube Delta in a fisherman's family. After attending high school in Tulcea, he graduated from the Letters and Philosophy Department of the University of Bucharest in 1947.

A follower of socialist realism, he is known for having written highly positive reportages and journey accounts from his trip to the Soviet Union, and for having compared Nicolae Ceaușescu to national bard Mihai Eminescu.

The school in his home village is called in his honor.

He is the father of Traian T. Coșovei.

== Books ==
- La Taliane, București, 1950
- Prietenie, București, 1951
- Împărăția vânturilor, București, 1954
- Sub cerul liber, București, 1954
- Uriașul preludiu, București, 1955
- Farmecul genezei, București, 1956
- Dimensiuni. Peisaj sovietic, București, 1957
- Dobrogea de aur, București, 1958
- Cântec să crească băiatul, București, 1959
- Semnul din larg, București, 1960
- Oceanul, București, 1962
- Răul porni mai departe, București, 1962
- Stelele dimineţii, București, 1964
- Firul de iarbă, București, 1965
- Tânărul meu Ulise, București, 1966
- Când mă grăbeam spre mare, București, 1967
- Pe urmele voastre, București, 1967
- Informaţia ereditară, București, 1969
- Prietenă cu focul şi cu apa, București, 1969
- Oda zilnică, București, 1970
- O colibă sub fereastra ta, București, 1971
- Fata cu părul lung, București, 1972
- Lauda fluviului, București, 1974
- Mai fericiţi decât Ulise, București, 1974
- Tuturor drumurilor, București, 1974
- La ţărmul cu lună, București, 1977
- Dobrogea de aur, București, 1978
- Farmecul geneza, București, 1979
- Tropaeum Traiani, București, 1982
- Banchetul toamnei, București, 1984
- Când cerul se schimbă, București, 1987

== Awards ==
- Romanian Academy's "Alexandru Sahia" Award (1955)
