= Bratu 220 =

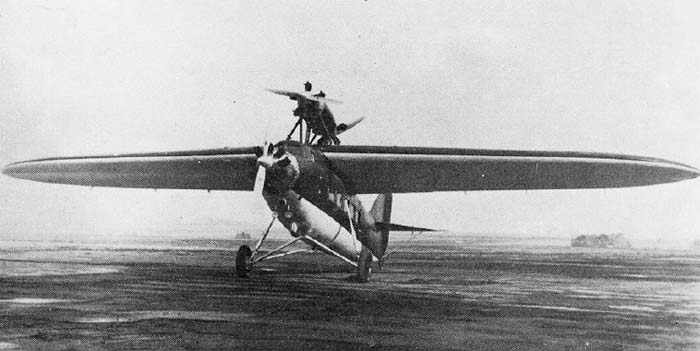

General information
- Type: Passenger aircraft
- Designer: Romulus Bratu
- Status: prototype
- Number built: 1

History
- First flight: 26 November 1932

The Bratu-220 was a Franco-Romanian prototype three-engine airplane of the 1930s, built in France.

== Development and usage ==
The aircraft was designed in 1929 by Romulus Bratu, a Romanian engineer who worked in France. Quite unusual was its arrangement, with one engine in a fuselage front, and the other two in a common nacelle over a wing, in a push-pull configuration. A model was tested in a laboratory of St. Cyr Aeronautical Institute. Parts of the plane were made in a factory at Athis-Mons, and assembled in the CIDNA workshops at Le Bourget airport.

The prototype was flown on 26 November 1932 and after tests, received a French airworthiness certificate. The plane had high useful load 4500 kg and could fly on two engines. In March 1933 it was shown to the French Minister of Air Pierre Cot.

== Description ==
The Bratu-220 was a high-wing cantilever monoplane of wooden construction, with closed cab, three engines, and a fixed landing gear. Its sparless wing, with slightly swept leading edge, straight rear edge and rounded tips, was basing on a geodetical structure of crossing ribs. The crew sat in a cab before the wing. Next and below in the fuselage, under the wing, there was a cabin for 10 passengers, with rectangular windows and access doors in front and at the rear. The landing-gear was of the conventional-type, with a tailwheel.

A single Gnome-Rhône Jupiter 420 hp radial engine was mounted in the nose of the fuselage, while two Gnome-Rhône Titan 230 hp radial engines were in a common nacelle on struts above the fuselage and wing. All engines drove two-blade propellers and had no covers.

== Specifications ==
Data from

General characteristics

- Crew: 2
- Capacity: 10 passengers
- Length: 17.37 m (57 ft 0 in)
- Wingspan: 25 m (82 ft 0 in)
- Wing area: 83 m^{2} (890 sq ft)
- Empty weight: 4,400 kg (9,700 lb)
- Gross weight: 9,000 kg (19,842 lb)
- Powerplant: 1 × Gnome et Rhône 9A 9-cyl. air-cooled radial piston engine, 310 kW (420 hp)
- Powerplant: 2 × Gnome et Rhône 5K Titan 5-cyl. air-cooled radial piston engines, 170 kW (230 hp) each

Performance

- Maximum speed: 200 km/h (120 mph, 110 kn)

== See also ==
Aircraft of comparable role, configuration, and era

- PZL.4

== Bibliography ==
- Borget, Michel (December 1969). "Un avion nommé Bratu" [An Aircraft Named Bratu]. Le Album de Fanatique de l'Aviation (in French) (6): 7–9. ISSN 0757-4169.
