= Radu Aldulescu (novelist) =

Romanian novelist (born 1954)

Radu Aldulescu (Romanian pronunciation: [ˈradu alduˈlesku]; born 29 June 1954, Bucharest) is a contemporary Romanian novelist.
