= Brăescu =

Brăescu is a Romanian surname. Notable people with the surname include:

- Gheorghe Brăescu (1871–1949), Romanian writer
- Smaranda Brăescu (1897–1948), Romanian aviation pioneer
