= Somova =

- Commune
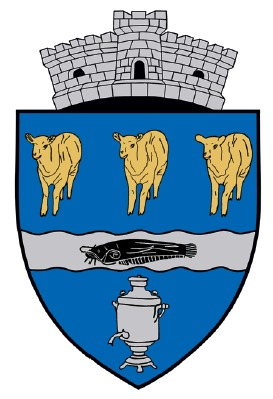
- Coat of arms

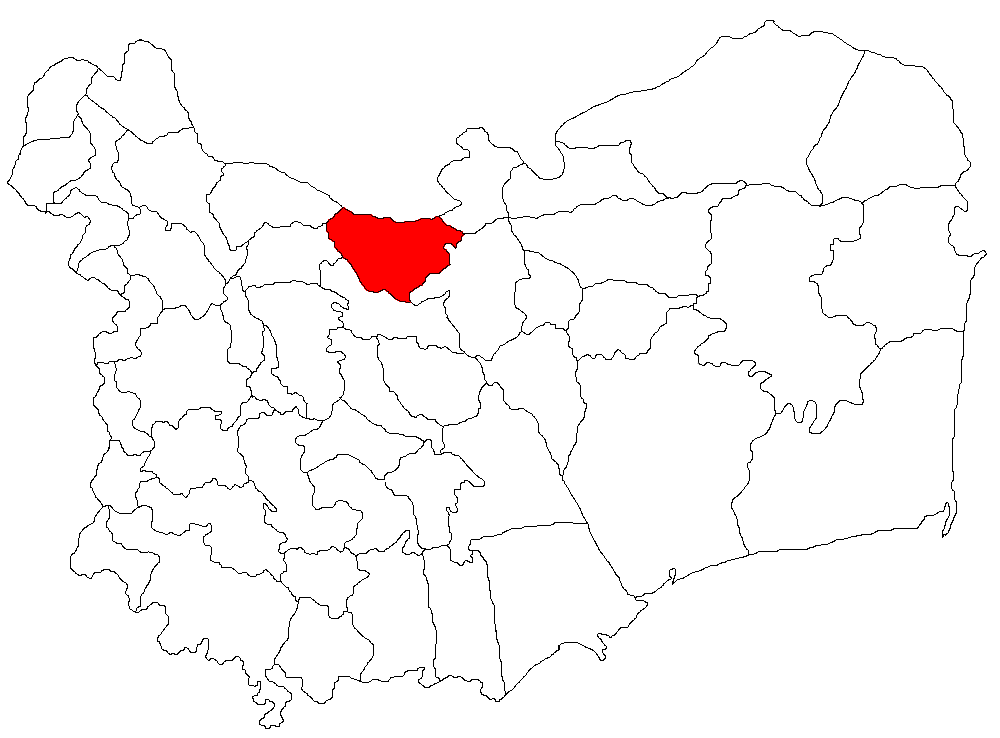
- Location in Tulcea County

- Location in Romania
- Coordinates: 45°11′N 28°40′E
- Country: Romania
- County: Tulcea
- Subdivisions: Mineri, Parcheș, Somova

Government
  - Mayor (2020–2024): Gheorghe Năstase (PNL)
- Area: 144.98 km^{2} (55.98 sq mi)
- Elevation: 26 m (85 ft)
- Population (2021-12-01): 4,878
  - Density: 33.65/km^{2} (87.14/sq mi)
- Time zone: UTC+02:00 (EET)
  - Summer (DST): UTC+03:00 (EEST)
- Postal code: 827210
- Area code: +40 x40
- Vehicle reg.: TL
- Website: www.primaria-somova.ro

Somova is a commune in Tulcea County, Northern Dobruja, Romania. It is composed of three villages: Mineri (formerly Câșle), Parcheș, and Somova.

Historical population
| Year | Pop. | ±% |
|---|---|---|
| 2002 | 4,500 | — |
| 2011 | 4,388 | −2.5% |
| 2021 | 4,878 | +11.2% |
Source: Census data
