= Șirna =

- Commune
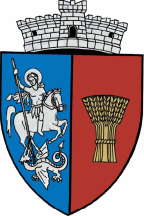
- Coat of arms

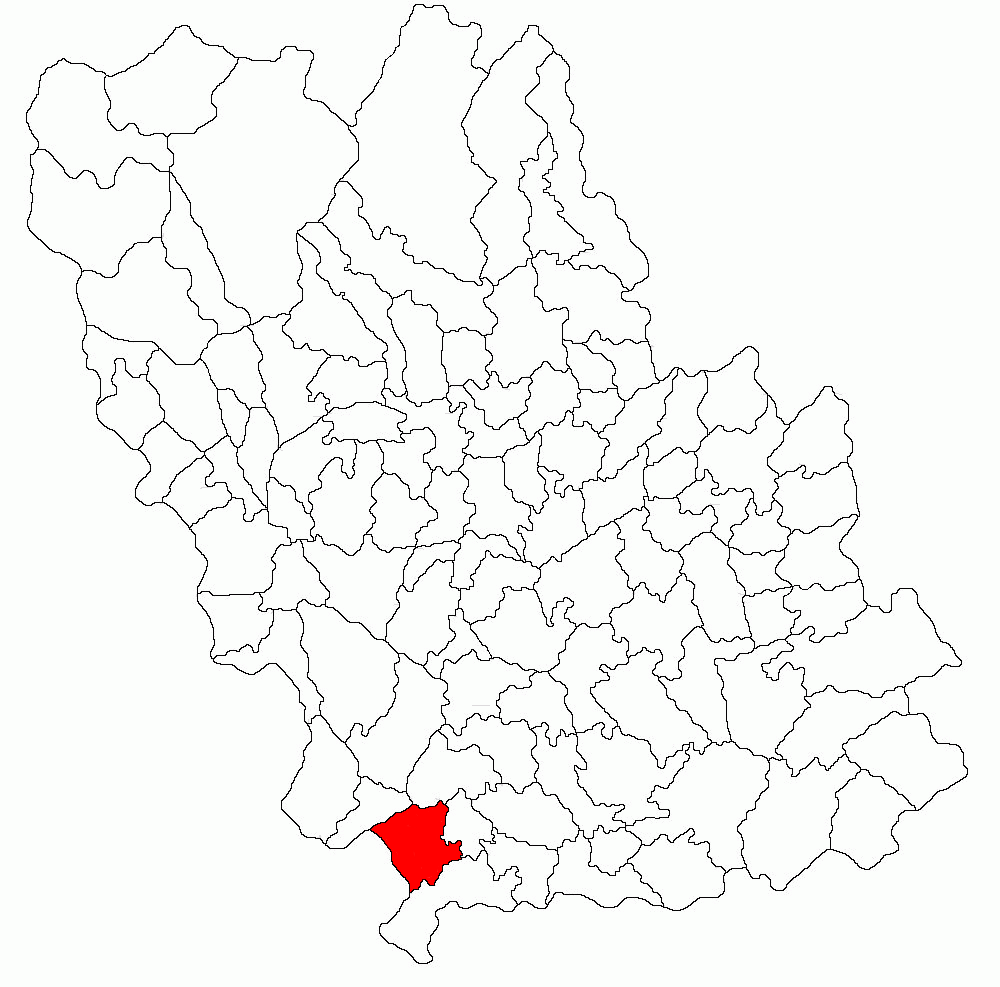
- Location in Prahova County

- Location in Romania
- Coordinates: 44°48′N 25°57′E
- Country: Romania
- County: Prahova

Government
  - Mayor (2024–2028): Valerică Sandu (PNL)
- Elevation: 125 m (410 ft)
- Population (2021-12-01): 4,243
- Time zone: EET/EEST (UTC+2/+3)
- Postal code: 107550
- Area code: +(40) 244
- Vehicle reg.: PH
- Website: comunasirna.ro

Șirna is a commune in Prahova County, Muntenia, Romania. It is composed of six villages: Brătești, Coceana, Hăbud, Șirna, Tăriceni, and Varnița.

Historical population
Year	Pop.	±%
1992	5,832	—
2002	5,422	−7.0%
2011	4,935	−9.0%
2021	4,243	−14.0%
Source: Census data
