= Poeni =

- Commune
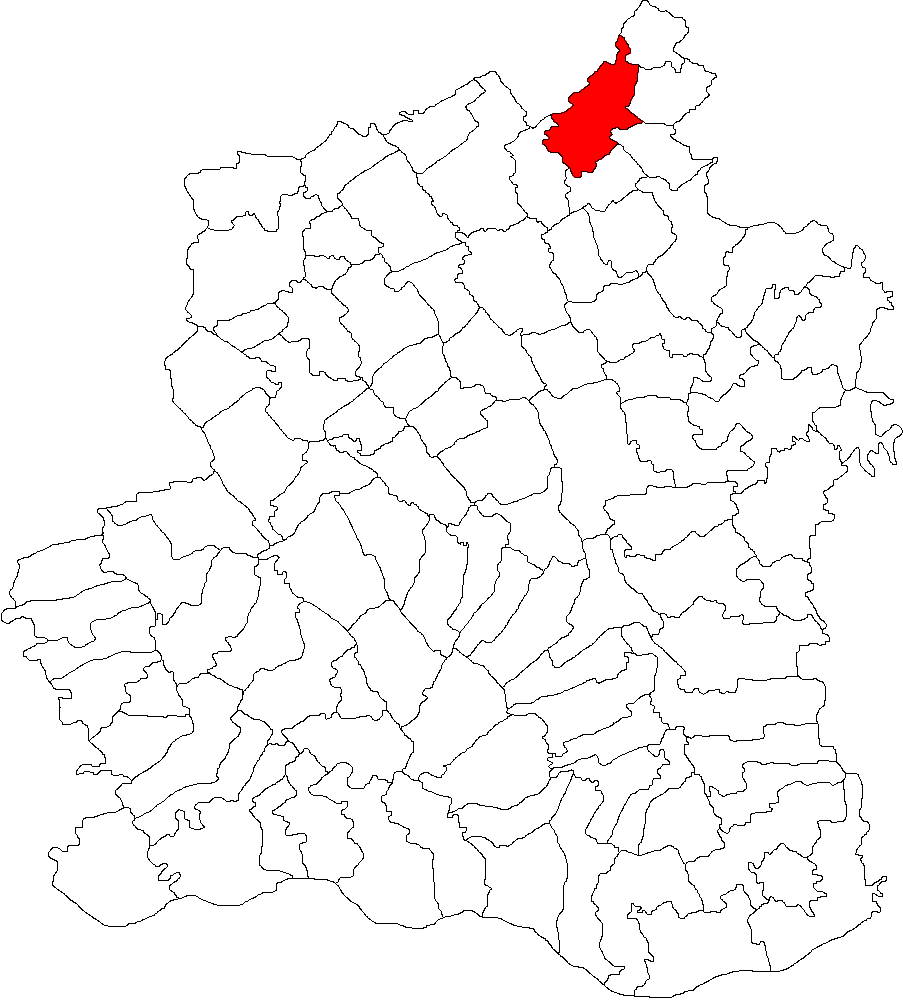
- Location in Teleorman County

- Location in Romania
- Coordinates: 44°24′N 25°20′E
- Country: Romania
- County: Teleorman
- Subdivisions: Banov, Brătești, Cătunu, Poeni, Preajba, Țăvârlău, Vătași

Government
  - Mayor (2024–2028): Ionel Ilcuș (PNL)
- Area: 45.1 km^{2} (17.4 sq mi)
- Elevation: 131 m (430 ft)
- Time zone: EET/EEST (UTC+2/+3)
- Postal code: 147270
- Area code: +(40) 247
- Vehicle reg.: TR
- Website: primarie-poeni.ro

Poeni (Romanian pronunciation: [poˈenʲ]) is a commune in Teleorman County, Muntenia, Romania. It is composed of seven villages: Banov, Brătești, Cătunu, Poeni, Preajba, Țăvârlău, and Vătași.

The commune is situated in the central part of the Wallachian Plain, at an altitude of 131 m (430 ft), on the banks of the river Dâmbovnic. It is located in the northern extremity of Teleorman County, 56 km (35 mi) north of the county seat, Alexandria, on the border with Dâmbovița County; the national capital, Bucharest, is 69 km (43 mi) to the east.

Historical population
Year	Pop.	±%
2002	3,446	—
2011	3,118	−9.5%
2021	2,985	−4.3%
Source: Census data
