= Georges Dumitresco =

Romanian-Swiss doctor poet and artist

Dr. Georges Dumitresco
- Georges Dumitresco at his art exhibition, Lausanne 1995
- Born: George Dumitrescu; 18 March 1922; Bucharest, Romania
- Died: 21 October 2008 (aged 86); Lausanne, Switzerland
- Resting place: Montoie Funeral Center, Lausanne; 46.5199°N 6.6063°E
- Citizenship: Romanian, Swiss
- Known for: Art and poetry in French, Romanian and Italian
- Notable work: Triptic (1998); Esto Memor (2008)
- Spouse: Isabella Dumitresco Simionescu
- Parent(s): Victor and Alexandrina Lebădă Ottulescu

Georges Dumitresco (18 March 1922–21 October 2008) was a Romanian-Swiss physician by profession but also a painter, illustrator and poet.

Born in Bucharest, Romania, on 18 March 1922, son of Victor Dumitrescu and Alexandrina Lebădă-Ottulescu, the great-grandson of the painter iconographer Albert Mauerhamer and nephew of Ștefan Dimitrescu, the head of the Fine Arts Academy of the city of Iași, Romania.

After completing his professional and artistic studies in Romania and practicing medicine, he fled on 13 September 1969 from his homeland and settled in Switzerland with his wife Isabella Simionescu (theater actor). After settling in Switzerland, Georges Dumitresco lived in several locations, including Sion, Yverdon-les-Bains, and Lausanne. From 1973 to 1995, he maintained a medical practice as a family doctor in Vallorbe, while also working at various hospitals throughout the canton of Vaud.

He was member of the Association vaudoise des écrivains (Association of writers of Vaud), Salon des Médecins Suisses, the Société des gens de lettres (International Federation of French language writers), of the Romanian Writers' Society and the International Medical Writers Association. His artwork became the subject of many articles and publications, mostly in local outlets.

== Biography ==
=== Early life, Romania (1922–1969) ===
Born and spent his childhood in his parental home at 80 Gala Galaction street, not far from the center of Bucharest. His father Victor Dumitresco was an economist and his mother Alexandrina (born Lebădă-Ottulescu) was a nurse and the vice president of the Red Cross in Bucharest.

Through his early school years, George Dumitresco won several national art contests. At the age of 10, was awarded Bucharest's Great National Prize, for his painting. At his young age, he also experimented with wood engraving.

Studied Medicine and graduated in 1947 as Doctor of Medicine with his thesis obtaining a great distinction (Magna cum Laude). He further specialised as surgeon while he studied art in the evenings (1954–1956), at the Popular Art school of Bucharest.

In 1955, he was a founder of the "Circle of Doctors Artists - Ion Țuculescu", a forum for doctors to exhibit their art.

In 1956, Dumitresco was arrested by the Romanian Securitate for alleged "conspiracy against national security". He was subsequently imprisoned for two years at Malmaison, a Bucharest facility for political prisoners. Dumitresco was also accused of refusing to testify against others, a choice that was reportedly rare among political prisoners at the time. According to his memoirs, he was subjected to torture and harsh conditions during his interrogation. His experiences with the Securitate were later documented in the daily newspaper România Liberă, which quoted Dumitresco describing the brutality he endured. He recounted the terror of being taken from his home at night, handcuffed, and transported to the prison.

Freed from jail, Georges Dumitresco pursued art studies while continuing to practice medicine, in Bucharest. In 1959, he was named Chief of Bucharest Hospitals Clinics and in 1966 he obtained a Diploma at the Popular School of Art of Romania. His last personal exhibition in Bucharest, prior to his departure from Romania, took place in 1969. Following her return to Vienna after the war, the artist's aunt, a pharmacist, paid an intermediary $10,000 to secure what was officially a travel permit, as documented in Esto Memor. This permit essentially served as the expatriation right, allowing the artist and his wife to leave the country.

=== Life in Switzerland (1969–2008) ===
On September 13, 1969, Georges Dumitresco left Romania and settled in Switzerland. He initially practiced medicine in Valais before moving to Yverdon, where he worked as a doctor for the Paillard company. He later established a private medical practice in Vallorbe at the invitation of the local council.

A medical doctor and an artist, Georges Dumitresco contributed articles on health topics to the daily newspaper Le Nouvelliste and also illustrated the paper and its articles.

While living abroad, Georges Dumitresco continued to promote Romanian culture and tradition. He founded the "Jura Artistique" organization in Vallorbe in 1978. The group, which continues to be active, serves as a platform for both local Swiss artists and Romanian artists living in exile.

Over the course of his artistic career, Georges Dumitresco was a regular participant in twenty annual exhibitions and held solo exhibitions in both Switzerland and Romania. His art was also displayed in collective exhibitions in several countries, including France, Italy, Belgium, Spain, the United States and Lebanon. Georges Dumitresco donated many of his paintings to embassies, churches, and museums throughout Europe, while other artworks were acquired by private art collectors, financial institutions, and various businesses.

Georges Dumitresco died in Lausanne, on 21 October 2008.

== Art ==
=== Painting and illustrations ===
A versatile artist, Georges Dumitresco utilized a diverse range of techniques, such as oil, watercolour, ink, monotype, acrylic, drypoint (pointe sèche), linocut, tapestry, and stained glass (vitrail). He is also known for creating a personal artistic style he called "xeropictogramme."

Images of his paintings and illustrations have appeared in Romanian newspapers and magazines, including: Memoria, revista gândirii arestate, Luceafărul, Literatorul and România Liberă.

During his February–March 1999 exhibition in Paris, art critic Jean-Louis Avril wrote about Georges Dumitresco's technical range in the magazine Univers des Arts:

"... the artist explores all techniques, from Chinese ink drawing to colored inks, from oil painting to engraving, from ceramics to metalwork, and even tapestry."

— Jean-Louis Avril, Georges Dumitresco - Les fins cachées de toute chose (English: The hidden ends of all things)

=== Poetry and publications ===
Georges Dumitresco authored and illustrated over thirty books of prose and poetry. In 1998, he published "TRIPTIC", a trilingual poetic anthology in Romanian, French and Italian, containing 142 poems, illustrated by 80 of his paintings reproductions.

According to Romanian poet Geo Vasile, Georges Dumitresco wrote with equal skill in French and Romanian and his book is "a book about a life of resistance through remembrance and confession, of constant revisiting of classical models, certainties of spiritual endurance, Romanian civilization and authenticity".

In a November 1999 article titled "Une Alchemie du beau" in a supplement to the Swiss magazine ph+arts, writer Maurice Métral described Dumitresco as an "extraordinary" artist, calling him a "poet of beauty, serenity, and all matters of the human soul." Métral also praised Dumitresco as a "brilliant painter of faith in humanity and nature, in the omnipresence of God."

== Recognition ==
- The art of Georges Dumitresco was honored by both the Romanian Post and the Swiss Post, which issued special editions of postcards and postal envelopes featuring his paintings.
- According to the Memoria publication: as a recognition of his literary merits, the Society Doctors Writers and Publicists from Romania established the "Georges Dumitresco Award".

== Bibliography ==
- "Triptic" 1998 (ISBN 973-9320-08-0) a trilingual poetic Anthology in Romanian, French and Italian, publisher: Viaţa Medicală Românească
- "Esto Memor" 2008 (ISBN 978-973-160-024-6) Memories, diaries, recollections, publisher: Viaţa Medicală Românească
