= Bratia =

Bratia may refer to several places in Romania:

- Bratia, a village in Berevoești Commune, Argeș County
- Bratia, a village in Ciomăgești Commune, Argeș County
- Bratia (river), a tributary of the Râul Târgului in Argeș County
