= Traian T. Coșovei =

Romanian poet (1954–2014)

Traian T. Coșovei (Romanian pronunciation: [traˈjan koʃoˈvej]; 28 November 1954 – 1 January 2014) was a Romanian poet. He was a member of the Writers' Union of Romania.

The son of writer Traian Coșovei and Maria Urdăreanu, he graduated from the Department of Romanian Language and Literature of the University of Bucharest in 1978. He wrote a thesis on the Beat Generation.

A so-called "80s Generation" writer, he was a member of the "Monday Literary Circle" led by Nicolae Manolescu, and of the literary circle led by Ovid S. Crohmălniceanu.

Coșovei's literary debut came in 1978 with the publication of a story in the magazine Literary Romania. The following year, he began editing the Romanian Paper. In 1980 he became a member of the Writers' Union of Romania. In 1996 he was appointed in the National Museum of Romanian Literature, Bucharest, a job he held until his death.

Coșovei died on 1 January 2014, at the age of 59.

== Books ==
- Ninsoarea electrică ("The Electrical Snowfall"), Cartea Românească, 1978
- 1, 2, 3 SAU… , Albatros, 1980
- Cruciada întreruptă ("The Discontinued Crusade"), Cartea Românească, 1982
- Aer cu diamante ("Air with Diamonds"), (anthology), ed. Litera, 1982
- Poemele siameze ("The Siamese Poems"), Albatros, 1983
- În așteptarea cometei ("Waiting for the Comet"), Cartea Românească, 1986
- Rondul de noapte ("The Night Watch"), Militară, 1987
- Pornind de la un vers ("Starting from One Line") (literary criticism), Eminescu, 1990
- Bătrânețile unui băiat cuminte ("The Old Age of a Good Boy"), Pontica, 1994
- Mickey Mouse e mort ("Mickey Mouse Is Dead"), Cartea Românească, 1994
- Ioana care rupe poeme ("Ioana who rips poems apart"), Asociația Scriitorilor & Cartea Românească, 1996
- Patinează sau crapă! ("Skate or Die!"), Axa, 1997
- Ninsoarea electrică ("The Electrical Snowfall"), Second edition, Vinea, 1998
- Percheziționarea îngerilor ("The Frisking of the Angels"), Crater, 1998
- Lumină de la frigider ("Light from the Refrigerator"), Cartea Românească, 1998
- Bună dimineața, Vietnam! ("Good Morning, Vietnam!"), Călăuza, 1999
- Hotel Urmuz (literary criticism), Călăuza, 2000
- Institutul de glasuri ("The Institute of Voices"), (anthology), Cartea Românească, 2002
- Vânătoarea pe capete, Libra, 2002
- Greva căpșunelor ("The Strawberry Strike"), Libra, 2004
- Aeorstate plângând ("Crying Aerostates"), Tracus Arte, 2010

== Awards ==
- Romanian Writers' Union's Newcomer Award (1979)
- Bucharest Writers' Association Award (1994)
- Romanian Academy Award (1996)
