= Ciomăgești =

- Commune
- Location in Romania
- Coordinates: 44°50′N 24°27′E
- Country: Romania
- County: Argeș

Government
  - Mayor (2020–2024): Dumitru Diaconu (PNL)
- Area: 37.68 km^{2} (14.55 sq mi)
- Elevation: 340 m (1,120 ft)
- Population (2021-12-01): 930
  - Density: 25/km^{2} (64/sq mi)
- Time zone: EET/EEST (UTC+2/+3)
- Postal code: 117264
- Area code: +40 248
- Vehicle reg.: AG
- Website: primaria-ciomagesti.ro

Ciomăgești is a commune in Argeș County, Muntenia, Romania. It is composed of nine villages: Beculești, Bratia, Ciomăgești, Cungrea, Dogari, Fedeleșoiu, Giuclani, Păunești, and Răduțești.

The commune is located in the western part of the county, on the border with the Olt and Vâlcea counties.
