= Arnold Brügger =

Swiss painter (1888-1975)

- Born: 18 October 1888; Meiringen, Switzerland
- Died: 2 April 1975 (aged 86); Meiringen, Switzerland
- Known for: Painting, graphic design

Arnold Brügger (18 October 1888 – 2 April 1975) was a Swiss painter and graphic designer known especially for his Alpine landscapes. His early work also included urban scenes and portraits and showed the influence of Paul Cézanne.

== Biography ==
Arnold Brügger was born on 18 October 1888 in Meiringen, Switzerland. From 1904 to 1908, he trained as a lithographer at the family art-printing business in Meiringen, which had been founded by his father. From 1908 to 1909, he attended the Bern School of Applied Arts, where he studied with Ernst Linck and became friends with Otto Morach.

Between 1909 and 1912, Brügger continued his studies in Cologne, Berlin and Munich, and began painting while in Berlin. During this period, he worked in Cologne and Berlin as a draughtsman-lithographer and poster painter, while attending evening drawing classes. While in Berlin, he encountered works by artists associated with Die Brücke and by Paul Cézanne.

In Munich, Brügger met Morach again, and the two decided with Fritz Baumann to spend the winter of 1912–13 in Paris. Brügger and Morach stayed at La Ruche during this period. During the Paris stay, his work included portraits, several of Otto Morach, together with street scenes and cityscapes. After his stay in Paris, Brügger increasingly worked as an independent artist rather than as a draughtsman-lithographer.

In 1913, Brügger and Morach spent time first in the Basel Jura and later on an isolated Alpine meadow above the Hasli Valley. In the summer of that year, they worked together for several weeks at Zaun above Meiringen.

Born with one arm, Brügger was exempt from military service during the First World War and continued developing his painting during the war years. In 1917-18, he spent about a year in Geneva, a period regarded as an important phase in his early work. An active mountaineer, he climbed many peaks in the Bernese Oberland, some repeatedly, and undertook winter tours in the high Alps. He married Hanny Leuthold in autumn 1920, and they had two sons. In 1922, Brügger spent time in Berlin and Hamburg on a federal art scholarship. In 1924, following exhibitions in Bern and Basel, the Swiss Confederation acquired its first painting by Brügger.

Between 1924 and 1939, he frequently visited Paris and southern France. During his stays in Paris, he maintained close contact with Max Gubler and was also acquainted with Serge Brignoni. In Switzerland, his artistic circle included Victor Surbek, Marguerite Frey-Surbek and Ernst Morgenthaler.

After the outbreak of the Second World War, Brügger remained based in Meiringen and made only shorter trips away. He died there on 2 April 1975.

== Work ==
Brügger also worked in commercial graphic design. He produced posters, brochures and advertisements, and also designed furniture.

From 1918 to 1920, Brügger was a member of the artists' group Das Neue Leben. Founded in Basel in 1918, Das Neue Leben brought together Brügger, Fritz Baumann, Otto Morach, Niklaus Stoecklin and Alexander Zschokke, with Baumann playing a leading role in its formation. Four exhibitions in Basel, Zurich and Bern helped bring the group to wider attention.

Brügger's early work included urban night scenes and portraits, with some paintings showing the influence of Paul Cézanne. His work later engaged with German Expressionism. At different stages, his work was also associated with Cubism, Orphism and Surrealism.

In the 1920s and 1930s, Brügger focused mainly on Alpine subjects and scenes of rural labour. He often depicted mountain landscapes in misty conditions, with particular attention to changing light and weather. After breaking his leg in 1945 and spending an extended period in hospital, Brügger broke with the direction of his preceding work, adopting broader brushwork and a more varied palette.

Brügger's work attracted attention in the 1910s through exhibitions at the Kunsthaus Zürich, the Kunstsalon Wolfsberg and with Das Neue Leben. In 1954, a substantial selection of his early works was shown at the Kunsthalle Bern alongside his better-known mountain paintings. In 1964, Meiringen granted Brügger honorary citizenship, during a period of growing public and institutional interest in his work. In 2025, the Museum der Landschaft Hasli in Meiringen presented an exhibition of Brügger's graphic work.
