= Portrait of a Girl =

1930 painting by Marcel Janco

- Portret de fată (Romanian)
- Artist: Marcel Janco
- Year: 1930
- Medium: oil on canvas
- Dimensions: 110 cm × 85 cm (43 in × 33 in)
- Location: Museum of Popular Art of Constanța; Constanța

Portrait of a Girl (Romanian: Portret de fată) is a picture by Romanian painter Marcel Janco from 1930.

== Description ==
The picture was painted in oil on canvas and has dimensions of 110 x 85 cm.

The picture is part of the collection of the Museum of Popular Art of Constanța in Constanța, Romania.

== Analysis ==
The painting presents a young girl sitting in a chair. In her left hand she holds a book titled "Vie", as her hands touch the armrests of her chair. The face, hair and clothes of the girl have a strong geometry, highlighting the contours and details. Behind the chair is a monkey who plays with the hair of the girl. Objects in the room blend into the background, yet are well defined. Gray, ocher, brown, and black dominate the color scheme, highlighted with yellow, white and red. The style of the work can be assigned to cubism and constructivism.
