= Niklaus Stoecklin =

Swiss painter and graphic artist

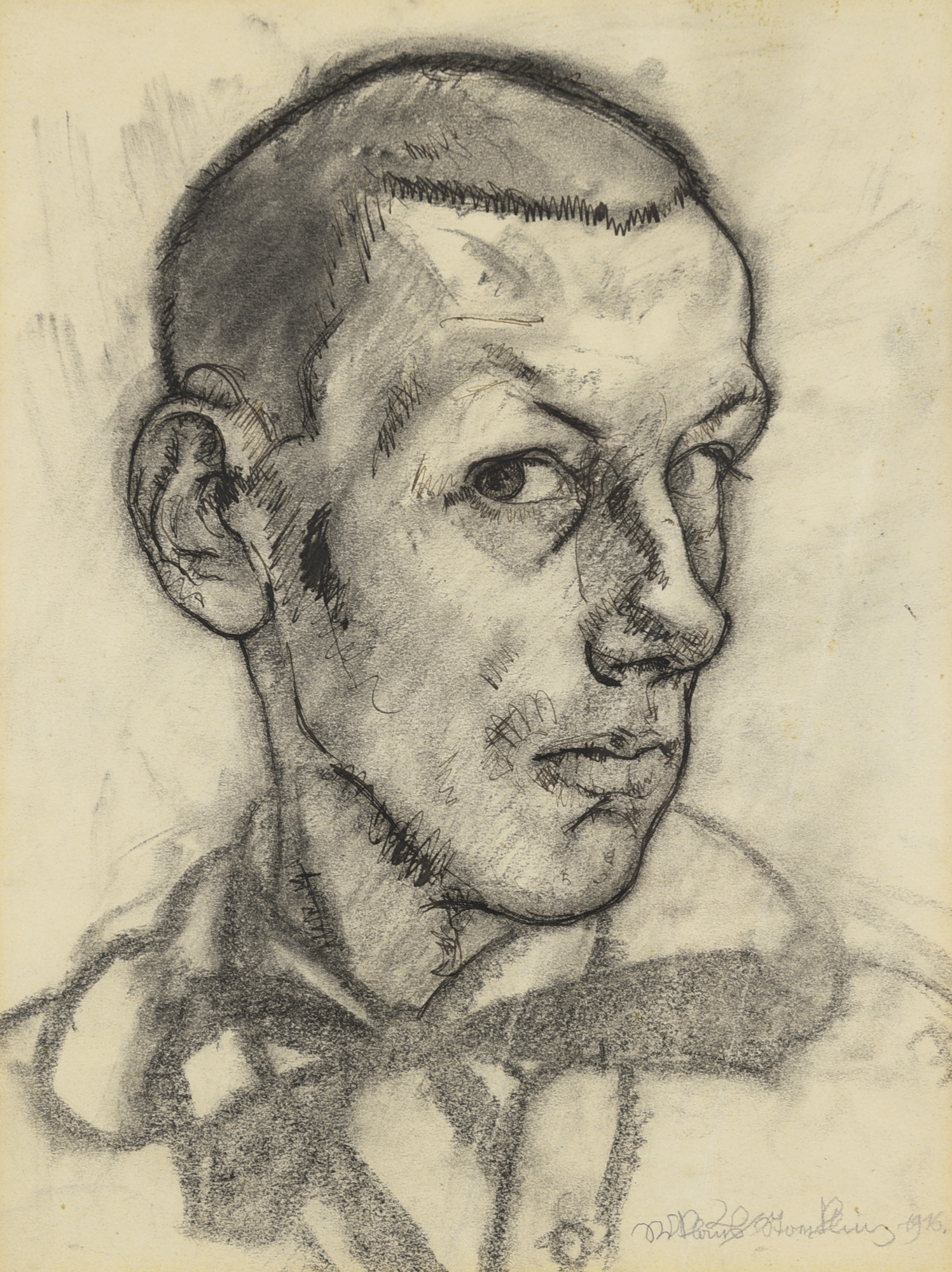
Niklaus Stoecklin self-portrait 1916

Niklaus Stoecklin (19 April 1896 – 1 December 1982) was a Swiss painter and graphic artist. He is regarded as a Swiss exponent of New Objectivity (Neue Sachlichkeit) and Magic Realism, and at least with his early works numbers among their international co-founders. He was also a poster designer of international renown.

== Early life and education ==
Stoecklin was born in Basel as the son of businessman Johann Niklaus Stoecklin (1859–1923) and Genoveva Fanny Stoecklin, née Müller (1859–1939). He was the brother of Franziska Stoecklin. He first learned to paint pictures from his uncle Heinrich Müller. Stoecklin grew up in Basel, but in 1914 went to Munich to study under Robert Engels at the School of Arts and Crafts. It was there that his friendship with the sculptor Alexander Zschokke began.

At the outbreak of war, Stoecklin returned to Switzerland and took courses at Basel School of Arts and Crafts, where his teachers included Burkhard Mangold. He spent his period of active military service in the Canton of Ticino. There he painted his Casa Rossa (1917), a masterpiece of New Objectivity that was sold just a few months later, in 1918. The buyer was Georg Reinhart, an entrepreneur of Winterthur who became the Stoecklin's first and most important collector, and a lifelong friend. In 1918 Stoecklin, was one of the founding members, alongside Zschokke, Fritz Baumann and Otto Morach, of the artist group Das Neue Leben. Ignaz Epper was another artist to whom he had contact at the time. 1920 saw Stoecklin and Albert Müller sharing a studio in San Gimignano in Tuscany.

== Professional career ==
Niklaus Stoecklin was the only Swiss artist to be included in the seminal exhibition Neue Sachlichkeit. Deutsche Malerei seit dem Expressionismus curated by Gustav Friedrich Hartlaub at Kunsthalle Mannheim in 1925. This was the show from which the New Objectivity of the 1920s and 1930s derived its name.

The years 1926 and 1927 saw Stoecklin travelling in Tunisia.

He painted his Arzneipflanzen (medicinal plants) mural in the offices of F. Hoffmann-La Roche AG in Basel in 1936. The artist paid regular visits to Paris, Venice, the village of Vairano in Ticino, where he owned a house, and the Engadine.

For many decades Stoecklin was also active as a poster designer. Some of his works in this genre were for competitions organized by the Kunstkredit Basel-Stadt. His public works, including his fresco above the public notice board for posting marriage banns on the Münsterplatz in Basel (1920) made him a well-known figure in Basel, as did his involvement in the painting of lanterns for the Basler Fasnacht. He also designed somel postage stamps for the Schweizer Post and illustrated the Schweizerfibel.

== Career ==
At his father's wish, Stoecklin began an apprenticeship as a house painter, but was soon granted permission to abandon this and train as an artist instead. The precision craftsmanship and punch of commercial graphic art was to leave its stamp on his art. Having grown up under the influence of the then dominant Jugendstil, Stoecklin began experimenting with modern styles even as a teenager. The influence of Cubism, Orphism and Futurism on his work is clearly visible, just as there is evidence of his critical engagement with the works of Louis Moilliet, Max Oppenheimer and Fortunato Depero, whose art he knew through the Basel writer Gilbert Clavel. From 1920 onwards Stoecklin would concentrate on that modern variant of realism which had first manifested itself in some works of 1916, and whose dispassionate style of representation would later be subsumed under the heading New Objectivity. Stoecklin's preferred variant of New Objectivity was Magic Realism, whereas the parallel strand of Verism with its provocative social critique is very much a rarity in his work.

Stoecklin's New Objectivity paintings combine modernist influences with those of Italian and Nordic Gothic. Especially influential was his study of Konrad Witz, whose paintings he discovered at the art museum in his native Basel. His “post-Expressionist” art bears all the stylistic hallmarks of the New Objectivity: graphic clarity, airless space, a radiant palette and a meticulous attention to detail, even to the point of illusionistic trompe-l’œil. Concealed beneath the smooth surfaces of his everyday motifs, however, are both depth and subtlety. The human condition, seeming and being, loneliness and yearning are all central to Stoecklin's work. The “magic” of his realism resides in his deliberate handling of light and shade and pictorial space. His preferred genres were still life, portrait, cityscapes andlandscapes. The emphatic frontality and tactile quality of his almost creaturely motifs also inform his posters of the 1920s to the 1940s, in which the clarity and proximity of the advertised product make us want to reach out and grab it.

Stoecklin set an example that other commercial graphic artists of the “Basel School” would emulate, among them Herbert Leupin and Stoecklin's sometime pupil Peter Birkhäuser. Some of Stoecklin's posters, Gaba (1927) and PKZ (1934) for example, became icons of international poster art. After 1945, Stoecklin's New Objectivity was superseded by a softer and more open style of painting. While he remained true to figurative painting and to his repertoire of motifs, he now tended to show them in a more upbeat way. Those few works that he produced in his final years show him returning to the contemplative content of his early paintings.

== Reception ==
Stoecklin's early works of the 1910s soon met with acclaim among art lovers and collectors alike. His masterpiece Casa Rossa (1917) was reproduced in a 1918 edition of the German art magazine Das Kunstblatt, and two years later he took part in his first major exhibition, alongside Giovanni Giacometti and Albert Müller, at Kunsthalle Basel, which in 1928 would dedicate a whole show to his work. His first solo exhibition at a major institution was at Kunstmuseum Winterthur in 1927. Stoecklin's works were winning admiration in Germany even before his invitation to the Mannheim Neue Sachlichkeit exhibition of 1925, and in 1918 he had taken part in a group show of the Freie Secession in Berlin. The 1920s saw him included in ever more group shows in Germany, meaning that his paintings could be seen not just in Mannheim, but also in Karlsruhe, Dresden, Chemnitz, Hannover and Hamburg.

The first presentation of Stoecklin's works in Paris was in the L’Art Suisse contemporain exhibition at the Jeu de Paume in 1934, after which international interest in his works all but dried up. Only in Switzerland did he still have solo exhibitions: at Kunsthalle Basel in 1940 and at Kunsthalle Bern in 1943. After the war, a solo presentation at the Overbeck-Gesellschaft in Lübeck in 1959 sought to pick up the thread, though the hoped-for international rediscovery failed to materialize. It was not until the 1970s reappraisal of New Objectivity that Stoecklin was accorded Europe-wide recognition as one of the great pioneers of the style, leading to his inclusion in exhibitions in Milan, Mannheim, Vienna and Berlin. His rediscovery in Switzerland was prompted by the 1979 show Neue Sachlichkeit und Surrealismus in der Schweiz at Kunstmuseum Winterthur, which in 1997 staged a retrospective that would also be shown at the Museum für Neue Kunst, Freiburg im Breisgau. Thanks to the 2018 exhibition Neu. Sachlich. Schweiz. Malerei der Neuen Sachlichkeit in der Schweiz conceived by the Museum Oskar Reinhart Winterthur, Stoecklin has at last became a figure of interest to a new generation of artists and art lovers. Whereas his reputation as a painter and leading exponent of New Objectivity is confined largely to Europe, as a poster designer he now enjoys worldwide acclaim.

== Works ==
Stoecklin's oeuvre comprises works in a range of techniques alongside oil painting, including watercolor, drawing, lithography, and fresco painting, as well as a large body of poster art consisting of more than a hundred works created between 1914 and 1971.

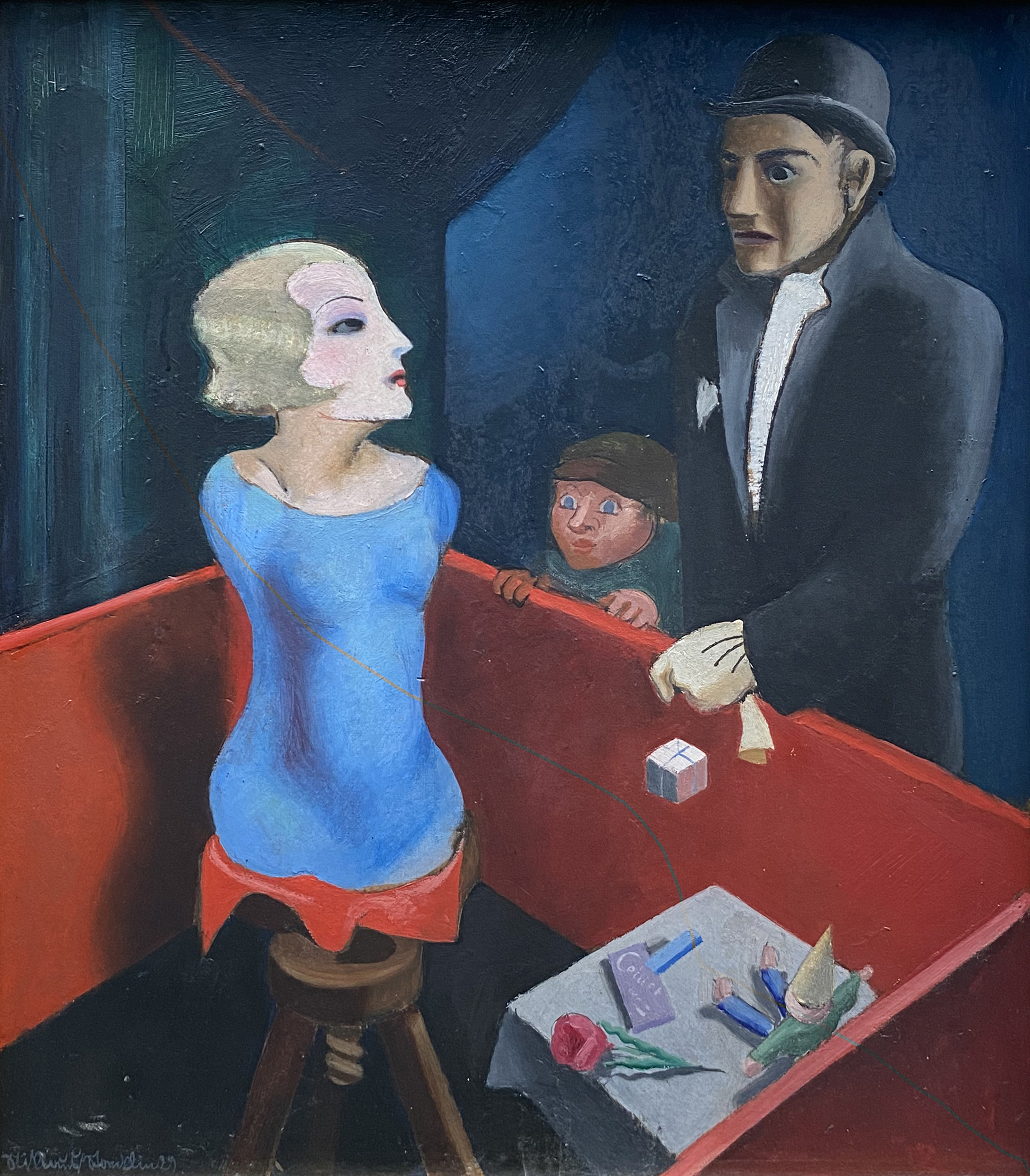
Niklaus Stoecklin, Die Dame ohne Unterleib (the Lady with no abdomen) 1929

His works are to be found in the following public collections: Aargauer Kunsthaus, Aarau; Kunstmuseum Basel; Plakatsammlung der Schule für Gestaltung Basel; Museum für Neue Kunst, Freiburg im Breisgau, Musée Cantonal des Beaux-Arts Lausanne; Museum of Modern Art New York; Kunstmuseum Olten; Museum zu AllerheiligenSchaffhausen; Kunstmuseum Solothurn; Kunst Museum Winterthur; Stiftung für Kunst, Kultur und Gesellschaft, Winterthur; Museum für Gestaltung Zürich; Kunsthaus Zürich.

== Personal life ==
Stoecklin married Elisabeth Schnetzler in 1922. Their only daughter Noëmi was born in 1923. From 1928 until his death the artist lived in Riehen, where his friends included the painter Jean Jacques Lüscher and his family. Noëmi Stoecklin married the Lüschers’ youngest son, the zoologist Martin Lüscher, in 1944.

== Prizes and awards ==
1958: City of Basel Art Prize
