= Ernst Linck =

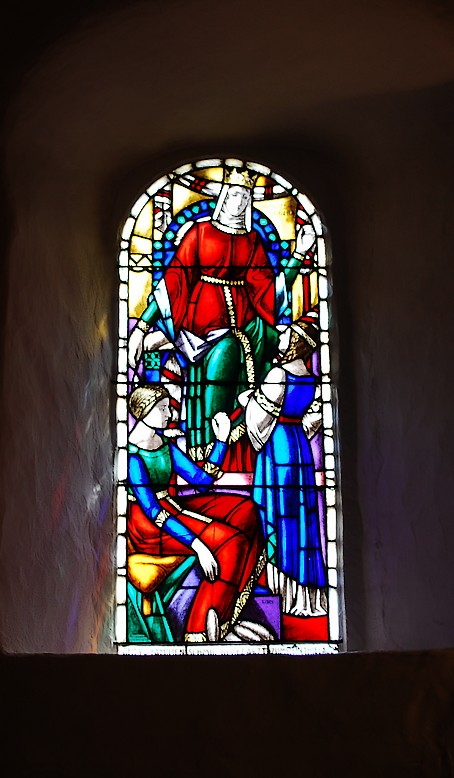
Stained glass church window by Ernst Linck

Ernst Linck (14 October 1874 – 29 June 1935) was a Swiss painter.

Born in Windisch, he became a decorator (apprenticeship in Zürich from 1889 to 1890) and then worked in several Swiss cities as a statue painter. After two study trips to Italy in 1894 and in 1899 he settled at Bern, where he opened a school of painting that he carried on until 1912. From 1904 on, he also taught figure drawing at the local school of art.

Originally a Jugendstil painter, Linck became heavily influenced in Bern by the work of Ferdinand Hodler. His paintings frequently depicted patriotic-pastoral settings.

Linck also created several works of ecclesiastic painting (murals, but also painted glass windows). He was contracted frequently as a restorer; he was responsible for the ornamental painting of the figures on the historic fountains in the town centre of Bern.

His son Walter Linck became a well-known sculptor.
