= Otto Morach =

Swiss artist (1887–1973)

Self-portrait (1913)

Otto Morach (2 August 1887, Hubersdorf - 25 December 1973, Zürich) was a Swiss painter and poster artist.

== Biography ==
After completing his primary studies he began attending the Kunstgewerbeschule in Bern and acquired his teaching certificate. For the next two years, he was active as a secondary teacher in Langnau, Kriegstetten and Wichtrach. In 1910, he found a studio in Paris and attracted the attention of Félix Vallotton, who suggested that he study figurative drawing.

After a short stay in Munich, he returned to Paris in the winter of 1912/1913 and worked at La Ruche, an artists' residence. There, he made friends with Fritz Baumann and spent several weeks painting with him in the Jura Mountains. The outbreak of World War I made it impossible to remain in France, so he divided his time between Solothurn and his mandatory military service. During these years, he switched from Art Nouveau to Cubism and Futurism.

In 1919, he became a teacher at the Zürich University of the Arts and remained there until 1953. He married Hermana Sjövall in 1923. They spent much of the 1920s travelling throughout Europe and spent their summers in southern France.

After his retirement, he painted very little. In 1971 he was awarded the Kunstpreis of Canton Solothurn.
