= Fritz Baumann =

Swiss painter

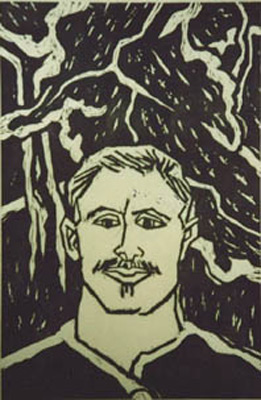
Self-portrait (1913)

Fritz Cäsar Baumann (3 May 1886, Basel – 9 October 1942, Basel) was a Swiss painter who worked primarily in the Expressionist and Cubist styles. Preoccupation with caricature, textile and pottery, puppet theater and book illustration.

== Biography ==
From 1904 to 1907, he completed an apprenticeship in decorative painting. He then studied with Fritz Schider at the Gewerbeschule (Arts and Crafts School) in Basel for one year. This was followed by a study trip to Rome with August Babberger. Upon his return, he studied at the Academy of Fine Arts, Munich. He then moved to the mountain village of Rührberg, near Grenzach, where he created drypoint etchings.

In 1909, he married Anny Rickenbach, daughter of a gunsmith from Muttenz. Shortly after, he went to Karlsruhe to study with Hans Thoma and improve his etching techniques. After the birth of his son Fritzli in 1910, the family lived in Erlenhof (Thürnen) but spent the winters in Paris working at La Ruche, an artists' residence. After a stay there in 1912, he began to focus almost exclusively on woodcuts. For a time, he was obsessed with creating portraits of his son. In 1913, they moved to Berlin, where he became a member of Der Sturm, an artists' group associated with the journal of the same name.

Anny died in May 1914. To suppress his grief, he volunteered for military service and was assigned as a Gefreiter to a Pionier-Kompanie in Ticino. It was there he met his second wife, Emma Ziswyler. He continued to exhibit his woodcuts, while in service, with the help of Herwarth Walden. Back in Basel, after the war, he became a teacher; at the Gewerbeschule and the Frauenarbeitsschule, a similar organization for women. He was also a cofounder of the artists' group Das Neue Leben, and wrote the group's manifesto:

"Wir glauben nur an eine Kunst. Es gibt für uns nicht den nach Graden eingeteilten Unterschied von sogenannter freier, dekorativer oder kunstgewerblicher Kunst. Wir unterscheiden Kunst oder Nichtkunst." (We believe in only one art. There are no distinctions or degrees; no so-called free or decorative or craft art. We distinguish only art and non-art.)

In the mid 1920s, he began to suffer from recurring bouts of depression and developed doubts about his artistic abilities. At some point, he took most of his important works from 1916 to 1920 and threw them in the Rhine. After 1928, he ceased exhibiting and focused almost entirely on teaching. He committed suicide in 1942.

== Selected works ==
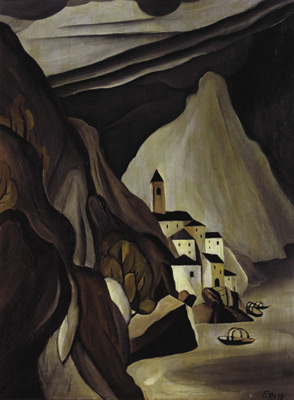
Gandria

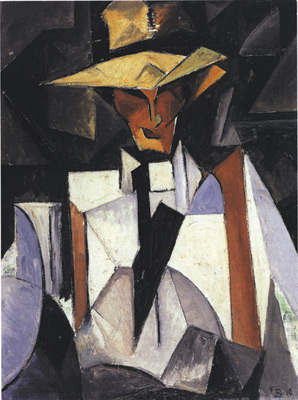
Man in a Straw Hat (Otto Morach)

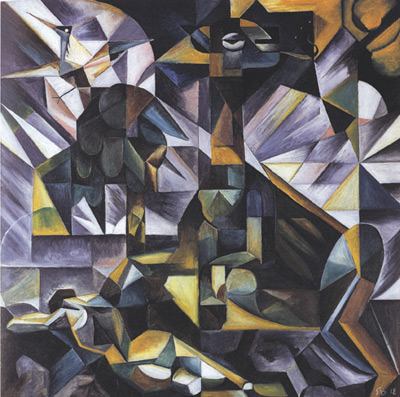
Fate

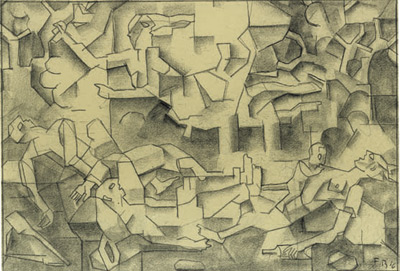
Drunkards

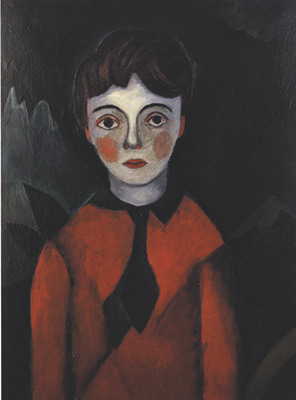
Portrait of Fritzli at age seven
