= Lucian Boz =

Romanian and Australian writer (1908–2003)

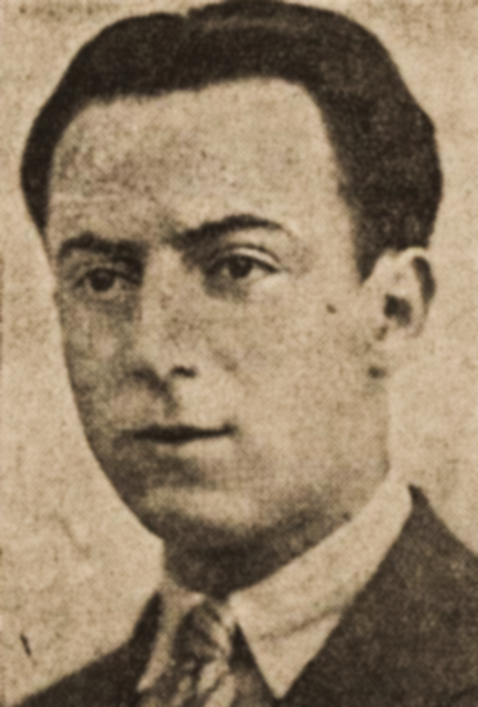
- Boz in 1932, at age 23
- Born: November 9, 1908; Hârlău, Iași County, Kingdom of Romania
- Died: March 14, 2003 (aged 94); Sydney, Australia
- Education: University of Bucharest
- Occupations: Journalist; public relations officer; welder
- Spouse: Cora Costiner
- Children: 1
- Writing career
- Pen name: Vasile Cernat
- Period: 1927–2003
- Genres: Essay; lyric poetry; autofiction; roman à clef; reportage; memoir; biography
- Movements: Modernist literature; Contimporanul; Sburătorul

Lucian Boz (Romanian pronunciation: [lutʃiˈan ˈboz]; also rendered as Lucien Boz; November 9, 1908 – March 14, 2003) was a Romanian literary critic, essayist, novelist, poet and translator. Raised in Bucharest, he had a lawyer's training but never practiced, instead opting for a career in journalism and literary criticism. An active participant in the 1930s cultural scene, he theorized an empathetic and "enthusiastic" approach to literature, which was in tune with the avant-garde tendencies of his lifetime. After a stint editing the review Ulise in 1932–1933, he became a contributor to more major newspapers, including Adevărul, Cuvântul Liber, and Vremea; he was also for a while an editorial secretary at Ion Vinea's Contimporanul.

Earning attention for his critical treatment of authors from Mihai Eminescu to Urmuz, Boz was singled out on the literary scene for his Jewish origins. His Romanian career was cut short with the advent of a censorious authoritarian and antisemitic government in 1937. Moving to Paris, he graduated from the École pratique des hautes études and settled into journalistic work, but was displaced by the German occupation. Upon this, Boz joined the French Resistance and was then interned at Drancy. His plight drew the attention of a fellow Romanian exile, Emil Cioran, who networked on his behalf; Boz was subsequently freed, becoming one of very few Jews to escape alive.

Resuming his reporter's activity, and contributing to Le Monde, Boz divided his time between France and Romania from 1944 to 1947, debuting as an autofictional novelist and translating from Jean Bruller. Though initially tolerated by the Romanian Communist Party, he never returned to his native country after a Communist regime was fully established. After a few more years in France, he left for Australia in 1951, and worked for a while as a welder. He was eventually hired by Air France to head its local office, and Boz's literary activity abated until his retirement in 1974. Afterwards, he republished some of his old work in photocopy and contributed to Romanian cultural activities in his adopted country. Never a declared opponent of the regime, his work was nonetheless unwelcome in Communist Romania, and had to wait until after the 1989 Revolution to regain critical favor. During the 1990s and until soon before his death, Boz contributed material to a Romanian magazine. In 2000, his short roman à clef, dealing with the war years, was printed as his last major contribution.

== Early life and career ==
Originally from Hârlău, Iași County, Boz was born to Jewish parents Mendel, later wounded and decorated in World War I, and Clara (née Sapina). Clara also gave birth to Lucian's elder brother, Marcel, who worked as a physician in France; close relatives included Marcela, wife of novelist Ury Benador. The Bozes moved to the national capital Bucharest in 1909, where Lucian attended Gheorghe Lazăr High School. He then enrolled in the Law faculty of the University of Bucharest, where his professors included Istrate Micescu, Constantin C. Stoicescu, and Vintilă Dongoroz. He graduated in 1934 but never practiced, instead entering a career in the press and in literary criticism.

Boz's first published work, a biographical sketch of Walt Whitman, appeared in Premiera magazine in 1927. When he was aged nineteen, Tiparnița Literară published his review of Ion Barbu's poetry. As he himself noted, he then used this text as a reference to be hired by Ion Vinea at Facla. Vinea preferred to have him work for the literary magazine, Contimporanul, though Facla also carried Boz's literary chronicles. He was Contimporanul's editorial secretary in 1930–1931, only quitting when he had to perform his mandatory service in the Romanian Land Forces; his replacement was a young Eugène Ionesco. A member of the Eugen Lovinescu-led Sburătorul literary society, Boz contributed to Isac Ludo's Adam, Adevărul Literar și Artistic, Capricorn, Mișcarea, unu (where he used the pseudonym Vasile Cernat), Discobolul, and Viața Românească. He began frequenting literary cafes, befriending, among others, Ionesco, Alexandru Sahia, and Ionathan X. Uranus. With Ludo and Benador, he also attended a Jewish literary salon at Slova printing house, where he recalled running into Barbu Lăzăreanu, Theodor Loewenstein-Lavi, and Henric Streitman.

Boz was a noted promoter of literary modernism, and, according to scholar Paul Cernat, "the only enthusiastic supporter of the homegrown avant-garde". In Contimporanul, he introduced Romanians to the work of James Joyce. It is seen by Cernat as his "most important" piece of commentary, even though (as noted by Arleen Ionescu) his reading of Ulysses contains "errors of interpretation" which "today [...] appear hilarious." In March 1930, in Facla, he published the only interview ever granted by Constantin Brâncuși, then on a visit to Bucharest. The same newspaper carried his posthumous homage to the avant-garde hero Urmuz (whom he described as a "reformer of Romanian poetry" and as a local equivalent of Rimbaud) and his praise of modernists such as Jacques G. Costin. At Zodiac, a literary sheet put out by I. Peltz, Boz wrote similar reviews of literary works by Vinea and Hortensia Papadat-Bengescu. In 1931, Adevărul daily hosted his homage to Tristan Tzara.

Alongside Em. Ungher, Boz edited his own publication, the avant-garde magazine Ulise, which appeared in four numbers in 1932–1933. Largely a continuation of Contimporanul, it grouped around it an eclectic circle, comprising Ionesco, Uranus, alongside Arșavir Acterian, Dan Botta, Emil Botta, Marcel Bresliska, Barbu Brezianu, Petru Comarnescu, Virgil Gheorghiu, Anton Holban, Eugen Jebeleanu, Alexandru Robot, Horia Stamatu, Simion Stolnicu, Octav Șuluțiu, and writer-cartoonist Neagu Rădulescu. In 1933, Boz became editor at Adevărul and Dimineața, as well as at the weekly Cuvântul Liber. At this stage in his life, he married an Adevărul colleague, Cora Costiner, from whom he would have a son, Alain.

Boz's 1932 essay on Mihai Eminescu (Eminescu. Încercare critică), originally printed in Capricorn, drew lavish praise from George Călinescu. Other contemporary critics who appreciated his work included Lovinescu, Ionesco, Perpessicius, Pompiliu Constantinescu, and Ion Biberi. Some, including the modernist Vladimir Streinu, were derisive of the effort—as noted by their common friend Șerban Cioculescu, Streinu treated Boz's "abstruse essay" with "extreme cruelty". Among later reviewers, Sergiu Ailenei notes that Boz's attempt to describe Eminescu by means of national psychology was "far-fetched". In nationalist and traditionalist circles, the work was panned as offensive and anomalous. C. Vrăbete of Neamul Românesc saw it comprising "the most fantastic aberrations" and "monstrosities", for being "fed on German theories", and for suggesting that the Romanians were contemplative and had "Slavic blood". Boz, he noted, "seems not to be a Romanian, and not to have any links with the aspirations of our people".

Before 1935, Boz was a columnist at Vremea, where he covered the modern literature of France. He followed up on his writing with Cartea cu poeți ("The Book of Poets"), published in 1935. Displaying "extreme eclecticism", it included essays about 31 contemporary Romanian poets, nearly all of whom entered the literary canon. The preface outlined Boz's credo: a rejection of critical impressionism, and an empathetic, anti-intellectual, "enthusiastically visionary", reception of the literary work up for review. His essays often focused on finding international connections for Romanian particulars, for instance tracing links between Vinea and Frank Wedekind; Tudor Arghezi, Urmuz, and Ramón Gómez de la Serna or François Villon; Geo Bogza and the Marquis de Sade. In later decades, Boz was reviewed with reserve. In 1941, revising his early stance, Călinescu suggested that Boz's "visionary enthusiasm" was "an aberration", since it impaired the selection of values. He found Boz to be an "intelligent" writer, but one of "unthinking generosity". However, he also described Ulise as the more mature of Romania's avant-garde papers. Cernat takes the middle ground, describing Boz as "second-rate", "prolix" and "rather invertebrate", but "sometimes surprisingly intuitive". His opposition to mainstream literary theory, Cernat notes, is suited to the avant-garde requirements, surpassing Călinescu's own limits. Boz, he concludes, "is worth rereading."

== In wartime France ==
Boz opposed the rise of fascism, and, in a 1937 interview with Azi, spoke out against its attempts to threaten and silence Jewish authors. In June of that year, the literary critic and Iron Guard affiliate Mircea Streinul described Boz, Andrei Tudor and Oscar Lemnaru as "little kikes" (jidănași) who actively promoted pornographic writing. After Dimineața and Adevărul were suppressed by the National Christian government in December 1937, he left for Paris. There, he took courses at the École pratique des hautes études. He took part in public conferences and attended lectures by Jacques Maritain, Gabriel Péri and Dolores Ibárruri, also joining PEN International. He met Benjamin Fondane and Ilarie Voronca. In 1939, he was accredited as the Paris correspondent of Tudor Teodorescu-Braniște's Jurnalul, and still contributed to Adevărul Literar și Artistic, which sought to protect and recover Jewish Romanian intellectuals. Boz also sent diplomatic reports for United Press. In order to make ends meet, he worked for French newspapers as well, including Le Petit Parisien, Excelsior and Dimanche Illustrée.

Boz was unable to complete his studies, due to the outbreak of World War II and subsequent German occupation. He joined the French Resistance in the Maquis du Vercors. In 1943, the Gestapo arrested him and his wife, sending them to the Drancy internment camp. While there, the only one of their friends from hunger-stricken Paris who brought them food was Emil Cioran, the Romanian philosopher. Of several thousand Romanian Jews who passed through on their way to the Nazi extermination camps, a dozen were saved by the intervention of the Romanian legation, including Boz and his wife. Once released, he and Carola went into Vichy France, where she was arrested and threatened with a return to Drancy. She was freed upon the insistent intervention of Cioran, who accompanied the couple to the border and ensured they had left France safely.

At the end of 1944, following the August coup against the Romania's pro-Axis dictator Ion Antonescu, Boz returned to his home country, where he co-founded the French-language daily L'Information Internationale. He was a columnist at Democrația, the independent left-wing weekly, and had poetry published in the Communist Youth journal, Scînteia Tineretului, while also working as an editor at Finanțe și Industrie daily and a correspondent of the Romanian Press Information Agency (ARIP). In 1945, he published an overview of wartime France, Franța, 1938—1944, described at the time by Petru Comarnescu as one of "the books that so richly provide us with full awareness about the civilizations that will shape tomorrow's world." It is equal parts memoir, historical account, and a reportage with colorful detail. The first part deals with the Paris of 1938–1940, up through the Battle of France and the beginnings of the Resistance. In the second part, which begins with Operation Torch, he describes his arrest, with a chapter on his wife's detainment written by her. He supplies descriptions of French people on both sides of the conflict and ends with the Liberation of 1944. It earned praise from the literary chronicler at Revista Fundațiilor Regale, who noted its "adherence to the French spirit" and its "vivid and suggestive" depictions of "Maquis figures". Boz also translated Jean Bruller's Le Silence de la mer, in his introduction discussing the choice between resistance and collaboration faced by wartime French writers.

In March 1946, he returned to Paris as a correspondent for the revived Adevărul, and for the dailies Finanțe și Industrie and L'Information Internationale, which would become an English-language weekly. At the same time, he occasionally wrote pieces for Le Monde and sent reports to Scandinavian papers. In 1947, Le Monde sent him on assignment to the famine-stricken areas of Romania; this would be his last visit to his native country. Because the Romanian newspapers who employed him disappeared with the advent of the Communist regime and his work for French newspapers and radio was only sporadic, he took a job at a Paris business. At the end of 1950 he decided to emigrate. Avoiding Soviet-occupied Romania, he briefly stayed in Genoa before arriving in Australia in February 1951, after a 35-day journey. His cousin Adolf Bleicher noted in 1979: "Lucian [had] the greatest luck, in that [the communists] never managed to capture him. All sorts of misfortunes plagued a cousin of his, also named Boz, who shared an address with Lucian's parents." First stopping in Canberra, Boz took on blue-collar jobs to support himself. He began as a factory welder, having taken a course on arc welding in France, but changed jobs after suffering an accident. Boz then moved to Sydney, where he opened a public relations firm with no employees. His only assistant was his wife, herself a devotee of literature and culture.

== Final decades ==
Thanks to his fluency in French and English, Boz was hired by Air France as the head of its Australian office, while his wife found work at the French embassy in Canberra. During his time in this position, he published hundreds of articles about France's aviation and aerospace industry in Australian newspapers and magazines. He visited Israel on several occasions after 1969, including a complete tour in 1970. He was a member of the Australian Journalists Association, and the newspapers that featured his work included The Daily Telegraph, The Sydney Morning Herald and The Australian. In 1958, he was made a knight of the Ordre du Mérite Commercial, while in 1979, he was conferred a knighthood in the National Order of Merit.

Because his commercial work kept him very busy, Boz had little time for cultural pursuits and could only read evenings and Sundays. However, after retiring in 1974, he resumed his engagement with literature, still displaying attachment toward his native land, organizing Australian conferences about Romanian culture, and publishing articles about Cioran and others. His frequent reviews of novels published during the interwar appeared as a book he edited himself in 1981, Anii literari '30. The book interested Romanian exile Mircea Eliade, a former participant on the literary scene described in Boz's book, who asked for a copy to be sent through his assistant, Mac Linscott Ricketts. Boz himself sent Anii literari '30 to literary colleagues in Communist Romania. He recalled having received positive messages from Ștefan Cazimir, Ovid Crohmălniceanu, Silvian Iosifescu, and Mircea Zaciu, but no reply at all from an older friend, Șerban Cioculescu. He also sent letters to his Romanian friends, both inside the country and in the anticommunist diaspora. Among the cultural figures with whom he carried on a correspondence were Cioran, Ionesco, Constantin Noica, Anton Dumitriu, and Nicolae Steinhardt. Noica at one point marveled at how good Boz's Romanian still was. By then, Boz had had a row with the exile publicist Ștefan Baciu, whose review Mele had hosted an antisemitic poem by César Tiempo.

In the late 1970s, Boz maintained a correspondence with Loewenstein-Lavi, by then a political exile, airing his various grievances against the previous decades of "communist terror". He attempted to familiarize himself with communist texts by Ludo, Benador and Sandu Lieblich, but concluded that these were in fact illegible. Although he never criticized national communism, and even privately only did so in 1992, in a letter to Arșavir Acterian (calling the Danube–Black Sea Canal "an ill-fated undertaking of the demented Ceaușescu"), publication of his work was still blocked by the authorities, who considered him a political émigré. Franța, 1938—1944 was kept in a secret archive by Romania's censorship apparatus. In 1971, a book by the young scholar Laurențiu Ulici cited profusely, and overall positively, from Boz's pronouncements about Eminescu and Ion Pillat; critic Mihai Drăgan, who covered the book for Cronica weekly, also noted that Boz had had "excellent results" in his Eminescu studies. The exile's name was occasionally referred to in other literary reviews, but sometimes with negative connotations: in December 1975, discussing essays by Henri Zalis, Dumitru Micu mentioned that Boz, like Zalis, had been "horrible" in his writing, a paragon of "vacuous metaphorizing". Constantin Trandafir was similarly dismissive: in a 1983 discussion about the prejudice of academic criticism, he suggested that any "study" ever produced by Boz was inferior to any regular newspaper column by his contemporary, Perpessicius.

In the 1980s, Boz made photocopies of some of his interwar work, sending them to friends and acquaintances. Asked by Ionel Jianu to supply details about Romanian artists living in Australia, Boz submitted information about four of them, all of whom appeared in Jianu's subsequent 1986 volume, Les artistes roumains en Occident. Emil Boldan and Constantin Crișan attempted to edit a volume of his essays, but the project came to nought. Nevertheless, several censored or self-censored articles about him did appear in the press, for instance a 1981 piece in Orizont by his friend Steinhardt, who knew the facts of the situation, that implied Boz left Romania for good in 1937. Following the Romanian Revolution of 1989, Boz worked with Jurnalul Literar between 1994 and 2002, publishing letters, memories and biographical sketches. He did similar work with Iosif Vulcan, the Romanian expatriate review in Cringila. In private correspondence, he was particularly indignant about Lucian Pintilie's film The Oak, lamenting its presentation of Romania as "a kind of barbarian, brutal, violent state".

In 2000, Boz published a short roman à clef, Piatra de încercare ("The Testing Bench"), which featured autofiction, with himself as the protagonist, as well as appearances made by his wife and their son Alain, by Cioran, and by Eliade. The plot unfolds in wartime France, with the title referring to the French civilian population and its response to occupation. The author died in Sydney in 2003. He had by then came to be included in literary reference volumes, and his work was analyzed by, among others, Crișan, Nicolae Tzone, Florin Manolescu, Andrei and Barbu Brezianu. His essays on Eminescu were republished by Constantin Cubleșan in the 2001 volume Eminescu în oglinzile criticii ("Eminescu's Critical Mirrors"). Samples of Boz's other work, reviewed by Tzone, saw print in Aldebaran review, and his correspondence was issued as a volume at Editura Dacia.
