= N. D. Cocea =

20th-century Romanian journalist and activist (1880 - 1949)

Nicolae Dumitru (N. D.) Cocea
- Late 1930s photograph of Cocea
- Born: November 29, 1880; Bârlad, Romania
- Died: February 1, 1949 (aged 68); Sighișoara
- Occupations: journalist, critic, novelist, politician, activist, lawyer
- Writing career
- Pen name: Nely
- Period: ca. 1898 – 1949
- Genres: satire, parody, essay, prose poetry, erotic literature, political novel, travel writing
- Movements: Symbolism, Naturalism, Modernism

N. D. Cocea (common rendition of Nicolae Dumitru Cocea, Romanian pronunciation: [nikoˈla.e duˈmitru ˈkot͡ʃe̯a], also known as Niculae, Niculici or Nicu Cocea; November 29, 1880 – February 1, 1949) was a Romanian journalist, novelist, critic and left-wing political activist, known as a major but controversial figure in the field of political satire. The founder of many newspapers and magazines, including Viața Socială, Rampa, Facla and Chemarea, collaborating with writer friends such as Tudor Arghezi, Gala Galaction and Ion Vinea, he fostered and directed the development of early modernist literature in Romania. Cocea later made his name as a republican and anticlerical agitator, was arrested as an instigator during the 1907 peasant revolt, and played a leading role in regrouping the scattered socialist clubs. His allegiances however switched between parties: during World War I, he supported the Entente Powers and, as a personal witness of the October Revolution, the government of Soviet Russia, before returning home as a communist.

During the interwar period, Cocea was elected to Romanian Parliament as an independent socialist, campaigned for the outlawed Romanian Communist Party, and found his press banned by the authorities on several occasions. In 1923, he was found guilty of lèse majesté. Cocea, although kept under constant surveillance, was rumored to have been an opportunistic double dealer, and his personal life was a matter of public scandal. His novels, the vast majority of which are samples of erotic literature, fueled innuendo about his sexual exploits, which also resulted in his sentencing for statutory rape. After World War II, Cocea was again close to the Communist Party and, from 1948, rose to prominence as an official writer for the communist regime.

For a while the son-in-law of journalist Constantin Mille, N. D. Cocea was from a theatrical family: his daughters Dina and Tantzi, like his sister Alice before them, were acclaimed actresses. Another daughter, Ioana-Maria Cocea, is a noted sculptor.

== Biography ==
=== Early years ===
Born in Bârlad, Cocea claimed lineage from the lesser boyar aristocracy of Moldavia. His father, Dumitru Cocea, was a Romanian Land Forces officer, who would reach the rank of General. The Coceas descended from an 18th-century Albanian Moldavian Serdar Gheorghe Cocea, but claimed lineage from a 16th-century soldier in the armies of Michael the Brave. Nicolae's mother, Cleopatra, was a published author and a journalist. She hailed from a family of yeomen (răzeși) or landowners, and her artistic education helped shape his cultural tastes from early childhood. Although he made his name as a writer and journalist, his most ardent wish was to become an actor.

Nicolae attended primary school in his native town, and had a hectic adolescence, determined by his father's successive postings. He is known to have first been enlisted at the National High School of Iași. During the late 1890s, young Cocea was in Bucharest, attending the Saint Sava National College, becoming close friends with two other students and future writers: one was Galaction, the other was Vasile Demetrius. Another Saint Sava student, Ion G. Duca (the Prime Minister of Romania in 1933), was occasionally present among them, but political differences drew them apart with time. Despite oral tradition, Arghezi, who joined the Cocea group around the same time, may not have been a Saint Sava student at all: according to literary historian C. Popescu-Cadem, there is no record of him ever attending that institution. Cocea's own education was vague. He flunked out after the 3rd and 7th grades, was transferred to Ploiești, then returned to Saint Sava only to pass reexamination.

Cocea and his Saint Sava friends were already leftists who attended the public lectures of senior socialist leader Constantin Dobrogeanu-Gherea. According to literary historian Tudor Vianu, the four youths, including the "restless, daring and ingenious" Cocea, were mounting an independent protest against "bourgeois" values. They literary taste favored Symbolism, Parnassianism and literary naturalism, which they saw as modern shields against traditionalist culture. Inspired by the works of Charles Baudelaire, they soon joined efforts with the Romanian Symbolist movement. All members of the group visited with the Symbolist doyen Alexandru Macedonski, although Cocea the writer was first discovered by Symbolist academic Ovid Densusianu and his Vieața Nouă review.

As his personal note, Cocea rebelled against paternal and institutional authority. Under the pen name Nely, he published the defiantly erotic novel Poet-Poetă (1898, with a preface by Galaction), that resulted in his near-definitive expulsion from public high school. Around the same time, Galaction married Cocea's cousin Zoe Marcou, a laicized Romanian Orthodox nun; she would inspire him to become an Orthodox priest.

Around 1900, Cocea, who had already graduated in Romanian Law, was in France, undergoing specialization at the University of Paris. At this stage in life, he was probably acquainted with the French roots of Romanian radical liberalism, which infused his left-wing outlook. A sympathizer of the Dreyfusards, he was also becoming interested in the various projects to transform the Kingdom of Romania into a republic, in marked contrast to his father's ardent monarchism. He witnessed first-hand the progress of trade unionism in France, and had personal interviews with writer Anatole France and sculptor Auguste Rodin. The family's French connections were preserved by the writer's siblings. Cocea's sister Alice, the future comedian, was born in Sinaia, where Dumitru Cocea was stationed in 1899, and also settled in France at a later date. She was joined there by Cocea's younger sister, Florica.

Upon his return to Romania, Cocea was for a while employed as justice of the peace, but was later virtually inactive as a lawyer. Instead, he began frequenting the Romanian socialist milieu. He was at the time married to Florica Mille, daughter of Constantin Mille. Her father was founder of Adevărul daily and co-founder of the Social-Democratic Workers' Party (PSDMR). This was another break with the Cocea family tradition: allegedly, General Dumitru Cocea had once ordered his troops to devastate the Adevărul offices.

Florica was born from Mille's first marriage, which ended in divorce, and had a sister, Margareta, married into the Messerschmitt family of German industrialists. Through Mille, Cocea became related to another Moldavian boyar family, the Tăutus. Cocea's marriage, which resulted in the 1912 birth of Dina Cocea, was troubled and ended in divorce.

=== Socialist clubs and 1907 revolt ===
Like some of the veteran socialists (Garabet Ibrăileanu, Henric Sanielevici, the România Muncitoare group), the young journalist made repeated attempts to revive and reunite the socialist clubs, left in disarray by the 1899 dissolution of the PSDMR. Cocea, with Arghezi, Demetrius and Galaction, stood out for marrying this political ideal with the artistic credo of Symbolism. This unusual vision was preserved in the magazine the three published together during 1904, Linia Dreaptă ("The Straight Line"). In 1905, Arghezi left for Switzerland and entrusted Cocea with his collection of rare books. Cocea is said to have lost it, an event which marked the first of several disagreements between them.

With the March 1907 peasant uprising, N. D. Cocea's profile in political journalism was boosted. He is the probable source of a much circulated canard, taken up by Adevărul, according to which Romanian authorities had killed 11,000 or more peasant insurgents. Cocea himself eventually settled for a death toll of 12,000, claiming that, "had the peasants' bodies been lined up and down on Calea Victoriei", Romanian King Carol I of Hohenzollern could have walked over to Dealul Mitropoliei "on a soft rug of peasant flesh".

During the actual events, N. D. Cocea was mainly active on the lower course of the Danube, recognized by other socialists as "one of the leaders of the [workers'] movement" in Brăila. His regional daily, Dezrobirea ("The Emancipation"), was probably paid for by a local banker, Alphonse (or Alfons) Nachtigal. Drawing official suspicion as a republican paper, it became noted for fueling revolt regionally. After the România Muncitoare circle organized a socialist rally in Brăila, Dezrobirea's entire staff was arrested on orders from Prefect Nicolae T. Faranga, who also confiscated most of the printed issues (although some 1,000 were still freely distributed among the intrigued peasants). Cocea was eventually tried as an instigator, and sentenced to a term in prison.

Upon his release, Cocea moved back to Bucharest, where he became a socialist orator, a România Muncitoare editor, and a correspondent of the workers' journal Viitorul Social. He was one of the Romanian delegates to the International Socialist Congress, hosted by the Second International in Stuttgart. It was there that Russian socialist opinion leader Vladimir Lenin publicized a thesis according to which the Romanian revolt and the Russian Revolution of 1905 were similar, in both character and impact. Back in Romania, Cocea was resuming his contacts with Dobrogeanu-Gherea, who was by then all but withdrawn from active socialist politics. As Cocea later wrote, the veteran leader confessed to him that he was being brought down by acute insomnia.

The young activist was blending his socialism with a critic's interest in modern art and experimental literature. Literary historian Paul Cernat argues that, like Symbolist poet N. Davidescu, Cocea spent the 1900–1920 period disseminating modernist literature "on all fronts". He made his name as an art critic by 1908, when, like Arghezi, he defended the Romanian post-Impressionist art club, whose members were being marginalized by the Tinerimea Artistică society; he also saluted Iosif Iser's international post-Impressionist exhibit. Within a series of articles in Pagini Libere journal, Cocea also explained his divorce with Symbolism and Art Nouveau, concluding that they represented "the cosmopolitan class of sloth and of universal parasitism". The following year, Cocea was assigned the art column of Noua Revistă Română, an eclectic journal put out by Romanian thinker Constantin Rădulescu-Motru. While there, he militated in favor of modernized art, urging artists to destroy "antiquated artistic formulas" and to subvert "the laws of nature".

=== Viața Socială ===
According to Cocea's future friend and foe Pamfil Șeicaru, 1910 was the time year Cocea, with Christian Rakovsky, Ecaterina Arbore, I. C. Frimu and Ilie Moscovici, was in the "chief of staff" of the newly created Social Democratic Party of Romania. Cocea was additionally a member of the party's Social Studies Circle, furnishing its library and organizing its Kalinderu Church offices.

In February 1910, Cocea and Arghezi set up a new periodical, Viața Socială. The magazine, which received contributions from Dobrogeanu-Gherea, militated for universal suffrage, social equality and land reform, while informing readers about world socialism. It enlisted collaborations from a number of anti-establishment journalists, from agrarian militant Vasile Kogălniceanu and socialist physician Tatiana Grigorovici to writers Ion Minulescu, Lucia Demetrius or Constantin Graur, and republished contributions from some of Europe's known social critics: Eduard Bernstein, Rinaldo Rigola, Vsevolod Garshin, Leo Tolstoy, Jean Jaurès, Emile Vandervelde, Hubert Lagardelle and Gustave Hervé. Other contributors were Arbore, Davidescu, V. Demetrius, Traian Demetrescu, Sofia Nădejde, Vasile Savel and Avram Steuerman-Rodion.

Culturally, this moment saw Cocea and his friends coordinating the transition from Symbolism to the early 20th-century avant-garde. This move was also accelerated by art critic Theodor Cornel, who was for while a staff writer for Cocea's publication. In his first Viața Socială editorial, Cocea himself deemed Arghezi "the most revolutionary poet" of the period. However, his unilateral decision to publish Arghezi's "Evening Prayer", as an example of poetic rebellion, greatly enraged the expatriated author. They resumed their friendship only after Arghezi returned from his Swiss sojourn, and Cocea, with Galaction, Dumitru Karnabatt and various others, frequented the salon formed in Arghezi's Bucharest home. Cocea was also witness when Arghezi wedded his long-term lover, Constanța Zissu (December 1912); the register describes him as "a journalist by profession, living at Polonă Street, 1."

Through Galaction's interventions, Viața Socială maintained links with the more mainstream and home-grown current on Romania's leftist scene, Poporanism, as well as with the post-socialist magazine of Iași, Viața Românească. It also published several poems by the young Poporanist George Topîrceanu. Also in Iași, the Viața Socială circle acquired a number of young disciples, involved in editing Fronda and Absolutio magazines: Isac Ludo, Eugen Relgis etc.

Still, traditionalist critic Ilarie Chendi notes, Viața Socială as a whole failed, because the Symbolist and post-Symbolist contributors were not ardent socialists, and because no "notable poets or prose writers" could be found among the socialists. The same was observed in 1913 by critic Gheorghe Savul, who suggested that Viața Socială took on Symbolists such as Davidescu for opportunistic reasons, since they also had an anti-bourgeois axe to grind, but that there was little else to unite its contributors.

Cocea was by then frequenting the anarchist boyar Alexandru Bogdan-Pitești, an art patron, cultural innovator and personal friend of Arghezi. In 1911, he visited Italy together with Lagardelle, the French Syndicalist militant, and personally met with liberal theorists Benedetto Croce and Guglielmo Ferrero, as well as with Syndicalist Arturo Labriola and fellow journalist Giuseppe Prezzolini. His travel account, which includes essays on art and civilization, was published the same year, as Spre Roma ("Toward Rome").

=== Rampa and Facla (first edition) ===
Back in Romania, Cocea launched Rampa, a theatrical review originally published as a daily. His partner in this venture was a veteran of theatrical life, Alexandru Davila. Cocea also set up the independent socialist newspaper Facla. The latter, identified as Romania's first socialist and satirical magazine by Arghezi himself, was soon joined by the 18-year-old poet Ion Vinea, as literary columnist and campaigner for post-Symbolist literature, with painters Iser and Camil Ressu as illustrators. The other noted contributors to Cocea's publications were Toma Dragu, Saniel Grossman, George Diamandy, Camil Petrescu and avant-garde critic Poldi Chapier, whose 1912 article for Rampa chronicled the international success of Futurism. Also featured were poems and translations by the post-Symbolist H. Bonciu. Cocea's own contributions include the chronicle of a play by Henry Bataille and a salute to the "invincible spirit" of the Portuguese republican revolution.

Alongside renewed attacks on Romania's cultural traditionalism, Cocea and Arghezi initiated a lengthy campaign in favor of universal suffrage. Their articles and headlines were often sensationalist and provoking, again focusing on Carol I, Romania's aging King. They often referred to the monarch as Ploșnița ("The Tick"), Gheșeftarul ("The Shop-Keeper") or Neamțul ("The Kraut"). Facla, with media support from Adevărul and the Romanian anarchist milieus, was taunting the authorities by staging its own mock trial for lèse majesté. Facla's anticlericalism, specifically aimed at the Orthodox Church, formed part of a larger scandal, which had earlier seen Arghezi giving up his hierodeacon's frock. The ardent antimilitarism of Cocea's Facla articles, in particular his mockery of General Grigore C. Crăiniceanu and his sons, had similar results: the journalist was handed a preemptive and dishonorable military discharge.

Culturally, Facla was a leading adversary of traditionalist literature and of the nationalist periodicals which supported it. Its attack was concentrated on Drum Drept and Convorbiri Critice magazines (the focus of Vinea's articles) and on antisemitic historian Nicolae Iorga, who had earlier dismissed Facla as a venue for Jewish Romanian interests. Facla also inaugurated the conflict between Cocea and the Viața Românească Poporanists. As a socialist, Cocea attacked the Poporanists for supporting artistic nationalism, and then for courting the mainstream National Liberal Party.

Cocea unsuccessfully presented himself as a Social Democratic candidate in the elections of 1912, the first ones in Romania to be contested by an independent socialist party. However, he soon broke off from the party, and came to be considered a representative of the "bourgeois press" by his former socialist colleagues. One of them, Constantin Titel Petrescu, informs that Cocea "could not live by the party discipline".

=== World War I, October Revolution and Chemarea ===
At an early stage in World War I, public opinion in neutral Romania was divided between the Entente Powers and the Central Powers, both of which held Romanian irredenta. In this context, the Francophile Cocea manifested himself as an outspoken partisan of Romania's alliance with the Entente. There followed a split between Cocea and his erstwhile partners Arghezi, Galaction and Bogdan-Pitești. The latter three were committed Germanophiles who proceeded to publish their own review, Cronica. Chemarea, a mainly political magazine published by Ion Vinea in 1915, stood between the two groups, but was probably managed by Cocea, who allegedly came up with its name (lit. "the calling"). Cocea's friendship with Arghezi had again soured to the point of mutual hatred. In Facla, Cocea made thinly veiled comments about the poet's mother, an unmarried woman, and suggested that the Cronica staff "still lives on the morsels left over from Bogdan-Pitești's feasts".

When the 1916–17 Campaign turned into a defensive war, N. D. Cocea joined the government and Land Forces on their retreat to Western Moldavia. Reunited with Vinea, he helped publish a daily named Deșteptarea ("The Awakening"), flirting with the Germanophiles and Zimmerwald neutralists, hotly criticizing the Ententist and National Liberal establishment. However, he remained an outspoken critic of those public figures whom he perceived as German hirelings, including politician Alexandru Marghiloman and Arena newspaperman Alfred Hefter-Hidalgo. As was later acknowledged by Vinea, Cocea and his Deșteptarea colleagues had formed a conspiratorial "revolutionary republican committee". Both of them were also affiliated with a wing of the Romanian Freemasonry.

A while after, Cocea made his way in the Russian Republic, Romania's Entente ally, and settled in Petrograd. His activities there included putting out the French-language magazine, L'Entente ("The Entente"), which was financed by his old rivals, the Romanian National Liberals. As a resident of Hotel Astoria, he witnessed first-hand the October Revolution, and became a passionate supporter of the Bolshevik cause. He later claimed to have been present, on Revolution day, in the Petrograd Soviet hall, hearing the victorious speech of Bolshevik leader Vladimir Lenin, and to have later attended the second All-Russian Congress of Soviets. As a representative of the International Association for Information of the Labor Press of America, France, and Great Britain, Cocea exchanged notes with Lenin. He interviewed Lenin about the Bolsheviks' goals, assuring him that his replies would be published verbatim.

By the end of the year, Cocea had returned to Moldavia. Under his direction (December 1917 to February 1918), Deșteptarea became a new edition of Chemarea. It was often issued with large blank spaces, showing interventions by military censors. The gazette managed to publish a letter of protest, signed by poet Benjamin Fondane, expressing a hope that Arghezi would not be prosecuted as a traitor. After advertising its "radical socialist" agenda, Chemarea was promptly shut down by the Alexandru Averescu cabinet. For this and other reasons, Cocea would later refer to Averescu as the organizer of "White Terror" in Romania.

Cocea was a strong critic of Romania's separate armistice with Germany, and consequently listed as a persona non grata by the Central Powers. In August 1918, he launched Depeșa ("The Dispatch"), later published as a third edition of Chemarea. A new presence on these two periodicals was writer Jacques G. Costin, who produced several political pieces (including a renewed denunciation of Hefter-Hidalgo) and later the musical chronicle. Its other staff writers were young men who later built career in the political press, both left- and right-wing: Vinea, Demostene Botez, Alexandru Busuioceanu, Cezar Petrescu, Pamfil Șeicaru and Adrian Maniu. They took care of the newspaper when Cocea left Iași on a short visit to Bessarabia, a former Russian province that was in the process of uniting with Romania.

Victorious in its lengthy conflict with Hefter's Arena, Chemarea eventually relocated to Bucharest, but suffered from the nationwide paper shortage. Cocea supported the Socialist Party of Romania (PS) through the leftist riots of December 1918, and, when the PS leadership was arrested, sat on the defense team, alongside Mille and Dragu.

Chemarea survived until November 1, 1919—when its lampoon of Romanian King Ferdinand I prompted the intervention of military censors. On November 2, shortly before the general election day, Cocea profited from the temporary suspension of censorship to reissue the same paper, subsequently renamed Chemarea Roșie ("The Red Call"), then Facla, Torța ("The Torch"), Clopotul ("The Bell") and again Chemarea (changes which were supposed to keep censors always a step behind Cocea). These publications were attempts to revive and radicalize the socialist literary press, that had virtually succumbed in Romania after the demise of Facla's first edition. A Marxist literary critic, Ovid Crohmălniceanu, proposes that Cocea's renewed offensive missed the mark, lacking "a clear enough vision".

=== Parliamentary mandate ===
Cocea was elected to the Lower Chamber during the race of November 1919 (reelected during the race of May 1920). He represented a non-partisan electoral list for Bucharest (the Citizen's List), whose other two candidates, physician Nicolae L. Lupu and lawyer Constantin Costa-Foru, also won seats. Although officially an independent, he rallied with the PS in the chamber minority group led by Gheorghe Cristescu and Ilie Moscovici. Cocea's mandate was immediately contested by his National Liberal adversaries. They sought to invalidate his candidature, citing a law which prevented those with a military discharge from running in elections. The National Liberal motion was however defeated when Cocea, who presented himself as a political victim, earned unexpected support from the Romanian National Party and the Democratic Nationalist Party.

In opposition to the People's Party and the anti-communist consensus, Cocea spoke positively in Parliament about Soviet Russia, arguing that the Bolshevik foreign policy had saved the whole of civilization, and citing favorable statements made by the returning war prisoners. His theory was that the Comintern was a legitimate successor of the First International. The notion was contested by another socialist deputy, Dragu—early signs of a schism between the Cominternist socialist-communists and those who followed the Vienna International. In one of his addresses to the Chamber (July 28, 1920), Cocea presented a vision of socialism that was neither "unilateral" nor "narrow", but suited to the needs of "all peoples and all times", and quoted from The Internationale. Cocea's rhetoric, equating the October Revolution with the birth of Christ and glorifying the Slavic soul, was ridiculed from the benches as "Russian mysticism".

For a while, Cocea's sympathy turned toward the rising Peasants' Party. This Poporanist group, which reacted against National Liberal politics and sought peace with the socialists and the Soviets, was called "civilized and Westernized" by the socialist journalist. Nevertheless, Cocea was becoming disappointed by the parliamentary system of Greater Romania. He argued that Parliament itself should be replaced with a technocratic body, elected by a radical form of universal suffrage, and clamored his belief that "in short while, [...] Romania will be socialist."

In August 1920, Cocea voted in favor of Grigore Trancu-Iași's labor law, although he found it unsatisfactory—his stated belief was that the law's inequities would spark a "social revolution". There followed the October 1920 general strike, that was condoned and supported by Cocea and the writers at Chemarea. During December, following a state of siege, Cocea and Lupu were behind parliamentary efforts to investigate the alleged murder of socialist activist Herșcu Aroneanu by People's Party authorities.

When, in early 1921, Cristescu and the other socialist-communists set up the Romanian Communist Party (PCR), Cocea became an outside sympathizer of their cause, protesting against their imprisonment and prosecution in the Dealul Spirii Trial. In May and June of that year, when chamber was assessing the case of Moscovici's seat, left vacant by his sentencing after the strike, Cocea asked for it to be filled by Constantin Popovici; Popovici, next on the electoral list, was himself under arrest. His speech about "government terror" ended in a heated dispute with People's Party deputies Berlescu (whom Cocea called a descendant of Romani slaves) and Alexandru Oteteleșeanu. Shortly before the 1921 election, Cocea labeled Conservative-Democratic leader Take Ionescu, the Prime Minister-designate, as a pawn of King Ferdinand and his "camarilla". Early in 1922, Cocea also joined Dem. I. Dobrescu and other lawyers on the Dealul Spirii Trial defense team.

=== Facla revival and 1923 trial ===
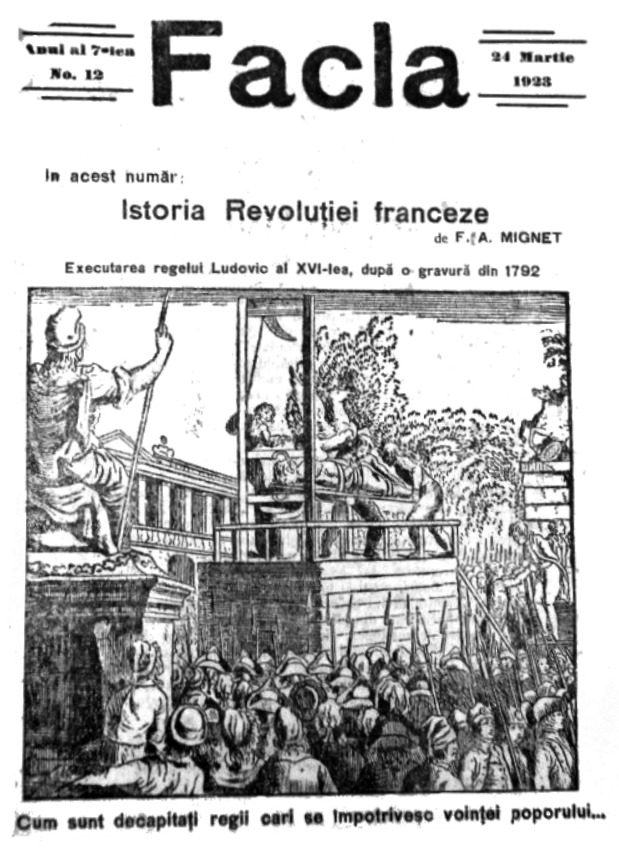
Facla of March 24, 1923, published with the warning Cum sunt decapitați regii cari se împotrivesc voinței poporului... ("How they decapitate kings who oppose the people's wishes...") alongside the execution of Louis XVI

In 1920, Chemarea came to its end, and Cocea began putting out another edition of Facla weekly. The newspaper acquired offices in the Frascatti Hotel (later the "Savoy" branch of Constantin Tănase Revue Theater), redecorated by artist Marcel Janco. According to political scientist Stelian Tănase, this enterprise was secretly financed by Soviet Russia as external agitprop: notes kept by Siguranța Statului intelligence agency suggest that Cocea was a regular guest at the Russian mission in Romania.

Cocea's disciple, Ion Vinea, went on to publish the magazine Contimporanul, originally as a socialist tribune, but later as a modernist forum. Cocea was an occasional contributor to this venue, but was separated from its avant-garde staff writers, having a less rebellious writing style and a more structured political vision. In exchange, Vinea was an occasional contributor to Facla, whenever Contimporanul met financial difficulties; he was also the editorial director from 1925 to 1926 (the year when Facla again closed down). Vinea's own political articles were noted for their critique of National Liberal policies, portraying liberal Romania as a Brătianu family dictatorship and campaigning in favor of the socialist groups. Around 1924, the Facla group was also joined by "Red Prince" Scarlat Callimachi, a modernist promoter and communist militant, by aspiring critic Șerban Cioculescu, and by the Zionist opinion maker A. A. Luca. Cocea was at the time the animator of cultural debates at Terasa Oteteleșanu, where he introduced the young novelist and journalist I. Peltz.

The early 1920s also witnessed N. D. Cocea's involvement in various other civic and cultural campaigns. He became, in 1922, a member of the Romanian Friends of Nature, a socialist-inspired environmental organization, and, the following year, joined Dem I. Dobrescu in creating the League for Human Rights. He was among the regular guests at International Red Aid "literary tea parties", described by historian Adrian Cioroianu as "one of those schemes the communists employed in collecting money for their comrades in prison". With Fondane, director Armand Pascal and various others, Cocea also participated in creating Insula, an actors' working group. It was supposed to revolutionize Romanian theater, but disappeared after only a few months of existence (February 1923). Cocea compensated by giving moral support to the Jewish modernist Vilna Troupe, which relocated to Bucharest in 1924. Also that year Cocea published a new book, Ignoranță ("Ignorance").

After the adoption by a National Liberal legislature of Romania's 1923 Constitution, Cocea joined up with the angrier ranks of political opposition. He soon publicized a claim that King Ferdinand and his favorite minister, Brătianu, had together given legal foundations to a plutocracy. He was taken to court and lost, being sentenced for lèse majesté. Reputedly, the authorities also confiscated samples of Cocea's anticlerical fiction works, but these were recovered and published by Contimporanul in 1925. Through the voice of Vinea, Contimporanul also protested the sentencing, claiming that Cocea was a persecuted man, his career "a spectacle of modern dramatism". The trial attracted significant attention among the Romanian youth, which divided itself into monarchists and republicans.

Cocea's conduct was the topic of controversy throughout the early 1920s: in 1922, Cocea's influential modernist rival, the literary theorist Eugen Lovinescu, bitterly attacked him, Arghezi and Bogdan-Pitești for their wartime conduct. Noted for its xenophobic attacks on Contimporanul's editors, the nationalist review Țara Noastră openly celebrated Cocea's arrest. An unsigned note in that paper announced that Cocea had been imprisoned "for the least of his crimes", and called to mind that Cocea had been lampooning its editor, Octavian Goga. The antisemitic publicist Alexandru Hodoș designated Cocea's supporters at Adevărul and Cuvântul Liber with the title of "Shabbos goyim", describing Cocea as a habitual prankster, a renegade of the socialist cause, and a dishonorable man.

Cocea served his sentence of one year and a half at Craiova penitentiary, and paid the 10,000 lei fine. He was afterward involved in communist agitation, speaking at PCR rallies in Câmpina (1925), Soroca and Otaci (during the electoral campaign of 1931). The PCR underground's leaders were often Cocea's guests at Frascatti. His modernist supporters did not follow his lead. By 1929, Vinea and Contimporanul were toning down their own socialist agenda, cooperating instead with the moderate National Peasants' Party, and even drawing suspicion from the left that they had become sympathetic to fascism. Generally a critic of the National Peasantists, Cocea quit a resurfacing Facla in 1930, leaving Vinea in charge (the latter was editor of that newspaper until its 1940 disestablishment).

=== 1930s novels and Era Nouă ===
Over the next few years, N. D. Cocea is believed to have been largely inactive in the political press. Instead, he made his return to fiction. In 1931, his novel Vinul de viață lungă ("The Wine of a Long Life") was released under contract with Editura Cultura Națională. Its received much acclaim, unmatched by Cocea's later works in the genre, which critics often found unpalatable for their erotic content. Cocea's erotic series includes: Fecior de slugă ("The Son of the Servant"), published in 1933 by Cultura Națională; Pentr-un petec de negreață ("Over a Black Patch", also known as Andrei Vaia), 1934, Alcaly Publishers; and Nea Nae ("Uncle Nae"), 1935, Alcaly.

During that interval, Cocea was again brought into custody. He was tried and imprisoned for statutory rape, having eloped with the 16-year-old Gina, orphaned daughter of the wealthy National Liberal politico Ion Manolescu-Strunga. The liberties he took in public life, and the provoking nature of his writings, resulted in other disputes with the nationalists, forming part of their larger conservative crusade against "pornography" and the avant-garde. The traditionalist periodical Neamul Românesc, put out by Nicolae Iorga, had "Cocea Niculae" on its blacklist, as the third most offensive Romanian author (the avant-garde authors H. Bonciu and Geo Bogza were at No. 1 and No. 2 respectively). In parallel, Cocea was becoming involved in a publicized controversy with his wartime colleague Pamfil Șeicaru. As commentators have since noted, the two journalists were equally vulgar, but Șeicaru had been enlisted by the nationalists and the traditionalists.

In 1934, Cocea joined a group known as Amicii URSS, formed on the basis of a PCR initiative and formally seeking to normalize Romania's relations with the Soviet Union. In November of that year, Siguranța Statului was reporting that Cocea and Callimachi, together with Petre Constantinescu-Iași, were going to establish in Bucharest a "far left platform" with a "pronounced Semitic tendency"; known as Ideea Socială ("The Social Idea"), it was supposedly part of the Adevărul-Dimineața network. The period also brought Cocea's brief and uneventful marriage with Lila Stănescu. She was in reality the lover of PCR activist Ion Gheorghe Maurer, whom the journalist continued to view as his friend.

In 1936, the year when he married his long-time lover Gina Manolescu-Strunga, Cocea again returned to the forefront of Romania's left-wing press, launching the theoretical magazine Era Nouă ("New Era"). Also a front for the PCR, replacing the banned Bluze Albastre of communist writer Alexandru Sahia, Era Nouă was itself shut down by the authorities in 1937. It had published only two issues. In one of its internal memos, Siguranța Statului reviewed the first of these as inoffensively "academic", the second as "agitatorial". Siguranța agents also noted that Cocea, with Dobrescu and Callimachi, was making efforts to assist the PCR activists tried in Chișinău, and trying to obtain further support from the left-wing National Peasantists (Virgil Madgearu, Grigore Iunian).

Era Nouă's main contributors were young communist essayists such as Sahia, Miron Radu Paraschivescu, Ștefan Voicu and Silvian Iosifescu, but the magazine also published avant-garde authors with Marxist sensibilities: Ion Călugăru, Stephan Roll, Virgil Teodorescu, Dolfi Trost and Paul Păun. They were joined by communist polemicists Ghiță Ionescu and Belu Zilber. In its first issue, Era Nouă prophesied that the general crisis of capitalism was evident in the rapid decay of "its culture and ideology", leaving the proletariat in a position to reinterpret mainstream culture "on the large basis offered by dialectical materialism". According to cultural historian Zigu Ornea, such pronouncements, soon taken up by the entire communist press, were in reality a form of left-wing totalitarianism, and therefore equivalent to the internal logic of fascism.

=== Reporter magazine and tensions with the PCR ===
Cocea was reputedly pondering the relaunch of Chemarea as a communist newspaper, supposedly with Ștefan Foriș, the ex-convict head of PCR Agitprop, as its manager, and Paraschivescu, Voicu, as well as other Communist Youth activists, as co-editors. Siguranța men had it that Cocea shocked his communist partners by informing them that Chemarea was to be a "centrist" platform, with no known communist on its staff. However, the senior socialist remained active in proximity to the PCR over the next year. In May 1937, he caught Siguranța's attention as a would-be collaborator to Callimachi's anti-fascist review Munca ("The Labor"). Making overtures toward the National Peasantist left-wingers, Munca also received contributions from poets Mihail Cruceanu and Sandu Tudor, from sociologist Mihai Ralea and journalist Tudor Teodorescu-Braniște, and from writer-director Sandu Eliad. In summer 1937, the moderate left-wing Azi daily published Cocea's renewed criticism of censorship, part of a series of a collective reply to the far right's moralistic discourse.

Cocea was again mandated by the PCR to lead Reporter weekly, beginning with its November 1937 issue. The periodical, already in existence for five years, was making efforts to reach the apolitical public. In an editorial for Reporter, Cocea made comments similar to the Era Nouă program, with a more pronounced satirical tone and allusions to fascism: "however massive the stupidity of dictatorial rules, man's intelligence, honesty in convictions [and] the fervor of the masses will in the end topple them. [...] The greedy satraps, the leeward adventurers have come to tumble down, one on top of the other."

Reporter's agenda was generically anti-fascist: campaigning for the Republican side in the Spanish Civil War, it lampooned Benito Mussolini and Adolf Hitler, and repeatedly attacked the Iron Guard or other Romanian fascist groups. Its political panelists included, alongside Voicu, Paraschivescu and Călugăru, the future communist historian Ion Popescu-Puțuri, reporter Aurel Baranga, and anti-fascist poet Gherasim Luca. Other members of the Reporter circle, whose contacts with Cocea were closely investigated by the authorities, included a diverse gathering of PCR figures: Foriș, Trost, Marxist sociologist Lucrețiu Pătrășcanu, unionist Ilie Pintilie and the Bessarabian poet Emilian Bucov. Reporter also published the militant poems of Demostene Botez, Liviu Deleanu and Al. Șahighian, and samples of international left-leaning literature (Ilya Ehrenburg, André Malraux, Nikolai Ostrovsky). The maverick dramatist Mihail Sebastian was, for a while, Reporter's literary chronicler.

Only two months after Cocea took over, Reporter was banned by state censorship, suspected of "communist tendencies" and of publishing "alarmist articles." The sincerity of Cocea's political credo was by then coming into question: the maverick communist Petre Pandrea alleged that Cocea was infiltrated into the party ranks by Siguranța Statului. Stelian Tănase also describes Cocea as a double agent, notoriously close to Siguranța director Mihail Moruzov (his Bucharest neighbor), trafficking in information from the communist movement and the court of Carol II, but still advising PCR Agitprop. Cocea was nevertheless being closely watched by the Siguranța Detective Corps. It kept notes on his meetings with French press correspondents, with Spanish Republican diplomats and with disgraced Jewish Romanian journalists such as Jacques G. Costin. According to these documents, Cocea discussed political matters with the opponents of Carol II, including National Peasantist Iuliu Maniu and communist sympathizer Petru Groza. He is known to have had great sympathy for Maniu, despite their political differences.

=== World War II ===
A 1939 entry in Cocea's own diary admits that the "unexpected" Non-Aggression Treaty between the Soviets and Nazi Germany was the source of "doubting" and "bitterness" among left-wing Romanians, but scolds his old friend Nicolae L. Lupu for having then lost faith in socialism. At times, he was openly critical of Joseph Stalin and his personality cult, writing about the "sickening smoke of official Soviet incense", and joking about the various feats attributed to Stalin. In contrast to his earlier political stances, Cocea was, by 1938, a member of the National Liberal Party, probably because a new wave of repression had led the PCR to implode. He was registered with the National Liberals until after Carol II's National Renaissance Front dictatorship pushed them into semi-clandestinity, and still enjoyed a privileged relationship with them during World War II.

Cocea was inactive during the war, when Romania was allied with the Axis powers and under a succession of dictatorial regimes. Around 1939, he was separated from his wife Gina, following a series of disagreements in the family. Inhabiting a private villa in the Transylvanian town of Sighișoara, he kept diaries which offer insight into his various political dealings. During the Winter War, he sided with the Soviet Union, noting that Stalin had pragmatic grounds for wanting to secure his borders. However, he viewed Soviet provocations as "redolent of Nazism", and concluded that the war would impose new "problems of conscience" on all "good-faith people." The fascist National Legionary regime continued to keep track on Cocea's movements during 1940, alarmed by rumors that he had been operating a clandestine printing press, but was unable to determine whether he was still a communist. Cocea's actress sister Alice, who was living in Nazi-occupied France, was taking a different path: she and her manager, Robert Capgras, had a friendly relationship with the Germans and were later deemed collaborators with the enemy.

From 1941, the Nazi-aligned regime of Conducător Ion Antonescu ordered Romania's participation in the war against the Soviet Union. Cocea was active in the informal opposition to Antonescu, approaching his old friends in the mainstream political parties. As early as January 1942, Cocea met with the National Peasantist leadership, probing its attitude toward the Soviet Union and the Romanian communists. Like them, Cocea was positively impressed that the PCR was turning into a "patriotic" party and going back on its pro-German stance. Around 1944, Cocea resumed contacts with the since-revived PCR. In June, Siguranța reported that he was rounding up support for communist sympathizer Mihai Ralea and his underground Socialist Peasants' Party. He later served as the communists' liaison with the National Liberal Party wing of Gheorghe Tătărescu (later, the National Liberal Party-Tătărescu). Cocea's intervention contributed to a strategic alliance between the communists and the various other parties, within a coalition which overthrew Antonescu (see King Michael's Coup).

=== Communist honors ===
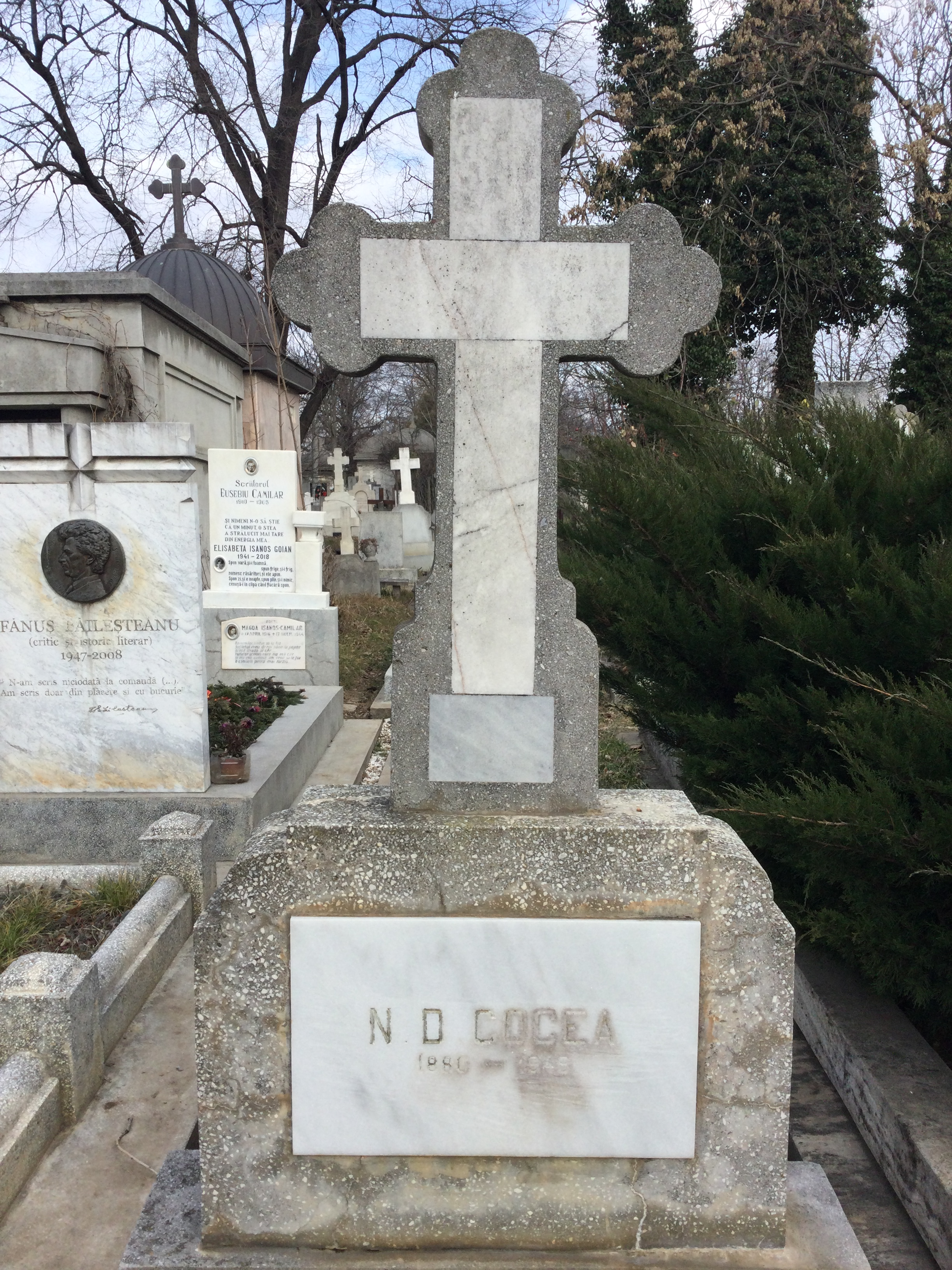
Grave at Bellu Cemetery

In September 1944, Cocea was elected vice president of the Romanian Writers' Society, which was in the process of expelling writers associated with the wartime regimes. He personally proposed for some 50 "valuable writers", from Maria Banuș and Ury Benador to Radu Tudoran and Gheorghe Zane, including many of his left-wing friends, to be admitted into the Society (only 20 of them were eventually received). The following month, he participated with Callimachi in the creation of a formally unified Journalists' Trade Union. Split between PCR and National Peasantist lobbies, it was created around the conjectural goal of purging the Romanian press of fascist influences. The Union was originally presided by a Committee comprising Cocea, Callimachi, Nicolae Carandino, Miron Constantinescu, George Ivașcu, Eugen Jebeleanu, Octav Livezeanu, George Macovescu, Nicolae Moraru, Ion Pas, Grigore Preoteasa, Tudor Teodorescu-Braniște, Alfons Vogel and several others. In May 1945, Cocea represented the Writers' Society at the funeral of his Reporter colleague Mihail Sebastian, who had been killed in a road accident.

The Romanian Society for Friendship with the Soviet Union (ARLUS), which offered a good reception to Soviet occupation forces, counted N. D. and Dina Cocea among its earliest members (although they were probably not among its founders); in December 1944, father and daughter were co-opted on the ARLUS Leadership Committee. The ARLUS Press Section, headed by Teodorescu-Braniște, had Cocea as one of its first vice presidents, serving alongside Ion Pas. Around 1946, Cocea approached Arghezi with a PCR offer to become a paid communist writer. According to his own classified report for the party, he was unable to persuade his former friend to join him in this cause. Cocea's various efforts still earned praise from official poet Mihai Beniuc, who included his colleague among the writers most active in disseminating communist principles after August 1944. According to Tănase, Cocea "offered himself to the Soviet occupier, with the same amoralism and cynicism that have been following him through life."

Between 1944 and 1946, Cocea was also editor and publisher of Victoria ("Victory") daily. Although nominally independent, this paper was a tribune for the PCR, supporting the policies of communization, and popularizing Stalinism. It fostered a new generation of journalists and activists, among them Vera Călin, B. Elvin, George Mărgărit and Marius Mircu. Other Victoria contributors, including Iosifescu, Constantin Balmuș, the avant-garde writers Radu Boureanu and Geo Dumitrescu, wrote articles which condemned the various traditional seats of learning and the Romanian Academy, as "reactionary", while naming the senior far right supporters in culture (from Ioan Alexandru Brătescu-Voinești and D. Caracostea to P. P. Panaitescu and Ion Petrovici).

On March 31, 1945, Cocea replaced the disgraced Carandino as inspector-general of the Romanian theaters, and began introducing communist censorship. In September 1947, a few months before the Romanian communist regime officially took over, Cocea was reelected to the Writers' Society Leadership Committee. Together with Ion Pas, the Minister of Arts, he introduced legislation that severely curtailed the Romanian dramatic repertoire. It was largely impractical, causing an uproar in the theatrical community, and leading to Cocea's demotion in December 1947.

On January 9, 1948, Cocea was made vice president of the reformed Writers' Society (later Writers' Union of Romania), alongside Galaction, Gábor Gaál and Al. Șahighian (Zaharia Stancu was the president, Ion Călugăru the general secretary). He died the next year, on 1 February 1949, at his home in Sighișoara, shortly after a spiritual crisis had brought him back into the Romanian Orthodox Church.

== Personal life and family ==
N. D. Cocea had a notoriously promiscuous lifestyle, a favorite topic of gossip and urban legends. In his recollections, fellow journalist Constantin Beldie alleged that Cocea once owned a summer pavilion frequented by debauched young women, a veritable "seraglio". A writer named Bogdan Amaru noted in autumn 1934 that "Nicu D. Cocea always walks around with two girls on his arms. The women sense in him the writer who is at all times willing to render them immortal with the tip of his pen." However, the intelligence agents keeping Cocea under surveillance during the 1930s and '40s collected rumors according to which their target was a homosexual. The Țara Noastră polemicists also claimed that Cocea's pederasty was a matter of public record.

Cocea's marriages and relationships resulted in four children: Tantzi, Dina, Radu and Ioana-Maria (also known as Maria Cocea). Florica Mille, who was his first wife, left him for his many affairs with younger women, even though, Dina Cocea recalls, she was forever fascinated by his intellect. After the 1920 divorce, Cocea is said to have lived with a Maria or Zoe Grigorescu. Tantzi, who was born to him from this relationship (1909), was the first wife of Liviu Ciulley (father of the award-winning filmmaker Liviu Ciulei). The writer's second marriage, to Lila Stănescu, was allegedly one of convenience, and he was at the time still in a physical relationship with Gina Manolescu-Strunga, the reason for his statutory rape trial. Their affair continued even after Gina married art critic Petru Comarnescu, and she was carrying Cocea's child when that marriage was annulled.

The daughter, Ioana-Maria, was later recognized by Cocea, and earned her artistic reputation as a sculptor; through her mother, she was related to the Ghica family and to the banker Iosif Pincas. Like Comarnescu before him, Cocea became disenchanted with Gina and was repelled by her public persona: his diaries contain sarcastic comments on her supposed lack of principles and naïveté, calling her Gina Balamuc ("Madhouse Gina"). After parting with Cocea, Gina was married to communist journalist Ghiță Ionescu (later known as an anti-communist academic, relocated to England). In the 1940s, while in Sighișoara, Cocea had as a mistress Ioana Mosora, who was more than 40 years his junior. One of his final projects was to educate Ioana, the daughter of impoverished peasants, on art and literary history.

According to literary historian George Călinescu, Cocea was only devoted to "the cause of the proletariat" in his public life: "in his most intimate life, an aristocrat, worshiping the established order and the supreme factor." The anticlerical journalist was always troubled by the matters of belief and organized religion. In Spre Roma, Cocea confesses about having piously knelt in front of Leonardo da Vinci's Last Supper, and about finding the arguments of Roman Catholic preachers to be almost irresistible. Cocea was still active in the Romanian Freemasonry: he stood by the dissident Masons who pledged allegiance to Grand Masters George Valentin Bibescu and Grigore C. Grigoriu; from 1945, he was himself a Deputy Grand Master. Reputedly, it was him who advised Grigoriu and Mihail Noradunghian to send this Masonic Lodge into "sleep", as a means to preempt communist suppression. In old age, he rediscovered Romanian Orthodoxy. He made arrangements for his parents to be reburied in Sighișoara, recognized all his illegitimate children, and, on his death bed, demanded to be buried with an Orthodox service performed by his old friend Galaction.

Beyond public cultivation, the Cocea–Galaction–Arghezi collaboration was tinged by malice and unresolved conflict. Cocea himself divulged Arghezi's private anti-communism in his 1946 report to the PCR overseers, recording that Arghezi rejected recruitment offers with sarcasm and pride. Arghezi's own private notes, and some of his published lampoons, contain some biting remarks about Cocea's communist career. In a 2005 interview, Galaction's daughter Elena also stated that her father had only remained in contact with Cocea because of Cocea's kinship with Zoe Marcou-Galaction; the family, she claimed, mistrusted and feared Cocea, whom Zoe herself likened to the devil, but whose conversation skills they all found irresistibly entertaining.

== Literary work ==
=== Satirist ===
In George Călinescu's definition, Cocea was "more of a yellow journalist than a talented one". Reviewing Fecior de slugă for Gând Românesc magazine in October 1933, cultural journalist C. Pastia sarcastically commented that Cocea's lampoons had "taught boys how to curse", in which action he identified the Cocea's lifelong objective. Similar assessments were later passed by other authors and researchers. Paul Cernat described Cocea the pamphleteer as "feared" and "vitriolic", while Stelian Tănase summarized his writing as "sharp, polemical and vulgar". Likewise, critic Mihai Zamfir calls Cocea's republican pamphlets "filthy", accusing them of promoting, together with the "stupid little poems" of the much older Alexandru Vlahuță, a distorted image of the Romanian monarchy. Stelian Tănase also notes that Cocea resorted in blackmail, just like his ex-pupil turned rival Pamfil Șeicaru, but that he was less interested than Șeicaru in accumulating fortunes. Cocea himself was vexed by Șeicaru's style. In his definition, it was the literary equivalent of "postilion curses".

The harsh pronouncements on Cocea's journalistic contributions are nuanced or contradicted by other writers and critics. Scarlat Callimachi spoke of his comrade, the "feared polemicist", as in reality "a good man" of "amazing generosity", and, stylistically, "a poet": "Even in his most violent articles one finds glimpses of true poetry." The latter trait, Callimachi assessed, survived no matter how hard Cocea trained himself to repress it. Cocea's skill was emphasized by his foe, Comarnescu, who believed Cocea to be a "semi-failure" as an intellectual, but also a "joker" of genius. According to Pastia: "no one in Romanian literature has ever speculated paradox with as much courage and talent." Writing in 1936, the young Facla essayist Eugène Ionesco (later a world-famous playwright), listed Cocea and Arghezi among the "peaks" of an older generation, as Romania's two "greatest lampoonists". Various other authors have also seen in Cocea a founding figure of the more satirical and politically aware side of modern Romanian humor.

=== Poet-Poetă ===
Cocea's youthful debut with Poet-Poetă was his homage to Symbolist prose poetry, colored with a strongly erotic tinge. According to George Călinescu, the book, "vehemently priapic and monotonous in its excess", borrows its tone from Alexandru Macedonski, its titillating subject from Pierre Louÿs, and its plot from Mihai Eminescu (the novel Cezara). The protagonists of Poet-Poetă, Iulius and Ersilia, living on love and desire, discover each other's bodies and then the joy of dying of one's own volition, hurling themselves off a precipice. Writing in 1911, Ilarie Chendi noted that the book was Cocea's first known blunder, speculating that literary failure had relegated Cocea to the promotion of other, more talented, Symbolists.

Călinescu sees the positive aspect of Poet-Poetă in its "delicate description" of the human form (Ersilia's hair, for instance, is stofă fără preț, "priceless fabric"). Fellow literary historian and critic Ștefan Cazimir has included Cocea's work among the Symbolist novels directly influenced by Vienna Secession art and the Secessionists' feminization of nature. Such traits also stand out in Galaction's biblical preface, a new Song of Songs: "Ersilia's eyes are as green as the depths of the ponds at Heshbon; and her breasts like twin does grazing among the lilies." These interventions were held against Galaction by literary historian Eugen Lovinescu (an outspoken adversary of the Viața Socială writers): "A militant Orthodox, [Galaction] prefaced in his youth novels which defile all things sacred".

In 1908, when he castigated both Symbolism and "perverted eroticism", Cocea left a detailed list of authors he considered "degenerate" and "bourgeois": Gabriele d'Annunzio, Dumas-fils, Maurice Maeterlinck, Anna de Noailles, Georges Ohnet, Marcel Prévost, and Oscar Wilde. According to literary historian Angelo Mitchievici, the substance of such "class-based criticism" was equivalent to the biological determinism of Cocea's nationalist adversaries, announcing the absolutes of fascism ("degenerate art") and communism (the Zhdanov Doctrine).

=== Vinul de viață lungă ===
Vinul de viață lungă is considered by some to be Cocea's main work as a novelist. The main character, Manole Arcaș, is, like Cocea himself, a Moldavian boyar. Successive episodes in the book reveal his complex worldview: Arcaș is an atheist with modernist sensibilities, a lover of nature, and a utopian socialist who has been turning his estate into a commune. Having reached a venerable age, he slowly reveals the secret of his longevity in conversations with the much younger judge: after decades of experimentation, the Arcaș estate produces a special sort of Moldavian wine; the grapes were pressed by Manole and a Romani (Gypsy) girl, in the course of their love-making. The object of Arcaș' olfactory fetish, the girl has died a tragic death, inspiring Manole to take up the winery project as a sort of symbolic rebirth.

With its aesthetics and its tone, Vinul de viață lungă is an unusual sample of militant literature, contrasting with the work of socialist or Poporanist writers from Cocea's lifetime. French historian Bernard Camboulives notes that Cocea made a point of reacting against Poporanists' call to preserve "Romanian specificity". Similarly, George Călinescu notes that the Poporanist setting is given an original twist in Cocea's novel, with the erotic interludes. As Callimachi writes, the book is a rare moment in which Cocea the poet vanquished Cocea the journalist, while Camboulives sees in it "a eulogy to life, to love, to the senses and to the most elevated thoughts". In Călinescu's more skeptical interpretation, it merely stands for "a journalistic narrative, with the stylistic decency of well-read men", its author being less than a "creator", its dialogues just "chatter".

=== Fecior de slugă, Pentr-un petec..., Nea Nae ===
During the interwar period, Cocea could at times register significant success, but it was largely owed to the scandalous nature of his novels. The issue was taken into consideration by Călinescu, who referred to Cocea's "exaggerated, but explainable" popularity. C. Pastia also suspected Cocea of pulling a prank, "leaving the impression that he had dedicated himself to literature" in Vinul de viață lungă, and then returning to the political stage with novel-lampoons. Cocea also found critics among his fellow modernists: writing in 1935, modernist critic Lucian Boz created a separation between the "pornographic novels" of Cocea or D. V. Barnoschi, which "have orgasm as their goal", and the controversial but "brave" literature of James Joyce.

Fecior de slugă, the first of Cocea's political novels, takes its artistic inspiration from the fin de siècle novelist Duiliu Zamfirescu, creator of the social climbing prototype Dinu Păturică. Cocea's Dinu is Tănase Bojogeanu, the "son of the servant" referred to in the book's title. As a child, he is shown competing in school with Nelu Azan, the daydreaming aristocrat, profiting from Azan's generosity and overtaking him in many respects. However, while Nelu preserves ideals which lead him into the communist movement, Tănase, the corrupt clerk, rises through the ranks to become King's Commissioner. The two are pitted against each other, their ideological conflict made worse when Bojogeanu sells a young female communist into sexual slavery.

Present throughout the work are masked portrayals of Cocea's political allies and adversaries. Pastia, who described such cameos as both cartoonish and interesting, identified Alexandru Averescu, Ion I. C. Brătianu, Constantin Dobrogeanu-Gherea, I. C. Frimu, Dumitru Iliescu-Turtucaia, Take Ionescu, Nicolae Iorga and some others. Pastia also suggests that the central theme (Bojogeanu as the bourgeois suffocating ancient boyardom) is conventional and ultimately irrelevant: "That may well be, and we agree that our morals may tolerate the decay of the Azans and the ascent of the Bojogeanus. But this did not a novel make. An issue of Facla would have sufficed." Călinescu spoke with displeasure about Fecior de slugă as an illustration of Cocea's "strident, violent style, excessively vulgar and of a sexuality that is never redeemed by a hint of whatever is eternally human." Pastia however found that Cocea wrote his book with noticeable talent "in rendering that which is vulgar", a Romanian answer to Charles Baudelaire's Les Fleurs du mal.

Pentr-un petec de negreață, with its name borrowed from peri-urban Romanian folklore, shows its male protagonist Andrei Vaia alternating between dreams of free love in the countryside and the adulation of Bucharest as a hotspot of erotic pursuits. Of the adventures depicted, some are believed to have been modeled on Cocea's own sexual exploits. A pivotal moment in the novel shows Andrei discovering that his Bucharest lover, Mira, is cheating on him with the hunchback Bergher, who has purchased her attentions with stockings and silk. Through Vaia's monologues, the book gives Cocea's views about the female psyche and bodily needs, the supposedly eternal insecurity of men, and the mystery of female orgasm. Pentr-un petec... doubled as a barely disguised satire of the interwar political class, in this case specifically directed at the National Peasants' Party—according to Călinescu, this was Cocea's selling tactic, as were its advertised depictions of "fornication" and "sexual abnormalities", or its licentious quotation from the Book of Proverbs.

In Nea Nae, the eponymous protagonist is a boorish and thick potentate, always on the hunt for "beastly erotic pleasures" (Călinescu), sometimes accompanied by thinly disguised political figures of the interwar. Călinescu was especially critical of Nae's speech patterns, caricatured "without the gifts of the picturesque".

== Legacy ==
Cocea greatly influenced the journalistic style of young Ion Vinea and Scarlat Callimachi. In addition to his presence in the memoirs or diaries of his friends and enemies, Cocea is the republican revolutionist in Cronică de familie ("Family Chronicle"), by the communist writer Petru Dumitriu—a text allegedly plagiarized from Vinea's unpublished works. Among the better-known visual portrayals of Cocea is a 1928 ink drawing by Marcel Janco.

Some of N. D. Cocea's writings enjoyed a good standing throughout Romania's communist period. During the early 1960s, official textbooks described him as one of those who covered the gap between 19th-century Realism and Romanian Socialist Realism. In particular, the communist regime overplayed Cocea's criticism of the Romanian monarchy, glorifying him as someone who had undermined the credibility of Michael I and his predecessors. In one instance, communist historiography even claimed that Cocea and Arghezi had served time for their 1912 anti-monarchy campaign, taking Facla lampoons at face value.

Cocea's World War II diaries were passed on to his relatives in Switzerland, and have not been published except for the short fragments hosted in the 1960s by two Romanian reviews: Magazin Istoric and Secolul XX. The former only featured redacted portions, communist censors cut out Cocea's critique of Soviet foreign policy, which were rendered sensitive by the recent intervention in Czechoslovakia, and also excised his thoughts on the Stalin cult. In 1970, an edition of Cocea's Jurnal ("Diary") was issued by the PCR's Editura Politică. A previously unknown novel by Cocea was signaled in the late 1970s, and was noted for its virulent attacks on Pamfil Șeicaru.

Cocea's literature and political controversy were also publicized outside Romania. From his refuge in Francoist Spain, Șeicaru made public his decades-long polemic with Cocea. His repeated talk about Cocea's immorality prompted literary historian Nicolae Manolescu to note a paradox: "It is somewhat strange to see accusations of immorality being launched by people who, beyond their talent [...], do not even possess the most basic moral sense. The mere fact that the pamphlets they hurl at each other, like hogwash, have morality as their stake (never their own, always the other's), should make one think." A French-language translation of Vinul de viață lungă was published by Jean de Palacio (Le Vin de longue vie, Le Serpent à Plumes, 2000). According to Romanian literary critic Mircea Iorgulescu, the positive reception of such works in France "would probably astound the Romanian literary environment, for whom Cocea hardly even exists."

Streets named after Cocea exist in Bucharest, Sighișoara, Brașov, Oradea, Sibiu and Timișoara. His residence in Sighișoara is preserved by the local authorities as a "memorial house". The same city is home to the N. D. Cocea Literary Club, established 1979.
