= Andrei Tudor =

Romanian poet and musicologist

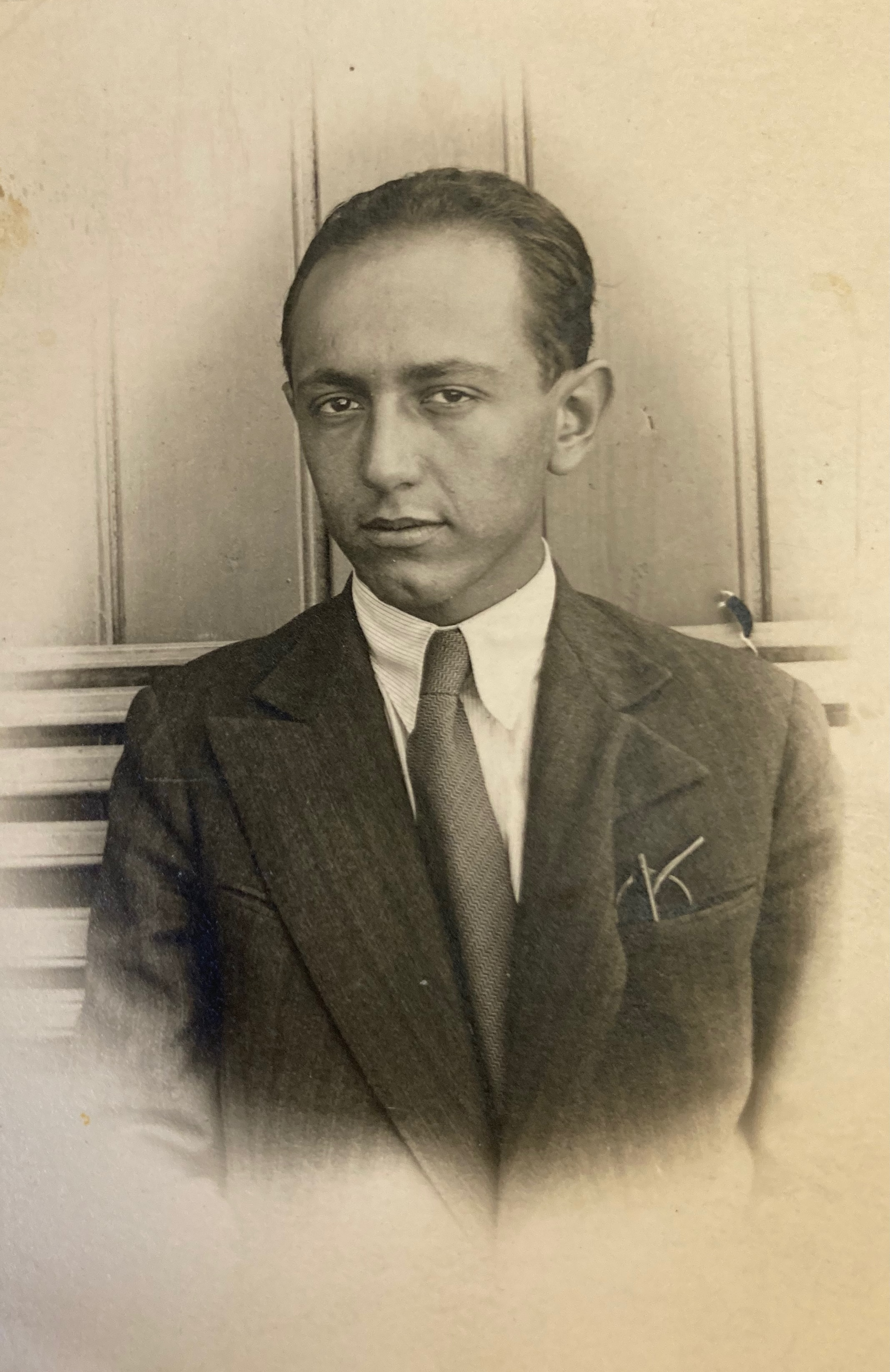
- Born: Isaac Rozenzweig; August 31, 1907; Brăila, Romania
- Died: June 18, 1959 (aged 51); Bucharest, Romania
- Resting place: Crematoriul Cenușa, Bucharest
- Citizenship: Romania
- Education: Juris Doctor
- Alma mater: University of Bucharest Law School
- Occupations: poet, translator, journalist, musicologist
- Spouse(s): Melania Tudor, 1938 - 1959
- Children: Manuela Lena, Alexandru Laurențiu
- Writing career
- Pen name: I. Alexis Edgar, Andrei Tudor, Lafcadio
- Language: Romanian
- Period: 1928 - 1959
- Subjects: poetry; cultural journalism; musicology
- Movements: avant-garde Symbolism; Criterion

Andrei Tudor (Romanian pronunciation: [anˈdrej ˈtudor]; (born Isaac Rozenzweig; August 31, 1907, Brăila – June 18, 1959, Bucharest) was a Romanian poet, translator and musicologist.

== Life ==
Tudor was born to a Jewish family in Brăila, the son of Mayer and Tony Rozenzweig. After graduating from the Nicolae Bălcescu National College in 1926, he attended law school at University of Bucharest.
He was licensed to practice in 1930, though ultimately never pursued a career in law. Instead, Tudor decided to pursue a literary and journalistic career in the capital; allowing himself a more intellectually conducive environment in which he could write about his true interests.
In 1940, Romania legislated its equivalent of the Nuremberg Laws, at approximately the same time when Tudor’s career began to gain traction. Much like other prominent Jewish writers of the time, his name was suppressed from media.
While in Prague in 1959, he fell ill. He ultimately sought treatment in Bucharest, but shortly thereafter succumbed to his illness as a result of medical negligence while hospitalized.

== Career ==
Tudor debuted his literary career in 1927 with a translation of French poet Francis Jammes. (Note: Mihail Sebastian collaborated on the translation of Francis Jammes's "Prayer for a child that he may not die". They were classmates throughout their school years; "Abraham and David Schwarzman" grammar school, Nicolae Bălcescu National College and University of Bucharest Law School.)

Francis Jammes Prayer Alexis Edgar - Andrei Tudor and Mihail Sebastian translators

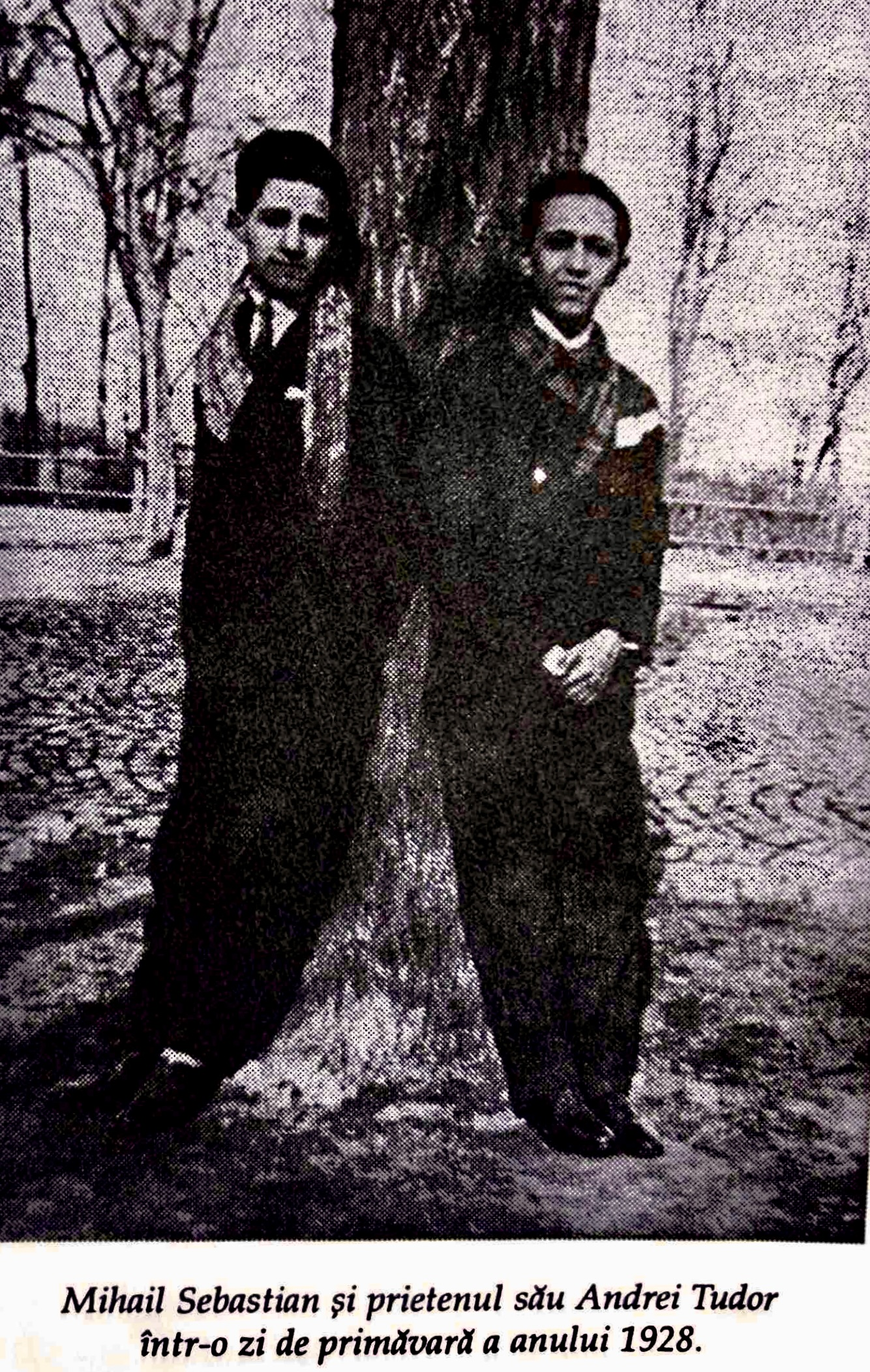
Andrei Tudor and Mihail Sebastian in Brǎila, 1928

His first the poem, Trupește, was printed in 1928. Tudor's poetry and prose appeared in avant-garde publications. (Note: „Convorbiri Literare", „Revista Fundațiilor Regale", Universul Literar, „Bilete de papagal" (editor-in-chief Tudor Arghezi), „Tiparnița literară", „Contimporanul" (under the pseudonym Lafcadio), „Excelsior" (under the pseudonym Lafcadio), „Viața de azi", „Viața literară", „Revista Muzicală și poezie", „Azi" (editor-in-chief Zaharia Stancu), „Herald", „Pinguin", „Clopotul", „Contemporanul", „România liberă". After 1944 he writes for „Veac nou", an ARLUS publication.) Several newspapers and periodicals regularly printed his musical, theatre and cinema reviews. (Note: „Rampa", „Cuvântul", „Facla", „Zorile" (cultural section editor), „Săptămâna literară, plastică, teatrală", „Vremea", „Meridian", „Adam", „Litere", „Premergătorul", „Stilet", „Curierul" (Brăila), „Start", „Omul liber", etc. After 1944 he writes for „Victoria", „Unirea", „Tribuna poporului", „Viața capitalei".) In 1935 his first and only poetry volume, Love 1926, was awarded the poetry prize by Fundația Pentru Literatură și Artă "Regele Carol II". (Note: The King Carol II Foundation for Art and Literature was an institution founded by King Ferdinand I on August 12, 1921 and was named after the future sovereign Carol II. Founded on the patronage of Prince Carol II, the Foundation developed a prodigious cultural activity during 1921-1940, after which, due to political events, it declined.) It was published in 1937.

Cover of Love 1926 (1937)

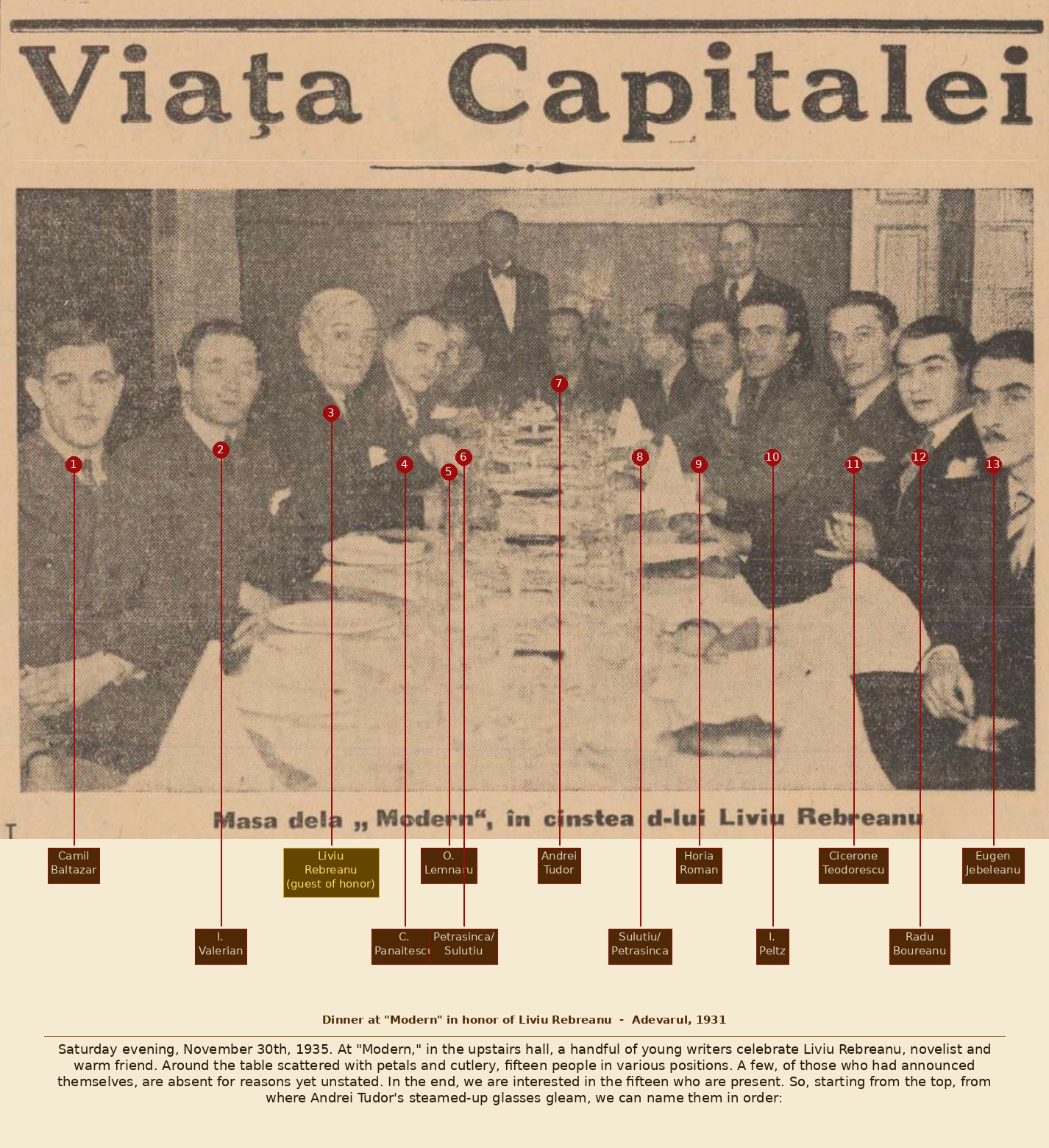
Dinner at "Modern," Bucharest, November 30, 1935, in honor of novelist Liviu Rebreanu. Identified participants from left to right: Camil Baltazar, I. Valerian, Liviu Rebreanu, C. Panaitescu, Oscar Lemnaru, Octav Șuluțiu, Dan Petrașincu, Andrei Tudor, Horia Roman, I. Peltz, Cicerone Teodorescu, Radu Boureanu, and Eugen Jebeleanu. Source: Adevărul, December 5, 1935.

Along with other members (Note: Mihail Sebastian, Petru Comarnescu, Mircea Eliade, Eugen Ionescu, etc. were fellow contributors to Revista Fundațiilor Regale", „Excelsior" (under the pseudonym Lafcadio), „Azi" (editor-in-chief Zaharia Stancu), „Rampa", etc.) of the Criterion group, Tudor was closely associated with, the now defunct, Pro-Arte music conservatory. After the war he translated Social realist poets from the USSR, Czechoslovakia and Korea. (Note: Tudor translated Francis Jammes, Albert Samain, Stefan George and Rainer Maria Rilke before the 2nd World War.) but his interests increasingly turned to music. He held lectures to popularize classical music before live audiences and on the radio. Tudor, an early Enescu scholar, curated the newly (1956) established museum dedicated to the composer. In May 1955 he wrote a proposal for an international Enescu festival. The first edition of the festival took place in 1958. Tudor worked at several cultural institutions:

- 1951 - 1952 editor-in-chief at Revista Muzica [The Music Journal] (official publication of the Union of Composers and Musicologists from Romania)
- 1950 - 1959 professor at the Bucharest Conservatory
- 1951 - 1959 director - Music History department, Art History Institute, Romanian Academy
- 1951 - 1956 professor at the Institute for Theatre I. L. Caragiale Caragiale National University of Theatre and Film
- 1955 - 1959 Editorial Committee member Studii și Cercetări de Istoria Artei [Art history: Studies and Research] (official publication of the Romanian Academy, Art History Institute)

== Selected works ==
=== Poetry ===
- (1937) Love 1926: poems

Mihail Sebastian reviewed Amor 1926 in Revista Fundațiilor Regale (1937), offering a favorable assessment. He praised Tudor as a literary "amateur" in the positive sense — a writer of refined taste and creative freedom — invoking Marcel Proust as a parallel. Sebastian identified Tudor's strengths in his gentle irony, playful humor, and dreamy ingenuousness, and situated him in a literary family alongside Perpessicius and D. Iacobescu in Romanian poetry, and Francis Jammes, Levet, and Toulet in French. He also praised Tudor's unpublished translations as among the finest expressions of his poetic sensibility.

==== Translations ====
- (1927) Francis Jammes Prayer
- (1950) Soviet poets: Peace songs
- (1951) Korean poetry selections
- (1952) The book of blood: the heroic resistance of the Greek people
- (1955) Vítězslav Nezval A song of peace

=== Prose ===
- (1947) Moscow : The metropolis of the new world

==== Translations ====
- (1953) Leonid Lench Funny Stories

=== Musicology ===
==== Books ====
- (1951) Sovietic music in full swing Pref.
- (1957) Enescu (Note: This is the first Enescu monograph by a Romanian author. In 1955 Bernard Gavoty published the Enescu interviews recorded in 1951 for Radio France. Gavoty, Bernard (1955). Les Souvenirs de Georges Enesco [Recollections of George Enescu] (in French). Paris: Flammarion. OCLC 2714693. I. Yampolsky published a pamphlet about Enesco in the USSR in 1956.)
- (1959) George Enescu: His Life in Pictures

==== Essays ====
- (1945) A note on tradition in soviet music
- (1947) Three decades of soviet music
- (1956) Enescu's work and the problems of folk themes use in musical creation
- (1955) Eduard Caudella and the Romanian lyrical theatre
- (1959) New creative aspects of contemporary Romanian symphonic music

==== Articles ====
(Note: The Rumanian Review, a monthly literary magazine published in Bucharest in several languages, targeted the surviving intelligentsia within the country and an interested intellectual readership beyond its borders. Articles analysed reflect the Party's requirement that the journal should demonstrate Romania's loyalty to the emerging socialist system, and publicise that, in reorganising the country's cultural life, the Party had not necessarily abandoned Romania's cultural traditions. The study investigates how music was utilised as a tool of governance, how authors shaped their discussion in relation to the prevailing, and sometimes shifting, ideology, and what can be inferred about the supported and marginalized composers in this period. Crotty, Joel (Summer 2009). "Promoting Romanian Music Abroad: The Rumanian Review (1946–1956)". Music & Politics. III (2). doi:10.3998/mp.9460447.0003.203. hdl:2027/spo.9460447.0003.203.)

- (1946) Music Chronicle
- (1946) The Society of Rumanian Composers
- (1946) The Forthcoming Musical Season
- (1947) Rumanian Musicians and the Exchange of Culture
- (1947) Opening of the Season
- (1947) Rumanian Artistic Relations With Foreign Countries
- (1955) Rumanian Music Forges Ahead

== Sources ==
- Academia Română (2007). "Andrei Tudor" [General Dictionary of Romanian Literature]. Dicționarul General al Literaturii Române (in Romanian). București: Editura Univers Enciclopedic. pp. 787–788. ISBN 978-973-637-070-0. OCLC 1288698681.
- Cosma, Viorel (2006). "Andrei Tudor" [Romanian Musicians]. Muzicieni din România (in Romanian). Vol. 9. Bucharest: Music Publishing House. p. 114. ISBN 978-973-42-0441-0. OCLC 21372940.
- Stancu, Zaharia (1934). "Andrei Tudor" [Young Poets' Anthology]. Antologia Poeților Tineri (in Romanian). Fundația Pentru Literatură și Artă "Regele Carol II". OCLC 31368873.
- Podoleanu, S. (1935). "Andrei Tudor" [60 Romanian Jewish Writers]. 60 Scriitori Români De Origină Evreească (in Romanian). Vol. 2. București: Slova. pp. 345–348. OCLC 252731680.
- Călinescu, Gheorghe (1941). "Andrei Tudor" [The history of Romanian literature from origins until present]. Istoria Literaturii Române Dela Origini Până în Prezent (in Romanian). București: Fundat̡ia regală pentru literatură s̡i artă. pp. 818–819. OCLC 1064893006.
- "Romanian Literature". Encyclopaedia Judaica. Vol. 17 (2 ed.). p. 400. ISBN 978-002-865-928-2.
- Evelin Fonea (2002-09-01). "Un Muzicolog Poet" [A musicologist poet]. Realitatea Evreiască [The Jewish Reality] (in Romanian) (170-171/970-971).
- "Those Jews from Braila". Romanian Jewish Heritage romanianjewish.com.
- Manolescu, Florin Lucian. "Andrei Tudor". blogspot.com.
- "Revista Fundațiilor Regale". Revista Fundațiilor Regale [The Journal of the Royal Foundation for Art and Literature] (in Romanian). OCLC 3092764.
- Crotty, Joel (Summer 2009). "Promoting Romanian Music Abroad: The Rumanian Review (1946–1956)". Music & Politics. III (2). doi:10.3998/mp.9460447.0003.203. hdl:2027/spo.9460447.0003.203.
- Grăsoiu, Dorina (1986). Mihail Sebastian Sau Ironia Unui Destin [Mihail Sebastian or Fate's Irony] (in Romanian). București: Editura Minerva. OCLC 18064988.
- Hangiu, Ion (2008). Romanian publications from origin to present. Chronological dictionary 1790–2007. București: Editurii Comunicare.ro. ISBN 978-973-711-163-0.
- Mitchievici, A. (2019). "Shadows of Paradise". Shadows of Paradise: Romanian Intellectuals and the Soviet Union. Central European University Press. pp. 99–124. ISBN 9789633863039. JSTOR 10.7829/j.ctvs1g8th.8.
- Dumitrescu-Bușulenga, Zoe (2002). "Un conservator uitat: pro-arte" [Pro-Arte: A forgotten music conservatory]. Magazin Istoric (2).
