= Facla =

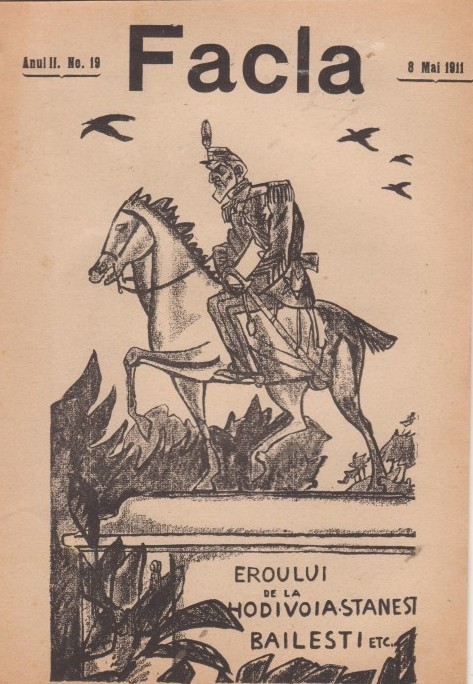
Title page of the issue of 8 May 1911 featuring a cartoon of King Carol I

Facla ("The Torch") was a Romanian political and literary magazine.

Facla was published weekly in Bucharest between 13 March 1910 and 15 June 1913, daily from 5 October 1913 to 5 March 1914, weekly from 1 January to 7 August 1916 and daily from 26 April 1925 to 9 September 1940. Initially describing itself as a “weekly magazine”, this changed in 1911 to a “literary, political, economic and social magazine”. It was headed by N. D. Cocea in 1913-1914 and 1925, and by Ion Vinea in 1930–1940; he had earlier served as lead editor in 1925–1926. The editorial committee of 1912 consisted of Cocea, Toma Dragu, Tudor Arghezi, Constantin Graur, Em. Argin (S. Labin) and Iosif Nădejde. Drawings and illustrations were by Jean Alexandru Steriadi, Iosif Iser, Camil Ressu and Francisc Șirato.

The magazine appeared the same year as the Social Democratic Party of Romania (PSDR), and its positions largely reflected those adopted by the emerging socialist movement and its chief ideologue, Constantin Dobrogeanu-Gherea. Its contributors were mainly moderate socialists who espoused the liberal tradition of Western European socialism, in contrast with the radicals who formed the Romanian Communist Party in 1921. Facla defended the interests of the working class, campaigning for ideological maturity in the spirit of socialist doctrine, for the raising up of political consciousness through the democratization of public life — goals which, once achieved, would alight “the flame of an unextinguished ideal of culture and of social justice”. The first issue of 1911 launched an “Appeal to the nation’s democracy” (Apel către democrația țării), announcing that Facla, together with the socialist newspaper România Muncitoare, would open a subscription list for the PSDR's electoral fund.

A supporter of Marxism and internationalism, the magazine political pamphlets using irony to criticize the “retrograde” bourgeois ideology of the governing parties and any school of thought rooted in the past, such as Junimism. In this spirit, Tudor Arghezi signed anticlerical pamphlets, while Cocea criticized the monarchy; the pamphlet eventually became a trademark of Facla. The nationalism of right-wing thinkers came under attack, for example Nicolae Iorga in 1911. The only solution the magazine recommended for the national interest was a vote for the PSDR, which “however much they might chase after equality, cannot be squeezed into the equality Brătianu=Carp=Take=Iorga”. The same year saw the publication of a mocking “obituary” for Junimism. After the outbreak of World War I, the magazine came out firmly against neutrality and in favor of Romania's entry into combat on the Entente side, hoping thus to achieve Greater Romania Illustrative titles include Jos neutralitatea. Spre Ardeal (“Down with Neutrality. To Transylvania”) and Trăiască România Mare! (“Long Live Greater Romania!”)

Literature was less present, with special attention focused on debates, polemics and articles on political, social and cultural themes. The young poet Vinea signed literary columns and reviews, Emil Isac wrote the 1914 articles Ardelenism (“Transylvanianism”) and Dușmanii mei (“My Enemies”), while the same year, Camil Petrescu published a few notes titled Femeile și fetele de azi (“The Women and Girls of Today”). Other articles, all from 1911, were signed by Em. Argin (Guvernarea burgheziei reacționare, “Government by the Reactionary Bourgeoisie”), I. C. Frimu (Datoria democrației, “Democracy’s Debt”) and Cocea (Procesul nostru cu A. C. Cuza, “Our Lawsuit against A. C. Cuza”, Descompunerea naționalismului, “Nationalism’s Decomposition”). Background articles were written by Cocea, Toma Dragu, M. Mircea and D. Drăghicescu. Short biographies of writers appeared: Arghezi, Ion Minulescu and Barbu Ștefănescu Delavrancea.

Publication resumed in 1925 after a hiatus of nearly a decade. The scope was broader and the structure more varied; political and literary pamphlets were joined by pages of literature, art, popular science and interviews with writers. The first number of the revived publication featured an interview by Cocea of Panait Istrati, one of whose novels Cocea would translate and print in Facla as Pe malurile Dunării (On the Shores of the Danube). Emil Gulian handled the literary columns. The “literature, art, science” section discussed the avant-garde writers from Contimporanul. Taking over in 1930, Vinea attracted a new set of contributors, including Ion Marin Sadoveanu, Radu Boureanu, Tudor Teodorescu-Braniște, Miron Radu Paraschivescu and Virgil Madgearu. In 1932, the “literature-art” section was edited by Alexandru Sahia and G. M. Zamfirescu. Other collaborators included Ioan Alexandru Brătescu-Voinești, Constantin Mille, B. Brănișteanu, Nicolae Davidescu, Dimitrie Anghel, Șt. O. Iosif, Cezar Petrescu, Gala Galaction, I. Peltz, Demostene Botez, Andrei Tudor and Cicerone Theodorescu.
