= Levet =

Levet may refer to:

== People ==
- Fabrice Levet (born 1959), French sailor
- Henry Jean-Marie Levet (1874–1906), French diplomat and poet
- Richard Harrington Levet (1894–1980), American judge
- Robert Levet (1705–1782), friend of Samuel Johnson
- Sandrine Levet (born 1982), French rock climber
- Thomas Levet (born 1968), French golfer

== Places ==
- Levet, Cher, commune in the Cher department in the Centre-Val de Loire region of France

== Music ==
- Levet, an Old English name for a morning bugle call
