= Lemnaru =

Lemnaru, meaning "carpenter", is a Romanian surname that may refer to:

- Mădălin Lemnaru (born 1989), Romanian rugby union player
- Oscar Lemnaru (1907–1968), Romanian journalist, short story writer and translator
- Valentin Lemnaru (born 1984), Romanian footballer
