= Cicerone Theodorescu =

Romanian poet (1908–1974)

Cicerone Theodorescu (February 9, 1908 – February 18, 1974) was a Romanian poet.

Born in Bucharest, his father was a laborer for Căile Ferate Române state railway. After attending high school in his native city, he studied at the literature and philosophy department of the University of Bucharest. He then taught in various high schools and worked as an editor and reporter. A contributor to the left-wing press, he signed, together with other pro-democracy intellectuals, protests against the country's drift toward fascism. After the King Michael Coup of 1944, Theodorescu held important posts at Centrala Cărții publishing overseer, was vice president of the Romanian Writers' Society from 1944 and editor-in-chief of Viața Românească magazine from 1948.

Theodorescu made his literary debut in 1925 in Perpessicius' Universul literar; he subsequently published in Azi, Credința, Cuvântul, Cuvântul liber, Facla, Lumea, Sinteza, Gazeta literară, Viața Românească, Vremea, Zodiac, România Literară and Luceafărul. His first book was the 1936 Cleștar, described by Ovid S. Crohmălniceanu as "enclosing the soul's turmoil in glacial, pellucid verses, slowly carved with a jeweler's care". He drew particular notice for his verses inspired from the work and suffering of railwaymen. His other volumes followed the same direction (including Cântece de galeră, 1946; Focul din amnar, 1946; Un cântec din ulița noastră, 1953, State Prize). However, with time, his lyricism tended toward the epic or became anemic, and remained lively only in the collections of fixed-form poems such as rondels. His later books included Poteca lunii, 1964; Hronic, 1965; Zburătorul din larg, 1965; Țărmul singuratic, 1968; Platoșa duratei, 1973 and Nebunul regelui, 1976. In 1971-1972, near the end of his life, he spent lengthy periods in Rome, writing a poem about Trajan that remains unpublished.

Theodorescu translated widely, in particular Soviet literature (Vladimir Mayakovsky, Aleksandr Tvardovsky), but also authors who included William Blake, Jérôme Carcopino and Lino Curci. He collected folklore (Izvoare fermecate, 1958) and wrote prolifically for children, although some of these works are now irrecoverable. He sometimes used the pen names Radu Lăncieru, Victor Sângeru, C. Tudor and C. Tudoran.
