= Vasile Savel =

Romanian author (1885–1932)

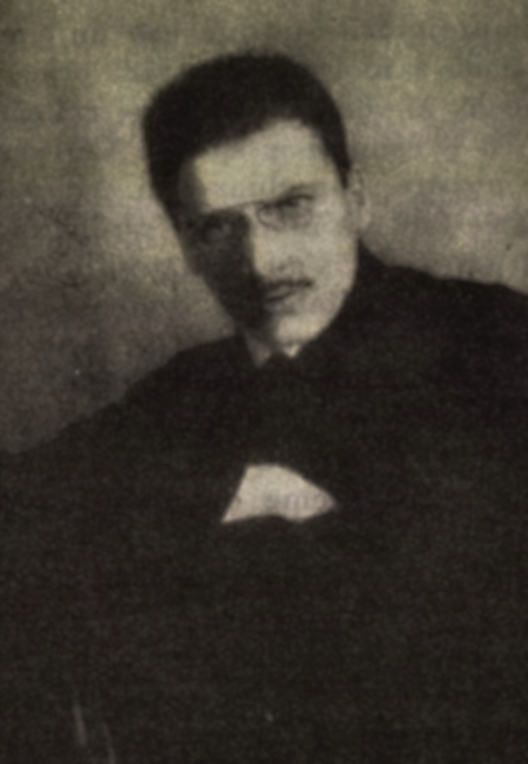
Savel c. 1910

Vasile Savel (January 25, 1885–May 17, 1932) was a Romanian prose writer.

Born in Fălticeni, his parents were Ecaterina and Ion, a priest and teacher; the family lived on the same road as Mihail Sadoveanu. He attended gymnasium in his native town, followed by the Boarding High School in Iași from 1897 to 1904. He subsequently studied literature and law at the University of Bucharest, earning a degree in the latter field. Obliged to earn his own money, he entered journalism in 1904, editing Minerva, Seara and România newspapers. His work appeared in Flacăra, Mișcarea Literară, Dimineața, Presa, Sămănătorul, Viața Românească, Luceafărul and Cuvântul Liber. He served as secretary general of the Romanian Writers' Society, which he had joined in 1911. His debut brochure, the 1906 Opera d-lui Ilarie Chendi, featured incisive observations; a polemical work that often unfairly targeted the journalistic activity of Ilarie Chendi, it drew wide comment. A reserve officer, he took part in both the Second Balkan War and World War I, often seeing frontline action. He returned to journalism after the war, initially at Arad; from 1928, he edited the official gazette of the National Peasants' Party, Dreptatea. In the first volume of Contimporanii (1920), he sketched biographical portraits of several writers he knew personally: Emil Gârleanu, N. D. Cocea, T. Robeanu, Cincinat Pavelescu, Panait Cerna, Ludovic Dauș, Ștefan Octavian Iosif and Dimitrie Anghel.

Savel's short story collections Între rețele (1919), Într-un sat de contrabandiști (1920), Pribeag (1920) featured war themes. In particular, the first offers a vivid look at the life of a young officer in the trenches; the writing is skeptical, even misanthropic, reflecting a harsh reality and devoid of sentimentality or false patriotism. The 1926 novel Vadul hoților also dealt with the war, imagining life in a border village during the conflict. A previous novel, the 1921 Miron Grindea, was only a partial success: while making pertinent observations about life in Romania at the dawn of the 20th century, its characters are wooden and its Sămănătorist outlook was already obsolete. Doine din război (1925) featured verses in the doina style collected on the front during World War I. He translated works by Honoré de Balzac, Alexandre Dumas, Karl Emil Franzos and Guy de Maupassant. He wrote accusatory articles from the front, published in Cuvântul Liber beginning in December 1919; these were collected as Oamenii cari nu vorbesc (1921). While Savel's writing is endowed with a journalistic ease of expression, his stylistic lapses are sometimes magnified by a moralizing, pathos-laden tone.
