= Ury Benador =

Romanian playwright and prose writer

Ury Benador is the pen name of Simon Moise Grinberg (May 1, 1895 – November 23, 1971), a Romanian playwright and prose writer.

== Early life, family and education ==
Grinberg was born in Mihăileni, Botoșani County, Romania. His parents were Moise Fridl, a Yiddish-language writer, and his wife Liba (née Schmidt).

== Career ==
A self-educated man, his first published work was a one-act play that appeared in the Iași Lumea in 1924. This was subsequently included in his first book, 5 acte (1925). Magazines that ran his work include Viața Românească. Lumea literară, Rampa, Revista Fundațiilor Regale, Albina and Gazeta literară.

His prose works (including Ghetto veac XX, 1934; Hilda, 1936; and "Gablonz". Magazin Universal, 1961) are documentary and analytical in nature, aiming to capture on their canvas the social and moral environment of Romanian Jewish society in the first half of the 20th century.

== Activities beyond writing ==
He was a member of the Sburătorul circle. In 1939, he took part in a congress of intellectuals for peace held in Paris. A leftist, he became a leader of the pro-Romanian Communist Party Jewish Democratic Committee soon after World War II.

In 1948, after the establishment of a communist regime, he was part of the first leadership committee of the Romanian Writers' Union. Until 1955, he was secretary of the State Jewish Theater.

== Honors, recognition and awards ==
Grinberg won the Romanian Dramatic and Music Critics' Association Prize in 1924. However, in a contemporaneous review, critic Ion Simuț took the position that Benador "was never more than a second-rate author".

== Personal life and demise ==
Grinberg died in 1971 at age 76.
