= Tudor Teodorescu-Braniște =

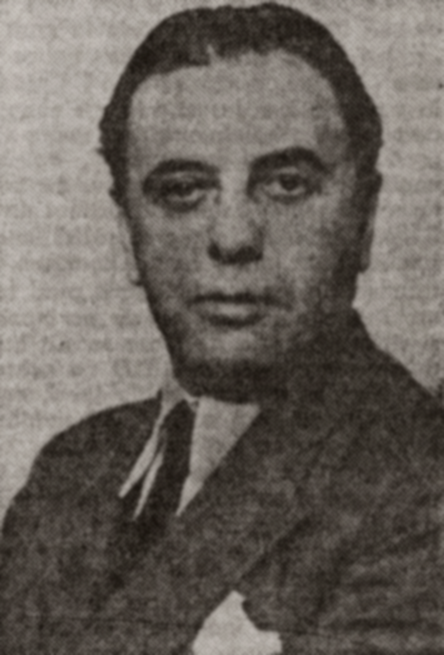
Teodorescu-Braniște in 1939

Tudor Teodorescu-Braniște (April 12, 1899 – March 23, 1969) was a Romanian journalist. He was editor at a number of newspapers, including Cuvântul Liber from 1933 to 1936, Aurora, Adevărul and, from 1944 to 1947, Jurnalul de Dimineață, which was ultimately suspended from publishing due to his and his staff's steadfast refusal to adopt a pro-Soviet stance.

Born in Pitești, he took refuge with his family in Bârlad during World War I. At the end of the war, he returned to his native city, completed high school, and then graduated from the University of Bucharest's law school in 1921. He practiced law for a short time at the Ilfov County Bar, then devoted himself entirely to the life of a journalist and politician. He debuted in 1915, under the pseudonym Andrei Braniște, at Rampa and then collaborated on publications such as Revista noastră, Sclipiri, Progresul, Hiena, Contimporanul, Facla, Mișcarea, Muncitorul, Cuvântul, Parlamentul, Opoziția, Curentul, and Revista politică. He also wrote for Excelsior, Progresul social, Herald, Revista Fundațiilor Regale, Însemnări ieșene, Lumea românească, Liberalul, Gazeta literară, Ramuri, Tribuna, and Luceafărul. His writings include "Șovăiri" (1921), "Oameni și cărți" (1922), "Ochiul de nichel" (1927), "Fundătura cimitirului no. 13" (1932), "Domnul Negoiță" (1932), "Băiatul popii" (1933), "Oameni de ieri..." (1938), "Prințul" (1944), "Scandal" (1945), "Primăvara apele vin mari" (1960), "Oameni și paiațe" (1967), and "Pavilionul de vânătoare" (posthumous, 1986). He died in Bucharest.
