= Oscar Lemnaru =

Romanian journalist, short story writer and translator

Oscar Lemnaru (born Oscar Holtzman; February 1, 1907 – May 17, 1968) was a Romanian journalist, short story writer and translator.

Born into a Jewish family in Bucharest, his parents were Solomon Holtzman and his wife Sali. He attended high school in Brăila, where he made his journalistic debut in 1927, in Florile Dunării magazine. Attracted by Bucharest, he dedicated himself to journalism, writing for Ion Vinea's Facla, George Călinescu's Lumea, Azi, Reporter and Revista Fundațiilor Regale. In addition to reporting, he commented on philosophy and art and submitted literary essays and aphorisms. He was an active participant in the city's coffee-house life, making puns and delivering memorably spirited soliloquies; his oral work was comparable to that of Păstorel Teodoreanu, Tudor Mușatescu and Șerban Cioculescu. He was friends with the latter, as well as with Ion Barbu and Camil Petrescu.

Lemnaru's only book, the 1946 fantasy short story collection Omul și umbra, was quoted at the Sburătorul literary circle but did not arouse interest. In Azi magazine in 1935, he published a fragment of the unfinished novel Adonis hâdul. During his later years, he moved into the shadows of literary life, polishing translations of insignificant Russian-language works and himself translating Émile Zola, Romain Rolland and Robert Merle from the French. Omul și umbra, which could not be published under the communist regime that eschewed its sort of fantasy, was reissued in 2000.
