= Henry Jean-Marie Levet =

Henry Jean-Marie Levet (13 Januar 1874–15 December 1906) was a French diplomat and poet.

Levet worked in the French consular service in his late twenties, but in his early twenties he was only a couple of years older than the more famous poet Leon-Paul Fargue, and they knew each other as young men in the café scene in Paris. Fargue related that Levet loved maps, compasses, and wore beautifully cut English-style suits. He was always willing to help out those with less money. In order to indulge his eagerness to travel, Levet joined the consular service and served in India, Vietnam, the Philippines and finally in Argentina. He sent his charming verses home to be published in popular journals. In the introduction to the French edition of Levet's Poèmes (Maison des Amis des Livres, Paris, 1921; Gallimard 2000), the great French poet Valery Larbaud relates that he read and memorized Levet's verses, and hoped to meet him when he came back to France on leave.

Levet came home sooner than expected with a disease that left him unable to speak. He tried to recuperate on the Riviera, but his strength left him and he died soon after.

Fargue and Larbaud made a literary pilgrimage to Levet's parents’ home in Montbrison (a small city between Italy and Nice), some five years after Levet's demise. Larbaud commented that if one is too late to meet someone, one can be met instead by a pale featureless head on blind white stone. Nevertheless, he felt that something of Levet remained in his parents’ house, especially in the room set aside for memorabilia. There were photographs from Maharajas with dedications in English, and a flag from a nearly unknown country.

Fargue and Larbaud considered Levet to be the next important link in the chain of modernism that runs from Walt Whitman to Arthur Rimbaud to Jules Laforgue. Larbaud wrote, ‘I dreamed of a poet, a fantasist, sensitive to the diversity of race, peoples, countries, for whom everything or nothing would be exotic (it amounts to the same thing), very ‘international,’ a humorist, capable of doing Whitman tongue-in-cheek, giving a comic note of joyous irresponsibility, which was lacking in Whitman. At bottom, I was looking for a successor to Laforgue, Rimbaud, and Whitman. And here I seem to have found him ... Henry J.-M. Levet.’

Globe-trotting cosmopolitan poets such as Blaise Cendrars and Paul Morand, or so says the Larousse Dictionary of Contemporary Poetry, ‘cannot hide what they owe him.’ Even the surrealists, particularly Philippe Soupault and Paul Eluard, seem to have taken a cue from Levet.

Levet wrote a novel called The Benares Express, but it was withheld from publication by his parents, and is now presumably lost, aside from a few mentions in the letters and writings of the period. Other than that novel, what is all the more astonishing about Levet's influence is that, aside from a few garbled pages of juvenilia along symbolist lines, Levet's mature work amounts to 11 pages. Those 11 pages, known as ‘Cartes Postales’, or ‘Postcards’, were all published here in Jacket 18 magazine for the first time in English in their entirety by Kirby Olson. They are in the same order that they were originally published by Maison des Amis des Livres in 1921.
