= Isac Ludo =

Romanian writer and politician

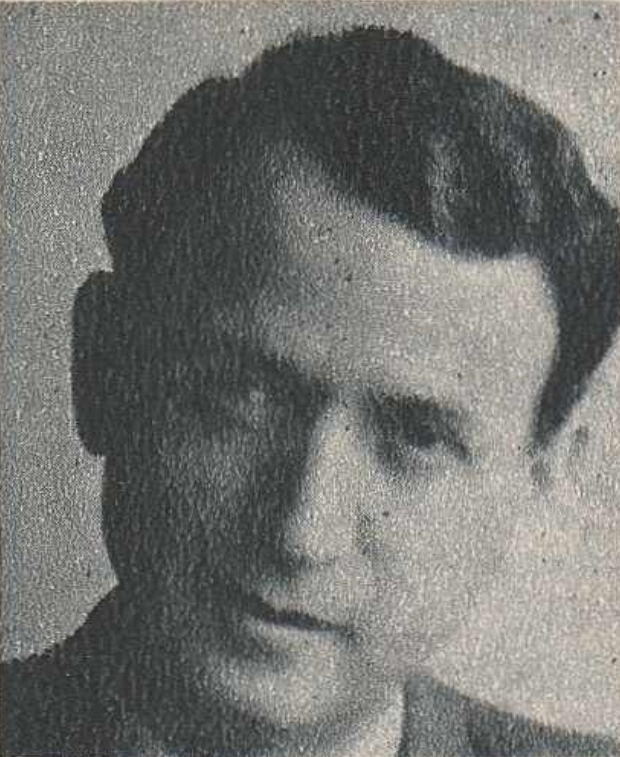
- Born: November 4, 1894
- Died: May 23, 1973
- Writing career
- Pen name: I. Ludo

Isac Ludo (1894–1973) was a Romanian writer and political figure.

Born into a Jewish-Romanian family, Ludo was active in left-wing literary circles prior to World War II. After the Communist take-over in 1947, he rose to important positions in the régime's censorship office.

Prior to 1965, he published a series of novels — Domnul general guvernează ("The General Rules"), Starea de asediu ("State of Siege"), Regele Palaelibus ("King Palaelibus"), Salvatorul ("The Saver"), Ultimul batalion ("The Last Battalion") — which constituted a satirical panorama of political life in Greater Romania.

Ludo also published translations into Romanian from the Yiddish language writer Scholem Aleichem.
