= Contimporanul =

Romanian magazine

Contimporanul (antiquated spelling of the Romanian word for "the Contemporary", singular masculine form) was a Romanian (initially a weekly and later a monthly) avant-garde literary and art magazine, published in Bucharest between June 1922 and 1932. Edited by Ion Vinea, Contimporanul was prolific in the area of art criticism, dedicating entire issues to modern art phenomena, and organizing the Bucharest International Modern Art Exhibit in December 1924 (with the participation of Constantin Brâncuși).

Several writers contributing to Contimporanul soon moved on to adopt more specific styles, including a literary form of constructivism (which was the dominant style of the magazine for a certain period), Dada, and, eventually, surrealism.

== History ==
Seeing itself as a direct successor to Contemporanul, it first advertised itself as a "social magazine", it became a voice for modernism in 1924, when it published a manifesto virulently attacking the cultural establishment (Manifest activist către tinerime - "Activist Manifesto to the Youth"). It stated:

"Down with Art

For it has prostituted itself!
[...]
WE WANT

the miracle of the new and self-reliant word; the strict and swift eloquent expression of Morse-code machines."

In 1924, between November 30 and December 30, in the hall of the Fine Arts Trade Unions in 6 Corabiei Street, Bucharest, the magazine organized the International Contemporary Exhibition in which almost all members of the Romanian avant-garde exhibited. The exhibition established the magazine as one of the leading publications of European avant-garde.

Throughout its existence, Contimporanul was a virulent opponent of Gândirea; thus, it kept a more reserved attitude toward Expressionism (which was promoted by the latter). Nevertheless, it published articles by Herwarth Walden, and several other of its contributors were enthusiastic supporters of Der Sturm guidelines.

== Notable contributors ==
=== Romanian ===
- Felix Aderca
- Tudor Arghezi
- Ion Barbu
- Dan Botta
- Constantin Brâncuși
- N. D. Cocea
- Jacques G. Costin
- Sergiu Dan
- Victor Eftimiu
- Mircea Eliade
- Benjamin Fondane
- Marcel Janco
- Eugen Jebeleanu
- János Mattis-Teutsch
- M. H. Maxy
- Ion Minulescu
- Camil Petrescu
- Ion Pillat
- Mihail Sebastian
- Claude Sernet
- Păstorel Teodoreanu
- Andrei Tudor
- Sandu Tudor
- Tristan Tzara
- Ilarie Voronca

=== Foreign ===
- Hans Arp
- André Breton
- Paul Éluard
- Filippo Tommaso Marinetti
- Paul Klee
- Herwarth Walden
