= Azi (Romanian newspaper) =

Romanian newspaper

Azi (Today in Romanian) is a Romanian daily newspaper published in Bucharest. The paper was started in 1990.

Today was also the name of a literary magazine published monthly in Romania, from March 1932 to August 1938, under the direction of Zaharia Stancu. The magazine had socialism and antifascism orientation. It reappeared between February 19, 1939, and September 8, 1940, as a political-literary weekly magazine.
