= Eugen Jebeleanu =

Romanian poet, translator, journalist and scholar

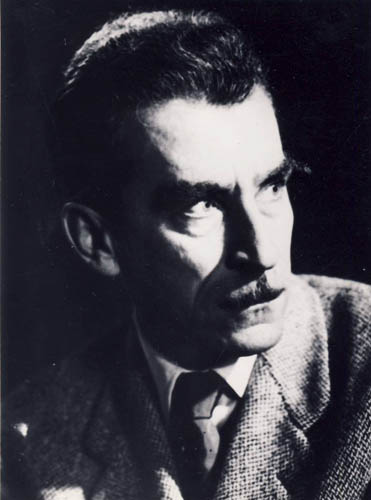
- Born: April 24, 1911; Câmpina, Kingdom of Romania
- Died: August 21, 1991 (aged 80); Bucharest, Romania
- Education: University of Bucharest
- Occupations: Poet, translator, journalist
- Spouse: Florica Cordescu
- Children: 2
- Writing career
- Years active: 1927–1980
- Genre: Socialist realism
- Notable work: Surîsul Hiroșimei
- Notable awards: Herder Prize

Eugen Jebeleanu (Romanian pronunciation: [e.uˈdʒen ʒebeˈle̯anu]; 24 April 1911 – 21 August 1991) was a Romanian poet, translator, journalist, and scholar.

== Biography ==
He was born in Câmpina, where he attended elementary school. After graduating in 1922, he enrolled at the Andrei Șaguna High School in Brașov. During his time in Brașov, he published his first poems five years later in the literary review Viața literară. His first book of poetry, Schituri cu soare ("Sketes with Sun"), appeared in 1929, the year he moved to Bucharest to study law at the University of Bucharest. He published another volume of poems, Inimi sub săbii ("Hearts under Swords") in 1934, but Jebeleanu's principal literary activity in the 1930s was a journalist closely allied with the left-wing press.

After World War II, he solidly supported the new Communist leadership and ardently promoted socialist realism. Most of his postwar poetry focuses on the struggle against fascism, the Romanian revolutionary tradition going back to 1848, and supporting the new regime's ideology. Despite his political engagement, his poetry rose above the level of a verse pamphleteer. His postwar volumes of poetry include Ceea ce nu se uită ("What Cannot Be Forgotten", 1945); Scutul păcii ("The Shield of Peace", 1949); Poeme de pace și de luptă ("Poems of Peace and War", 1950); În satul lui Sahia ("In Sahia's Village", 1952); Bălcescu (1952), a long poem written in honour of the historian and revolutionary Nicolae Bălcescu; and Cîntecele pădurii tinere ("Songs of the Young Forest", 1953). He used animal epithets to depict the former elite of the "bourgeois-landlord regime," from politicians to industrialists and kulaks ("she-snakes’ kin"), and foreign enemies, with a place of honor reserved for British and American "imperialists" ("wolves ... lurking with bullet eyes", "afraid of the red flames, the frocked big-bellied bats", "owls loaded with bling bling").

Jebeleanu first achieved international recognition with his collection of humanitarian poems about the atomic bombing of Hiroshima: Surîsul Hiroșimei ("The Smile of Hiroshima", 1958). After an "oratorio" celebrating the liberation at the end of the war, Oratoriul eliberării ("The Oratorio of Liberation", 1959), and a volume of selected verse, Poezii și poeme ("Poems", 1961), he published one of his most highly regarded collections of poems, Lidice, Cîntece împotriva morții ("Lidice, Songs against Death", 1963). In the same spirit of universal humanism as Surîsul Hiroșimei, his new collection was inspired by a postwar visit to the site of the Czech village of Lidice, which together with its inhabitants was totally destroyed by the Nazis during World War II as an act of revenge.

Jebeleanu's other publications include Din veacul XX ("From the Twentieth Century", 1956), a collection of journalistic texts; Poeme, 1944–1964 ("Poems, 1944–1964", 1964); Elegie pentru floarea secerată ("Elegy for the Cut Flower", 1966), one of his important collections of lyrics and a break from his previous engaged poetry; Hanibal ("Hannibal", 1972), a volume of poems; and Deasupra zilei ("Above the Day", 1981), a book of "jottings" on various subjects. In the 1970s, the Romanian Academy, of which he was a titular member, nominated him for the Nobel Prize in Literature. In 1973, he was awarded the Herder Prize.

Although initially a supporter of the regime, he expressed alarm after the July Theses were issued in 1971 and, considered one of the leaders of the liberal wing of the Writers' Union of Romania, was dropped from the Romanian Communist Party's central committee at its 13th Congress in 1984.

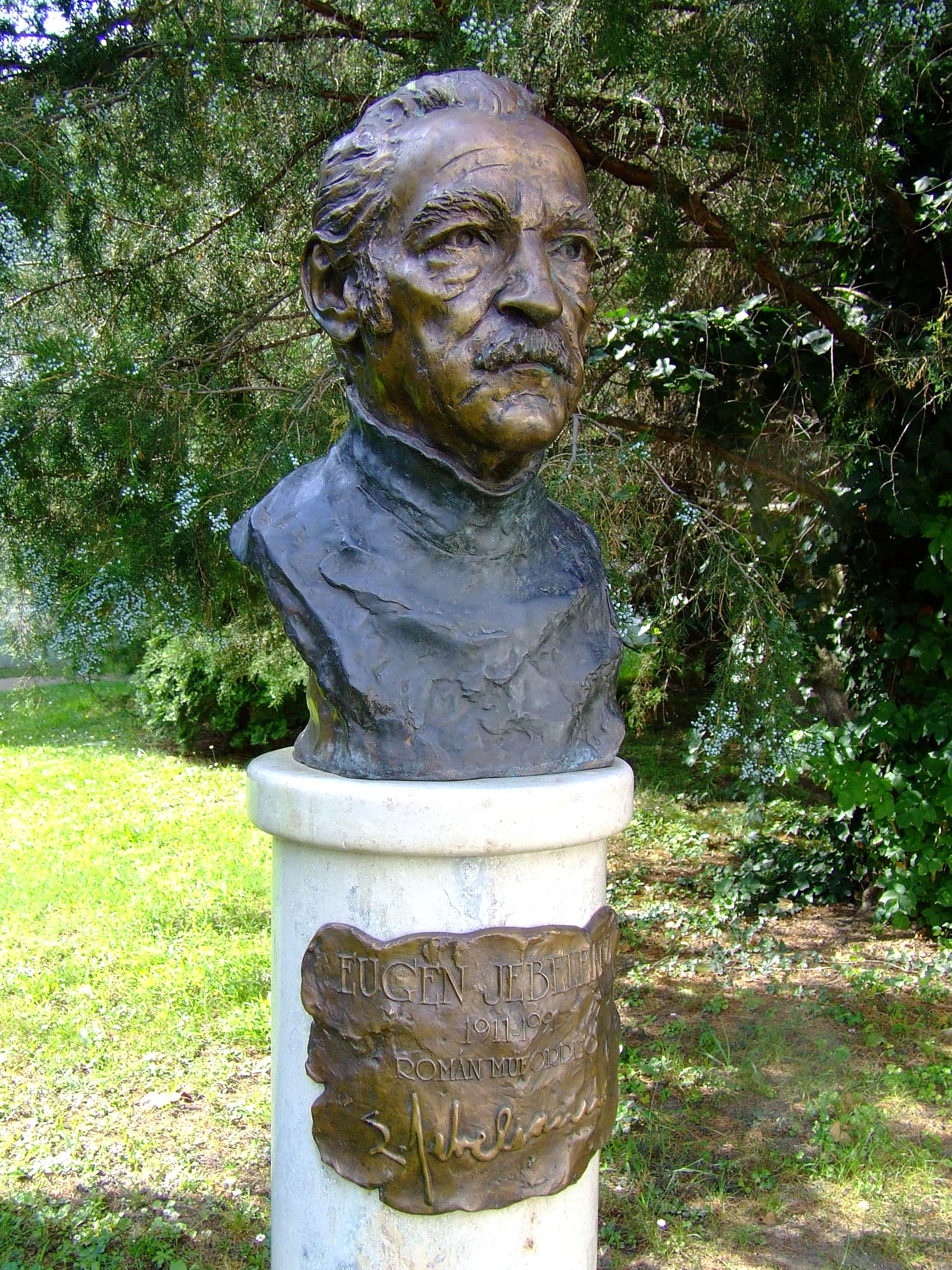
Bust of Jebeleanu at the Petőfi Museum in Kiskőrös, Hungary

Jebeleanu translated poetry from six languages, including Hungarian (Petőfi), Turkish, French (Hugo) and German (Rilke). Three poems of his appeared in English in a 1969 anthology, and five more in 1985. In 2007, his last collection of poems, Armă secretă ("Secret Weapon", 1980), was published in English, the first complete volume of his work to be translated into the language. His son Tudor is a graphic artist. He and his wife Florica (née Cordescu), a painter who died in 1965, had a daughter, also named Florica.

One of his hobbies was recreational fishing. He died in Bucharest, at age 80.

Composer Elise Popovici used Jebeleanu’s text for her song “Gold and Silver.”
