= Isac Peltz =

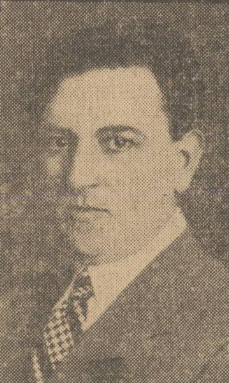
- Born: 12 February 1899; Bucharest, Kingdom of Romania
- Died: 10 August 1980 (aged 81); Bucharest, Socialist Republic of Romania

Isac Peltz or Ițic Peltz (12 February 1899 – 10 August 1980) was a Romanian prose writer and journalist.

== Early life and education ==
Born into a Bucharest Jewish family of small craftsmen, his father Nathan Peltz was a tailor, while his mother Estera (née Rotenberg) made linens. He was self-taught, and reportedly studied Jewish theology, although there is no documentary evidence to support the notion.

== Journalism ==
In 1915, he edited and wrote Îndrumarea magazine, which appeared for only a brief period; this marks his published debut. His first book was the 1916 essay Menirea literaturii, in which he argued for a "message literature" and stressed the importance of ethics. In 1916, he worked as a proofreader at Gazeta ilustrată. In 1918, he was an editor for Scena and Presa liberă; the same year, he held a similar role at Alexandru Macedonski's Literatorul. In 1919, N. D. Cocea hired Peltz at Chemarea and Facla newspapers; at the same time, he was an editor at Adevărul and Dimineața.

During the interwar period, he had an active newspaper career, also working as an editor at Epoca, Îndreptarea, Lupta, Era nouă, Ordinea, Izbânda and Avântul, and as a contributor for the magazines Sburătorul (sporadically attending the publication's Eugen Lovinescu-led circle), Viața Românească, România Literară, Cuvântul liber, Azi, Șantier, Bilete de Papagal, Vremea, Reporter and Adevărul literar și artistic. He directed two magazines, Caiete lunare (1927) and Zodiac (1930-1932). He sometimes used the pen names I. P. Aniurg, Enter, Ipel, Logicus, I. Pajură and Rix.

After World War II and with the rise of the communist regime, Peltz was an editor at the newspapers Drapelul (December 1944 – 1946) and Era nouă (1946-1948), and a contributor to România Liberă (1957-1963), Steagul roșu, Informația Bucureștiului, Munca, Gazeta literară, România Literară, Luceafărul, Veac nou, Albina, Flacăra, Pentru Patrie and Revista cultului mozaic. Arrested in 1949, he was sentenced to three years' imprisonment in 1950, passing through the prisons at Calea Rahovei, Jilava, Gherla, and Aiud.

== Literature ==
His first book of literature, Fiori (1918), included prose poems. For a time, he wrote plays (Veninul, 1917; Crima, 1920; Ediție specială, 1921), which appeared in Revista pentru toți. His short prose includes Stafia roșie (1918), Meșterul viață (1919), Paiațele (1921) and Fantoșe vopsite (1924); Peltz returned to the genre under communism, with Inimi zbuciumate (1962), Până într-o zi (1963), Fauna burzuluiților (1965), Instantanee comice – și nu prea... (1967) and Microbar (1971). His most noted works were his novels, beginning with Viața cu haz și fără a numitului Stan (1929) and Horoscop (1932), but especially Calea Văcărești (1933) and Foc în Hanul cu tei (1934), which showed the full measure of his writing talent, later diluted and marked by aesthetic lapses in "Actele vorbește" (1935), Țară bună (1936), Nopțile domnișoarei Mili (1937) and Pui de lele (1937). The World War II-era Ion Antonescu regime officially banned his entire work as "Jewish". His postwar Israel însângerat (1946), Vadul fetelor (1949) and Max și lumea lui (1957) were unremarkable, but retained their setting within a Jewish milieu, which he barely updated to reflect current realities. Authors he translated alone or in collaboration include George Sand, Henri Murger, Pierre Daix, Sarah Bernhardt (Memoirs), O. Henry, Aziz Nesin, Konstantin Fedin, Ivan Yefremov, Arseniy Golovko, Mikhail M. Nikitin, Pyotr Pavlenko and Alexander Rekemchuk.

== Recognition ==
He won the Romanian Writers' Society Prize in 1929 and the Romanian Writers' Union Special Prize in 1979.

== Personal life ==
Peltz was a member of the Romanian Freemasonry. His daughter Tia was a painter.
