= Ovid S. Crohmălniceanu =

Romanian philologist (1921–2000)

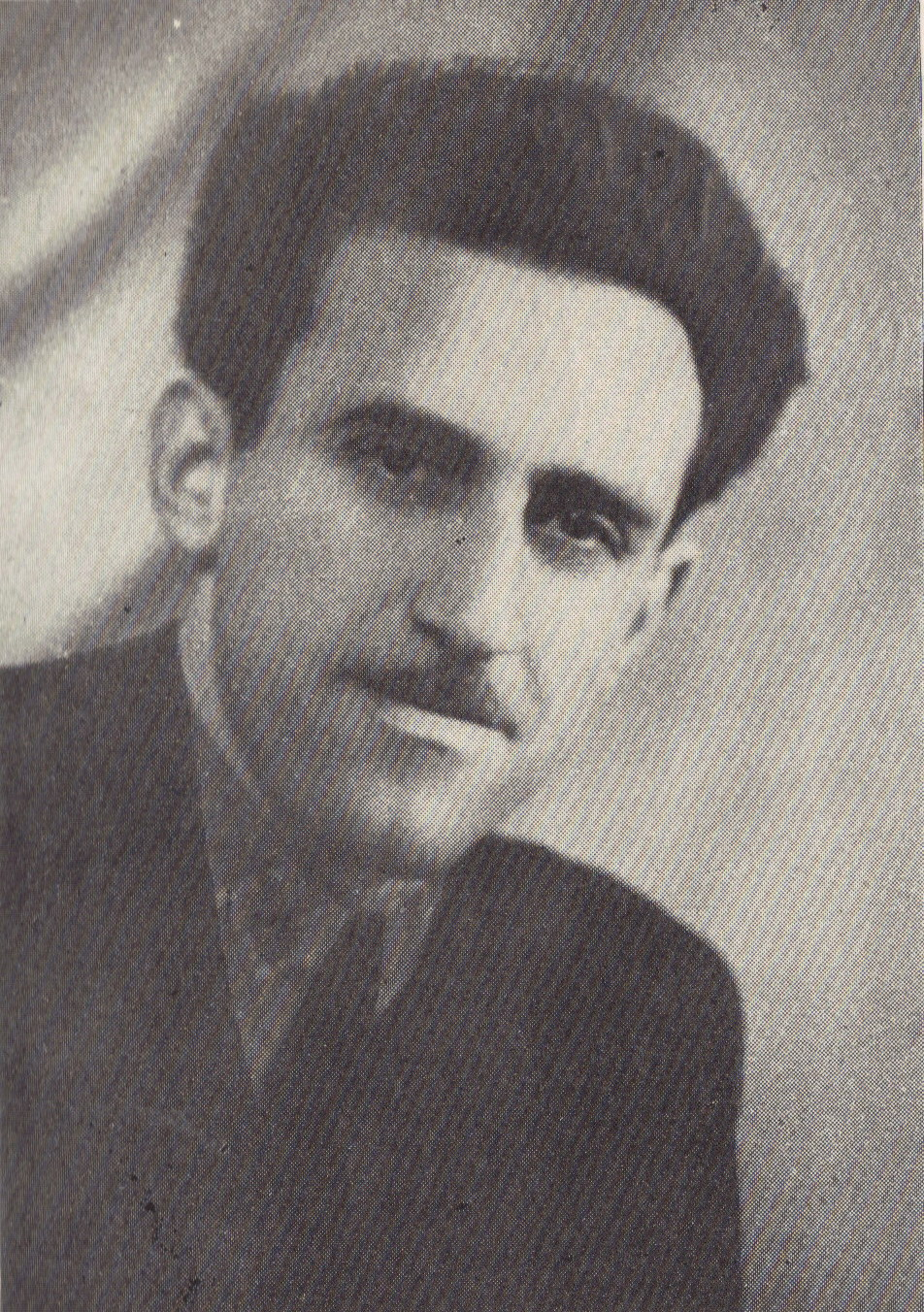
Ovid S. Crohmălniceanu (c. 1957)

Ovid S. Crohmălniceanu (born Moise Cahn or Cohn; 16 August 1921, in Galați, Romania – 27 April or 28 April 2000, in Berlin, Germany) was a Romanian literary critic and science fiction writer.

== Biography ==
After graduating from high school in his home town, he began to study, in 1939, at the Politehnica University of Bucharest, but had to interrupt his studies in 1940. In 1944, he resumed his studies, and got a diploma in construction engineering in 1947.

After World War II, he had a series of jobs in the magazines (Contemporanul, Viața Românească, Gazeta literară) and in a publishing house (Editura Didactică și Pedagogică) before beginning to work as an academic, eventually becoming a professor at the Department of Romanian Language and Literature of the University of Bucharest.

During the first two decades after World War II, at least, Crohmălniceanu was known as a promoter of socialist realism, branding any kind of freedom writers dared take as being "reminiscences of bourgeois thinking" and "influenced by reactionary circles in the West." But, at the same time, he is one of those who played a major role in bringing Tudor Arghezi and Lucian Blaga back into the limelight, after they had been marginalized.

In his last decade in Romania, before emigrating to Germany in 1992, he supported many young writers, encouraging them to follow another path than that of communist nationalism.

He died during the night of 27 to 28 April 2000.

== Books ==
- Cronici și articole, 1953
- Cronici literare, 1954
- Liviu Rebreanu, 1954
- Despre originalitate,1954-1956
- Despre realismul socialist, 1960
- Tudor Arghezi, 1960
- Lucian Blaga, 1960
- Istoria literaturii române între cele două războaie mondiale, 3 volumes., vol I-III, 1967-1975
- Cinci prozatori în cinci feluri de lectură, 1984
- Literatura română și expresionismul, 1971
- Cinci prozatori în cinci feluri de lectură, 1989
- Pâinea noastră cea de toate zilele, 1981
- Al doilea suflu, cronici și comentarii despre fenomenul optzecist, 1989
- Alăptat de două mame, 1992
- Amintiri deghizate, (memoirs), 1994
- Cercul Literar de la Sibiu și influența catalitică a culturii germane, with Klaus Heitmann, 2001
- Evreii în mișcarea de avangarda românească, 2002, published postumely
- Antologia poeziei franceze de la Rimbaud până azi, with Ion Caraion

== Science fiction ==
- Istorii însolite, 1980
- Alte istorii însolite, 1986

== Translations ==
- Vatslav Vorovsky: Studii de critică literară ("Literary Criticism Articles"), 1958 (with M. Baraz)

== Awards ==
- Romanian Writers' Union Award, 1971
- Bucharest Writers' Association Award, 1980
