= Alexandru Sahia =

Romanian writer

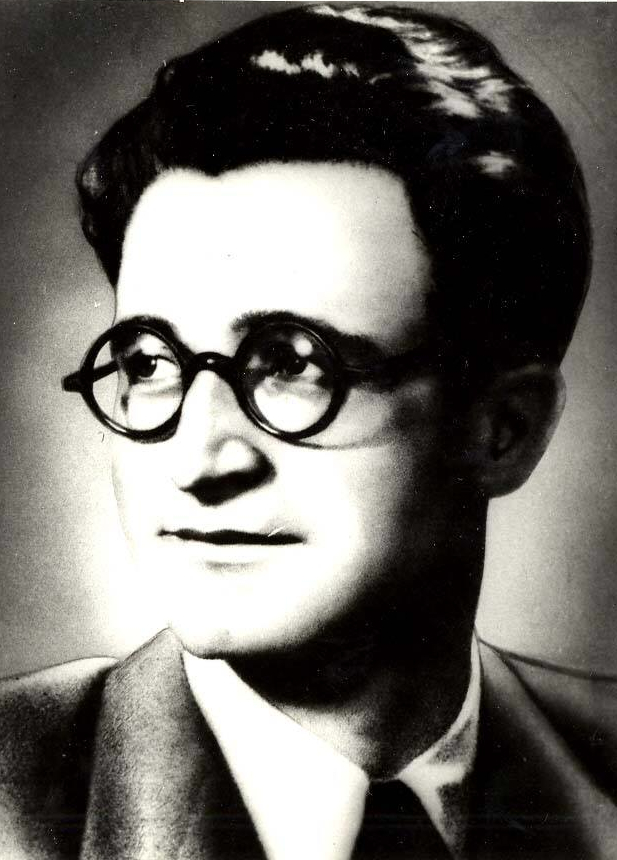
Sahia in the 1930s

Alexandru Sahia (pen name of Alexandru Stănescu; October 11, 1908 – August 12, 1937) was a Romanian journalist and short story writer.

== Biography ==
Born in Mânăstirea, Călărași County, as the son of a small landowner, he was enrolled in the Craiova Military College, which he deemed "oppressive". In 1926, he published his first story in the journal Șoimii (The Falcons). The following year, he concluded that he was not suited for a military career, and left the college. He finished his secondary education in the Saint Sava National College, then started law studies at the University of Bucharest.

Dissatisfied with life at the university, he became a novice in the Cernica Monastery in 1929. He apparently failed to find what he was looking for, and left after only a year to visit the Holy Land. While there, he decided to adopt the name "Sahia", which is Arabic for "truth".

From 1931 until his death, he provided sketches and reportage for several popular Romanian newspapers and journals, including Rampa, Cuvântul liber, and Adevărul. In 1932, he helped create the proletarian literary journal, Bluze albastre, but it suffered from censorship and low readership.

Still in search of something to give meaning to his life, he visited the Soviet Union in 1935. He was impressed with what he saw and, upon his return, wrote USSR Today, in praise of their accomplishments. The following year, he joined the Romanian Communist Party (RCP).

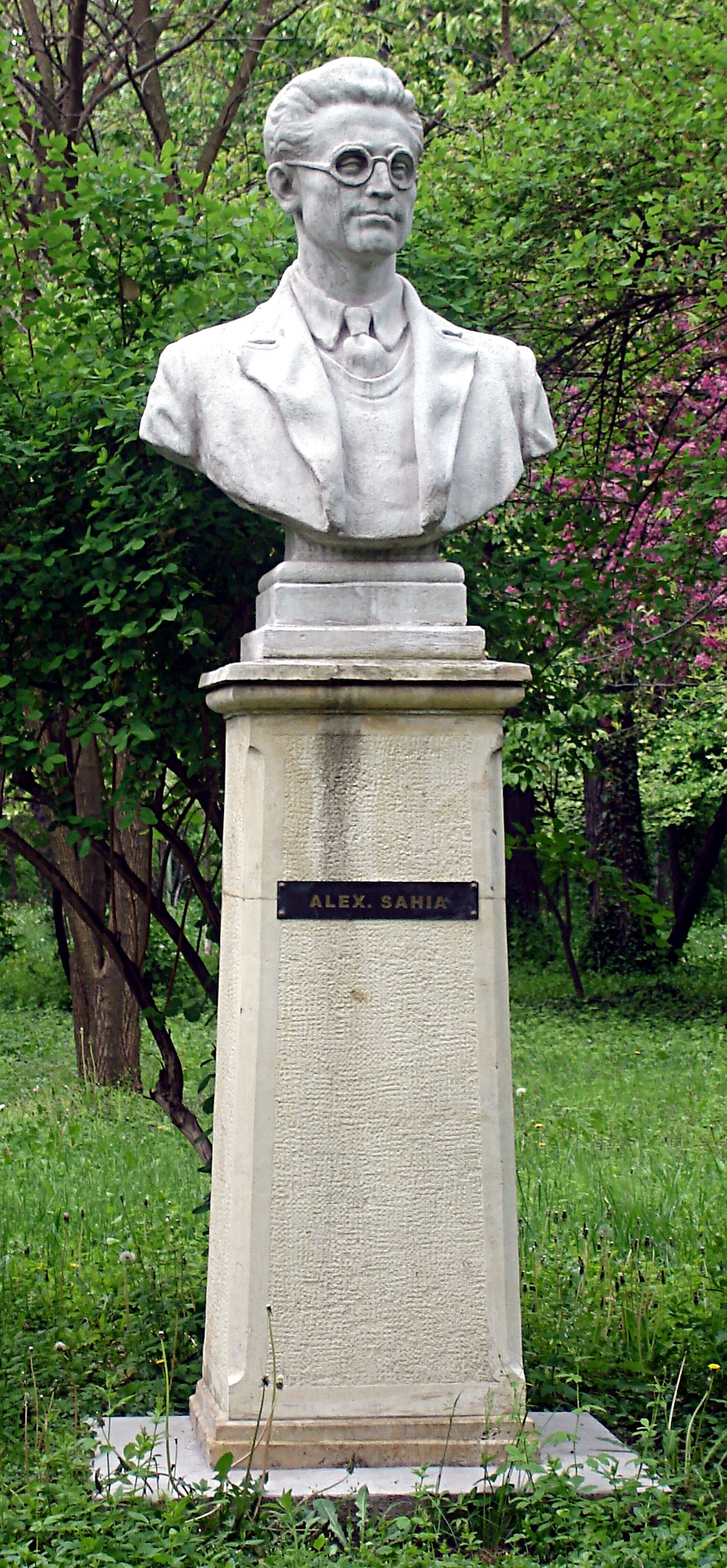
Bust of Alexandru Sahia in Parcul Carol, Bucharest

In 1937, he died in Bucharest of untreated tuberculosis. In 1946, after the Communist takeover, he was promoted as a hero of the working class and the manner of his death enabled the RCP to portray him as being the son of "poor peasants".

Several of his works have been made into films. In December 1952, the Romanian state company Romfilm was renamed the "Alexandru Sahia Film Studio"; in July 1991 the studio was reorganized as Sahia-Film.
