= Revista Fundațiilor Regale =

Revista Fundațiilor Regale ("The Review of Royal Foundations") was a monthly literary, art and culture magazine published in Romania between 1934 and 1947.
