= Romanian Writers' Society =

The Romanian Writers' Society (Romanian: Societatea Scriitorilor Români) was a professional association based in Bucharest, Romania, that aided the country's writers and promoted their interests. Founded in 1909, it operated for forty years before the early communist regime transformed it into the Writers' Union of Romania.

== Background ==
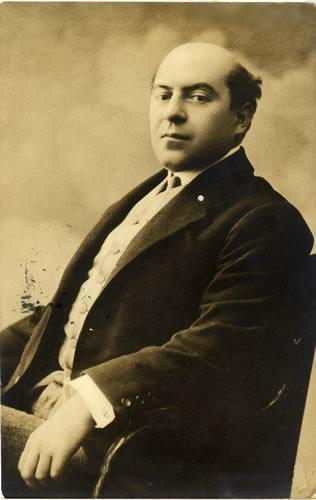
Cincinat Pavelescu, one of the leading founders of the Romanian Writers' Society.

Towards the end of the 19th century, a growing number of Romanian writers felt the need for a professional association to defend their interests before editors and bookstores and facilitate mutual aid. Although the circle surrounding the Literatură și artă magazine shared these objectives, the idea of an independent association developed later and under pressure from foreign professional organizations that were concerned about intellectual property rights. Consequently, the circle became the Romanian Society for Literature and Art, which was legally recognized in May 1904. The society included artists of various kinds with diverse interests, as well as artists' descendants and art collectors. Its presidents were Dimitrie C. Ollănescu-Ascanio, Alexandru Dimitrie Xenopol, and George Bengescu-Dabija, while N. Petrașcu served as secretary. The society's main achievement was an international congress on intellectual property regulation held in Bucharest in 1906. Bucharest city hall donated land for the construction of an artists' house, but it appears the lot was used differently. In 1903–1904, the press mentioned other initiatives for establishing a writers' society; one of these belonged to Transylvanians Ilarie Chendi and Ștefan Octavian Iosif.

In 1908, several poets and prose writers, led by Cincinat Pavelescu, founded an association called the Romanian Writers' Society. The founding meeting took place on April 28, coinciding with the 70th anniversary of the Société des gens de lettres' establishment. Twenty writers attended, and the leadership committee consisted of Pavelescu as president, George Ranetti and Dimitrie Anghel as vice presidents, Constantin Sandu-Aldea and Mihail Sadoveanu as accountants, Ioan Adam and George Murnu as treasurers, Emil Gârleanu and Ludovic Dauș as secretaries, Iosif as librarian, and Virgil Caraivan as cashier. The original statute does not survive, but later accounts suggest it was inspired by the French model. The small number of participants was due to a lack of interest from older writers, opposition from certain public figures to society's strictly professional character, and the exclusion of literary critics, a clause against which Chendi strongly protested. The event received little attention from the press; Ion Scurtu predicted the "shaky" group would face an "early demise".

== Founding ==
By the middle of the following year, amid a deteriorating literary atmosphere, the need for a relaunch became apparent. In July 1909, Anghel and Iosif launched an appeal for a writers' congress, an effort to which Chendi rallied. However, conditions did not permit the congress to take place, but it was decided that a new writers' society should be established. A sixteen-member committee met in August, presided over by Anghel, and the founding meeting was scheduled for early September. The initiative was promoted in the press, with the editor of the Minerva newspaper, Vasile Savel, publishing a series of articles on the need for a society and its potential goals. Despite being launched hastily during the summer holidays, the articles were successful, drawing responses from Constantin Rădulescu-Motru, Adam, Chendi, Eugen Lovinescu, Sadoveanu, Scurtu, Anghel, Iosif and Nicolae N. Beldiceanu. Additionally, Nicolae Iorga, Simion Mehedinți, Corneliu Moldovanu, Dimitrie Teleor and Aurel Alexandrescu-Dorna expressed their opinions on the topic in their own periodicals. Among the responders, only Iorga objected, considering the idea materialistic and unsuitable for "the true purposes of national literature".

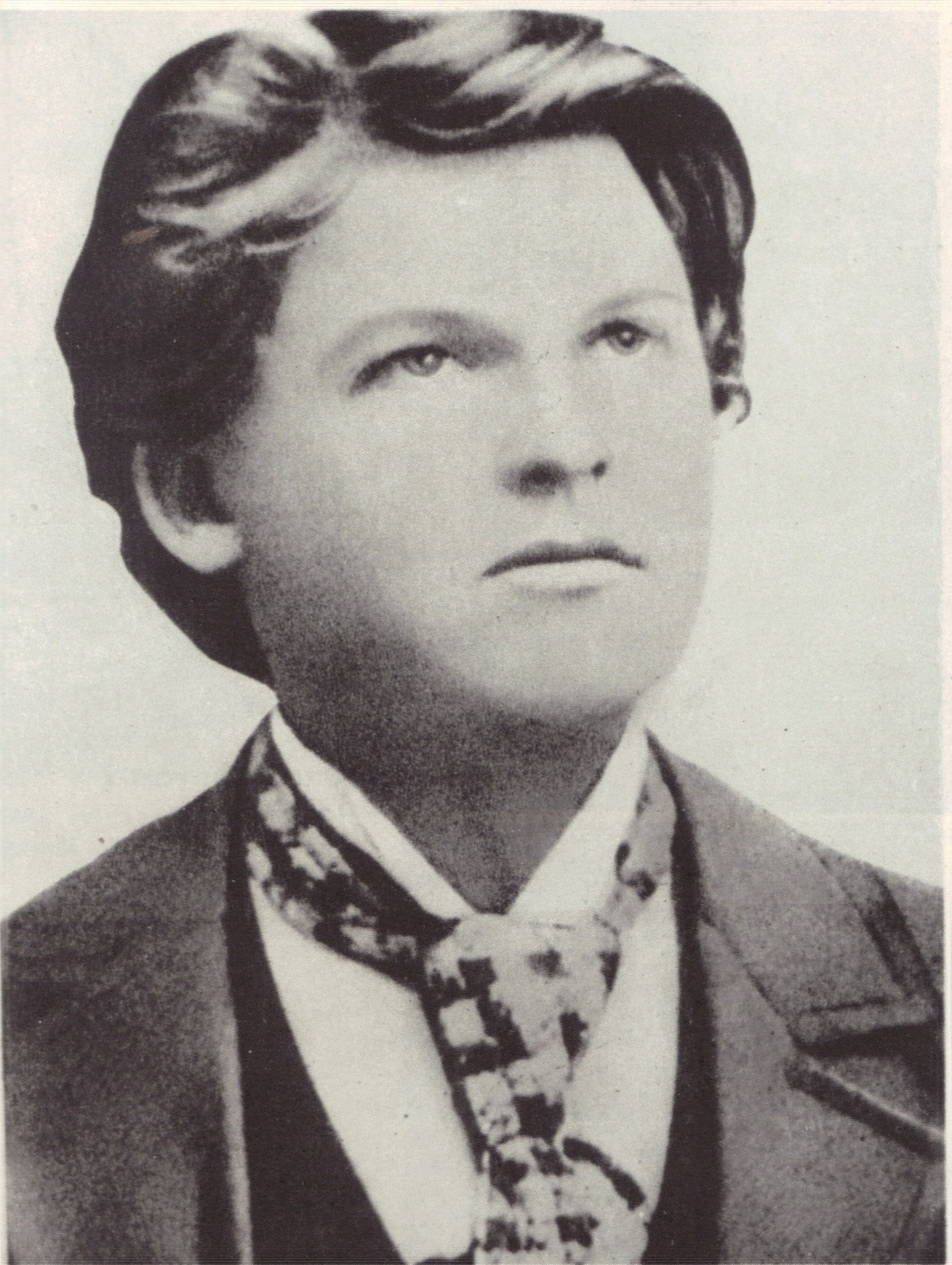
Mihail Sadoveanu in 1898.

Sadoveanu played a significant role in the preparatory work, enlisting the help of his friends from Viața Românească. The constituent meeting took place as scheduled, in the amphitheater of Gheorghe Lazăr High School, under Anghel's direction. Twenty-five writers attended, while another twenty-five, who were then in other parts of the Romanian Old Kingdom or in Bukovina and Transylvania, gave their proxy votes to attendees or sent letters of affiliation. Newspaper accounts slightly differ, with some reporting a total of 47 participants. Of the twenty 1908 society founders, sixteen were present. The meeting discussed the society's name, elected the committee, and drafted a plan of action. The name of the Romanian Writers' Society (SSR) was chosen and its objectives of defending and aiding writers were defined. Members were divided into categories of active, honorary, and donors. One of the criteria for active membership was holding Romanian citizenship, which presented a problem for many participants from Transylvania, Bukovina, and Macedonia who were foreign nationals. It was decided that older writers and leading critics would be invited to join, with the exception of Iorga, due to his "negative and offensive" attitude; they would be free to choose between active and honorary status. The elected committee consisted of Sadoveanu as president, Anghel as vice president, Gârleanu as secretary and librarian, Artur Stavri, Octavian Goga, Iosif, Chendi, Ion Minulescu, Zaharia Bârsan as members, and Lovinescu and Pavelescu as accountants. To give the society a more permanent character, it decided to organize literary meetings in towns and rural areas, as well as in Transylvania and Bukovina, acquire a headquarters, publish a bulletin, and gain legal recognition.

== Early years ==
In the following months, the committee offered the honorary presidency to Queen Elisabeth and attempted to attract older writers. Of these, Alexandru Vlahuță appeared most sensitive to the problems of younger writers. After obtaining a pledge of financial aid from Minister Spiru Haret, he launched a public appeal for a writers' publishing house in the Universul newspaper. He believed the press should operate under its own committee, formed by Vlahuță's generational colleagues. The SSR committee rejected the project, which later failed. Notable writers such as Titu Maiorescu, Ioan Slavici, Barbu Ștefănescu Delavrancea, and Ion Luca Caragiale kept their distance from the new organization. Rădulescu-Motru's political views led to his departure, but Mihail Dragomirescu joined in 1911.

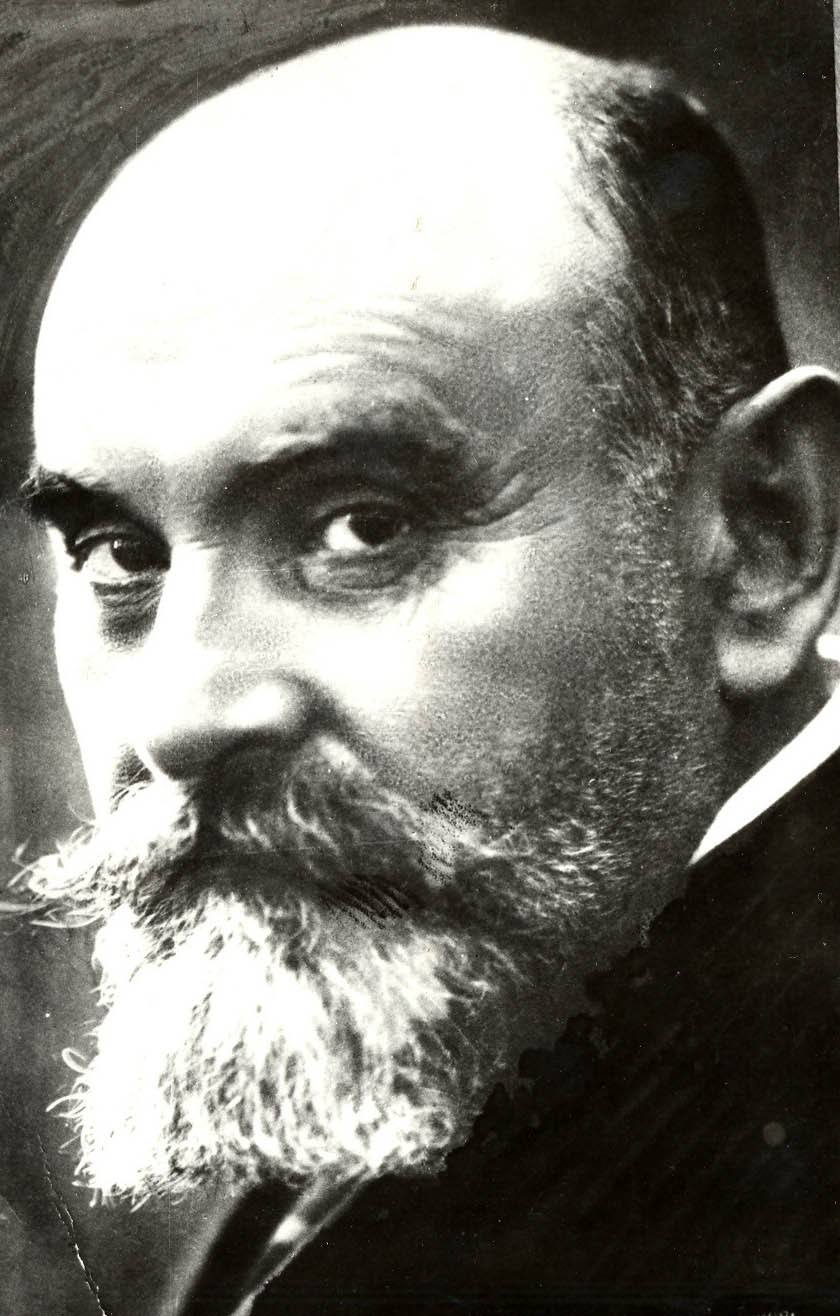
Constantin Dobrogeanu-Gherea, a critic of the organization.

Upon being invited to join, Imperial Russian-born Jewish critic Constantin Dobrogeanu-Gherea wrote an open letter to Anghel, lamenting that membership was based not on the value of one's work but on one's birth certificate. He ironically observed that he could not obtain it, as a trip to Russia would be hazardous for him. Anghel replied that Gherea could join, as he held Romanian citizenship. However, a number of non-citizen Jewish writers and critics sided with Gherea, creating an unfavorable atmosphere for the SSR. Amid rising polemics, in January 1910, the society asked the Romanian Parliament to reject a law granting citizenship to Jewish critic Eugen Porn. The appearance of Cumpăna magazine, edited by four SSR leaders (Anghel, Chendi, Iosif, and Sadoveanu), appeared to be a secessionist gesture and nearly led to the society's dissolution. The break in friendship between Anghel and Iosif also proved unfortunate.

Nevertheless, the SSR remained active, organizing meetings in Ploiești, Buzău, Galați, and Piatra Neamț, as well as a tour through Bukovina within its first six months. A temporary headquarters, with a library and donated artistic objects, was set up in a hotel apartment, but it was destroyed by fire in January 1911. Conferences in Transylvania's Sibiu (March 1911) and Arad (April–May 1911) proved invigorating and had a notable impact on the Romanian literary scene. The second general meeting, held that November, saw the admission of at least 37 new members, including Alexandru Macedonski, Ioan Alexandru Brătescu-Voinești (later considered a founder), Duiliu Zamfirescu, and Dragomirescu, as well as young writers like Tudor Arghezi, Gala Galaction, and Nicolae Davidescu. A new committee was chosen, with Gârleanu as president. Soon, a law recognizing the SSR as a legal entity was adopted, coming into effect in March 1912. Henceforth, it could receive donations and subsidies. A first subsidy, granted by Constantin C. Arion, amounted to 3000 lei and was divided among the members. An almanac for 1912 and 1913 was printed, although the planned bulletin had yet to appear.

The society continued to consolidate after its November 1912 congress, when Dragomirescu was elected president. Although Alexandru Davila, Brătescu-Voinești, Anghel, Natalia Anghel, Sadoveanu, and his colleagues from Iași (some of whom later returned) subsequently withdrew, ten new members joined in 1912, eighteen in 1914, and ten in 1915. The first bulletin was published in 1916, noting that in June 1915, at the end of George Diamandy's first term as president, there were 108 members, including 33 founders. However, this number was incorrect, as six founders were omitted, which was later corrected. The SSR accumulated wealth due to the annual 3,000-leu subsidy, a bequest of 10,000 lei from the late King Carol I, membership fees, and admission fees to lectures and theatrical shows. By the mid-1910s, society began commemorating deceased writers and building monuments in their honor.

== World War I ==
The society's activities diminished once Romania entered World War I in 1916. Its presidents during the war and its aftermath were Zamfirescu (1916), Sadoveanu (1917–1919), and Dragomirescu (1919–1921). During Dragomirescu's tenure, the congress in March 1920 decided to expel writers proven to have collaborated with the pro-German press during the wartime occupation of Bucharest. However, this measure was not implemented, as individuals such as Arghezi, Galaction, and Dem. Theodorescu continued to appear in the membership lists.

== Interwar period ==
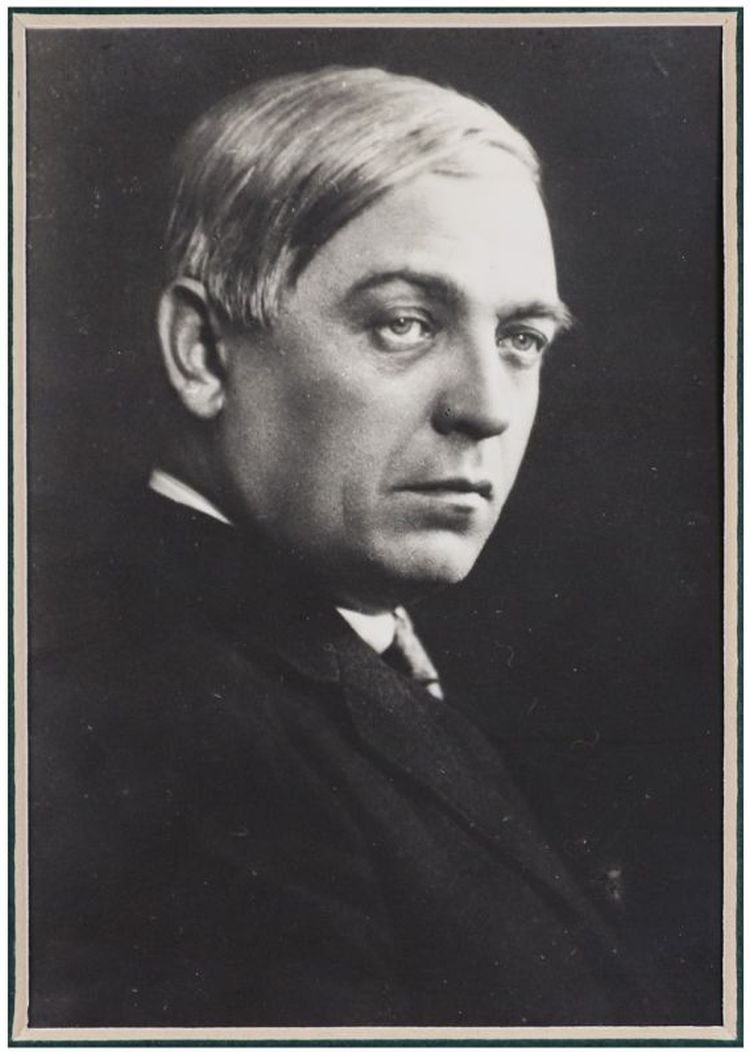
Liviu Rebreanu, president from 1925 to 1932.

Following the 1918 union of Transylvania, the Banat, Bukovina, and Bessarabia with Romania, there was a significant influx of new members. Moldovanu, who served as president from 1921 to 1923, even declared that he wanted all Romanian writers to join. At the beginning of his second term, there were 223 active members, with another 40 joining during the subsequent presidencies of Sadoveanu (1923–1924) and Goga (1925).

Liviu Rebreanu later became president, serving until February 1932. During his term, there was an attempt to address the issue of numerous dilettantes who had become members. The statutes were modified, and committees were established to remove those who did not fulfill the admission conditions. A 1928 list reveals that as of January 1925, there were 18 honorary and 155 active members; by the beginning of 1939, there were 239 active members.

The prestige that the SSR had acquired ensured that a secessionist group founded by Romulus Dianu in 1933, the Association of Independent Writers, proved to be a failure, and regional writers' groups in Oltenia, Transylvania, and Bessarabia remained of marginal importance. Thanks to the importance of contemporary writers and the symbolic capital acquired by some of them, such as Goga, Alexandru Lapedatu, Ion Pillat, Nichifor Crainic, Rebreanu, and Mihai Ralea, as well as their presence in influential government and legislative posts, the SSR received a series of subsidies from certain ministries (Education, Arts, Finance, Labor, Interior) as well as other institutions. In certain years, funding also came from the profits of the Constanța Casino, fees received during the month-long festival of Bucharest, and fairly generous sums paid by studios for film censorship.

After many unfulfilled promises, in 1934, the city hall granted a lot for a Writers' Palace, centrally located on Carol I Boulevard and valued at around 4.5 million lei. The following year, a building fund was set up under the initiative of Nicolae M. Condiescu, who served as president from 1935 to 1939. Due to generous donations from Condiescu's associate King Carol II, as well as from ministries and banks, the fund quickly reached 6.8 million lei.

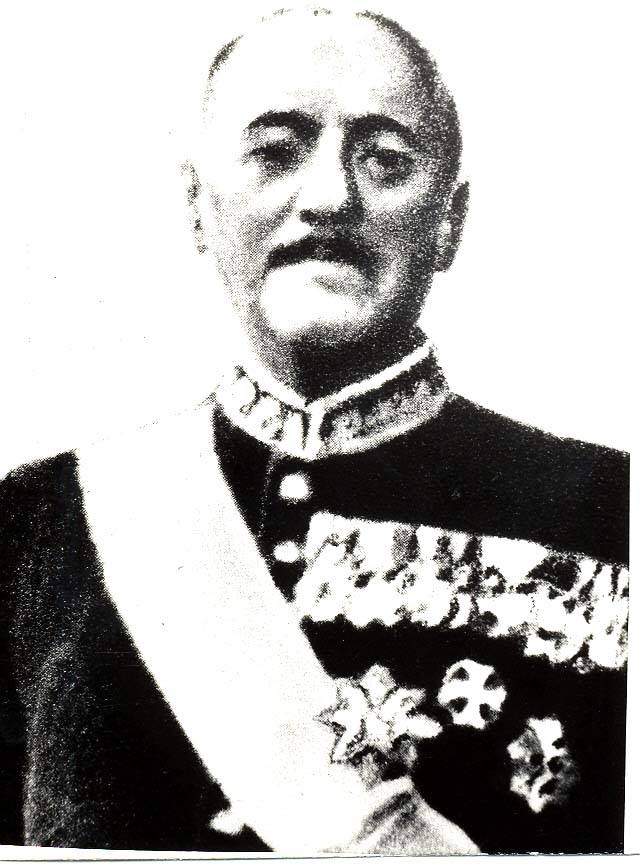
Nicolae M. Condiescu, president from 1935 to 1939.

Membership fees, tickets to conferences and plays, and admissions to balls represented only a small part of SSR's revenue. The society tried its hand in various businesses, including a lottery, two movie theaters (in Brașov and Arad), postcards with famous writers' faces, and medals, which either resulted in small revenues or losses. In 1931, the failure of the Marmorosch Blank Bank severely impacted the society, which had deposits of over 10 million lei, of which only a small part was recovered. Nevertheless, the SSR managed to somewhat meet its statutory objectives with the remaining funds.

Starting just after World War I, the society granted pensions to the widows and children of deceased writers (Macedonski, Chendi, George Coșbuc, Gârleanu, Slavici and Panait Istrati, as well as to the sisters of Mihail Eminescu). It also financed writers who found themselves in difficult situations, such as Maria Cunțan, Ion Gorun, Panait Mușoiu, Artur Enășescu, Eugen Boureanul, Caton Theodorian, Alexandru Obedenaru and George Bacovia. In 1939, this burden was somewhat alleviated when the Ralea-led Labor Ministry founded the Writers' Pension Fund. Every year, the society gave out aid that amounted to almost twice what it paid in pensions. From 1929 to 1931, two travel grants of 50,000 lei each were awarded, and another one was given for 1936–1937. The SSR granted Căile Ferate Române rail passes to its members and funded rest trips to the Sâmbăta de Sus palace and the main hotel in Bușteni. In 1936, the Bucharest city hall decided to grant house lots to five writers annually, but the measure ended up being purely financial. A substantial annual expenditure for the SSR were loans it provided to its members which were rarely paid back on time.

=== Prizes ===
The society's prizes served a dual purpose: providing material rewards for writers and building their reputations. According to a 1924 statute, the prizes were divided into two categories: those established by the society itself and those initiated by private individuals, institutions, or authorities on the society's behalf. The first category included three annual prizes; the first two were for poetry and prose, while the third had varying purposes such as debut works, translation, or sonnets. The second category included other prizes, generally more substantial: the I. Al. Brătescu-Voinești prize for the novel (20,000 and later 25,000 lei); the C. A. Rosetti prize, started by Viitorul newspaper (20,000 lei); the Socec prize for poetry, from 1924 to 1930 (10,000 lei); the King Carol II prize, from 1934 to 1940 (25,000 lei). Others came from private donations, such as the Ștefan I. Costacopol prize for criticism, involving 6000 lei and awarded from 1931 to 1945; or from prize money that was returned. The statute specified that the awarding committee was to be selected by the SSR leadership. The interwar press was rife with disgruntled comments and contestations of successive prize committees, but overall, very few obvious mistakes were made.

The prose prize went to: Calistrat Hogaș (1922), Gheorghe Brăescu (1923), Lucia Mantu, Jean Bart and Rebreanu (1924), Henriette Yvonne Stahl, Brăescu and Davidescu (1925), Boureanul, Rebreanu and I. A. Bassarabescu (1926), Boureanul, Vasile Demetrius and Savel (1927), Hortensia Papadat-Bengescu, Emanoil Bucuța and Ion Foti (1928), I. C. Vissarion, Davidescu and Demetrius (1929), Alexandru Cazaban, Brăescu and Mateiu Caragiale (1930), Ion Petrovici and Camil Petrescu (1931), Sergiu Dan and George Mihail Zamfirescu (1932), G. M. Vlădescu and Galaction (1933), Mircea Damian and Victor Ion Popa (1934), Anton Holban, Neagu Rădulescu, Horia Furtună, Mihail Celarianu and Octav Dessila (1935), Papadat-Bengescu and Mircea Eliade (1936), Mircea Gesticone, Dauș and Ioan Missir (1938), Zamfirescu and Radu Boureanu (1939).

The poetry prize recipients were: George Gregorian and Al. T. Stamatiad (1922), Claudia Millian and G. Talaz (1923), Davidescu and Moldovanu (1924), Foti, Constantin Râuleț and Adrian Maniu (1925), Aron Cotruș, Ion Dongorozi, Radu Gyr and Bacovia (1926), Perpessicius, George Dumitrescu, Artur Enășescu and Pillat (1927), Vasile Voiculescu, Zaharia Stancu and Boureanu (1928), Celarianu, Arghezi and Talaz (1929), Ion Barbu, Lucian Blaga and Eugen Jebeleanu (1930), Eugeniu Sperantia and Stamatiad (1931), Ilarie Voronca, D. Nanu and Virgil Gheorghiu (1932), Boureanu and Dan Botta (1933), Dumitrescu, N. Crevedia, Simion Stolnicu and Maria Banuș (1934), Mircea Streinul, Emil Gulian, Maniu and Vlaicu Bârna (1935), Ștefan Baciu (1936), Iulian Vesper, Teofil Lianu and Șerban Bascovici (1938), Celarianu, Emil Giurgiuca, Gyr and Aurel Chirescu (1939).

During the same period, the society hosted or participated in events to commemorate deceased writers and celebrate living ones for various occasions. Relations with PEN International and foreign writers' societies were strengthened, with representatives welcomed to Romania. Likewise, SSR committee members were invited to societies and congresses abroad.

== World War II ==
The outbreak of World War II had significant ramifications for the society's activities. At the time, its president was N. I. Herescu, who took over after Condiescu's death. Following substantial territorial losses by Romania during the summer of 1940, a significant number of writers became refugees. They received aid from the society, which dramatically depleted its funds.

After the National Legionary State came to power that September, the committee aligned itself with regime policy, and in early October decided to expel eleven Jewish writers: Felix Aderca, Camil Baltazar, Dan, A. Dominic, Scarlat Froda, Virgil Monda, I. Peltz, Mihail Sebastian, Leopold Stern, A. Toma and Voronca. The project for a Writers' Palace was temporarily abandoned, with its fund loaned for the benefit of the army. (The promissory notes probably became invalid after the nationalization of the banks in June 1948.) Due to a fall in subsidies and other revenue and a rise in aid and loans disbursed, the number of prizes awarded fell. Thus, the only honorees were Nicolae Ottescu, Ruxanda Levente, George Lesnea, Pompiliu Constantinescu, Gheorghiu, George Ionescu and Bascovici in 1940; Stahl, Demetrius, Alexandru Busuioceanu, Eugen Bălan, Radu Tudoran, Dumitru Almaș, Dragoș Protopopescu, Otilia Cazimir, Ion Buzdugan and Stelian Constantin-Stelian, in 1941; Alexandru Al. Philippide, Mihail Șerban, Cotruș, Ovidiu Papadima, Boureanu, Octav Sargețiu, Mircea Mărcoiu and Laura Dragomirescu in 1942. The society continued to maintain relations with similar bodies in Italy, Germany, Spain, France, Croatia, Slovakia and Finland.

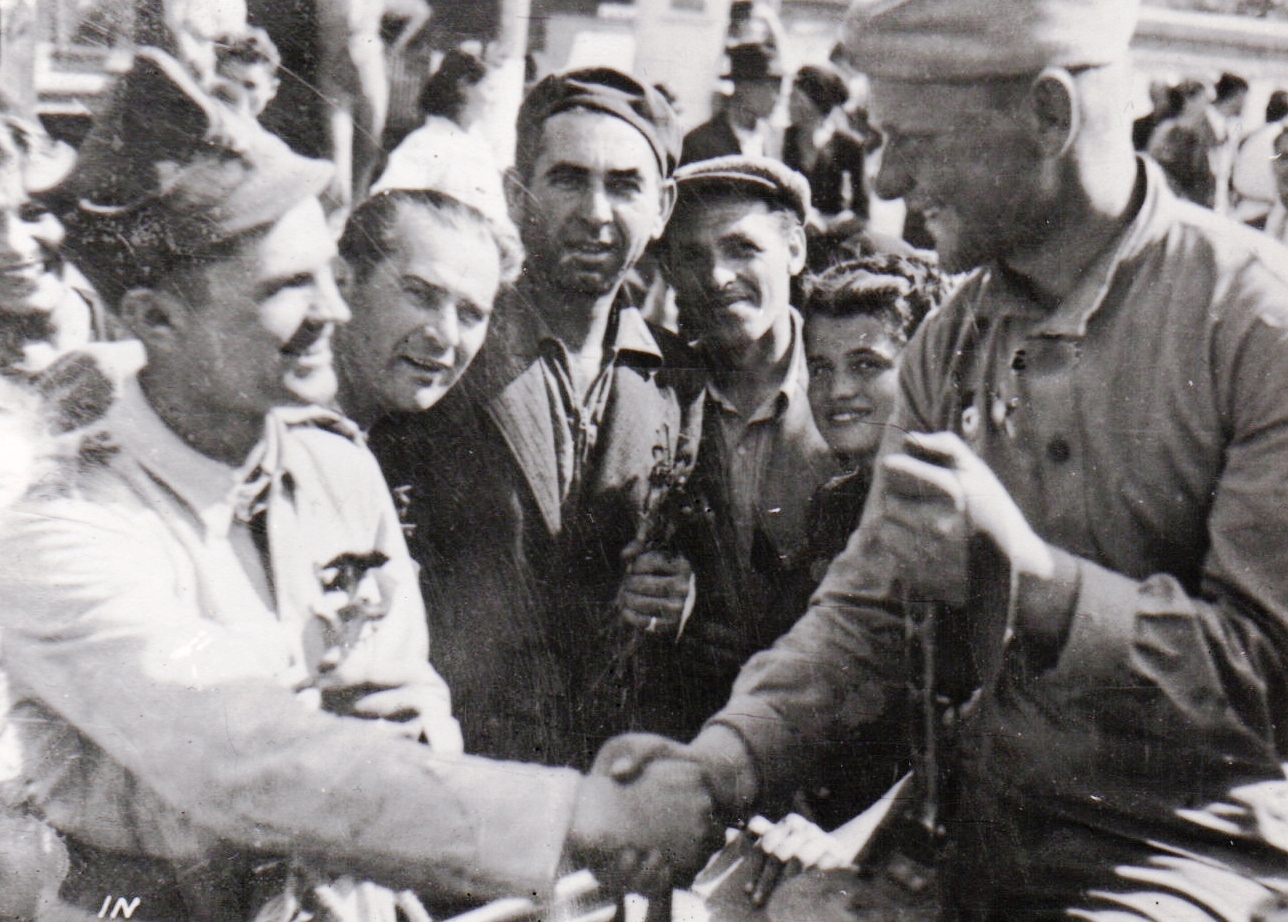
Romanian and Soviet soldiers shaking hands in Bucharest after the coup, 30 August

The events of 23 August 1944 forced another radical change for the society. In early September, a group of thirty writers called for a general assembly, citing the absence of Herescu (who was abroad and unable to return) and the presence in the committee of individuals compromised by collaboration with the deposed Ion Antonescu regime. The meeting occurred later in the month, and despite the absence of many members who did not reside in Bucharest, it was declared valid. The assembly, attended by the Jewish writers removed in 1940, elected a new committee, with the most votes going to the list headed by Victor Eftimiu as president. The new committee members were N. D. Cocea, Papadat-Bengescu, Cezar Petrescu, Cazaban, Celarianu, Stancu (who resigned and was replaced by Perpessicius), Mihai Beniuc, Lucia Demetrius, Boureanu, Cicerone Theodorescu and Jebeleanu.

By the end of November, successive meetings of the committee had resulted in an unknown number of expulsions, with a further 46 members suspended but given the possibility of accounting for their past deeds. The list presented in the 1945 bulletin indicates that 28 members were purged. Not among these were several who had already received public opprobrium (Davidescu, Crevedia, Marta Rădulescu), or those who had gone into voluntary exile (Cotruș, Eliade, Busuioceanu). In their place, Cocea proposed inviting 51 new members, of whom twenty mainly left-leaning individuals were accepted: Banuș, Ury Benador, Geo Bogza, George Călinescu, Ion Călugăru, Emil Dorian, Alexandru Kirițescu, Barbu Lăzăreanu, George Magheru, Alexandru Mironescu, Dinu Nicodin, Miron Radu Paraschivescu, Dan Petrașincu, Ion Pas, Alexandru Rosetti, George Silviu, Henric Sanielevici, Tudor Teodorescu-Braniște, Tudoran and Gheorghe Zane.

== Final years ==
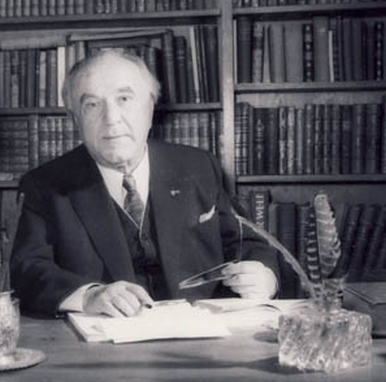
Victor Eftimiu, the last president of the Romanian Writers' Society.

By May 1945, Eftimiu justified the purges and welcomed the rising Soviet influence in response to the policies of the new Romanian Communist Party-dominated government. These policies aimed to transform the SSR into a tool for achieving the party's objective of a literary activity entirely subordinate to the authorities. Meanwhile, the society's professional role was largely ceded for a time to the Union of Artists', Writers' and Journalists' Syndicates, a body founded in August 1945. This organization, which was much easier to manipulate, began handling both material rewards and penalties, such as the purges of October 1947.

Following the membership overhaul of 1944–1945, the total number of affiliates rose to 268. A further 32 writers were admitted during the May 1946 congress, and probably as many were taken in at the September 1947 assembly that re-elected Eftimiu as president. The new committee also included Galaction, Cocea, Cezar Petrescu, Celarianu, Ion Popescu-Puțuri, Lucia Demetrius, Călugăru, Theodorescu, Dinu Bondi and Stancu as members; Carol Ardeleanu and Dumitru Corbea as accountants; Vintilă Russu-Șirianu, Bogza, Teofil Rudenco, Agatha Bacovia, Toma and C. Argeșanu as the honoring jury; and Baltazar, Aurel Baranga, Oscar Lemnaru, Tudor Șoimaru and Sașa Pană as alternate members.

During the same assembly, Stancu condemned those who were resisting the nascent regime and its cultural policies. Near the end of the month, a meeting of ethnic Hungarian writers in Cluj decided to join the SSR, leading the organization to change its name to the Society of Writers from Romania in January 1948. Stancu was elected to replace Eftimiu, who went on to chair the National Theatre Bucharest. In early 1949, a reorganization assembly was announced, which took place in late March, in the presence of the state and party leadership. The Society of Writers from the Romanian People's Republic was transformed into the Union of Writers from the Romanian People's Republic, now known as the Writers' Union of Romania. A new statute was adopted, and a literary fund was established.

== Presidents ==
- Mihail Sadoveanu (1909–1911)
- Emil Gârleanu (1911–1912)
- Mihail Dragomirescu (1912–1914)
- George Diamandy (1914–1916)
- Duiliu Zamfirescu (1916–1917)
- Mihail Sadoveanu (1917–1919)
- Mihai Dragomirescu (1919–1921)
- Corneliu Moldovanu (1921–1923)
- Mihail Sadoveanu (1923–1924)
- Octavian Goga (1924–1925)
- Liviu Rebreanu (1925–1932)
- Corneliu Moldovanu (1932–1935)
- Nicolae M. Condiescu (1935–1939)
- N. I. Herescu (1939–1944)
- Victor Eftimiu (1944–1948)
