= Statue of Mihai Eminescu, Galați =

Coordinates: 45°26′10″N 28°03′16″E

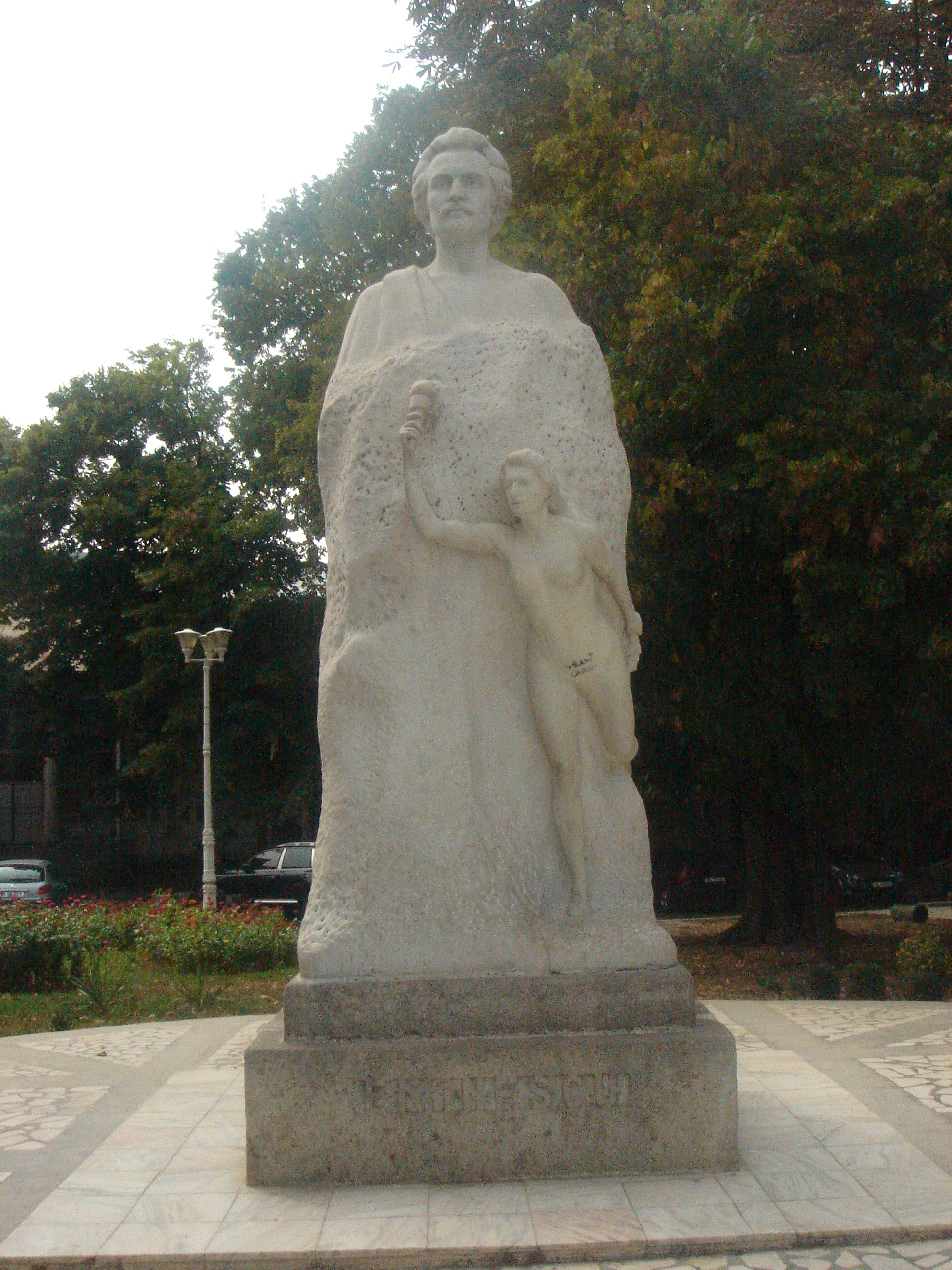
Statue of Mihai Eminescu

A statue of Mihai Eminescu in Galați, Romania, is located in Mihai Eminescu Park on Domnească Street.

== Preparations ==
In March 1909, an organizing committee was set up with the goal of commemorating 20 years since the death of poet Mihai Eminescu. Its members planned to finance a statue from sales of a book dedicated to Eminescu and a medallion, as well as through donations. The committee included Jean Bart and Henric Sanielevici. Press reports were favorable, except for Nicolae Iorga’s Neamul românesc, which commented ironically on Sanielevici.

Ion Scurtu helped promote the initiative in Bucharest. In June, the Romanian Writers' Society organized a fundraising event at the Papadopol Theater in Galați; participants included Mihail Sadoveanu, Cincinat Pavelescu, Ion Minulescu, Dimitrie Anghel and Eugen Lovinescu; attendance was somewhat sparse.

== Description and unveiling ==
By 1911, sufficient funds for the statue had been gathered. The commission was granted to Frederic Storck. Iorga wrote of the work: “instead of showing a gentleman in a jacket or even a frock”, similar to photographs of the poet, the sculptor “has made to arise from a large block of marble, given meaning by the blows of his hammer, a serene, gentle figure—not dreamy, but the grandly disarming portrait of the poet in the fullness of maturity, in complete control of his genius. An agile woman’s body unfolds from the stone, causing the flame of a torch to flutter—surely the symbol of the lively verses that the poet plucked from the harshness of his surrounding life”.

The unveiling, delayed by a cholera epidemic, took place in October 1911. It was widely reported by the local and national press. Two Romanian-language journals from Austria-Hungary, Românul of Arad and Luceafărul of Sibiu, sent delegations. Duiliu Zamfirescu represented the Romanian Academy, Education Minister Constantin C. Arion the government. Iorga, Anghel and Ioan A. Bassarabescu also spoke. Afterwards, a theatrical performance of an Émile Augier play, starring Maria Filotti, had verses by Eminescu interpolated. Others present that day included Sadoveanu, Minulescu, Bart, Emil Gârleanu, Alexandru Cazaban, Al. T. Stamatiad, Corneliu Moldovanu and Natalia Negru.

== Reaction and legacy ==
The festivities led to a rise in popularity of the city's Conservative Party, prompting attacks by the local National Liberal press. These began with criticism of Arion and the Junimists in power, continuing with epigrams and poems highlighting the Liberal viewpoint. At last, the opposition announced its intention to create a rival committee. This “non-partisan” body would ensure that the statue be moved “from its prosaic corner in the municipal park, surrounded by cafes, bars and tobacco stores, to the public garden, among the leaves of which the lonely poet sang with such affection”. The proposed finale would be a new, “dignified, purely cultural” inauguration presided by Alexandru Vlahuță, George Coșbuc and Ion Luca Caragiale.

While two earlier busts existed, the Galați monument is the oldest sculpture of Eminescu. Every year, commemorations are held to mark his birth (January 15) and death (June 15). Beginning in 1998, unknown persons have cut off the torch-bearing hand of the female figure, typically in the days before January 15. Despite the installation of security cameras, no one has ever been apprehended. Some 20 times, the hand has had to be replaced with a plaster replica. The statue is listed as a historic monument by Romania's Ministry of Culture and Religious Affairs.
