= Boureanu =

Boureanu or Boureanul is a Romanian surname. Notable people with the surname include:

- Cristian Boureanu (born 1972), Romanian businessman and politician
- Eugen Boureanul (1885–1971), Romanian writer
- Radu Boureanu, Romanian poet, prose writer, and translator
