= Silviu =

Silviu may refer to:

- Silviu Bălace (born 1978), Romanian football player
- Silviu Berejan (1927–2007), Bessarabian writer from Moldova and member of the Academy of Sciences of Moldova
- Silviu Bindea (1912–1992), Romanian football player
- Silviu Brucan (1916–2006), Romanian communist politician
- Silviu Casandra (born 1975), Romanian race walker
- Silviu Florea (born 1977), Romanian rugby union footballer
- Silviu Ilie (born 1988), Romanian football player
- Silviu Izvoranu (born 1982), Romanian football player
- Silviu Lung (born 1956), retired Romanian football goalkeeper
- Silviu Lung Jr. (born 1989), Romanian football player
- Silviu Manea (born 1983), Romanian ski mountaineer
- Silviu Ploeşteanu (1913–1969), Romanian footballer and manager
- Silviu Prigoană (born 1963), Romanian businessman and politician
- Silviu Simioncencu (born 1975), Romanian sprint canoeist and three-time world champion in the Canadian canoe events
- Silviu Simoncenco, Romanian sprint canoeist who has competed since 2007
- Ioan Silviu Suciu (born 1977), retired Romanian artistic gymnast
- George Silviu (1901–1971), Romanian writer
- Silviu Stănculescu (1932–1998), Romanian actor

== See also ==
- Silvius (disambiguation)
