= N. I. Herescu =

Niculae I. Herescu (December 5, 1906 – August 19, 1961) was a Romanian classical scholar, essayist, translator and poet. Descending from a noble family of Oltenia, he was trained in Latin and became a full professor at the University of Bucharest while still in his twenties. He translated widely from the Roman canon, as well as publishing a series of studies devoted to ancient writers. Meanwhile, Herescu wrote poetry of his own, and was president of the Romanian Writers' Society for several years. He left his native country shortly before a Soviet occupation began, and spent the last part of his life in exile, first in Portugal and then in France.

== Biography ==
=== Origins and early career ===
Born in Turnu Severin, his parents were Lieutenant Colonel Ion Herescu (later a General) and his wife Caterina (née Viișoreanu). His mother came from a landed Oltenian boyar family, and he was named after his maternal uncle, a judge. He attended high school in Craiova, followed by the classical languages section of the literature and philosophy faculty at the University of Bucharest. He attended specialty courses in Paris from 1927 to 1929, and obtained a Doctor of Letters degree in 1929. He taught Latin language and literature at Bucharest, as a teaching assistant (1929), associate professor (1932) and full professor (1935–1945). He was director of Bucharest's Institute of Latin Studies. Politically, he was affiliated with the Alexandru Averescu-led People's Party, in 1939 joining the leadership of the National Renaissance Front, the sole party under the royal dictatorship of King Carol II.

Herescu thrived under the dictatorship: in 1939, upon the death of Nicolae M. Condiescu, he was elected president of the Romanian Writers' Society, and would serve until 1944. Soon after, Carol offered him Condiescu's other post, that of secretary general of the Carol I Academic Foundation. (Presumably, Alexandru Rosetti, himself involved with the Foundation, coveted the position, and his correspondence on the topic with George Călinescu was laced with hostility and irony. When the latter remarked that Herescu "is no writer, is nothing", Rosetti replied "ex nihilo-nihil", a reference to the classicist's initials NIH.) To the end, he remained a regime supporter, sending the king a report on the Foundation's activities in July 1940, less than two months before Carol's abdication. There, he opined that the classical and Latin aspects of Romanian culture should be emphasized, in order to spur a renaissance. In an attack on Rosetti's editorial policy, he complained that important writers were being sidelined while "young men condemned by the courts and by the unanimity of critics for pornography are easily published", a reference to Geo Bogza. He also deemed Eugen Lovinescu's translations of the Odyssey and Aeneid as "execrable". When the National Legionary State came to power that autumn and examined whether university professors should be retained, the resulting report found fault with his meager scientific activity and affiliation with the previous regime. He was nevertheless kept on the faculty, with the condition that his research output demonstrate commitment to the new order during the next two years.

He was a member of the Academy of Moral and Political Sciences, as well as of the Parisian Société des Études Latines. He directed the Craiova-based publication Favonius from 1926 to 1928, as well as Bucharest's Revista clasică Orpheus. Favonius from 1929 to 1943. Together with Ion Pillat and Vasile Voiculescu, he edited the sole number of the poetry magazine Pleiada in 1934. His work, particularly translations from classical authors and essays about them, appeared in Adevărul literar și artistic, Cele trei Crișuri, Cuget clar, Familia, Flamura, Gândirea, Galeria artei, Năzuința, Orpheus, Ramuri, Revista Fundațiilor Regale, and Universul literar, as well as in foreign speciality journals (Acta Philologica, Orphaeus, Revue de philologie, Revue des études latines).

=== Exile and legacy ===
In July 1944, the month before the Soviet occupation of Romania began, Herescu, together with his wife and daughter, took a plane out of Băneasa Airport; he would never see his homeland again. His first stop, in Nazi Germany, was at the bombed-out Stuttgart Airport, where all his luggage, including manuscripts and money, caught fire. Herescu then reached Lisbon, where he was hosted by Mircea Eliade. Unable to support himself, he intended to return home during the next few months. He repeatedly asked the university authorities and the Education Ministry to prolong his leave of absence, transfer his salary or give him an official duty. However, his name appeared on the first list of those excluded from the university in January 1945, and his letter that August, refuting accusations of pro-German sentiment point by point, was ignored. Meanwhile, he was expelled from the Writers' Society (of which he had been president) in September 1944. He taught at the University of Lisbon from 1947 to 1948, but his contract was not renewed. Subsequently, moving to Paris, he worked at the Romanian section of French Radio. He continued to publish in his field, but was unable to relaunch a university career. Inside Romania, his work was suppressed by the Communist regime due to his hostile attitude toward it, and only began to see republication after the 1989 Revolution.

Herescu's first published poem, "Sonet", appeared in the Craiova magazine Năzuința in 1922. His translations of Aeschylus, Catullus, Horace, Plautus, Tibullus, and Virgil have been described as among the finest in Romanian. In his studies and essays, he took care to render classical values accessible to a wide public (Pentru clasicism, 1937; Caete clasice, 1941; Milliarium, vol. I-II, 1936–1941) or to make erudite contributions in the field of ancient literature (especially those published abroad: Catullo, 1943; Punti di vista sulla lingua di Tito-Livio, 1943; Ovidiana, 1958, in collaboration; La poésie latine, 1960; Style et hasard, 1963). His bibliographic works are of fundamental importance: Bibliographie de la littérature latine (1943), Bibliografia clasică în România (in collaboration, 1943). Together with Pillat, he translated Poezii alese din Francis Jammes (1927). His original poems were generally rustic idylls in the Horatian manner that resembled Pillat's style: Basmul celor patru zodii (1926), Cartea cu lumină (1926). In 1961, under the pen name Charles Séverin (a reference to his birthplace), he published L'agonie sans mort, a French-language roman à clef dealing with the exile experience. Its author's identity soon pinpointed by Virgil Ierunca, the book appeared in Romanian in 1998, as Agonie fără moarte. Later in 1961, Herescu died unexpectedly in Zürich, aged 54.
