= Octav Șuluțiu =

Romanian prose writer and literary critic

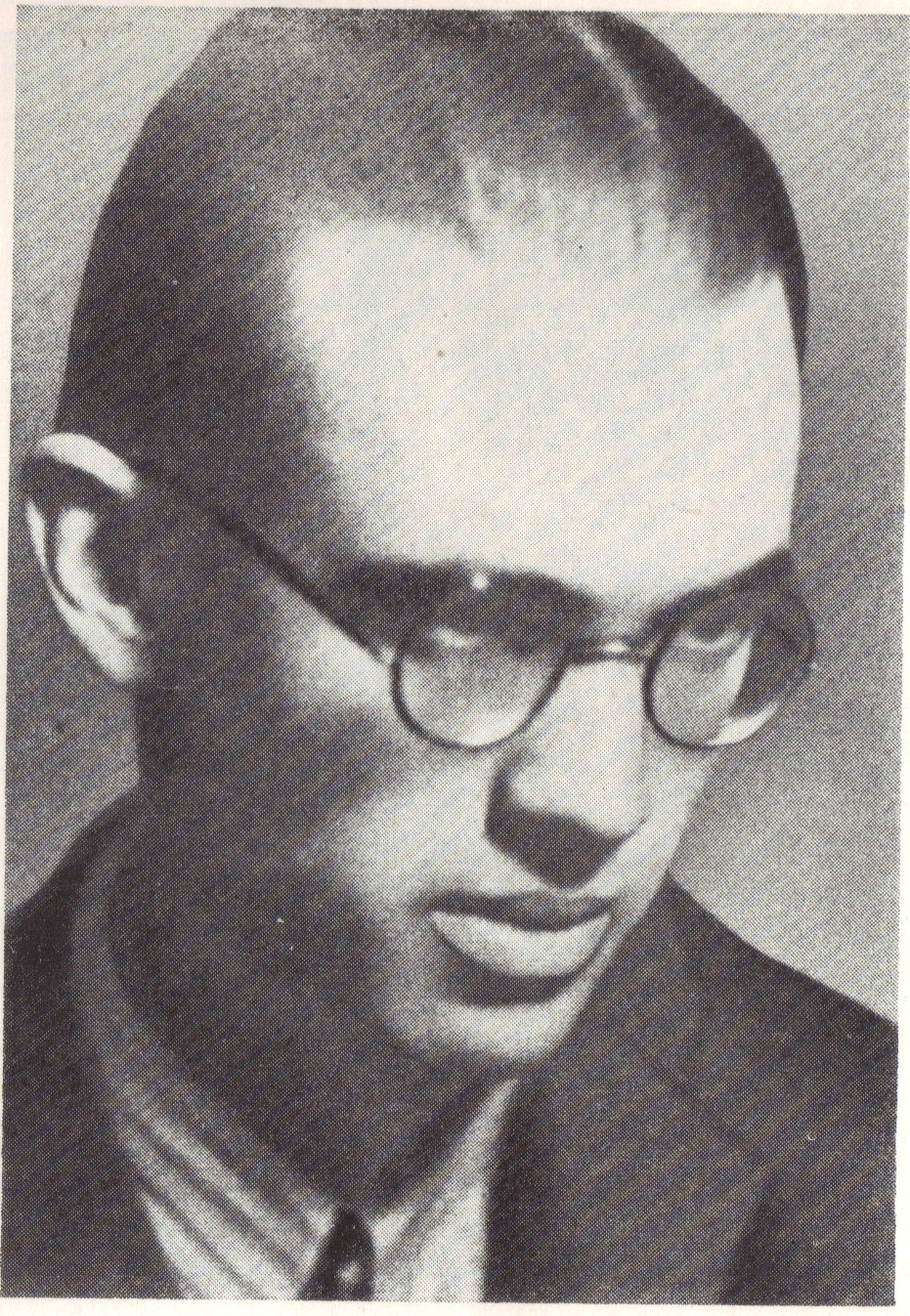
Șuluțiu in 1935

Octav Șuluțiu (November 5, 1909 – February 9, 1949) was a Romanian prose writer and literary critic.

Born in Bucharest, his parents were Gheorghe Șuluț, a tailor, and his wife Victoria (née Pigarovsky). After attending primary school and, from 1921 to 1926, gymnasium in his native city, he went to Mihai Viteazul High School on a scholarship, graduating in 1928. Șuluțiu earned a degree from the University of Bucharest's literature and philosophy faculty in 1931, having specialized in French and Romanian literature. That year, he was hired as a substitute French teacher at Unirea High School in Focșani. He later transferred to Oradea's Iosif Vulcan Normal School. In 1935, he was named provisional full professor at Andrei Șaguna High School in Brașov. In 1942, he became an inspector at the state department for extracurricular education. Șuluțiu then returned to Bucharest to teach French language and literature, working at Gheorghe Șincai (1946) and Mihai Viteazul (1947) high schools.

Șuluțiu's first published work was a 1927 article, "Primul romancier român", that appeared in Revista literară, published at Saint Sava High School. He contributed to Ultima oră, Propilee literare, Dreptatea, Bilete de Papagal, Săptămâna literară, Azi, Radical, Vremea, Reporter, Viața literară, Rampa, România Literară, Axa, Familia and Kalende. His novel Ambigen (1935) was received with praise, although the author complained of the critics' "frightening superficiality". Pe margini de cărți, a volume of literary criticism, came out in 1938; it was followed by the 1943 novel Mântuire, which was awarded a prize by the Romanian Writers' Society. In collaboration, he translated a novel by Elena Ilyina that appeared in 1946 as Al patrulea obstacol. In his last year, Șuluțiu worked to finalize a study, Despre poezia lui George Coșbuc. He died of a stroke.
