= Statue of Mihai Eminescu =

Statue of Mihai Eminescu may refer to:

- Statue of Mihai Eminescu, Galați
- Statue of Mihai Eminescu, Iași
- Statue of Mihai Eminescu, Montreal
