= Ioan Gheorghe Savin =

- Born: December 19, 1885; Jorăști, Galați County
- Died: February 22, 1973 (aged 87)
- Resting place: Cernica Monastery
- Education: University of Bucharest
- Employer(s): University of Iași; University of Bucharest
- Known for: Christian apologetics
- Criminal charges: Treason
- Criminal penalty: Imprisonment at Sighet Prison (1950–1955)
- Spouses: Natalia Negru (divorced) Lucia Avramescu (div. 1950) Cornelia Rădulescu (m. 1955)
- Father: Gheorghe Savin

Ioan Gheorghe Savin (December 19, 1885 – February 22, 1973) was a Romanian theologian, within the Romanian Orthodox Church. A professor and a widely published writer, he spent several years in prison under the early communist regime.

== Biography ==
A native of Jorăști, Galați County, he was the eleventh of thirteen children born to parish priest Gheorghe Savin and his wife Zoița. He began primary school in his native village in 1891, continuing in Bârlad. He entered a seminary at Roman in 1892 and at Iași in 1895. He attended seminary in Iași, followed by the theology faculty of the University of Bucharest from 1905 to 1909. Upon the proposal of his professor Irineu Mihălcescu, he was selected for a scholarship that allowed him to take specialized courses in philosophy and theology at Berlin and Heidelberg from 1910 to 1915. He obtained a doctorate under the supervision of Ernst Troeltsch. Savin saw combat as a second lieutenant in World War I. Afterwards, he taught Romanian and German at Bolhrad High School in the newly acquired Bessarabia province. In 1920, he was called to the national capital Bucharest to become inspector general at the Religious Affairs and Arts Ministry. He also accepted an invitation from his friend the minister, Octavian Goga, to help edit Cuvântul, a magazine the ministry published and distributed free to every parish. His only other government experience came from the end of 1937 to early 1938, when Goga, then prime minister, named him undersecretary of state at the Education Ministry. His first university post was at the University of Iași, where he taught at the theology faculty. From 1927 to 1941, he was a professor of philosophy of religion and apologetics at the theology faculty in Chișinău, serving as dean for a period. From 1941 to 1947, he taught at the University of Bucharest's apologetics department. In 1936, he took part in the Orthodox theology professors' congress at Athens. Through his efforts, introductory theology became a recognized branch of Romanian Orthodox theological education.

He wrote numerous books, studies, and articles, with a particular focus on apologetics. Savin's works sought to defend religious and moral values, addressing issues relevant to his day. He was also interested in dialogue between religion and science, as well as culture. The author of several anti-Bolshevik works, he was forced to retire in 1948, at the onset of the communist regime. Arrested in May 1950 by the Securitate secret police, he was charged with "intensive activity against the workers' movement" and sent to Sighet Prison, from which he was released in July 1955. In 1962, he was permitted to publish under his brother's name, and under his own name in 1970. Also in 1962, he was denied a pension because, as a theology professor, he had combated historical materialism. He died in 1973 and was buried at Cernica Monastery, Ilfov County.

His first wife was poet Natalia Negru, followed by Lucia Avramescu, who divorced him after his arrest. Upon his release, he married Cornelia Rădulescu, a native of the Banat.

One of his many disciples was the Orthodox Metropolitan of Transylvania, Antonie Plămădeală, who curated in 1996 two posthumous volumes of Savin's works.
