= Mircea Gesticone =

Romanian novelist and poet

Mircea Gesticone (May 3, 1902 – August 5, 1961) was a Romanian novelist and poet.

Born in Bucharest, he was the fifth child of Filip Gesticone and his wife Zamfira (née Ursachi). His father, a lawyer, came from a family of Ploiești merchants. His mother was descended from a family of small-scale leaseholders from Botoșani and was friends with Sofia Nădejde. Gesticone's education took place in his native city: Dinicu Golescu elementary school, the lower form of Mihai Viteazul High School, the upper form of Gheorghe Lazăr High School. At seventeen, he was admitted to the Bucharest Conservatory as a fourth-year student, but abandoned the study of music. He attended the law faculty of the University of Bucharest from 1922 to 1926, meanwhile taking courses at the Italian Institute of Culture. From 1923 to 1954, he was a clerk at Banca Românească. His first published poem, "Apotheose", appeared in La Roumanie nouvelle magazine in 1929. His first novel, Războiul micului Tristan, came out in 1937, and he was awarded the Romanian Writers' Society prize the same year. After his wife died in a tramway accident in 1948, he lived a withdrawn existence and abandoned writing.

== Works ==
- Războiul micului Tristan. Bucharest: Cultura Națională. 1937. OCLC 69072187.
- Vest. Bucharest: Editura Minerva. 1983. OCLC 17147391.
