= Emil Gulian =

Emil Gulian (1907–1942) was a Romanian poet.

Born in Giurgiu, he earned degrees in law and philosophy from the University of Bucharest and practiced as a lawyer. His first published work appeared in Universul literar at a time when Camil Petrescu was director. He contributed poems, prose and criticism to Universul literar, România Literară, Contimporanul, Vremea, Azi, Cuvântul, Convorbiri Literare and Rampa. He published a single poetry book, Duh de basm (1934). His poems, abstract and creating an impression of hermeticism, feature echoes of Ion Barbu's work. Nearly all are erotic, and describe a symbolic landscape in which vagueness, cold and abstraction are the forms through which a simulated melancholy manifests itself. Authors he translated include Edgar Allan Poe, Paul Claudel, Jules Supervielle, Valery Larbaud, François Mauriac and Georges Duhamel. He was awarded the Romanian Writers' Society prize in 1934. He was killed while fighting on the front during World War II.
