= Mihail Șerban (writer) =

Romanian writer

- Born: August 18, 1911; Fălticeni, Kingdom of Romania
- Died: July 9, 1994 (aged 82); Bucharest, Romania
- Education: University of Iași
- Occupation: Writer

Mihail Șerban (August 18, 1911 – July 9, 1994) was a Romanian prose writer.

Born in Fălticeni, his parents were Gheorghe Șerban, a clerk, and his wife Elena (née Verner). After attending the local Nicu Gane High School from 1923 to 1930, he studied at the law faculty of the University of Iași from 1930 to 1932. He then abandoned his studies and entered journalism, coming to Bucharest upon the encouragement of Eugen Lovinescu. Sequentially or simultaneously, he held a number of jobs: librarian and secretary's assistant at Mihai Viteazul High School (1934–1937), contributor and editor at Adevărul and Dimineața newspapers (1935–1938), editor at Cezar Petrescu's România, civil servant at the State Sub-secretariate for Propaganda (1938–1947), inspector at the theatre directorate and then the literary directorate of the Arts and Information Ministry (1947–1948), editor of Călăuza bibliotecarului and Îndrumătorul cultural (1949–1957), bibliographer at the Central State Library (until 1967). He was active in the Sburătorul literary circle. He died in Bucharest in 1994, at age 82.

Șerban's published debut took the form of poems and prose that appeared in Gazeta noastră in 1930. He also contributed to Adevărul literar și artistic, Vremea, Viața Românească, Revista Fundațiilor Regale, Cuvântul liber and Reporter. He wrote numerous volumes of short stories (Nunta de argint, 1938; Câinii, 1939; Cântecul uitat, 1942; Furtuna, 1948; Când doarme pământul, 1948) and novels (Idolii de lut, 1935; Infirmii, 1936; Grădina lui Dumnezeu, 1939; Sanda, 1941; Casa amintirilor, 1942; Fete bătrâne, 1946; Pâinea inimii, 1949; Pământ și oameni, 1957; Circul, 1972). Some appeared in several editions, while others were given awards: the Young Writers' Society Prize for Infirmii in 1936 and for Nunta de argint in 1939; the Arts Ministry granted him the Brătescu-Voinești Prize in 1942 for Casa amintirilor. His 1969 memoir, Amintiri, features his recollections of important interwar writers, including Ionel Teodoreanu, Damian Stănoiu, and Felix Aderca. Although his themes are not rural, Șerban's prose, due to its lyrical tone and passivity in the face of one's environment, features within the late Sămănătorist tradition.
