= Giurgiu =

City in southern Romania

- Municipality
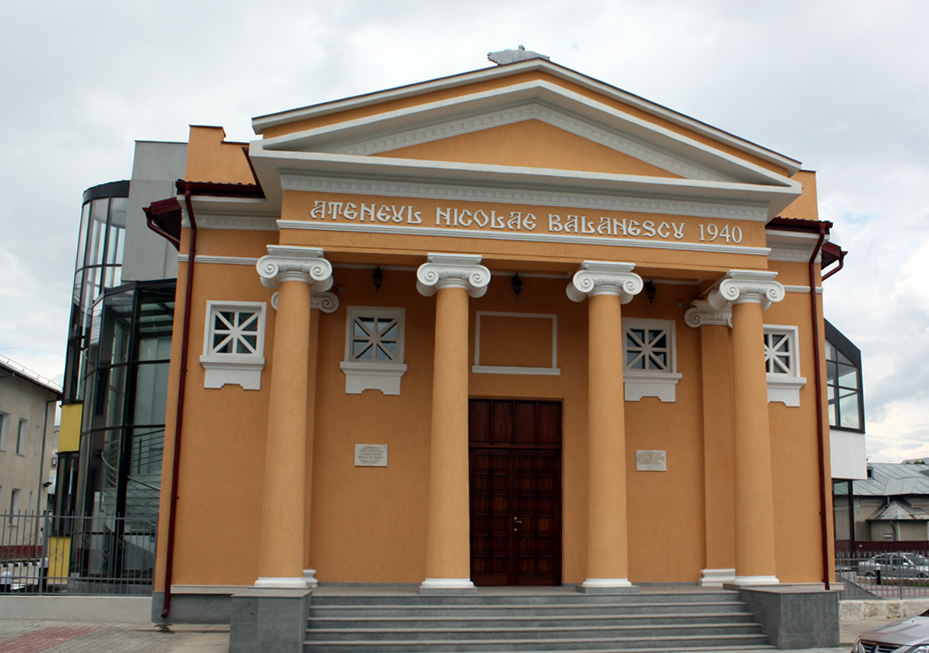
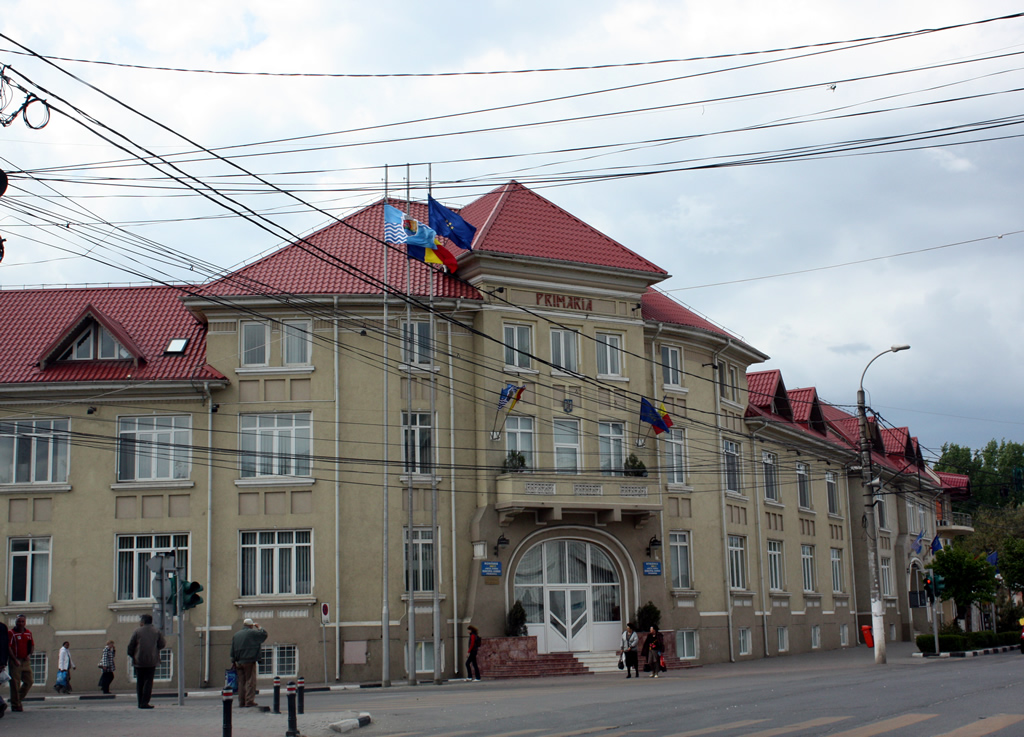
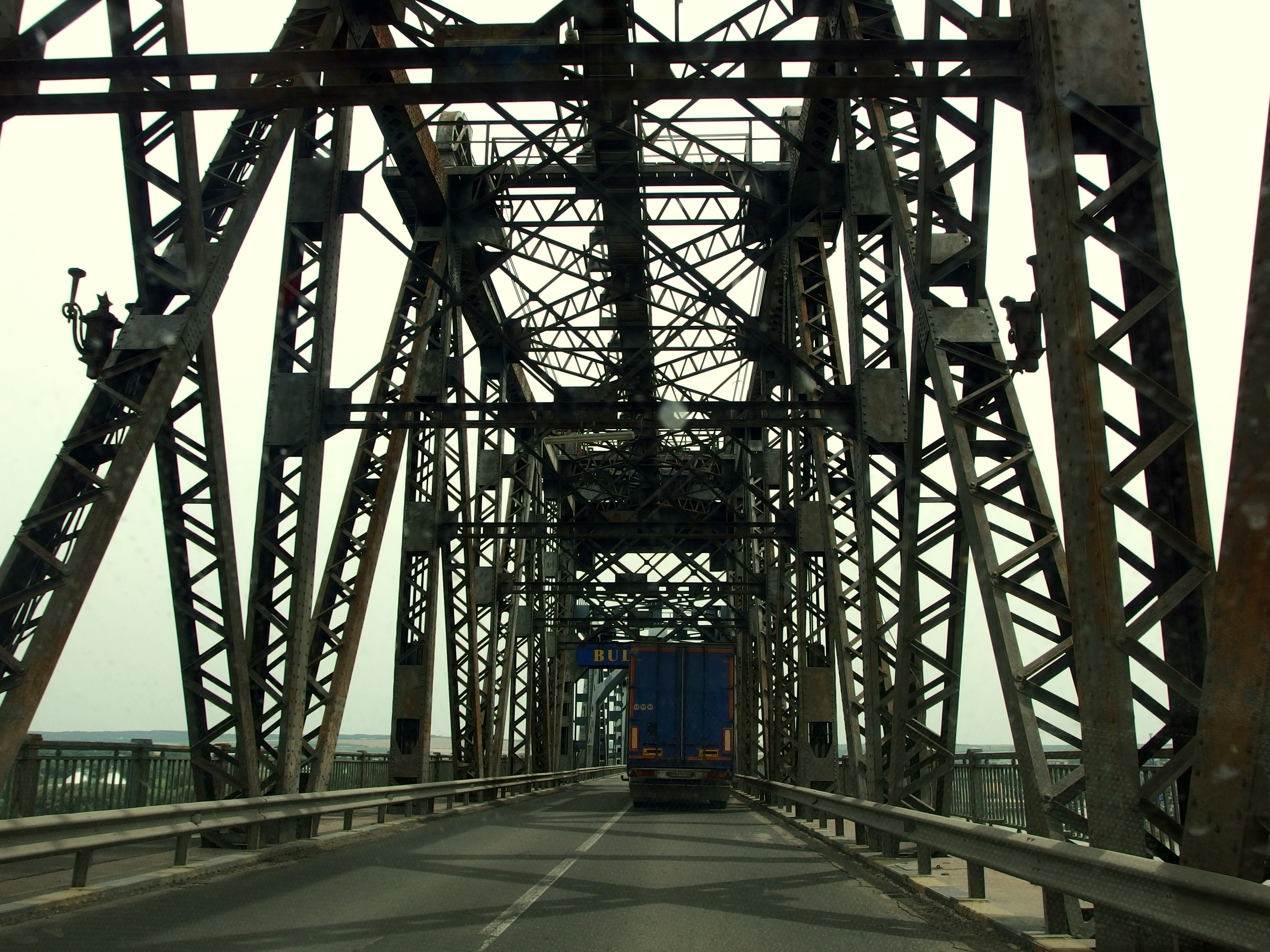
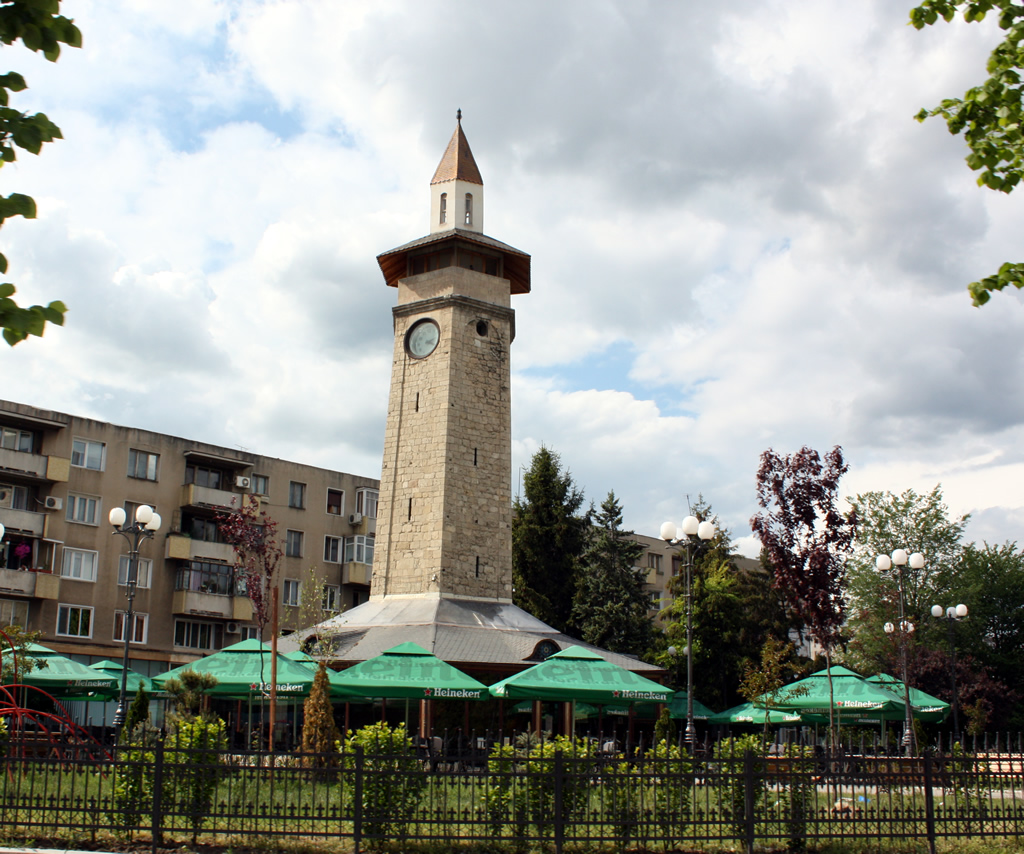
- Atheneum building Town Hall Danube Bridge Giurgiu Clock Tower

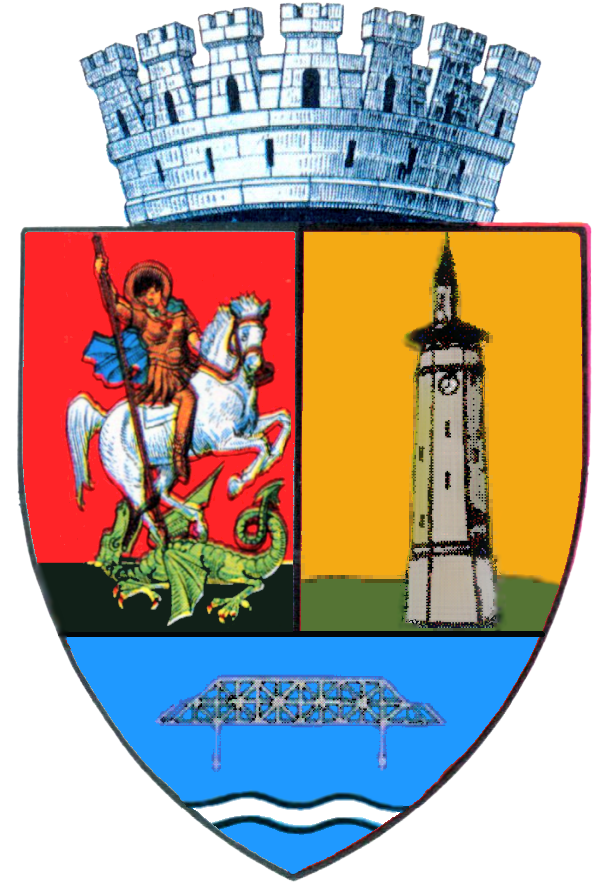
- Coat of arms

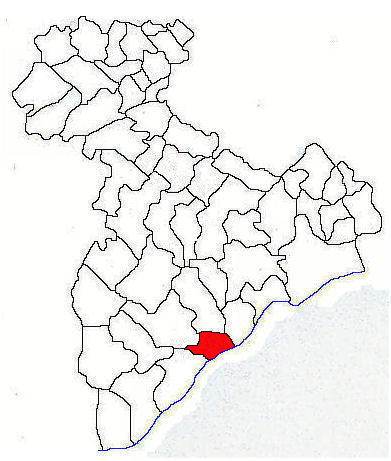
- Location in Giurgiu County

- Location in Romania
- Coordinates: 43°54′03″N 25°58′26″E
- Country: Romania
- County: Giurgiu

Government
  - Mayor (2024–2028): Adrian-Valentin Anghelescu (PNL)
- Area: 46.94 km^{2} (18.12 sq mi)
- Elevation: 25 m (82 ft)
- Population (2021-12-01): 54,551
  - Density: 1,162/km^{2} (3,010/sq mi)
- Time zone: UTC+02:00 (EET)
  - Summer (DST): UTC+03:00 (EEST)
- Postal code: 080011–080882
- Area code: (+40) 02 46
- Vehicle reg.: GR
- Website: primariagiurgiu.ro

Giurgiu (Romanian pronunciation: [ˈdʒjurdʒju]; Bulgarian: Гюргево, romanized: Gyurgevo; Turkish: Yergöğü) is a city in southern Romania. The seat of Giurgiu County, it lies in the historical region of Muntenia. It is situated amongst mud-flats and marshes on the left bank of the Danube facing the Bulgarian city of Ruse on the opposite bank. It is one of six Romanian county seats lying on the river Danube. Three small islands face the city, and a larger one shelters its port, Smarda. The rich grain-growing land to the north is traversed by a railway to Bucharest, the first line opened in Romania, which was built in 1869 and afterwards extended to Smarda. In the past, Giurgiu exported timber, grain, salt and petroleum, and imported coal, iron, and textiles.

The Giurgiu-Ruse Friendship Bridge, in the shared Bulgarian-Romanian section of the Danube, crosses the river in the outskirts of the city.

== History ==
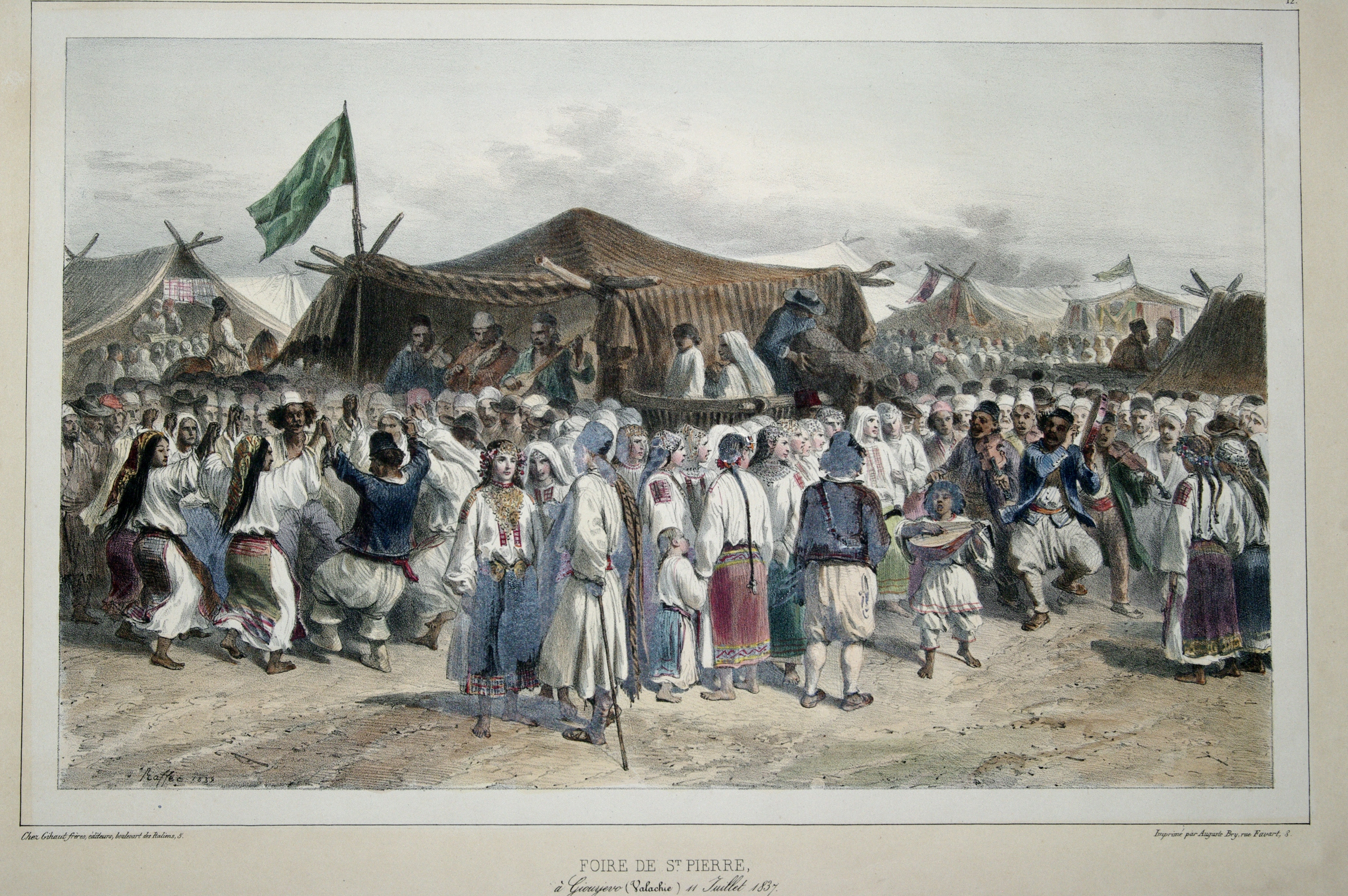

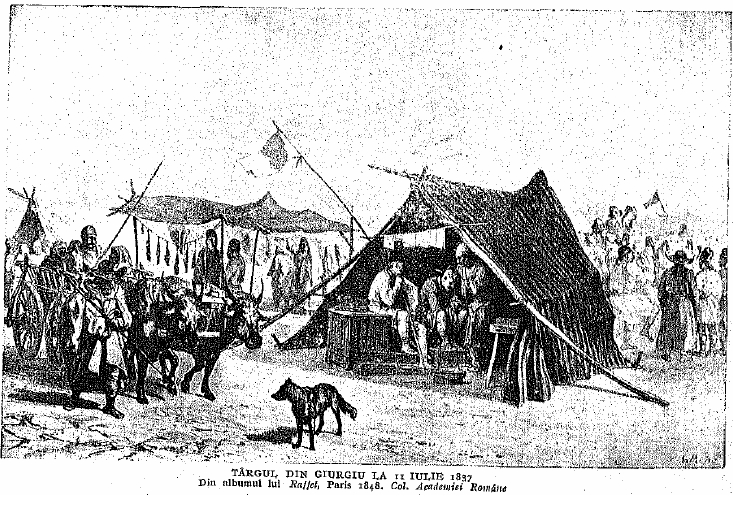
Giurgiu in 1837

The area around Giurgiu was densely populated at the time of the Dacians (1st century BC) as archeological evidence shows, and Burebista's capital was in this area (it is thought to be in Popești on the Argeș River). During Roman times this was the site of Theodorapolis, a city built by the Roman emperor Justinian (483–565).

The city of Giurgiu was probably established in the 14th century as a port on the Danube by the Genoese merchant adventurers, who established a bank and traded in silks and velvets.

One theory is that they called the city after the patron saint of Genoa, San Giorgio (Saint George), however Nicolae Iorga disputes this theory, arguing that Giurgiu is just an old Romanian form of George.

It was first mentioned in Codex Latinus Parisinus in 1395, during the reign of Mircea the Elder, and was conquered by the Ottomans in 1420 as a way to control the Danube traffic. The Ottomans named the city Yergöğü, as if from yer 'earth' + gök 'sky,' but the name was probably given because of the similarity between the pronunciations of "(San) Giorgio" and "Yergöğü".

As a fortified city, Giurgiu figured often in the wars for the conquest of the lower Danube. It was the site of the October 1595 Battle of Giurgiu, and figured in the struggle of Michael the Brave (1593–1601) against the Turks and in the later Russo-Turkish War (1787–1792). It was burned in 1659. In 1771, the Ottomans built the historic Giurgiu Clocktower as a surveillance tower for Danube traffic. In 1829, its fortifications were finally razed, the only defence left being a castle on the island of Slobozia, connected to the shore by a bridge.

In 1952–1954, during the Communist regime, the Soviet Union helped build the bridge between Giurgiu and Ruse, The Friendship Bridge, a bridge on the Danube linking Romania and Bulgaria.

=== Jewish history ===
Sephardi Jewish merchants came to Giurgiu from the Balkans in the 1820s and Ashkenazi Jews settled later, leading to communal disputes. A 70-member Zionist group was formed in 1899. A joint Jewish school opened in 1878, with 60 pupils in 1910. The Jewish population by that point was 533, or 4% of the total. By 1930, their number had fallen to 207, or 0.7%. Jews were forced to forfeit their property to the Iron Guard in 1941 and at least half of the 113 Jews living there that year left. A community existed after World War II.

== Demographics ==
Historical population
Year	Pop.	±%
1859	10,557	—
1900	13,977	+32.4%
1912	20,629	+47.6%
1930	31,016	+50.4%
1941	26,551	−14.4%
1948	30,197	+13.7%
1956	32,613	+8.0%
1966	39,199	+20.2%
1977	51,544	+31.5%
1992	74,191	+43.9%
2002	69,587	−6.2%
2011	54,655	−21.5%
2021	54,551	−0.2%
Source: Census data, 1930–1948.

According to the 2021 census, Giurgiu had a population of 54,551; of those, 81.5% were Romanians and 4.05% Roma.

== Local politics and administration ==
Giurgiu is administered by a mayor, Adrian-Valentin Anghelescu of the National Liberal Party (in office since October 2020) and a city council consisting of 21 councilors which has the following political composition, based on the results of the 2024 local elections:

Party	Seats	Current Council
National Liberal Party (PNL)	10	
Social Democratic Party (PSD)	7	
Alliance for the Union of Romanians (AUR)	3	
Save Romania Union (USR)	1	

== Economy ==
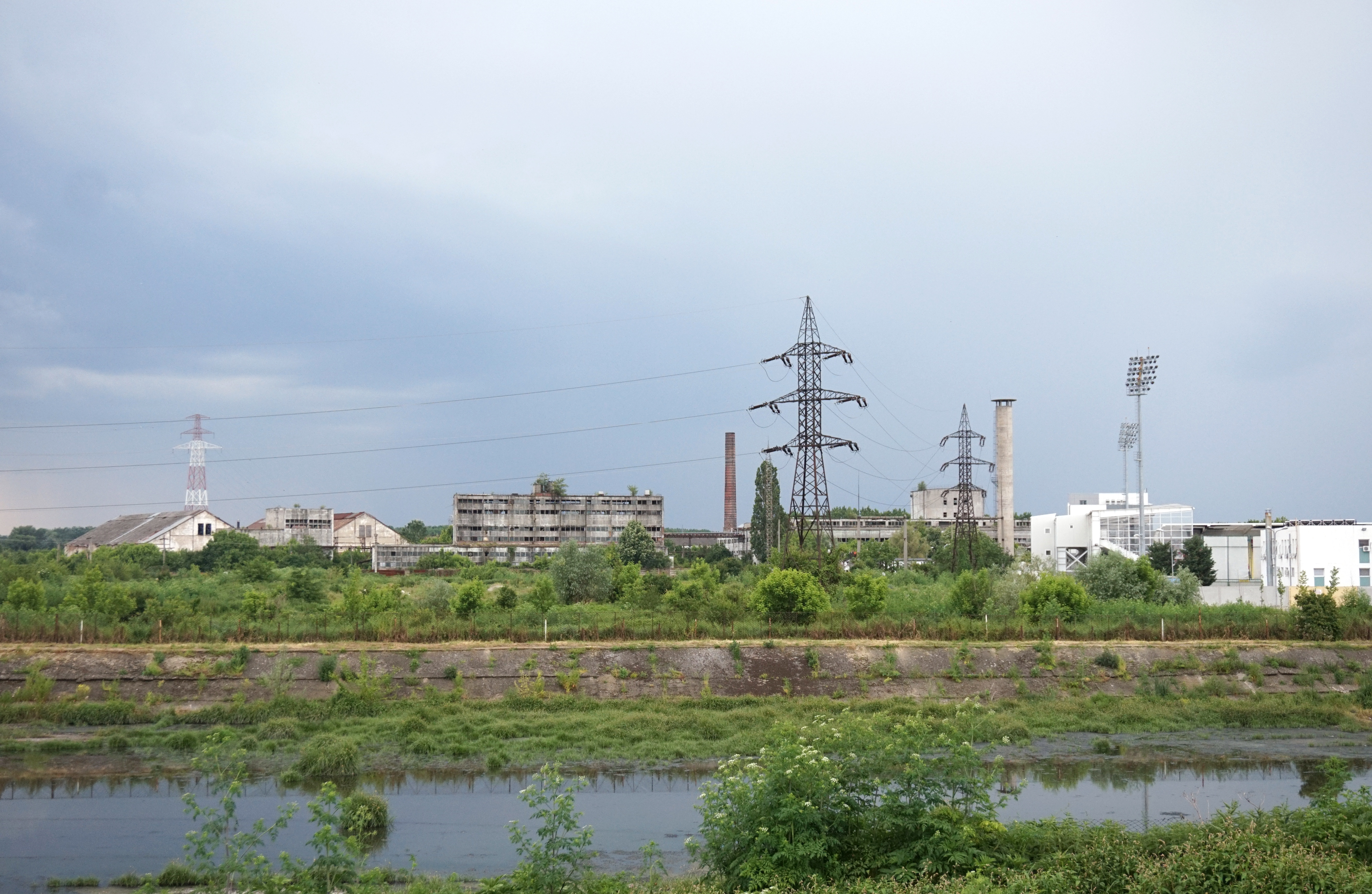
A view inside of Giurgiu of an industrial complex (abandoned)

According to an OECD economic survey from 2023, Giurgiu County ranks 42nd (last) amongst Romanian counties and the one special-status city, Bucharest, with a GDP of $2.28 billion USD, and last in PPP (Purchasing Power Parity) with $5.825 billion USD. Given the 2021 census count of 262,066 residents for Giurgiu County, this roughly translates into a GDP of ~$8,649 USD per capita, ranking 40th out of 42.

The local economy of Giurgiu is defined primarily by its geographic location along the Danube River and its position on the border between Romania and Bulgaria. The city serves as a transit and freight hub, centered on the Giurgiu–Ruse Friendship Bridge and the port infrastructure along the river. The local economy includes logistics, river transport, commercial services, light manufacturing, and food processing. Following the restructuring of state-owned industrial enterprises in the 1990s, the municipal economic base shifted toward small and medium-sized businesses, commerce, and service provision.

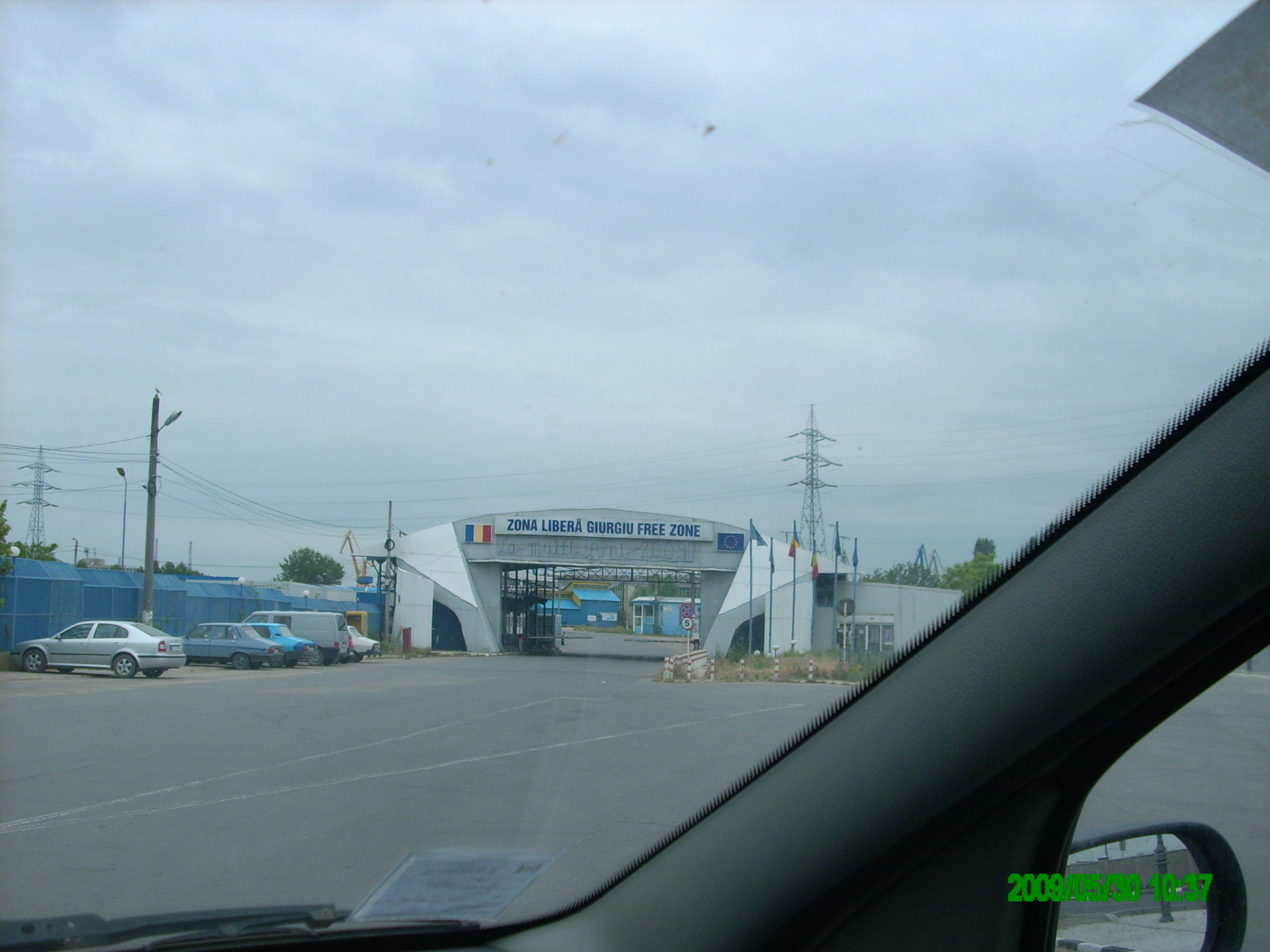
Giurgiu Free Zone

The economic activity of the city is also structured around the Giurgiu Free Zone (Administrația Zonei Libere Giurgiu). Established in 1996, the zone covers an area of approximately ~160 hectares on the Danube. The territory provides infrastructure for industrial production, commercial operations, and storage, featuring port access, customs facilities, and land concessions for foreign (mostly Bulgarian and Serbian) and domestic investors.

== Climate ==
Climate data for Giurgiu (2014-2026 normals, extremes 1981-present)
Month	Jan	Feb	Mar	Apr	May	Jun	Jul	Aug	Sep	Oct	Nov	Dec	Year
Record high °C (°F)	20.7 (69.3)	24.8 (76.6)	29.8 (85.6)	34.5 (94.1)	35.4 (95.7)	41.9 (107.4)	43.5 (110.3)	43.5 (110.3)	42.2 (108.0)	36.6 (97.9)	27.0 (80.6)	21.0 (69.8)	43.5 (110.3)
Mean daily maximum °C (°F)	5.1 (41.2)	8.7 (47.7)	13.8 (56.8)	19.5 (67.1)	24.3 (75.7)	29.6 (85.3)	32.6 (90.7)	32.8 (91.0)	27.6 (81.7)	19.8 (67.6)	11.9 (53.4)	6.7 (44.1)	19.4 (66.9)
Daily mean °C (°F)	1.0 (33.8)	3.9 (39.0)	8.0 (46.4)	12.9 (55.2)	17.8 (64.0)	22.9 (73.2)	25.3 (77.5)	25.2 (77.4)	20.4 (68.7)	13.5 (56.3)	7.8 (46.0)	3.3 (37.9)	13.5 (56.3)
Mean daily minimum °C (°F)	−3.2 (26.2)	−1.0 (30.2)	2.2 (36.0)	6.2 (43.2)	11.4 (52.5)	16.1 (61.0)	18.0 (64.4)	17.6 (63.7)	13.1 (55.6)	7.2 (45.0)	3.7 (38.7)	−0.1 (31.8)	7.6 (45.7)
Record low °C (°F)	−22.6 (−8.7)	−17.1 (1.2)	−18.5 (−1.3)	−3.7 (25.3)	1.3 (34.3)	6.3 (43.3)	10.7 (51.3)	10.2 (50.4)	2.5 (36.5)	−6.0 (21.2)	−15.0 (5.0)	−20.5 (−4.9)	−22.6 (−8.7)
Average precipitation mm (inches)	43.6 (1.72)	39.8 (1.57)	52.2 (2.06)	47.9 (1.89)	67.3 (2.65)	60.7 (2.39)	48.5 (1.91)	28.9 (1.14)	45.5 (1.79)	69.3 (2.73)	65.6 (2.58)	46.5 (1.83)	615.8 (24.26)
Average precipitation days (≥ 1.0 mm)	7.0	5.2	7.6	6.8	8.7	6.5	5.7	3.8	3.5	5.5	7.7	6.2	74.2
Average snowy days	6.0	3.9	2.3	0.4	0	0	0	0	0	0	1.2	3.3	17.1
Source: Meteomanz (2014-2026); Infoclimat (1980-2026)

== Notable natives ==
- Constantin Artachino (1870–1954), painter
- Ioan A. Bassarabescu (1870–1952), writer
- Narcis Coman (b. 1946), former Romanian football international
- Nicolae Dărăscu (1883–1959), painter
- Toma Ghițulescu (1902–1983), engineer, politician, and Olympic bobsledder
- Emil Gulian (1907–1942), poet
- Gino Iorgulescu (b. 1956), former Romanian football international
- Dumitru Iuca (1882–1940), politician
- Petre Crăciun (born 1962), best known as children's writer
- Theodor Anton Neagu (1932–2017), paleontologist
- Miron Nicolescu (1903–1975), mathematician, President of the Romanian Academy
- Eugenia Popescu-Județ (1925–2011), dancer
- Paraskev Stoyanov (1876–1940), Bulgarian physicist and surgeon
- Constantin Teașcă (1922–1996), football coach and writer
- Alexandru Vianu (1903–1936), writer and translator
- Tudor Vianu (1898–1964), literary critic, art critic, poet, philosopher, academic, and translator
- Ion Vinea (1895–1964), poet, novel, journalist, literary theorist, and political figure
- Vasil Zlatarov (1869–1932), Bulgarian aviation pioneer

== Twin towns ==
Giurgiu is twinned with:

- Ruse, Bulgaria
- Dunaújváros, Hungary

== See also ==
- FC Astra Giurgiu, the city's professional football club
