= Ștefan Octavian Iosif =

Romanian poet and translator (1875–1913)

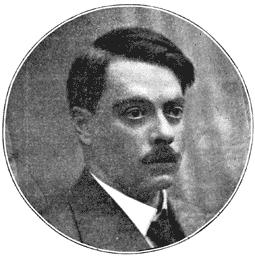
- Born: 11 October 1875; Brassó, Austria-Hungary
- Died: 22 June 1913 (aged 37); Bucharest, Kingdom of Romania
- Occupations: Poet, translator
- Spouse: Natalia Negru (m. 1904; div. 1911)
- Writing career
- Genre: Lyric poetry

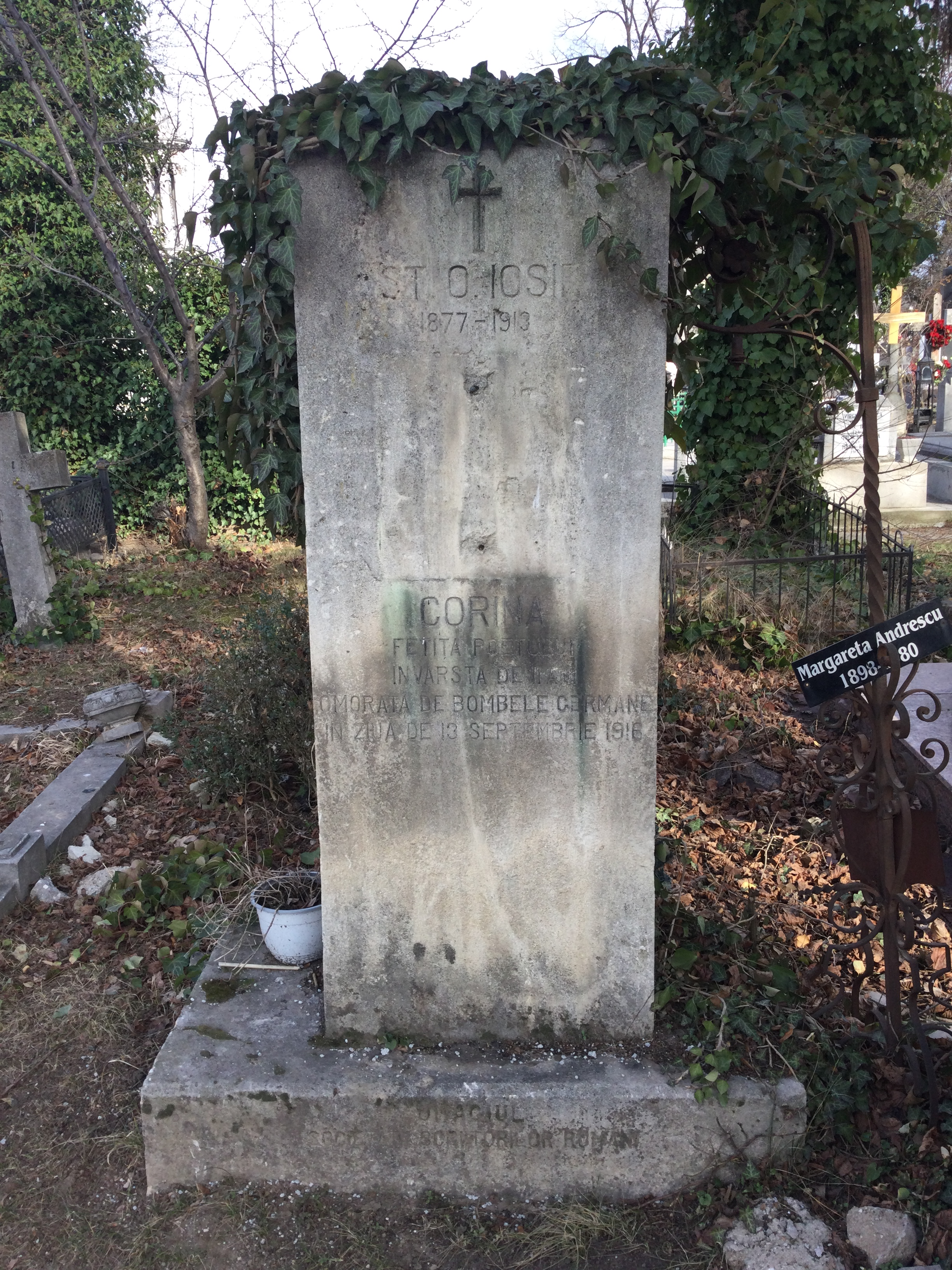
Grave at Bellu Cemetery

Ștefan Octavian Iosif (Romanian pronunciation: [ʃteˈfan oktaviˈan ˈjosif]; 11 October 1875 – 22 June 1913) was a Romanian poet and translator.

== Life ==
Born in Brașov, Transylvania (part of Austria-Hungary at the time), he studied in his native town and in Sibiu before completing his education in Paris. While in France, he met Dimitrie Anghel, who would become a long-time friend. In Bucharest, Iosif, Anghel and Emil Gârleanu created a literary society (1909), the Romanian Writers' Society; Iosif later became associated with Sămănătorul.

His friendship with Anghel came to an abrupt end after the two writers fell in love with the same woman, Natalia Negru. She was first married to Iosif, but divorced him in order to remarry Anghel. The latter was drawn to despair by her infidelities, and committed suicide in 1914. Iosif had died the year before, at a hospital in Bucharest, after having suffered a stroke. He was buried at Bellu cemetery.

== Works ==
- Patriarhale (1901)
- Romanțe din Heine (1901)
- Poezii (1902)
- "Amintire" (1902)
- Din zile mari (1905)
- Credințe (1905)
