= Eugen Bălan =

Romanian writer

Eugen Bălan (October 21, 1904 – April 4, 1968) was a Romanian prose writer.

Born in Focșani, his father was a career army officer who died in the Battle of Turtucaia. He attended the Military High School in Craiova and the Polytechnic School, working as an engineer until the end of his life. His disjointed literary activity comprised two distinct phases. The first involved his 1941 debut novel, Într-o duminecă de august, which won the Romanian Writers' Society prize and was issued in a second edition a quarter-century later. This book surprised critics with its maturity, sure phrasing and simple structure, as well as through it is the sudden nature of its publication, without prior indication of the author's talent. Bălan resumed writing after his retirement in 1965, composing sketches and short stories. He had decided late in life to write a new book, not wishing to remain as the author of a single one, and his return to literature marked a second debut. He died in Bucharest, and the writings he left were published posthumously as Exerciții in 1970.
