= Aurel Chirescu =

Romanian poet (1911 – 1996), his first book was the 1939 "Finister"

Aurel Chirescu (September 11, 1911 – 1996) was a Romanian poet.

Born in Craiova, his parents were army officer Dumitru Chirescu and his wife Eleonora (née Groșeanu). After attending a rural primary school, he went to high school in his native city and in Bucharest. He studied at the literature and philosophy faculty of the University of Bucharest, graduating magna cum laude; his professors included Nicolae Cartojan, Ovid Densusianu, Mihail Dragomirescu, Tudor Vianu and Alexandru Rosetti. From 1935, he taught at various Bucharest high schools.

While still in high school, he made his published debut in the school magazine Amicii culturii, which he edited himself; his first work in a serious publication came in 1928 in Arhivele Olteniei magazine. His first book was the 1939 Finister, which was awarded the Young Writers' Prize by the Carol I Academic Foundation. From 1933 to 1935, he edited Litere magazine, which had a certain impact at the time. Publications that ran his work include Gândirea, Revista Fundațiilor Regale, Universul literar, România Literară and Convorbiri Literare. Before the end of World War II, he published two further volumes of poetry, Stinsa oglindire (1943, Romanian Academy Prize) and Ospățul de taină (1944). He returned to writing in the 1970s, and his books of that decade include Finister 2 (1970), Metafore (1971), Pasarea de cenușă (1972) and Brâncuși (vol. I-II, 1972 and 1974).
