= Eugen Boureanul =

Romanian prose writer

Eugen Boureanul (February 18, 1885 – November 28, 1971) was a Romanian prose writer.

== Biography ==
Boureanul was born in Tecuci. His parents were Gheorghe Boureanul, a general who had an engineering diploma from Germany, and his wife Zoița (née Galery). After obtaining degrees in law, literature and philosophy from the University of Iași, he took a doctorate in philosophy from the University of Bologna. Following his return to Romania, he worked as a lawyer, reporter, teacher and civil servant in Iași and Bucharest. From 1935 to 1944, he worked at the Romanian Radio Broadcasting Company, where he reached the position of director.

Boureanul's first published work appeared in Sămănătorul in 1905; his first book, Povestiri din copilărie, came out the same year. His contributions ran in Flacăra, Neamul românesc, Floarea darurilor, Drum drept, Adevărul literar și artistic, Arhiva and Evenimentul. He published several books of sketches and stories, including Povestiri de pe dealuri (1926), Povestiri de prin văi (1928), Omul fără noroc (1931) and the novel Cel din urmă erou (1943). He took a long study trip that took him from Scandinavia to North Africa, Ceylon and western and northern India. The resulting ravel account appeared in partial form as De la Thule la Taprobana (1969). Boureanul translated works by Oscar Wilde, Gérard de Nerval, Johann Wolfgang von Goethe, Guy de Maupassant, Jack London and Leo Tolstoy. He won the Romanian Writers' Society prize in 1926.

Boureanul died in Poenari. His son was the writer, Radu Boureanu.
