= George Silviu =

Romanian poet, playwright, translator and lawyer

George Silviu (pen name of Silvius Goliger; January 2, 1901 – May 16, 1971) was a Romanian poet, playwright, translator and lawyer.

Born into a Jewish family in Focșani, his parents were Iancu Goliger, an architect, and his wife Hermina. After graduating from Unirea High School in his native town, he took a law degree from the University of Bucharest in 1922. In 1923, he graduated from the officers' school as a second lieutenant in the Romanian Land Forces. He joined the Socialist Party of Romania in 1920, and worked as an editor for the left-wing newspapers Adevărul, Dimineața (1920–1930) and Lupta (1925–1937). From 1920 to 1939, he was a regular contributor to Gândirea magazine. He also wrote for Adevărul literar, Rampa, Sburătorul, Aurora, Farul, Icoane maramureșene, Năzuința, Europa, Secolul, Răspântia, Pinguinul, Pământul nostru and Lumina. He married writer and journalist Otilia Ghibu in 1930. His second marriage, to Renée Șaraga, the founder of Romania's first puppy theatre, took place in 1938.

From 1927 to 1931, he was press attaché with the Romanian delegation to the League of Nations. He worked as a lawyer within the Ilfov County bar beginning in 1924, but was excluded due to anti-Jewish regulations in 1939. After being fired, he was sent to perform military service in the garrisons in Focșani, Rânghilești and Cernavodă but was demobilized in June 1940, again due to his Jewish origins. Enrolled in forced labor, he was made to clean snow and farm. After the 1944 Romanian coup d'état and the reversal of antisemitic laws, he returned to the practice of law, and obtained a doctorate in the field with a dissertation titled Noile legiuiri și libertatea presei. Beginning in 1945, he held important government posts, such as secretary general and committee president, but resigned in 1948, shortly after a Communist regime was established. From 1949 to 1953, he was banned from publishing under his own name. Arrested in March 1953, he was held without trial at a jail for political prisoners in Bucharest until being released, without explanation, in July 1954. During the next seven years, he continued to write, published two books, and worked as an insurance clerk. In July 1961, together with his wife and two daughters, he settled in Paris. During his remaining decade of life, Silviu continued to write poetry and work on a novel inspired by his incarceration. He is buried in Père Lachaise Cemetery.

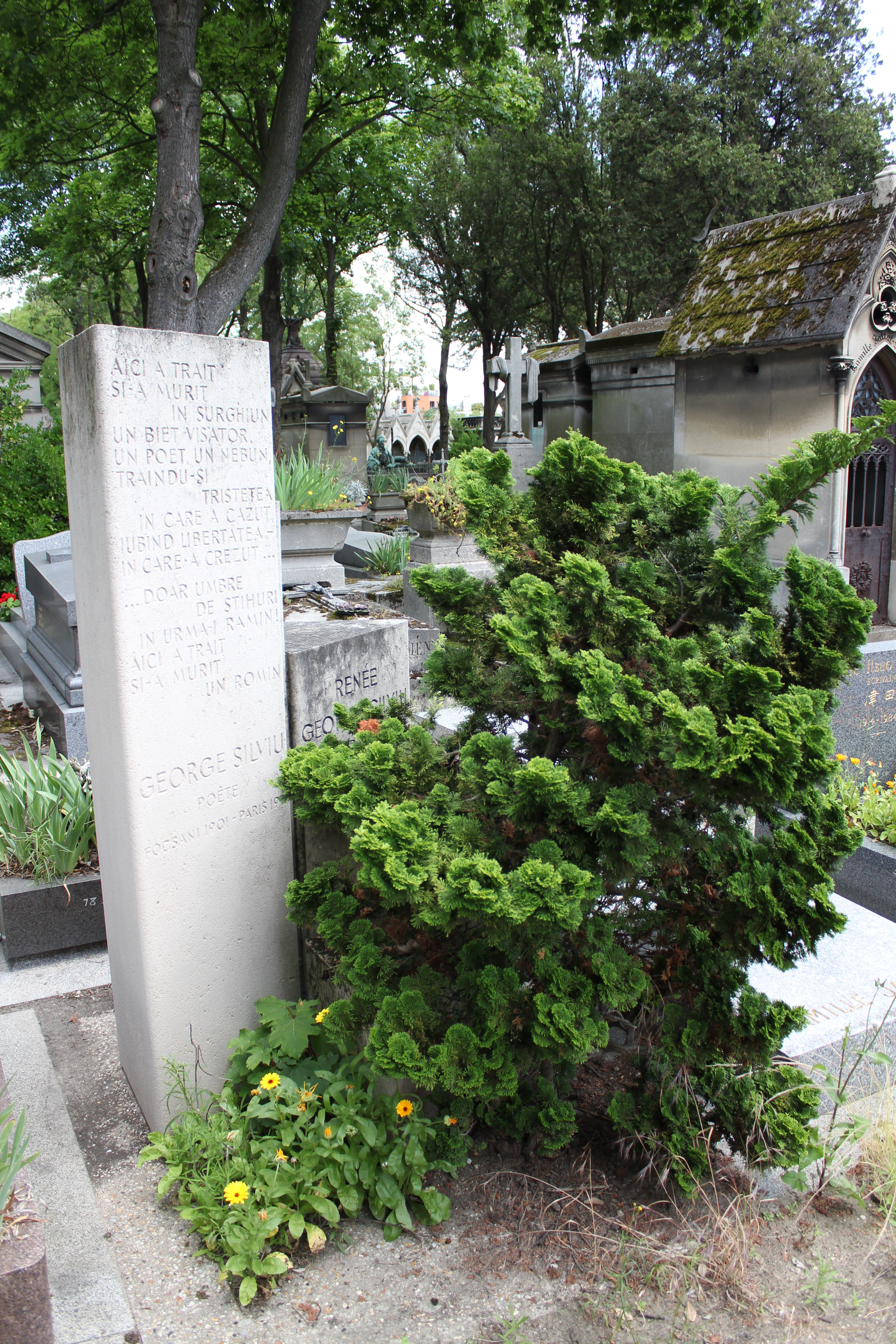
Grave in Père Lachaise Cemetery

His literary debut took place in Gândirea in 1927, with the children's verse play Motanul încălțat ("Puss in Boots"), written together with Adrian Maniu. There followed a series of children's books, sometimes signed with the pen name Moș Grigore Sfătosu: versified stories (Verde Împărat și Zmeii, 1927), poems (Jucării, 1932; Flori și fluturi, 1934) and plays (Ciufulici, 1927; Brumărel, 1945; Salba fermecată, 1958). In 1934, he published a poetry book for adults, Paisie psaltul spune…; this was followed the same year by Înfrângeri, versuri inactuale, Notații (1936) and the fables in Întâmplări cu tâlc (1956). He also translated texts by Paul Bourget, Friedrich Nietzsche and Georges Duhamel.
