= Șerban Bascovici =

Romanian poet (1891–1968)

Șerban Bascovici (born Șerban-Vasile Bascovitz; January 1, 1891–March 19, 1968) was a Romanian poet

Born in Bucharest to Gheorghe Bascovitz and his wife Ecaterina, he attended Matei Basarab High School. Upon graduating in 1911, he attempted to attend the law faculty of the University of Bucharest, but gave up, likely due to material difficulties. Instead, he was hired as a civil servant within the Labor Ministry. Working at the social insurance office, he became department head near the end of his career. He made his poetry debut in 1906 in Ovid Densusianu's Vieața Nouă, to which he contributed constantly until 1916. His work was also published in Convorbiri critice, Literatorul, Flacăra, Sburătorul, Grădina Hesperidelor, Cugetul românesc, Revista Fundațiilor Regale, Universul literar and Gândirea. Around 1909, he was attracted to Symbolism, passionately reading Paul Verlaine, Stephane Mallarmé, Henri de Régnier, Maurice Maeterlinck and Henrik Ibsen; he particularly admired Emile Verhaeren, whom he considered a "social symbolist". He considered Symbolism to be the only literary movement fit for the age. During World War I, he withdrew to Iași along with the rest of the Romanian government, and after his return to Bucharest upon the end of the war, he entered Alexandru Macedonski's circle.

His first book was the 1937 Destăinuiri, a collection of poetry which was well received by critics. He was a delicate Symbolist who wrote poems of a light and fluid melancholy that did not deal with serious problems or grave issues. Although his style resembled Panait Cerna's, it was distinguished by a meditative tendency. He published translations of Charles Baudelaire (whom he considered a precursor of Symbolism), Victor Hugo, Francis de Croisset, Molière, Maxence Van Der Meersch, Jean Giono, and Jules Renard. He won prizes from the Romanian Writers' Society in 1938 and 1941, for Destăinuiri and for a volume of Baudelaire translations. An astute critic, particularly of plays, he was knowledgeable about the theatre in Romania as well as in the rest of Europe. Prior to his death, he had prepared a volume of memoirs, Amintirile uitării.
