= Adrian Maniu =

Romanian poet, prose writer, playwright, essayist and translator

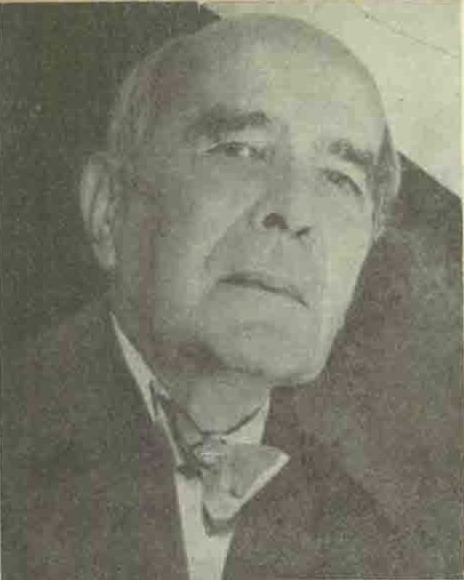
Photo of Adrian Maniu, published in 1970

Adrian Maniu (February 6, 1891 – April 20, 1968) was a Romanian poet, prose writer, playwright, essayist, and translator.

Born in Bucharest, his father Grigore, a native of Lugoj, was a jurist and professor of commercial law at the University of Bucharest; his paternal grandfather was the historian Vasile Maniu. His mother Maria (née Călinescu) was the descendant of an old Oltenian boyar family, with ancestors attested to the time of Matei Basarab; an artistically inclined woman, she cultivated a love of music, painting, and poetry within the family. All five children displayed marked intellectual and artistic leanings, while two devoted their careers to the arts: Adrian and his sister Rodica, a well-known painter during the interwar period. He had a city childhood, interrupted by brief vacations in a rustic natural setting at the Șopârlița estate on the banks of the Olteț River. Following primary school in his native city, he entered Gheorghe Lazăr High School. In the fourth year of high school, he was transferred to Matei Basarab High School, where he was classmates with Șerban Bascovici and where his teachers included Nicolae Coculescu, Ioan Nădejde, Theodor Speranția, and Constantin Banu. While still a student, he made his published debut in the high school magazine Răsăritul in 1906. Following graduation in 1910, he enrolled in the law faculty of the University of Bucharest, graduating in 1913.

Maniu's genuine debut took place while he was at university, in 1912, in Insula magazine; signing as Adrian Gr. Maniu, he contributed the prose poem "Primăvară dulce". The same year, he published his first book, Figurile de ceară, a collection of prose poems. He read extensively but not systematically, which drew him to Charles Baudelaire, Auguste Villiers de l'Isle-Adam, and Aloysius Bertrand (whom he also translated), but he quickly moved beyond his Symbolist phase toward modernism. In the summer of 1913, he served as a volunteer in the Second Balkan War; he finished as a sergeant in the reserves, but was dismissed for health reasons. He travelled to France in 1914. He contributed to Noua revistă română and to Cronica, the magazine run by Tudor Arghezi and Gala Galaction, whose humanitarian and pacifist outlook he shared. He was attracted to socialist ideas, probably through N. D. Cocea, with whom would run unsuccessfully on an "independent popular" list in the 1919 parliamentary election. He took part as a frontline volunteer in World War I between 1916 and 1918. In the closing months of the war, he re-entered literary life: his first play, Fata din dafin (co-written with Scarlat Froda), was staged; also with Froda, he co-edited Urzica magazine, which appeared in seven editions between May and July 1918; he was an editor for Dimineața and a contributor to Chemarea, Fapta, Socialismul and Hiena; his book Din paharul cu otravă appeared in 1919. In 1920, he moved to Cluj, capital of the Transylvania province that had recently united with Romania; while there, he worked as a clerk at Banca Agricolă and an editor at Voința newspaper. Together with his new friends Lucian Blaga, Cezar Petrescu, and Gib Mihăescu, he helped found Gândirea magazine, where he published Războiul poem cycle and part of the verses that would appear in the 1924 summary volume Lângă pământ. Through 1930, he was heavily involved in the theatre: he adapted Carlo Gozzi's version of "Puss in Boots"; wrote Meșterul (1922), Rodia de aur (with Păstorel Teodoreanu, 1923), Dinu Păturică (with Ion Pillat an adaptation of Nicolae Filimon's Ciocoii vechi și noi, 1924), Tinerețe fără bătrânețe (1925) and Lupii de aramă (successfully played by Maria Ventura, directed by Victor Ion Popa and with music by Sabin Drăgoi, 1929); and was a director at the National Theatre Craiova (1926–1927).

Upon his return to Bucharest, Maniu re-entered the press medium, working as an editor at Dimineața from 1931 and contributing to Rampa, Adevărul literar și artistic, Viața literară, Universul literar, Boabe de grâu, Revista Fundațiilor Regale and Muzică și poezie. He was inspector general in the Arts Ministry (1928-1946), director of the spoken program for Romanian Radio (1930–1933), and literary adviser at Fundația Regală pentru Literatură și Artă from 1932. He was elected a corresponding member of the Romanian Academy in 1933. His 1930s work included the poetry books Drumul spre stele (1930), Cartea țării (1934) and Cântece de dragoste și moarte (1935). He published Versuri, a definitive edition of his poems, in 1938, the same year he won the national prize for poetry. He also edited selections of poetic and fantastic prose: Jupânul care făcea aur (1930) and Focurile primăverii și flăcări de toamnă (1935). After 1946 and with the rise of the Romanian Communist Party, he underwent a difficult period, living off an excruciating work of translation (among which, Basme de Pușkin, 1953; Balade populare ruse, 1954; Cântecul Niebelungilor, 1958) while wracked by illness. In 1948, the new communist regime stripped him of Academy membership. In 1965, in a slightly more relaxed political environment, he was able to publish two books, Cântece tăcute and Versuri în proză, a pair of not always inspired reworkings of older texts. Shortly before his death, he revised and published his entire lyrical work as the two-volume Scrieri (1968). A lucid art critic, he was equally attracted by modern manifestations as well as by old and folk Romanian art, the structures of which informed his own lyrical vision. In 1965, the Romanian Academy awarded him its Mihail Eminescu Prize.
