= Radu Boureanu =

Romanian poet, prose writer and translator (1906 - 1997)

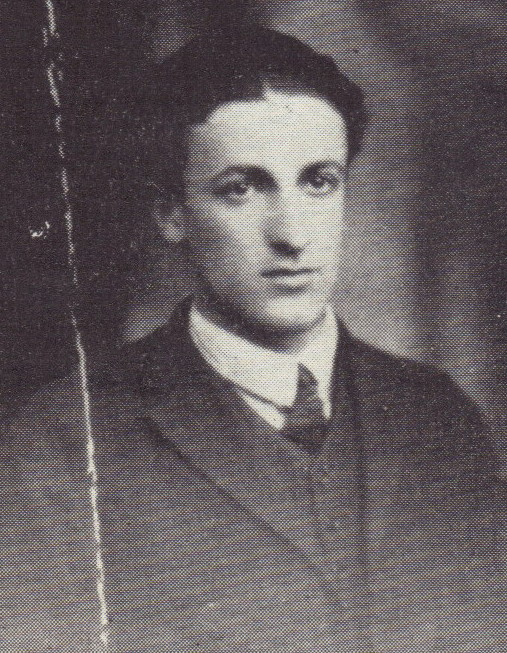
Boureanu in 1926

Radu Boureanu (March 9, 1906 – September 5, 1997) was a Romanian poet, prose writer and translator.

== Biography ==
Born in Bucharest, his parents were Eugen Boureanul and his wife Jeanne (née Michel), who was a schoolteacher of French origin. He studied at the Mihai Viteazul and Matei Basarab high schools in his native city, and privately at Bazargic. In 1931, he graduated from the Bucharest Academy of Music and Dramatic Arts, in the course taught by Lucia Sturdza-Bulandra. His first poems appeared in Ritmul vremii in 1927. Other publications that ran his work include Gândirea, Vremea, Adevărul literar și artistic and Bilete de Papagal. Together with Zaharia Stancu, he founded Azi magazine in 1932. His first book, the 1933 poetry collection Zbor alb, drew notice from critic Pompiliu Constantinescu. Between 1929 and 1931, he appeared as an actor on the stage of the National Theatre Bucharest. He resumed acting between 1945 and 1947, when he quit for good, for health reasons. From 1936 to 1940, he headed România, a tourism and art magazine. For his paintings and drawings, he received the Official Salon Prize in 1942 and 1946.

After the 1944 Romanian coup d'état and the subsequent rise to power of the Romanian Communist Party, Boureanu was chief adviser on press matters, and editor-in-chief of Viața Românească magazine (1967-1974), where he created and directed the Caiet de poezie supplement. His poetic output was immense, and earned the Romanian Writers' Society Prize (1933, 1936, 1939, 1943) as well as the Knokke-le- Zoute International Poetry Award (1970). His writings, collected as Scrieri (vol. I-IV, 1972-1979), show his evolution from a traditionalist (Zbor alb, 1933; Golful sângelui, 1936; Cai de Apocalips, 1942) to the lyricism ascribed to a civic and social vocation (Sângele popoarelor, 1948; Cântare cetății lui Bucur, 1959).

His prose includes novels (Enigmaticul Baikal, 1937; Ceașca, 1956; Frumosul Principe Cercel, 1978), exotically-themed short stories (Üstuné sau Colina goală, 1965) and a romanticized biography of Nicolae Milescu (1936). His play Lupii (1952) was awarded the State Prize, while the dramatic poem Satul fără dragoste (1955) won an award from the Romanian Writers' Union. He wrote polished translations of Alexander Blok, Emile Verhaeren, Pablo Neruda, Robert Goffin, Michelangelo, Leo Tolstoy, Nguyễn Du and József Méliusz. Throughout his career, he contributed essays and opinion pieces. His late work, Frumusețile oarbe (1982), Oceanul întrebărilor (1985), Snop de fulgere (1985) and Dulce uragan (1989), shows him at an elevated level of artistic maturity, with a poetic sensibility that, branching out into various intellectual domains, showed itself to be, in one critic's assessment, an "enormous chronicle of human sensibility".
