= Mihai Viteazul National College, Bucharest =

High school in Bucharest, Romania

Coordinates: 44.4395°N 26.1251°E

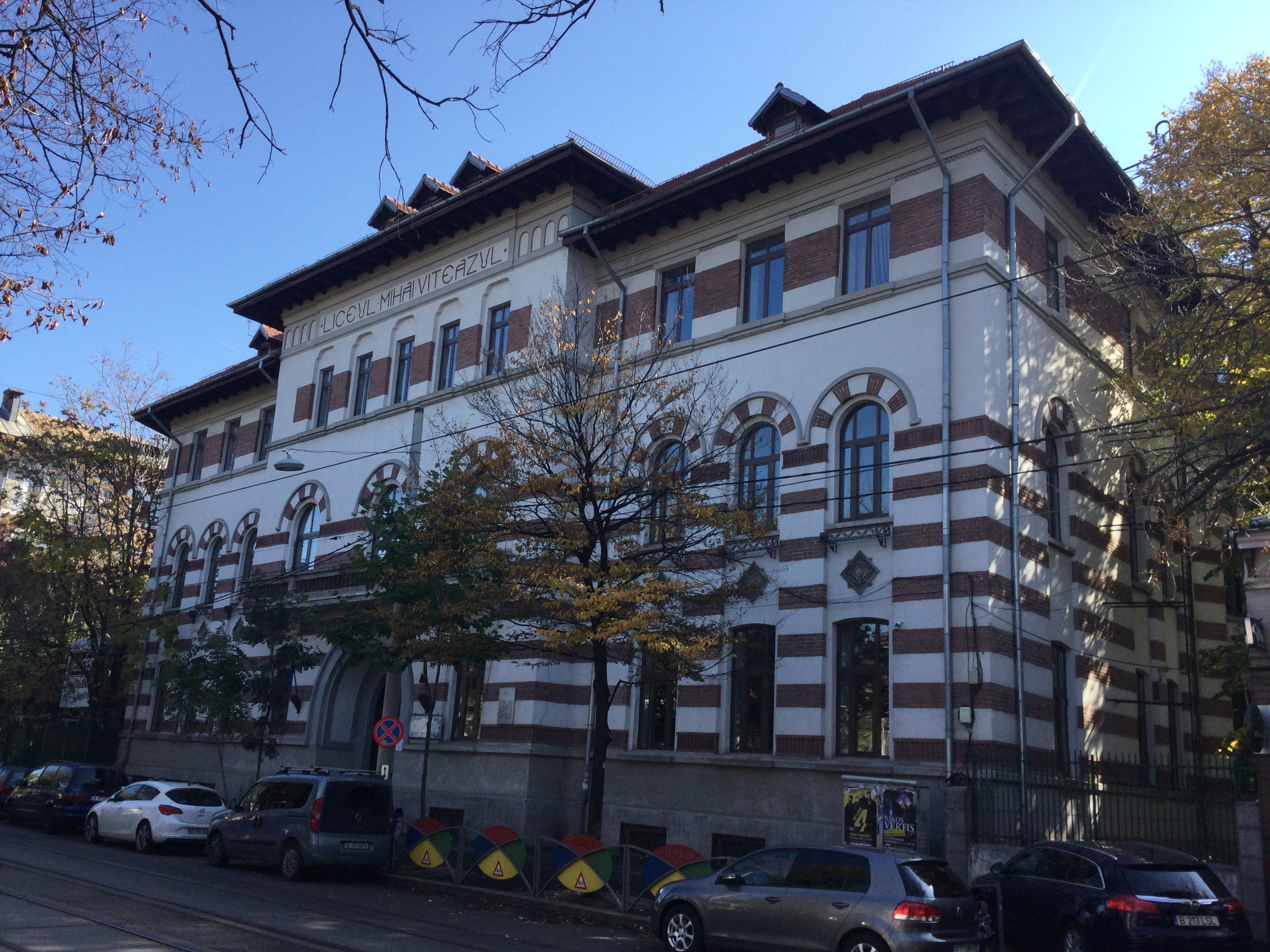
Mihai Viteazul National College

Mihai Viteazul National College (Romanian: Colegiul Național Mihai Viteazul) is a high school located at 62 Pache Protopopescu Boulevard, Bucharest, Romania. One of the most prestigious secondary education institutions in Romania, it was named after the Romanian ruler Michael the Brave (Romanian: Mihai Viteazul).

== History ==
The school traces its origins to 1865, when Saint Sava National College was becoming overcrowded and two gymnasium classes were split off, marking the start of a separate institution. In 1867, Prince Carol decreed the establishment of Michael the Great Gymnasium, marking its legal beginning. For some 30 years, the school did not have its own building, moving around from place to place. It ultimately settled in the yard of the Lutheran Church. The students showed solidarity with the 1907 Romanian Peasants' Revolt. During the Central Powers’ occupation in World War I, the school was evacuated, its archive destroyed and classes suspended. Following the war, it was decided to construct a permanent building on land acquired by the Education Ministry in 1914.

The cornerstone was laid in 1921 and work on the main building was largely completed by 1928. It was used as a field hospital in World War II. In the early years of the communist regime, the 1937 auditorium burned down during a spontaneous student protest, which led to four students (including Sorin Bottez) being condemned to harsh prison sentences. The chapel on the upper floor became and remains a gymnastics room, although the high windows retain cross shapes. Eventually, the school was again moved, while the building housed a workers’ school. It returned as School nr. 13, and was again named after Michael the Brave in 1969. It was declared a national college in 1996. In 2011, by which time there were 1,200 students, the building underwent a thorough restoration.

The school building is listed as a historic monument by Romania's Ministry of Culture and Religious Affairs.

== Alumni and faculty ==
=== Alumni ===
- Bartolomeu Anania
- Virginia Andreescu Haret
- Ion Barbu
- Virgil I. Bărbat
- Sorin Bottez
- Radu Boureanu
- Sebastian Burduja
- Ana Caraiani
- Cristofi Cerchez
- Alexandru Claudian
- A. de Herz
- Édouard de Max
- Horia Gârbea
- Alexandru George
- Mircea Gesticone
- Dimitrie Leonida
- Nicolae Paulescu
- Cristian Tudor Popescu
- Niculae Spiroiu
- Octav Șuluțiu
- Șerban Țițeica
- Dorin Tudoran
- Mircea Vulcănescu

=== Faculty ===
- Gheorghe Bogdan-Duică
- Bonifaciu Florescu
- Petre V. Haneș
- Constantin Noe
- George Potra
- I. M. Rașcu
- Octav Șuluțiu
- Ștefan Zeletin
