= Nicolae M. Condiescu =

Romanian novelist and soldier

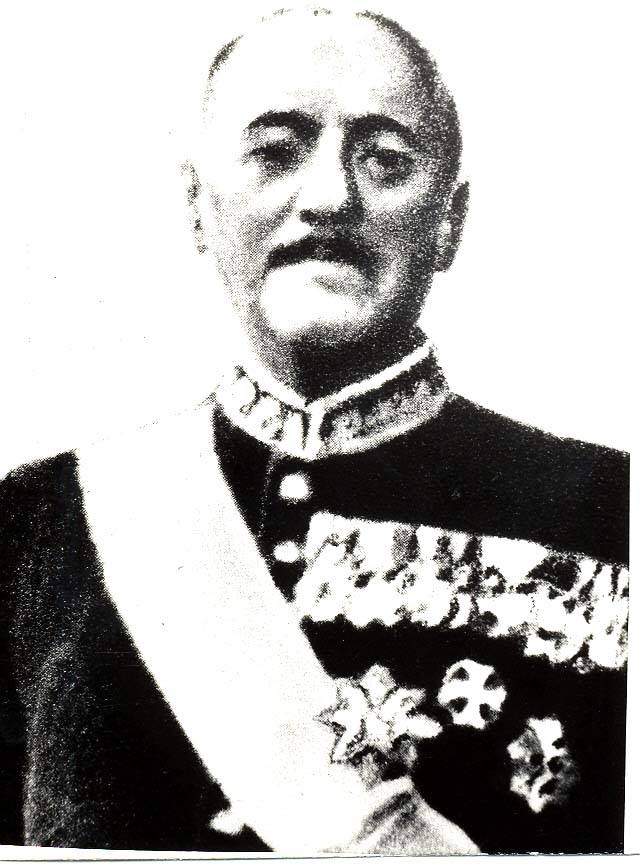
Nicolae M. Condiescu

Nicolae M. Condiescu (October 2, 1880 – June 15, 1939) was a Romanian novelist and soldier.

== Early life and education ==
Born in Craiova, his parents were Matei Condiescu, an officer in the Romanian Army, and his wife Maria (née Panu).

He attended primary school in his native city, followed by three grades at Carol I National College (1891-1894) and the school for soldiers' sons, which he finished in 1900. Moving to Bucharest, he completed the officers' school in 1902 and studied at the Higher War School from 1912 to 1914.

== Career ==
He fought in the Second Balkan War and in 1915 headed the Bucharest reserve officers' school. In 1916, he became a major, rising to lieutenant colonel in 1917; during World War I, he was part of the general staff. In 1920, he was made a colonel and aide to Prince Carol (from 1930 King Carol II), whom he accompanied on a world tour. A professor at the Higher War School, he resigned from the army in 1926, and in 1933 was made a brigadier-general in the reserves.

Condiescu made his published debut in 1895, in the Craiova-based Revista idealistă. Under the pen name Nicolae Corbu, he wrote verses and prose from 1895 to 1897 in Foaia pentru toți, Foaia populară and Revista idealistă, but then took a fifteen-year break from magazine contributions.

His first book was the 1899 poetry collection Din lacrămi. Magazines that published his work in his later phase include Gândirea, Năzuința, Cugetul românesc, Ramuri, Scrisul românesc, Viața literară and Revista Fundațiilor Regale. From 1923 to 1924, he was part of Gândirea's leadership.

He joined the Romanian Writers' Society in 1922, and was its president from 1936 to 1939. Condiescu was elected an honorary member of the Romanian Academy in 1938. He wrote a travel book, Peste mări și țări (vol. I, 1922; vol. II, 1923), after which he gained a reputation as a novelist with Conu Enake (1928) and Însemnările lui Safirim (1936).
