= Ion Scurtu =

Austro-Hungarian-born Romanian literary critic

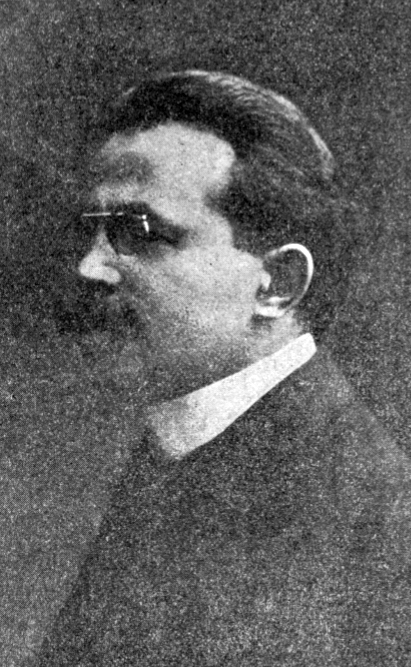
Ion Scurtu

Ion Scurtu (March 29 [O.S. March 17] 1877–July 23, 1922) was an Austro-Hungarian-born Romanian literary critic.

A native of Brașov, in the Transylvania region, he attended the local Romanian high school, where his father was a teacher. He then entered Budapest University, but withdrew in order to work as an editor for the Sibiu-based Tribuna. From there, he crossed into the Romanian Old Kingdom and edited Nicolae Fleva's Dreptatea. Returning to Transylvania, he enrolled in Franz Joseph University at Cluj, but was expelled for his nationalist activism. He was obliged to return to the Old Kingdom, and from there made his way to Leipzig University. He earned a doctorate there in 1903; his dissertation dealt with Mihai Eminescu's life, and prose work. He continued to devote himself to the study of Eminescu, writing his biography and editing collections of his writings. During the first decade of the 20th century, he was an editor at Sămănătorul.
