= Dimitrie Anghel =

Romanian poet

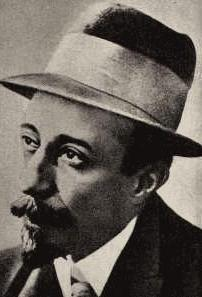
- Born: July 16, 1872; Miroslava, Iași, Romania
- Died: November 13, 1914 (aged 42); Iași, Romania
- Resting place: Eternitatea Cemetery, Iași
- Spouse: Natalia Negru (m. 1911–1914)
- Writing career
- Period: 1890–1913
- Subject: Poetry

Dimitrie Anghel (Romanian pronunciation: [diˈmitri.e ˈaŋɡel]; July 16, 1872 – November 13, 1914) was a Romanian poet.

Anghel was of Aromanian descent from his father. His first poem was published in Contemporanul (1890). His debut editorial Traduceri din Paul Verlaine was published in 1903 and in 1905 he published a volume of his works in În grădină, and in 1909, in Fantazii.

Notable poems, many of which were in collaboration with Ștefan Octavian Iosif, include Legenda funigeilor (dramatic poem, 1907), Cometa (comedy, 1908), Caleidoscopul lui A. Mirea (1908), Carmen saeculare (historical poem, 1909), published in 1910, Cireșul lui Lucullus (proză).

Around 1911 later in life he developed an interest in prose and published Povestea celor necăjiți (1911), Fantome (1911), Oglinda fermecată (1912), Triumful vieții (1912) and Steluța (1913).

He fell in love with Iosif's wife Natalia Negru, who left her husband and divorced him. Anghel and Negru married in November 1911. In the autumn of 1914, during a quarrel, Anghel fired a warning shot at Negru, lightly wounding her. Believing he had killed her, he shot himself in the chest. The resulting wound became infected, and he died of sepsis two weeks later. Anghel was buried at Eternitatea Cemetery where at the funeral, an unknown female reportedly shouted, "You miserable woman, who kills all the country's great people!" to his widow Negru.
