= Ion Vinea =

Romanian writer and political figure (1895–1964)

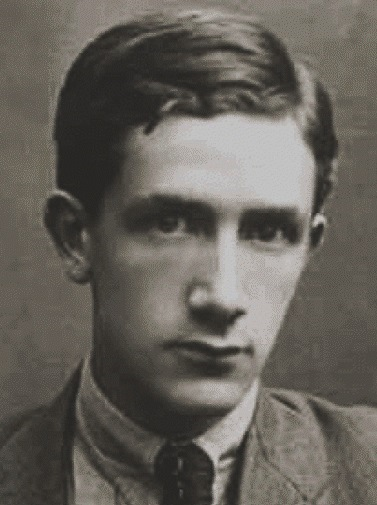
- Vinea, photographed c. 1915
- Born: Ioan Eugen Iovanaki (Iovanache); April 17, 1895; Giurgiu, Kingdom of Romania
- Died: July 6, 1964 (aged 69); Dorobanți, Bucharest, People's Republic of Romania
- Occupations: Poet, novelist, literary theorist, art critic, columnist, politician
- Writing career
- Pen name: Aladin, Ivan Aniew, Dr. Caligari, Crișan, Evin, B. Iova, I. Iova, Ion Iovin, Ion Japcă, Kalvincar, Ion Eugen Vinea
- Period: 1912–1964
- Genres: Lyric poetry, prose poem, parody, satire, collaborative fiction, sketch story, memoir, autofiction, psychological novel, Bildungsroman, closet drama, erotica
- Movements: Symbolism, Contimporanul, Constructivism, Futurism, Expressionism, Surrealism, Decadence, Fantasy realism, Socialist realism

Ion Vinea (born Ioan Eugen Iovanaki, sometimes Iovanache; April 17, 1895 – July 6, 1964) was a Romanian poet, novelist, journalist, literary theorist, and political figure. He became active on the modernist scene during his teens—his poetic work being always indebted to the Symbolist movement—and founded, with Tristan Tzara and Marcel Janco, the review Simbolul. The more conservative Vinea drifted apart from them as they rose to international fame with the Dada artistic experiment, being instead affiliated with left-wing counterculture in World War I Romania. With N. D. Cocea, Vinea edited the socialist Chemarea, but returned to the international avant-garde in 1923–1924, an affiliate of Constructivism, Futurism, and, marginally, Surrealism.

Vinea achieved his reputation as the co-founder and editor or Contimporanul, Romania's major avant-garde publication throughout the 1920s, where he also published his fragmentary prose. He expounded his social critique and his program of cultural renewal, fusing a modernist reinterpretation of tradition with a cosmopolitan tolerance and a constant interest in European avant-garde phenomena. He drifted away from artistic experimentation and literature in general by 1930, when he began working on conventional newspapers, a vocal (but inconsistent) anti-fascist publicist, and a subject of scorn for the more radical writers at unu. After a stint in the Assembly of Deputies, where he represented the National Peasants' Party, Vinea focused mainly on managing Cocea's Facla. By 1940, he was an adamant anti-communist and anti-Soviet, ambiguously serving the Ion Antonescu dictatorship as editor of Evenimentul Zilei.

Spending his final two decades in near-constant harassment by communist authorities, Vinea was mostly prevented from publishing his work. Driven into poverty and obscurity, he acted as a ghostwriter for, then denouncer of, his novelist friend, Petru Dumitriu. He held a variety of employments, making his comeback as a translator of Edgar Allan Poe and William Shakespeare. He died of cancer just as his own work was again in print. Vinea had by then been married four times, and had had numerous affairs; his third wife, actress-novelist Henriette Yvonne Stahl, was still redacting his unpublished novels. These fictionalize episodes of his own life in the manner of decadent literature, establishing Vinea's posthumous recognition as an original raconteur.

== Biography ==
=== Simbolul years ===
Born in Giurgiu, the future Ion Vinea was the son of Alexandru Iovanaki and Olimpia (née Vlahopol-Constantinidi). Although, in adulthood, Vinea categorically denied his Greek ethnicity, his parents was of documented Hellenic origins. While a paternal grandfather was officially listed as "of Romanian nationality and origin", his wife was French—and her surname of "Chauvignac" is the origin of the pen name "Vinea". The poet also belonged to the upper strata, through both his paternal and maternal lineages. Ion's father was a nephew of Prince Cariagdi, once described by Romanian poet-journalist Mihai Eminescu as one of the country's most odious "Phanariotes". Virtually adopted by Cariagdi after his parents committed suicide, Alexandru took an engineer's diploma from the École Centrale. He did not practice: known to the authorities as either a "winemaker" or "unemployed", he always lived off on a country estate in Drăgănești.

Olimpia, a classics teacher, was a Graeco–Ottoman immigrant, whose parents still resided in Istanbul during the 1890s. Accounts differ as to her more distant ethnic origins, with some claiming that she was an Aromanian, and others a Romaniote Jew. She was nine years younger than her husband, who, in his thirties, became seriously ill. According to one account, Ioan was Iovanaki's son in name only, conceived by Olimpia, a woman of outstanding beauty, with Henry C. Dundas, the British consul in Galați. Throughout his life, the writer was colloquially known as Englezul ("The Englishman").

When Vinea was still an infant, the Iovanakis moved from Giurgiu to Bucharest, capital of the Romanian Kingdom, where, in 1905, they had another son, Nicolae. Ioan always had a conflicted relationship with Alexandru, and, according to his friend Nicolae Carandino, "was raised by his mother". In his childhood, he trained himself to read in both Romanian and French, also speaking good Latin and German; he much later taught himself English. While attending primary school at Sfânta Vineri Institute from 1902, he was neighbors and friends with musician Lily Haskil, who gave him piano lessons. In some accounts, he is depicted as a childhood friend of her more famous younger sister, Clara Haskil, though he only met the latter around 1937. Vinea himself discovered a talent for the piano, and later took private lessons alongside Haskil and Jacques G. Costin, both of whom remained his friends for life. Music remained a secondary pursuit throughout his life, but he was generally shy about performing in public—his most noted performance came later in life, when, while visiting violinist George Enescu, he was persuaded into accompanying Enescu on the piano.

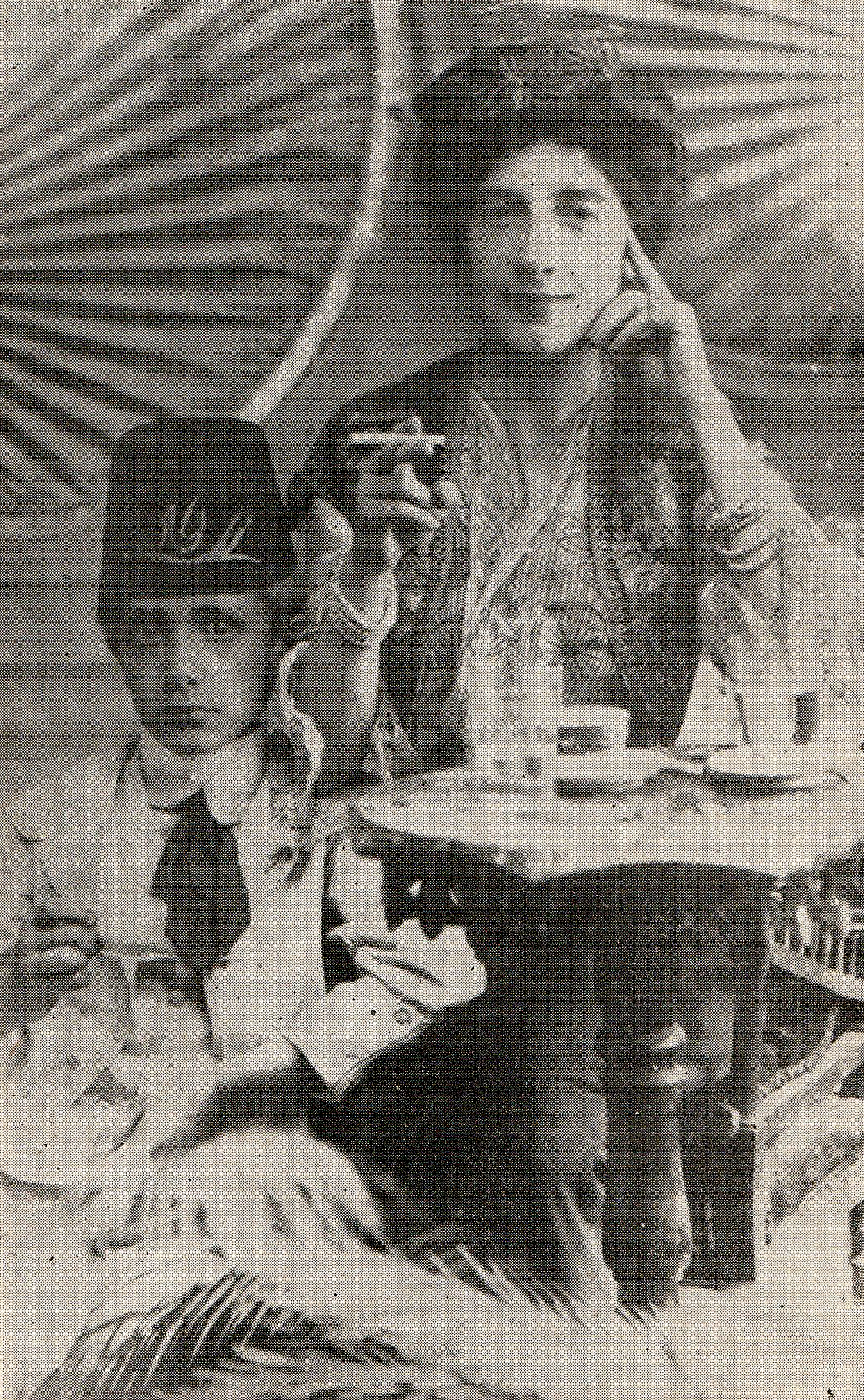
Olimpia and Ioan Iovanaki in Istanbul, c. 1902

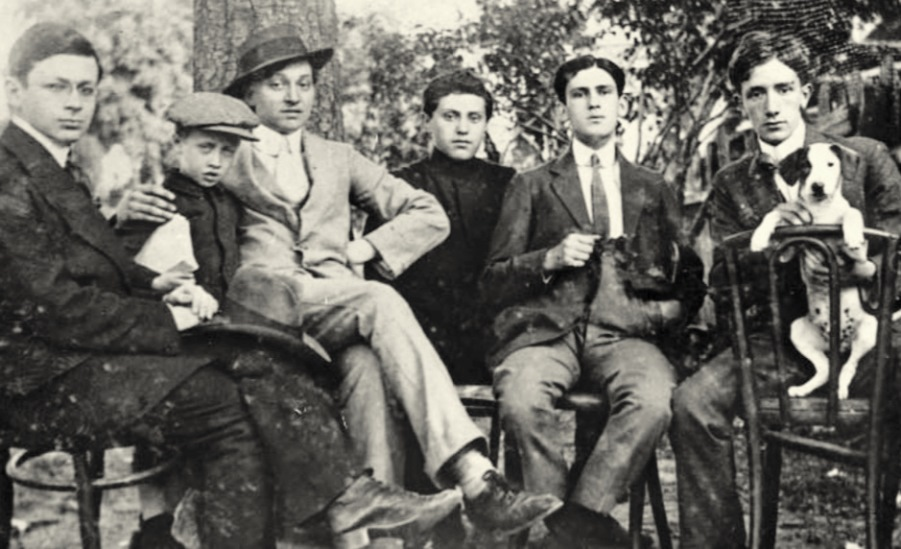
Vinea (holding up a puppy), and other figures of the Simbolul circle (in 1912 or 1915): Tristan Tzara, Marcel Janco, Jules Janco, Poldi Chapier; Vinea's brother Nicolae is probably also pictured, second from the left (between Tzara and M. Janco)

From 1910, when he enlisted at Saint Sava National College, Vinea applied himself to philology, covering modern French literature—then Symbolism, which became his main focus. He had the older Symbolist Adrian Maniu for a school tutor, but generally did poorly, averaging 8.33 in literature and philosophy (less than the 9.75 he got in choral music). In October 1912, together with Saint Sava colleagues Marcel Janco and Tristan Tzara, Vinea set up the literary magazine Simbolul. Although juvenile and short-lived, it managed to attract contribution from some of Romania's most visible Symbolists: Alexandru Macedonski, N. Davidescu, Emil Isac, Ion Minulescu, Claudia Millian, Al. T. Stamatiad, and Maniu.

Simbolul was also a public signal of Vinea's anti-establishment fronde, openly taunting writers associated with traditionalism or ruralizing Poporanism. Nevertheless, his own poems, published therein, were generally tame, heavily indebted to the likes of Macedonski, Minulescu, and Albert Samain. Shortly after the Simbolul episode, Vinea vacationed in Gârceni, on Tzara's estate, and at Tuzla. The Tzara–Vinea collaboration produced a new species of self-referential modernist poetry, which transcended the Symbolist conventions. Both youths were also fascinated with the same "neurasthenic girl", who appears in their works as Sașa (Sacha), Sonia, or Mania, their relationship with her was apparently broken up when she was hospitalized for her mental condition.

=== Post-Symbolist "new faith" ===
From mid 1913, Iovanaki was a columnist and left-leaning lampoonist at N. D. Cocea's Facla and Rampa, working under a variety of pen names: "Ion Iovin", "Evin", "Ion Japcă", "Ion Eugen Vinea", "Crișan", "I. Iova", and, possibly, also "Stavri" or "Puck". Constantin Beldie took him on board at Noua Revistă Română. Finally adopting the Ion Vinea signature in 1914, he quickly matured into a "feared and merciless" polemicist with "infallible logic", writing "texts of elegant vehemence, bearing the clear imprint of his intellect." As noted by literary historian Paul Cernat, he took care not to define himself not as a professional and "classifying" critic, but rather as an independent thinker in the manner of Remy de Gourmont and Charles Baudelaire; however, his efforts were aimed at compensating for the lack of Symbolist critics and exegetes. Looking for references outside Symbolism, then finding them in Walt Whitman, Guillaume Apollinaire, and Henri Bergson, he prophesied that a "new faith" and an anti-sentimental literature were in the making.

As a culture critic and artistic doctrinaire, he found affinities with the Western European Futurists, Cubists, and especially Simultanists, whose non-static art, he believed, was a more accurate representation of the human experience. Like the Futurists, young Vinea cheered for industrialization and Westernization, giving enthusiastic coverage to the Young Turk Revolution. He was thus also an advocate of social realism, praising Maxim Gorky and, in later years, Dem. Theodorescu, Vasile Demetrius, Ion Călugăru, and Panait Istrati. Vinea's hobbyhorse was defending cosmopolitanism against traditionalist nationalism: he publicized the formative contribution of Greeks, Jews, and Slavs to old and new Romanian literature, and ridiculed the conservative antisemitism of critics such as Ilarie Chendi, Mihail Dragomirescu, and Nicolae Iorga.

Other noted targets were moderate "academic" Symbolists, including Anna de Noailles, Dimitrie Anghel, and especially Ovid Densusianu; and modernists of uncertain convictions, among them Eugen Lovinescu—to whom Vinea reserved some of his more bitter sarcasm. In a 1916 piece, he imagined Lovinescu as "a youth, already a bourgeois, already bloated and probably soft". Vinea was himself greatly charismatic, variously described by his peers as "enviable", "beautiful and serene", but also "spoiled". According to fellow modernist Felix Aderca, Vinea sacrificed himself to "originality" and "style", mocking his inferiors and only picking up on "the finest poetic waves". He made a point of showing that he despised literary cafés, the gathering spots of "poets with no muse". He did however attend Terasa Oteteleșanu and other such bars, mixing in with the literary crowd. Consumed by his involvement in public life, he graduated from Saint Sava in 1914 with the mediocre average of 6.80.

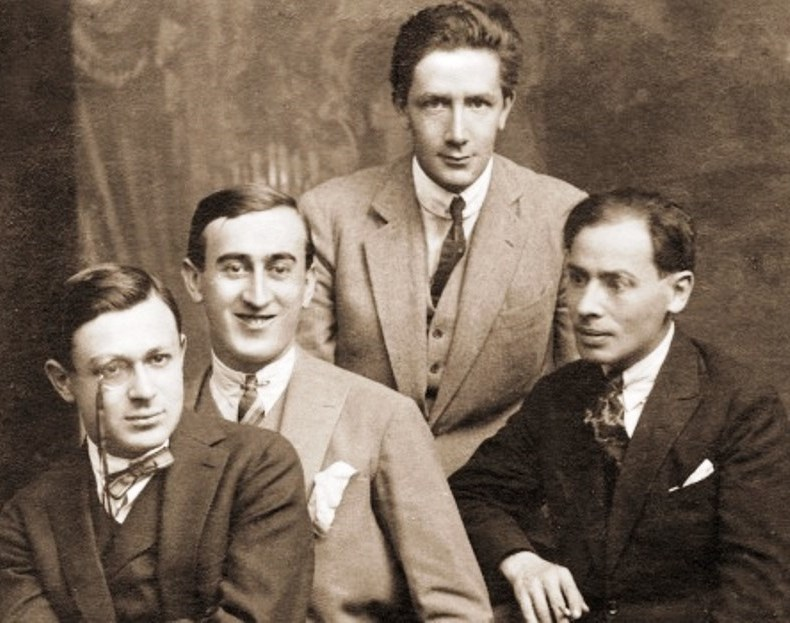
Vinea (standing) with Tzara, M. H. Maxy, and Jacques G. Costin, during the first Chemarea period (1915)

This period saw the start of World War I, with Romania settling into a tense neutrality that lasted until August 1916. Vinea involved himself even more in political and social debates: writing for Tudor Arghezi and Gala Galaction's Cronica, he defended a schoolgirl accused of fornication, and helped propel the issue to national prominence. He kept a lasting grudge against Arghezi, who frequently censored his "revolutionary" outbursts; for his part, Arghezi noted in 1967 that he always "loved and admired" Vinea. Also at Cronica, he published praise for poets Maniu and George Bacovia, who best agreed with his ideal post- and para-Symbolist aesthetics. Vinea was also featured in Alexandru Bogdan-Pitești's dailies, Libertatea and Seara, where he also inducted Costin. He preserved a keen interest in wartime politics, but did not explicitly share the "Germanophile" agenda that supported the Central Powers, although it was prevalent at Cronica, Seara, and Libertatea. Like Arghezi, Bogdan-Pitești and Cocea, he maintained a lasting hatred for the establishment National Liberal Party (PNL), which translated into sympathies for either conservatism or socialism. At the time, he decried Romanian politics as one of intrigues and "latrines", caricaturing Ion I. C. Brătianu and Take Ionescu as egotistical tyrants.

=== Chemarea and World War I ===
From October 4 to October 11, 1915, together with Demetrius, N. Porsenna, and Poldi Chapier, Vinea directed his own review, Chemarea, best remembered for hosting Tzara's radical poetry. It also issued Vinea's Avertisment ("Warning") a "clearly iconoclastic" art manifesto. As the unsigned columnist, Vinea briefly discussed the "stupid war" and mocked those who supported the Entente powers as "jackals", calling out their support for the annexation of Transylvania and Bukovina as hypocritical and imperialistic; he praised pacifist socialists for their "civic courage". He reserved scatological outbursts for the Ententist Vasile Drumaru and his "National Dignity" paramilitaries, also decrying the "populist imbecility" of nationalist authors such as Popescu-Popnedea or Constantin Banu.

Once Romania declared war on the Central Powers, Vinea was drafted into the Romanian Land Forces, training with the third heavy artillery regiment. He kept close company with two young women, Maria Ana Oardă and Aurica Iosif (sister of the late Transylvanian poet Ștefan Octavian Iosif); the three all contributed to a diary, which mainly records Iosif's own enthusiasm for "Greater Romania" throughout the early Romanian offensive. Serving continuously, but behind the lines, from August 1916 to 1919, Vinea followed the army on its hasty retreat to Western Moldavia, settling for a while in Iași, the provisional capital. In October 1916, "I. Iovanache Vinea" was enlisted by the artillery school in Iași, serving in the same battery as Porsenna, Alfred Hefter-Hidalgo, Ion Marin Sadoveanu, Ion Sân-Giorgiu, poet Alexandru Rally, and philosopher Virgil Zaborowski. Together, they sent "warm regards" to Dragomirescu, who had been their teacher. In his spare time, Vinea resumed work in the press, initially at Cocea's newspaper Omul Liber, but also in Octavian Goga's nationalist propaganda paper, România. His absence from the front was later used against him by the nationalist press, which referred to him as a "wartime truant".

From June 1917, he and Cocea, alongside various Simbolul writers, reissued Chemarea as a radical-left and republican newspaper. Its rhetorical violence made it an object of scrutiny for military censors, and Chemarea avoided closure only by regularly changing its name. He and Cocea alternated as editors-in-chief: under Vinea's management, the paper was more artistic than political, but (according to his own claims) Vinea also conspired with Cocea and others on a "revolutionary republican committee". On November 23, 1917, Vinea married his girlfriend Oardă—who, as "Tana Qvil" (or "Quil"), was also publishing verse in Chemarea, and whose estate helped fund the magazine. Looking back on the period in a 1966 letter, she noted that Vinea, "alone, utterly lost and disoriented, ill-fitted for life in the barracks, was sinking into neurosis".

While Vinea struggled at Chemarea, Tzara and Janco found international success with the Cabaret Voltarie in Switzerland, birthing the anti-art movement known as "Dada". Vinea was kept informed about the developments by Tzara himself, and sent in congratulatory letters which, according to researchers, give clues that he was envious; he also sent Tzara a poem of his, but this proved too tame for Dada standards, and was never taken up. Vinea boasted that he was working on a Dada-like collection of stories, Papagalul sfânt ("Holy Parrot"). This promise also failed to materialize. In early 1918, following disagreements with Cocea, Vinea left Chemarea and joined the staff of Arena, a daily put out by Hefter-Hidalgo. In early March he was contemplating a lifelong stay in Iași, "alone with my wife", remarking that he no longer missed Bucharest.

In April, as Romania contemplated surrender to the Central Powers, Vinea wrote his most pessimistic editorial of the era, suggesting (wrongly) that the Entente was losing on all fronts. He soon regretted his Arena affiliation, confirming Hefter's bad reputation as a blackmailer, and returned to Chemarea. An undated letter to Qvil, which researcher Sanda Cordoș proposes is from around that time, suggests that Vinea returned on his own to pacified Romania, and was summering with his father in Drăgănești. Tzara's international magazine, also called Dada, announced in May 1919 that "Jon Vinea" had just published a volume called Păpușa din sicriu ("Doll in Casket")—which was in fact non-existent.

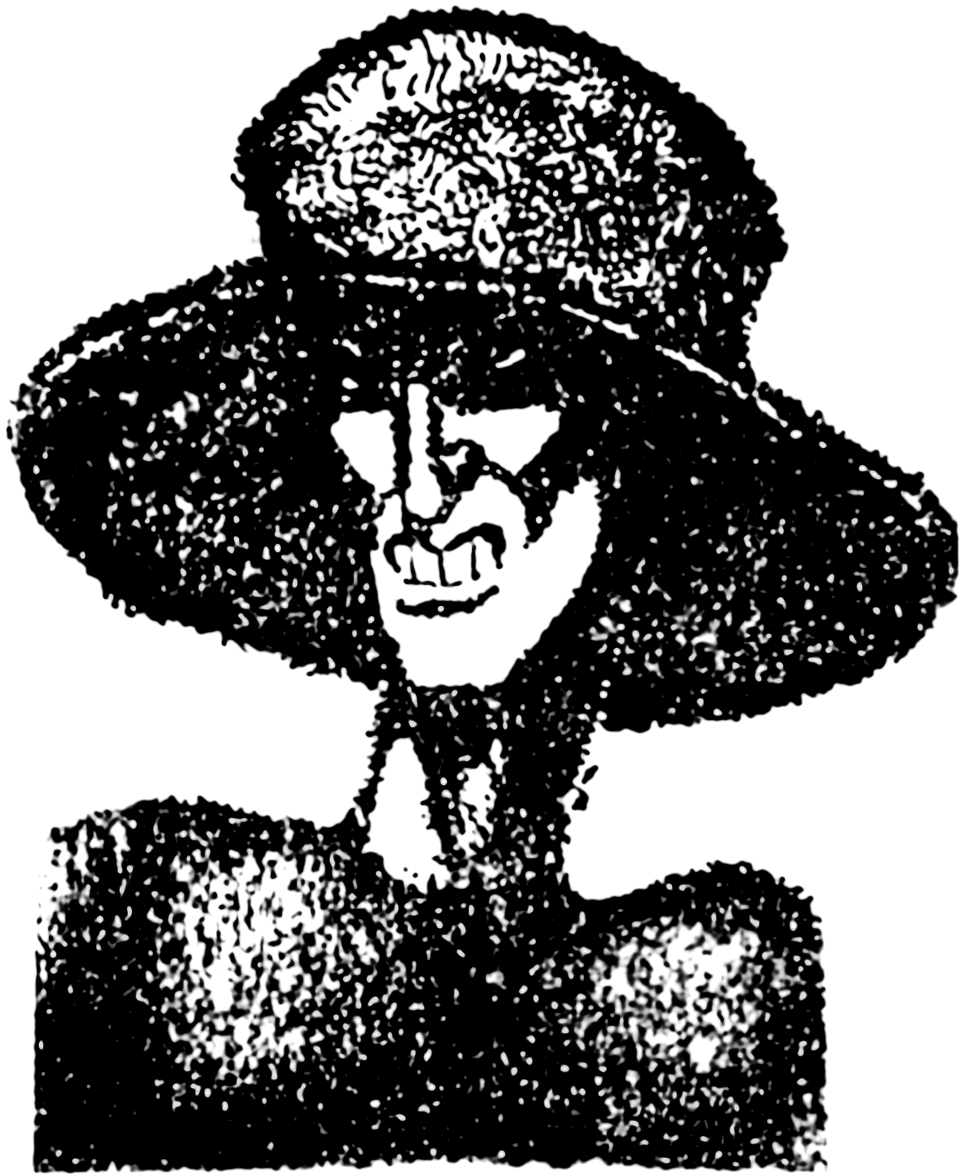
Dida Solomon-Callimachi in Simoom, 1924 caricature by Victor Ion Popa

Later that year, shocked by his brother's death in a freak riding accident (which he would always refer to as "the onset of loneliness"), Vinea took a sabbatical. He was pursuing an adulterous relationship with the aspiring actress Dida Solomon, who was working as a typist. In September 1921, he confided to Tzara that he had tried ending that affair by journeying alone to Mangalia, and then to Valea Călugărească, but that he greatly missed her. They were back together in 1922, with Vinea directly involved in ensuring her new-found theatrical success. Especially for her, he translated August Strindberg's Simoom and Anton Chekhov's Seagull (upon its production, she was billed as "Dida Solomon-Vinea"); he also wrote her a one-act play, which was only published decades after both had died. The Vinea–Qvil couple was by then separated, but without any legal formalities; in 1922, they were officially divorced.

=== Setting up Contimporanul ===
Vinea studied off and on at the University of Iași Law School alongside Costin, only graduating in 1924. He never submitted his written thesis, and never became a practicing attorney. Again making Bucharest his main residence, he edited for a while at Facla: with Cocea jailed for lèse-majesté, the newspaper was overseen his father, Colonel Dumitru Cocea. Vinea mediated between this autocratic manager and the liberal staff. Before 1922 Vinea became a regular contributor to central dailies such as Adevărul and Cuget Românesc. His literary chronicles attest his positive reevaluation of selected, "fanfare-less", traditionalists, from Mihail Sadoveanu to Victor Eftimiu, from Lucian Blaga to Ion Pillat. Blaga reciprocated in 1926, when he stated his love for Vinea as a "poet of pleasant surprises", and as the only avant-garde figure worth celebrating.

Vinea was also an occasional contributor to Gândirea, the Transylvanian modernist-traditionalist review. Later, he was even featured in Viața Românească, a magazine established by the Poporanists, which was itself becoming a soft promoter of modern literature. He was still a vocal opponent of the academic traditionalists, satirizing Dragomirescu and the Romanian Writers' Society for their purge of Germanophile talents such as Arghezi. With an acid editorial in Chemarea, he tackled the creation of a Romanian Upper Dacia University in Transylvania, describing it as the result of a contrived and overconfident nationalist push.

At Luptătorul newspaper, he resumed earlier discussions about the "parasitical" nature of literary criticism. These claims were soon completed by sarcastic notes on the inflation of novels and novelists in Western countries, and their relative scarcity in Romania. Vinea argued that Romanian literature could develop without the novel: "its absence isn't necessarily a reason to feel melancholy." He envisaged a literature of the lampoon, the prose poem, the reportage, and the greguería. His columns on Dada moved from half-hearted support, visibly annoyed by Tzara's "buffoonery", to chronicling of the movement's "ephemeral" nature and inevitable demise. Ignored by Tzara, Vinea began reciprocating: he claimed that Dada was not Tzara's making, but had deeper Romanian roots in the avant-garde stories of a (still obscure) suicidal clerk, Urmuz, and in the work of sculptor Constantin Brâncuși. He depicted the primitivist streak of high modernism as a more authentic current than traditionalism, in particular Transylvanian traditionalism, and saw Muntenia as the cradle of authentic urban culture. This led to publicized polemics with Alexandru Hodoș, the nationalist columnist at Țara Noastră, but also with Benjamin Fondane, the more cautious Moldavian modernist.

In June 1922, accompanied and sponsored by the returning Janco, he set up Contimporanul, a review of art and, "rather implicitly", left-wing politics: its "not quite dogmatic" socialist militancy targeted the PNL's continuous dominance. The money came from Costin, who was also its most constant intellectual affiliate. From the onset, the magazine was not just cosmopolitan, but also antifascist and anti-antisemitic, lampooning the "hooliganism" of the National-Christian Defense League (LANC) and the far-right tinges of the People's Party. Returning to Iași in 1922, Vinea and his employee I. M. Sadoveanu were seriously injured in a scuffle with LANC students.

Contimporanul's original contributors included Nicolae L. Lupu of the left-leaning Peasants' Party. Vinea railed at "reactionary" forces that crushed European revolutions, spoke out against Italian fascism, gave ambiguous support to communism in Soviet Russia, and decried the persecution of Romanian Communist Party activists by PNL governments. Petre Pandrea, who organized the legal defense for some of the imprisoned communists, alleges that, as early as 1923, Vinea took Soviet money sent to him by a leading party member, Ana Pauker. In that context, Vinea produced an editorial eulogy to Karl Marx, and, as he later noted, supported "all the rallies and campaigns organized by the labor movement", being a combatant for Dem. I. Dobrescu's League for Human Rights.

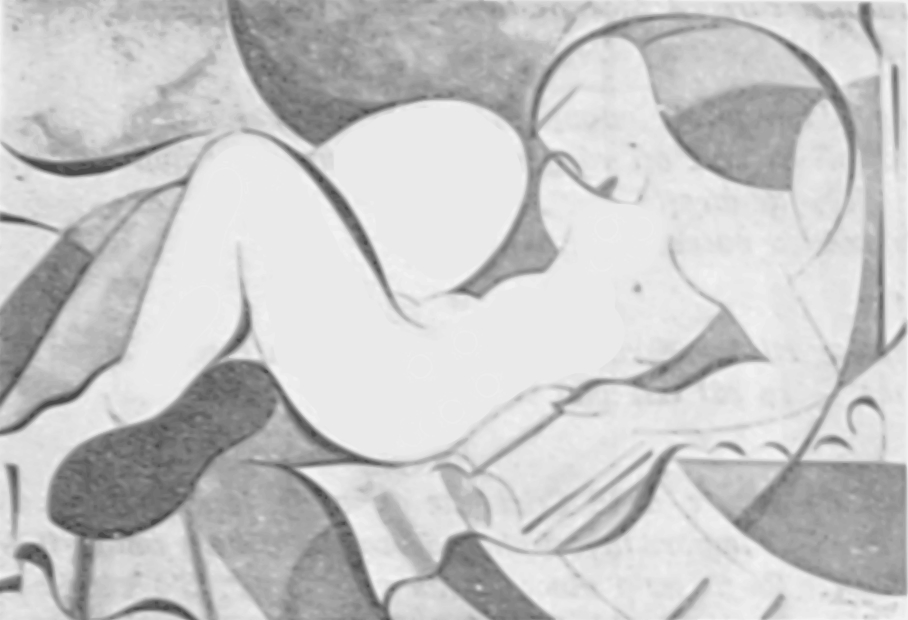
Nude by Sidney Hunt, published on the Contimporanul cover (October 1925) alongside Răsturnica

The longest-running avant-garde publication, Contimporanul openly affiliated with "Constructivism" after 1923. This move showcased not merely modernism, but also Janco and Vinea's disillusionment with Dada. Vinea explained that true modernism included a search for authenticity and a "creative path" forward, not the deconstruction of tradition. Still eclectic, the journal acquired international ambitions, reprinting pieces by Tzara (which had been backdated by Vinea) and letters from Ricciotto Canudo, together with advertorials and reviews for 391, Der Sturm, De Stijl, Blok, Ma, and Nyugat. This activity peaked in May 1924, a watershed moment for Romanian modernist history: Contimporanul issued its "activist" manifesto, with principles ranging from primitivist anti-art and Futurism to constructive patriotism and the taking up of modern city-planning. It demanded that Romanians topple art, "for it has prostituted itself", and also "dispatch [their] dead". Vinea, Janco, M. H. Maxy, and Georges Linze were curators of the Contimporanul art show, which opened in November 1924, bringing the group to national attention, and sampling the major tendencies of European Constructivism. That year, Contimporanul was joined by Ion Barbu, who soon became its poet laureate, alongside the more senior Arghezi and Vinea himself. Vinea shared with Barbu a favourite pastime, the consumption of recreational drugs, most probably cocaine and sulfuric ether, but was less keen on frequenting literary hotspots such as Casa Capșa. For decades, they would compete not just as poets, but also as womanizers, keeping score of their sexual conquests. Răsturnica ("Miss Tumble-over"), Barbu's ribald ode to a dead prostitute, was published by, and is sometimes attributed to, Vinea.

With Contimporanul launched, Vinea declared himself a member of Romanian and Balkan artistic-revolutionary elite, which was to educate the passive public and bring into the modernist fold—as argued by Cernat, this showed Vinea's "peripheral complex", his feeling of being stuck in an "accursed" cultural backwater. He delved in art criticism, with short essays on exhibits by Janco and Maxy, and with eulogies for folk and abstract art. He continued to deride, or simply ignore, Lovinescu, whose Sburătorul competed for the role of modernist guardian. As Cernat notes, his scorn had a personal and political, not artistic, motivation. Contimporanul managed to neutralize and absorb smaller Futurist magazines such as Scarlat Callimachi's Punct. However, it was chronically plagued by financial setbacks, and almost shut down several times; during such episodes, Vinea took up work for Cocea at Facla.

=== Deradicalization ===
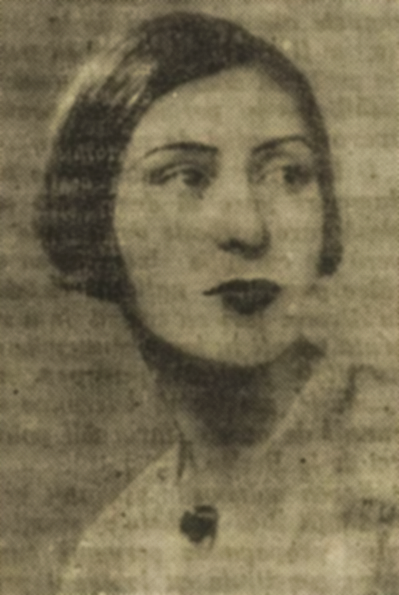
Nelly Cutava in 1933 (as depicted in Vinea's Facla)

At Contimporanul and, for a while, at Eugen Filotti's Cuvântul Liber, Vinea diversified his literary contributions. He gave a mixed review to the Surrealist Manifesto, praising the surrealists' focus on "organic" revolt against "the hegemony of the conscious mind", but noting that its debt to psychoanalysis was defeating the purpose. Shortly before his death, he recalled having participated in a Parisian surrealist session, alongside Tzara, Louis Aragon, André Breton, Robert Desnos, and Paul Éluard. The groups was venting its frustration at being barred from publishing in L'Humanité; Vinea looked back on their demands as "aberrant", since they would have compromised "a great working-man's newspaper." In 1925, he put out the sketch story volume Descântecul și Flori de lampă ("Incantation and Lamp Flower"), followed in 1927 by the embryonic piece of his novel Lunatecii ("The Lunatics"), printed in Contimporanul as Victoria sălbatică ("Savage Victory"). His father died that year, leaving him to look after Olimpia Iovanaki; an adoring son, he remained by her side and closely followed her advice. He had separated from Solomon, who went on to marry Callimachi in August 1924. On the night just before the wedding, she wrote Vinea to inform him that she still felt love for him, and proposing that they elope to commit a double suicide; over the following months, she published in Punct poems alluding to Vinea and her own "mangled heart". For some ten years, Vinea was unhappily married to actress Nelly Cutava, divorcing her c. 1930. She was the sister of a more successful actress, Tantzi Cutava-Barozzi.

A journalist colleague, Romulus Dianu, argues that Vinea's interwar activities were implicitly "revolutionary", and that he was one of the "anti-bourgeois forces working for bourgeois newspapers". Within this setting, he was a builder, or "garden", who allowed others to embark on more adventurous enterprises. In his articles and interviews, Vinea himself complained that independent journalism was a dying art, but also an exhausting occupation. His socialist radicalism slowly discarded and his literary activity curtailed voluntarily, Vinea courted, and eventually joined, the centrist National Peasants' Party (PNȚ) and began a two-year stint at Nae Ionescu's Cuvântul, a right-wing (later fascist) daily. It was there that he met the newspaper impresario Pamfil Șeicaru, who would offer him employment later in life. In tandem, Vinea seemingly grew tired of Futurism, publishing in 1925 a French anti-manifesto for la révolution de la sensibilité, la vraie ("that true revolution, of sensibility"). In November, he entertained Henri Barbusse, the French pacifist novelist and known affiliate of the Communist International, who had come in Romania to campaign for the Tatarbunary rebels. In describing Barbusse for his Facla readers, Vinea compared him to the glowing figure of Jesus Christ in Leonardo's Last Supper. By 1926, he was visiting Bădăcin, a Transylvanian fief of PNȚ leader Iuliu Maniu, and trying to attract the politically ambitious novelist Camil Petrescu into a secretive collaboration with the same Maniu. Carandino claims that Vinea subsequently acted as an adviser to some main PNȚ figures, namely Armand Călinescu and Virgil Madgearu, as well as diplomat Nicolae Titulescu.

In conversation with Aderca, Vinea demanded that Contimporanul be remembered not for "political fighting", but for "its influence on our artistic life". The magazine was taking a more conciliatory view of Italian fascism, while also praising the council communists at Die Aktion and pushing for a détente with the Soviet Union (although remaining critical of Soviet totalitarianism). Vinea still issued the occasional anti-bourgeois satire, notably in I. Peltz's Caiete Lunare, which resulted in a conflict between Peltz and the Censorship Directorate. Running in the December 1928 and June 1931 elections, Vinea represented the constituency of Roman in the Assembly of Deputies to 1932. A story rendered by Pandrea places Vinea at the center of intrigues between the PNȚ factions: allegedly, Vinea and Sergiu Dan conspired to deceive Mihail Manoilescu, the corporatist theoretician, into buying a forged anti-monarchy document that they attributed to Madgearu. Manoilescu paid them some 150,000 lei before the forgery could be exposed.

In 1930, Vinea published his volume Paradisul suspinelor ("A Haven for the Sighs") with Editura Cultura Națională, illustrated by Janco. He was already credited as a translator of books by Romain Rolland (1924) and Jules Barbey d'Aurevilly (1927), but these were in fact penned by Tana Qvil; she had asked he former husband to lend her his more prestigious signature. He had also made a publicized return to the mainstream press, with opinion pieces and lampoons in Adevărul, Cuvântul, and the PNȚ organ Dreptatea, and with literary prose in Mișcarea Literară. He was for a while a member of Dreptatea's editorial team. His links with the avant-garde were waning: he still published Romanian or French-language poetry in Contimporanul, and prose in more radical magazines such as Punct, 75HP, and unu, but his modernist credentials were coming under critical scrutiny. At Contimporanul, he organized a lavish reception to the former Futurist Filippo Tommaso Marinetti, who was also an official celebrity of Italian fascism.

There followed a split between Contimporanul and unu: at age 35, Vinea came to be denounced as the prototype "Old Man" whom the avant-garde wanted silenced. The controversy was political rather than artistic: unu, dominated by communist hardliners Sașa Pană and Stephan Roll, was perplexed by the ambiguity surrounding Marinetti's politics, and also by the acceptance at Contimporanul of "reactionaries" such as Mihail Sebastian and Sandu Tudor. Around 1930, Vinea and Roll still had regular meetings with each other, but largely because Roll was tutoring his elder colleague in amateur boxing; the two men engaged each other in sparring matches. At that stage of his life, Vinea reconciled with Lovinescu, with whom he now shared a moderate outlook and liberal agenda. His friendship with Barbu cooled after 1927, when the latter left Contimporanul for Sburătorul. Vinea never allowed him to return.

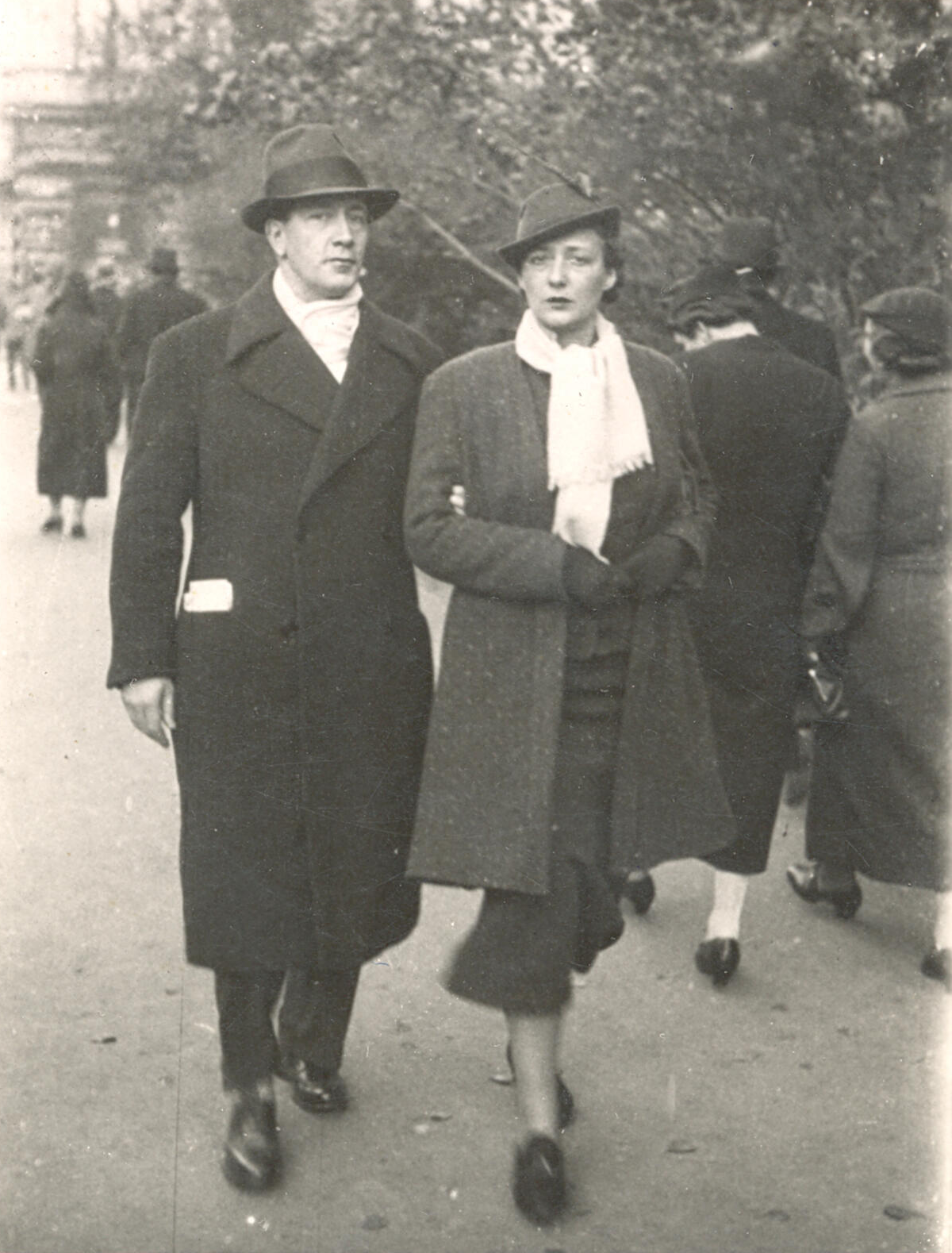
Vinea and wife Henriette Yvonne Stahl, c. 1940

Vinea continued to write prose, and, in 1931, with the celebratory 100th issue of Contimporanul, announced that he was putting out Escroc sentimental ("Philanderer"), an early draft of Lunatecii. According to Cordoș: "Decades before it was an actual book, Vinea's novel was a legend in the Romanian literary milieu." Critic George Călinescu noted at the time that "Ion Vinea [...] enjoys the nimbus of poets who do not publish, surrounded by that mysterious air"; Carandino attests that he himself took pains in convincing Vinea to reach a wide audience with his poems: "[I was] going as far as to presenting them without the author's knowledge or consent. That didn't work. He found out at the last moment and had them withdrawn, with a spat of verbal violence." Peltz also writes that "rarely have I met a writer who appeared so indifferent about his own work", noting that Vinea had planned to publish more systematically only after turning 60.

While postponing his contributions, Vinea led a bohemian lifestyle, which, together with his lasting passion for chess, made him a friend and confidant of a fellow aristocrat, Gheorghe Jurgea-Negrilești. From 1930 or 1931 to 1944, Vinea was married to Henriette Yvonne Stahl, an actress and award-winning novelist, as well as a famed beauty. They lived a largely secluded life in Brașov, owing to Henriette's health problems. Unbeknown to the world, the couple were recreational morphine users and avid oneiromants. Stahl tried to get Vinea to join her in studying theological and paranormal investigations by Emanuel Swedenborg, but found his "obtuseness" unsettling.

=== Facla years ===
Contimporanul went bankrupt in 1932, by which time Vinea had by then replaced the retiring Cocea as editor of Facla, and was writing for the minor political newspaper Progresul Social. He was either using his own name or resorting to familiar pen names: "B. Iova", "Dr. Caligari", "Aladin". Together with Carandino and Leon Kalustian, he ran Facla's column Panerul cu raci ("The Crabs' Basket"), also sharing the pseudonym, "Kalvincar". The editorial politics here changed to reflect the PNȚ line. Vinea renounced his republicanism and paid homage to the returnee King Carol II. Carandino writes that, as a rule, Vinea "took very little care of Facla": "We got used to seeing our director as an 'outside' contributor, as he was so rarely present in the gazette pages". Vinea "wrote very rarely, and did so in that type that was most uncharacteristic—prompted by the day's news. But what he wrote was that which absolutely needed to be written: exact and perfect." For a while in 1929 and 1930, he was in France on an extended trip, and later bragged about making friends with F. Scott Fitzgerald. According to Dianu, he spent all the money from his book sales on entertaining a young lady. During his leave of absence, he assigned Olimpia Iovanaki as manager of Facla and its dwindling finances; Dianu wrote several columns that he signed using Vinea's name (and which Vinea never even read), while Lucian Boz was assigned as the literary reviewer.

Despite having promoted Marinetti and "tend[ing] to align himself with right-wing intellectuals", Vinea expressed his leftist antifascism to such degrees that the editorial office was repeatedly vandalized by either the LANC or its younger rival, the Iron Guard. He also drifted away from PNȚ politics, deploring the party's failure to address the Great Depression, while also giving his endorsement to the Grivița Strike of 1933. A vocal adversary of Nazi Germany, Vinea described Hitler as a "half-learned hunchback", and in July 1934, shortly after the Night of the Long Knives, optimistically announced that "Hitlerite national pederasty" was "in agony" (Nazional [sic] pederastria hitleristă în agonie). He also deemed the Soviet Union a "natural ally of all those who support peace without [territorial] revisions." Facla opened its pages to Communist Party militants Alexandru Sahia (whose main contribution, however, was not given the censors' approval, and was only preserved by Vinea in his personal archive) and Gheorghe Petrescu-Ghempet; it also hosted fragments from Aragon, Lunacharsky, Pozner, and polemics regarding A. L. Zissu's defense of Trotskyism. Vinea still argued that communism and "Romanianism" were irreconcilable, but suggested that Romania had nothing to fear from the Soviet Union—the Iron Guard, Vinea contended, was much more dangerous. Ideologically, he was closest to the moderate-left Social Democrats, and, unlike the unu group, was never placed under surveillance by Siguranța policemen.

In March 1934, after the Iron Guard's Nicadori assassinated Premier Ion G. Duca, Vinea opined in Facla that fascism's quest for a dictatorship was senseless: Romanian democracy, being "corrupt and catastrophic", was "in reality a dictatorship". (As noted by historian Zigu Ornea, Vinea "consciously exaggerated" the point, so as to attack both fascism and his old National Liberal enemies.) According to fellow journalist Paul Teodorescu, Vinea "the democrat, with pronounced sympathies toward the workers' movement," exposed himself to the far-right's retribution once he questioned "totalitarian obscurantism". On October 5, 1934 (or in 1936, according to Vinea and Carandino), Facla was nearly destroyed by the LANC, an attack which left Vinea physically injured. In another incident, recounted by Dianu, a "crazed man" visited the offices brandishing a revolver, and threatened to kill Vinea for publishing articles which "keep making references to me". He averted this crisis by congratulating his assailant for his "deductive intelligence", winning his confidence and camaradery, and then sending him on his way. Another tense moment came in 1936, when Stahl was disfigured in a road accident. Vinea became unfaithful, pursuing "complicated" affairs with other women, but also frequenting the Bucharest brothels.

Critical recognition of Vinea's work first peaked in 1937, when Șerban Cioculescu penned a monograph on him and the "centrist position" of his poetry, calling him "a classic of the literary movement." A minor scandal occurred in modernist circles when Carandino allowed Eugène Ionesco to publish a Facla piece calling Vinea "the greatest Romanian poet", next to whom "Tudor Arghezi is not worth a damn." Vinea himself issued a disclaimer, carried in his own newspaper. Spurred on by Alexandru Rosetti, he was working on a definitive edition of his verse, to be published by Editura Fundațiilor Regale as Ora fântânilor ("The Hour of Fountains"). He soon tired of the project, and the manuscript lingered in the archives for three more decades. Also in 1937, the far-right National Christian Party came to power, fully censoring Facla's content. Around that time, Vinea established clandestine links with the Zionist underground, informing them about German funds laundered through Romanil Company, which went to finance Romania's far-right; his contact was Jean Cohen, who reported to Tivadar Fischer.

The quasi-fascist National Renaissance Front (FRN), presided over by King Carol II, took over in 1938, with all other parties outlawed and freedom of speech curtailed. Facla survived this clampdown, but the regime reduced its circulation, forcing it to become a weekly. Starting that year, Vinea served several terms as president of the Union of Professional Newspapermen (UZP), continuously to 1944. As Teodorescu reports, he used this position to question censorship, and also assigned funds to "journalists who had been imprisoned or were unemployed." At some point in 1939, he completed, but never published, a satirical piece mocking the Iron Guard for its practice of blacklisting men of other political persuasions, including himself. Following the death of his political enemy, Nae Ionescu, Vinea penned his obituary in Facla. Ionescu disciple Mircea Vulcănescu found it to be a "vibrant and understanding" tribute.

In June 1940, the FRN became a more totalitarian "Party of the Nation", tightening its grip on the lesser corporate bodies. On the occasion, Vinea endorsed the king's personality cult, writing that the entire UZP would submit to "the Nation's Supreme Flag-bearer [with] a tenacious faith in a grand national destiny". The start of World War II had isolated Romania from the Allies, but also brought shocking revelations about a Nazi–Soviet Pact. As reported by unu's Miron Radu Paraschivescu, Vinea reacted by cutting off his communist contacts and regretfully expressing his preference for the Nazis: "I would rather be a lackey of some prestigious house than the servant of yokels like Molotov and Stalin." Troubled by the inaccuracies of his earlier predictions, Vinea was reading and reviewing as "great" Trotsky's anti-Stalinist texts. Later that year, the Nazi–Soviet dissolution of Greater Romania enraged Vinea and pushed him into open anti-Sovietism. That series of events also resulted in Carol's downfall and the inauguration of Iron Guard rule: a "National Legionary State", aligned with the Axis powers and having Ion Antonescu as Conducător. Guardist ascendancy signaled the end of Facla, forcibly shut down in September 1940.

=== Antonescian career ===
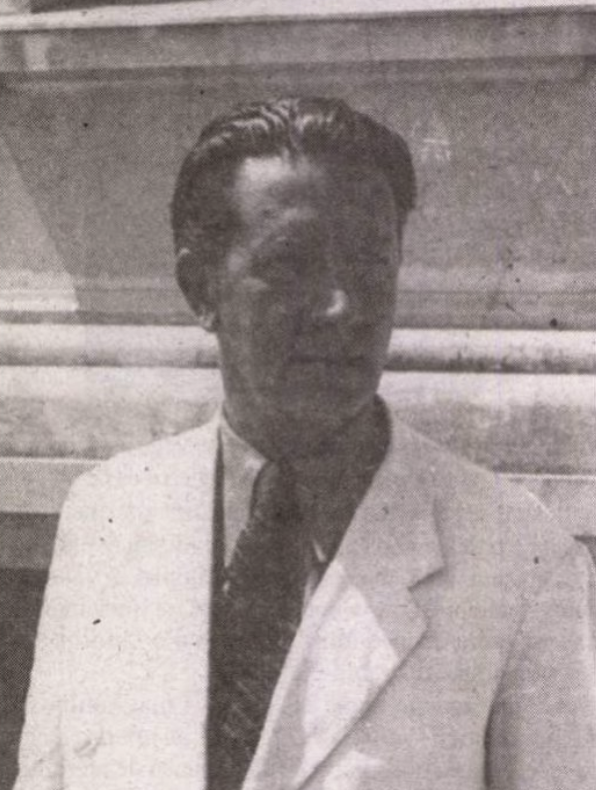
Vinea in the 1940s

In January 1941, Antonescu and the Iron Guard fell out with each other, which led to a brief civil war—Vinea witnessed from the side (and with some amusement) as fascist Barbu was convened to patrol a Guard precinct; in Bucharest, a pogrom erupted, during which Vinea hid and protected Sergiu Dan. Costin's brother Michael was captured and lynched by the Guard; both Costin and Janco fled to Palestine later that year. In June, Romania became a participant in Germany's attack on the Soviet Union. Vinea was again drafted, this time, on Șeicaru's suggestion, as a military reporter in the Naval Forces; he wound up mostly stationed on the Black Sea coast. He was then assigned editor of Evenimentul Zilei, a propaganda daily published by Șeicaru, while also working at Șeicaru's Curentul. He was followed there by one of his Facla subordinates and a close friend, Vlaicu Bârna. According to the latter, Evenimentul Zilei existed as a "somewhat democratic version" of the pro-fascist Curentul. Upon Lovinescu's request, Vinea also hired a young writer, Marin Preda. Preda's accounts of life in that environment include claims that Vinea once eloped "with some whore" to occupied France, leaving his first editor to ghostwrite his columns. Vinea still authored a posthumous encomium to his former rival Nicolae Iorga, who had been assassinated by the Guard. He also partook in debates splitting the literary community: in 1941, he responded to George Călinescu's overview of Romanian literature (in which Vinea himself was only briefly covered, to his frustration), dismissing it as an impressionistic, and therefore highly subjective, contribution.

Vinea's activity in 1941–1944 became a subject for scholarly scrutiny and political disputes. In the 1970s, biographer Elena Zaharia-Filipaș argued that Vinea largely remained "his own man", who refused to publish "eulogies to tyranny and murder as one finds in the aggressive editorials of other official newspapers published during the epoch." Vinea himself claimed that he "sabotaged" war propaganda and censorship; Teodorescu similarly states that Vinea's texts featured transparent rejections of "German imperialism". However, according to literary historian Cornel Ungureanu, he had transformed himself "into an ace of official politics". This was also the position taken in that time by Paraschivescu, allowed by the Antonescu regime to publish his "Open letter to Vinea" in Tinerețea magazine. Here, Vinea was described as an overzealous and servile government asset, his "hawkish and vigilante-like" demeanor clashing badly with a "fragile and forever juvenile" appearance. Vinea's columns display a rejection of Stalinism and suggests that Nazism, a more palatable successor of revolutionary socialism, would eventually liberalize in the wake of Soviet defeat. According to Monica Lovinescu, daughter of Vinea's competitor, such pieces are praiseworthy, "lucid [and] courageous".

During the battle for Moscow, Vinea received attention for his retrospective editorial on Lenin, "the Mongol revolutionist" and his "desperate, moronic" followers, including "the Great Priest" Stalin. Some of his texts celebrate the "New European" order emerging from Germany's continental domination. However, Vinea also found himself in trouble with the Nazi Ministry of Propaganda for eulogizing Swiss neutrality and journalistic objectivity. In June 1942, he wrote an editorial describing the "universal alliance" that, he believed, was naturally emerging in favor of world peace. Though Antonescu tolerated the newspaper, his Siguranța grew alarmed by reports that Evenimentul Zilei's editorial secretary, Stăncescu, was secretly affiliated with the banished Iron Guard. In autumn 1942, they raided the newspaper offices, and discovered a submachine gun, stashed away by Stăncescu, who was immediately arrested, facing the death penalty; Vinea, acting alongside Antonescu's confidante Veturia Goga, managed to obtain Stăncescu's pardon.

Vinea still endorsed the annexation of Transnistria, but, later in life, also took credit for helping rescue Jews slated for extermination at Tiraspol and elsewhere. He also maintained contacts with the local Zionist resistance, represented by Zissu and Jean Cohen, sending them economic and social data which reached the Allies. Vinea similarly reported to the Zionists on the anti-German views of Romanian generals, beginning with Iosif Iacobici, as well as on the PNȚ's attempts to establish links with the Allies. Other reports allegedly included details on the PNȚ's right-wing leadership, grouped around Iuliu Maniu, Romulus Boilă, and Ilie Lazăr, being criticized by leftists such as Gheorghe Zane; these reports implied that much of the PNȚ was also "chauvinistic and antisemitic". As noted by Cohen, Vinea and Zissu, assisted by Șeicaru, also obtained from Antonescu promises of clemency toward Hungarian Jews who had fled for relative safety in Romania during 1944.

"Around 1943", Vinea, Stahl and Carandino were inducted by Revista Română, a "progressive" magazine founded by Zaharia Stancu and Krikor Zambaccian. After the turn of tides on the Eastern Front, Vinea debated with members of the democratic opposition who were willing to accept a Soviet occupation, noting that Stalin was set on "enthroning a communist regime". Meanwhile, in Curentul, he published thinly veiled criticism of Nazi terror in France. On August 23, 1944, a coalition of monarchists and communists removed and arrested Antonescu, denouncing the Axis alliance. In issues of Curentul which appeared between August 25 and August 29, Vinea, as the leading columnist, turned to open praise of the Allies and suggested that Soviet occupiers were Romania's friends. Days later, the Communist Party daily România Liberă hosted a piece denouncing Vinea's anti-Sovietism. In October, Revista Fundațiilor Regale carried Vinea's disquieted poem, Cobe ("Jinx"). By then, he had joined Galaction, Rosetti, Petre Ghiață, Isaia Răcăciuni, Valentin Saxone, and Tudor Teodorescu-Braniște, in setting up the democratic-liberal club Ideea.

=== Banishment and arrest ===
A stern demand for full censorship was published in November 1944 by the left-wingers at Orizont magazine. They referred to Vinea and other Antonescian journalists as having "died on August 23". Shortly after, Vinea received an interdiction to publish from the Propaganda Ministry, and was even threatened with prosecution for war crimes, but the order was revoked by Premier Petru Groza in 1946. His hopes of reviving Facla were quashed. An "utterly discreet" presence while the country underwent rapid communization, Vinea focused almost entirely on his new career, that of a translator from English and French. Returning from Palestine in 1945, Costin also took up that "obscure activity". Vinea, "panicked by the prospects of old age and failure", changed his lifestyle drastically, giving up smoking and drinking. He returned for a while to writing Lunatecii, but found himself rejected by two publishing houses, and exasperated by misunderstandings "with the three women I love, and with those other women who will not leave me alone." His standing as the keeper of three women, which are known to have included novelist Sidonia Drăgușanu, resulted in his being known, behind his back, as "Three Testicles" (Trei testicule). Henriette, who was told of his philandering, took the much younger writer Petru Dumitriu as her lover and then, divorcing Vinea, as her second husband.

In early 1946, Vinea and Carandino, alongside Radu Cioculescu and Gabriel Țepelea, were serving on the PNȚ Press Committee, which discussed new legislation targeting journalists. Vinea and Tzara met a final time when the latter came to Romania on an official visit, in 1947. That year, his work hosted by Carandino at Dreptatea, Vinea narrowly escaped arrest during the Tămădău Affair clampdown—having quit smoking, he decided to leave the PNȚ headquarters before a customary cigarette break; those who stayed were arrested on the spot. As the party leadership went on trial that November, he was called in as a witness, but did not show up. The full proclamation of a Romanian communist regime in 1948 drove Vinea into the cultural underground. As Cordoș notes, "Communist Romania [...] cast him as a marginal, for long pariah-like and unprintable [...]. (His broken-up course as a left-wing intellectual was weighed down by his explicitly anti-Stalinist attitude of the World War II period, which was unforgivable in that new era)." For a while, Vinea earned a meager living as a ghostwriter, but also as a warehouseman and porter. "Overnight", he taught himself to work as a plasterer, and found a brief employment in the field in 1949, assisting sculptor Oscar Han.

The newly established Writers' Union of Romania (USR) expelled Vinea from its ranks in 1950. While working for the candlemaker Aliciu, alongside other disgraced wartime journalists, he was periodically harassed by agents of the Securitate, who were reexamining his Evenimentul Zilei material. His final romantic relationship was with Elena Oghină. He moved with her from his mother's home on Uranus Hill to a townhouse on Braziliei Street, Dorobanți, thus "covering his tracks". The couple befriended Dumitriu, by then a lionized communist author, hosting the Dumitrius, as well as Bârna and Costin, in his new home, where they secretly discussed their hopes that communism would fall. Having parted with much of his art collection in order to support himself, Vinea sold Dumitriu his wife's treasure of gold coins, thus breaking nationalization laws. After 1947, he no longer left Bucharest, preoccupied with providing for his ailing mother. He was unconsoled when she eventually died, under his watch, c. 1952. Himself diagnosed with liver cancer, he was finally employed to write for the folding carton makers at Progresul Cooperative while also picking up a pension.

Vinea was finally allowed to rejoin the USR, and assigned to its "prose writers' section", studying and assimilating the aesthetic guidelines of socialist realism. With Demostene Botez and Alexandru A. Philippide, he was employed by the Committee for Cultural Establishments. All three were sacked in summer 1952, but allowed to publish in a new magazine, Cultura Poporului. However, Vinea was suspected of having spied for British Intelligence, and was avoided by members of the interwar left, with whom he had been friendly before—most glaringly, his former employer Stancu. In 1954, the regime issued a new order banning Vinea from its press. In 1956, ESPLA, the state publishing house, signed contracts with Vinea for his drawer novels, but did not deliver.

Instead, ESPLA hired Vinea on its team of translators and philologists. He produced Romanian versions of Edgar Allan Poe's romantic stories, especially Berenice, Ligeia, and The Fall of the House of Usher, and was involved in ESPLA's Shakespeare translation project, applying his poetic skill to Henry V, Hamlet, Othello, Macbeth, and The Winter's Tale. Elena Oghină regarded his as an extremely consuming, "diabolical", effort, adding: "The notebooks of his Shakespearean translations are a model in meticulousness. [...] he even came up with a code for translating from English, by establishing certain phonetic matches between English and Romanian. He was of the opinion that the frequency of vowels and consonants should generally be preserved". By 1959, Vinea was simultaneously working on his Poe translations, had rendered all 7,400 lines by Lucretius in dactylic hexameter, and was trying to begin his own historical novel, about Alexander the Great. He never finished the latter, and personally destroyed his entire work on Lucretius. Additionally, he corrected for print Costin's draft of Les Misérables, and completed other translations from Balzac, Romain Rolland, Washington Irving, and Halldór Laxness. Some of these were issued under Dumitriu's signature, which Vinea grudgingly allowed in exchange for money.

Reputedly, Vinea was being coerced to join the Communist Party and become a Securitate informant, but stood his ground. On November 14, 1958, the USR Committee took a vote to expel Vinea, Șerban Cioculescu, and Adrian Maniu. They were only spared following a passionate defense, mounted by poet Mihai Beniuc. Vinea and his lover were arrested and held in custody for several months in 1959, his gold coins having resurfaced (although possibly also because of Vinea's contacts with Dumitriu and other "revisionists"); her conversations with Vinea wire-tapped by the Securitate, Stahl herself was imprisoned for several months in 1960. In confinement, Vinea was reportedly bastinadoed so that he temporarily lost control of his limbs; Oghină also fell ill. They were eventually released following supplications from Nicolae Gh. Lupu, the personal physician of communist dictator Gheorghe Gheorghiu-Dej, with additional interventions from Rosetti and, possibly, Arghezi. Vinea was allowed to travel within the country by November 1961, when he wrote to his lover, from Constanța.

=== Final years and death ===
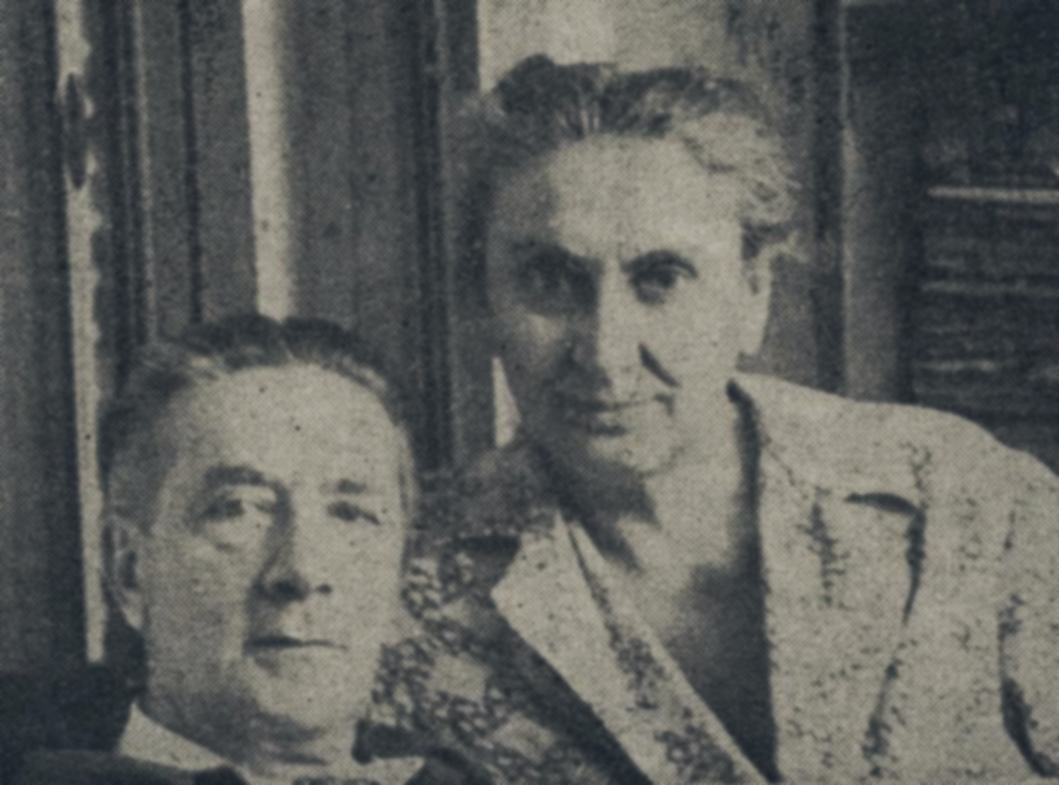
With wife Elena, c. 1960

Having made efforts to make his style palatable to the ideological censors, Vinea burned his more revealing manuscripts. He was allowed to publish in the literary magazines. In 1960, Anatol E. Baconsky and Petre Stoica's Steaua allocated space for an homage to Mihail Sadoveanu—according to Stoica, this was Vinea's first published text in some 15 years. His subsequent work, including essays honoring Arghezi and Camil Petrescu, was mainly taken up by that journal, which also interviewed him in 1963. Invited by Stoica to contribute additional homages for George Bacovia and Ion Agârbiceanu, he made a point of stating his refusal—suggesting that Bacovia was disgusting, and that Agârbiceanu's prose was almost entirely "worthless". In 1962, after Stoica's temporary departure, Steaua refused to publish fragments of Vinea's novels, breaking an earlier promise; other contributions on various topics appeared in Gazeta Literară and Orizont.

Together with Henriette, Vinea was also made to write for Glasul Patriei, a communist propaganda magazine aimed at the Romanian diaspora. This affiliation strangely reunited them with former traditionalist enemies such as Hodoș, also undergoing communist "recovery". He was featured there with notes on consecrated intellectual figures whom he had befriended, including Cocea, Enescu and Brâncuși, but also with an enthusiastic reception of the young socialist novelist, Titus Popovici, whom he had interviewed at Mogoșoaia Palace. Theologian Ioan I. Ică jr. proposes that Vinea and the other contributors "believed in their patriotic, inextricable, duty toward Romanian culture, but also toward their own talent and vocation, and [argued] that an offer for 'collaboration' should not have been cast aside, even at the expense of some moral and political concessions". While still at Glasul Patriei, Vinea finally turned to reportage writing, describing scenes from rural Romania in socialist realist style.

In most of their contributions, Vinea and Stahl censured or simply mocked Dumitriu, who had since defected to the West, and who stood accused of having plagiarized in most of his work, including from Vinea's own unpublished stories. This account contradicted Vinea's own deposition to the Securitate, where he only noted having helped Dumitriu with his writing. According to Stoica, in 1963 Vinea was also asked to declare that the Hamlet translation had been wrongly attributed to another author (whom Stoica identified as "P."). He refused to comply, noting: "I know that P. is a swindler, but he has been good to me"; in this private context, he confirmed that Hamlet was fully his own work. Late in her life, Stahl dismissed the Glasul Patriei articles as "utterly unconvincing, painful". In 2005, researcher Ion Vartic opined that the allegations of plagiarism were partly substantiated, but suggested a more "nuanced" verdict: Dumitriu's work should be read as a sample of collaborative fiction and intertextuality, involving both Vinea and Stahl.

In these late stages of his career, Vinea befriended the traditionalist poet Vasile Voiculescu, who was bedridden after a prolonged imprisonment, but also Călinescu, who had become the country's official literary historian. He secretly envied those who had left, feeling abandoned after Costin, who also spent time in communist prisons, emigrated in 1961. He wrote to Clara Haskil that "my life is with you two. What I still have left to live is quite insignificant." He asked Haskil to send him Fitzgerald's Tender Is the Night, which he read avidly, rekindling his own creative energies. Her sudden accidental death in December 1959 left him greatly distraught—this was noted by pianist and literary scholar Zoe Dumitrescu-Bușulenga, who played for him at literary reunions in writer Adrian Rogoz's house (also attended by Oscar Lemnaru).

Vinea was considered healthy enough in July 1962, when Lily Haskil encouraged him to resume his writing. In June 1963, the Vineas took a trip into Țara Moților, where they chanced upon Teodorescu; when inquired about the goal of his trip, Vinea reportedly answered: "I'm here to write down a reportage." Also that month, he was visited by Ilie Purcaru for an interview, which appeared in Luceafărul. Purcaru noted that Vinea made himself available in "that same setting of distinguished elegance, where old furniture and book spines with their patina will announce the blossom of [his] finely-worded manuscripts"; the host announced that he was working on the final draft of Lunatecii, to be presented to his publisher "before the end of this year". His cancer relapsed later that summer, during another vacation on Tataia Beach. He experienced "horrific agony", and had to undergo emergency surgery, which failed to address his health issues; aware that he was entering the final stages of his disease, he registered his civil marriage with Elena, also adopting her niece Voica as his own daughter.

As recounted by Elena, "Ion felt humiliated by his disease, he would beg forgiveness from all of us that his dying took so much of our time." His last visitors included Stoica, whom Vinea would not receive in his room, shouting out: "I don't want him to see me in my present ugliness". Shortly before his death on July 6, 1964, Vinea was given for review a rough draft of Ora fântânilor, which finally saw print some months later. His editor Ion Bănuță rushed to his side to show him a copy: "He was suddenly lively. He took the book into his hands, then to his lips. We were all crying. Then he faded away forever". Vinea's body was for a while on display at the USR House, which, Bârna argues, was a "sign of munificence" from his communist critics; it was afterward buried at Bellu Cemetery. On July 10, Geo Bogza, of unu fame, wrote in Contemporanul a posthumous homage to his former rival, the "prince of poets". On August 1, the exiled Monica Lovinescu honored Vinea with a broadcast on Radio Free Europe, calling attention to his modernist anti-communism. In 1965, having been polished by Stahl and Mihai Gafița, Lunatecii was also issued as a volume, followed in 1971 by the unfinished Venin de mai ("May Venom") and in 1977 by the anthology Publicistica literară, containing part of his literary criticism. In January 1966, Vinea's translation of Eugène Ionesco's Exit the King, possibly his last finished work in the field, was used for a production at the National Theater Bucharest.

== Literary contribution ==
=== Poetry ===
In his earliest Simbolul work, Vinea had embraced the "soft-tempered" side of the Symbolist movement, displaying the conventional influence of Alexandru Macedonski, Ion Pillat, and even Dimitrie Anghel; according to Dumitrescu-Bușulenga, he was a highly musical Symbolist, who modeled himself on Charles Baudelaire and Albert Samain. This trait was soon, but not fully, abandoned—in a 1942 note, Stephan Roll opined that Vinea continued to sail "the boat of those major Symbolists." According to Cernat, young Iovanaki shared with Tzara and Tzara's mentor Adrian Maniu an "acute awareness of the literary convention" and a bookish boredom with aestheticism; the three also borrowed "obviously" from Alfred Jarry and Jules Laforgue. The Gârceni poems show that Vinea was a step behind Tzara's anti-art and hedonistic tendencies: they wrote about exactly the same subjects, and in much the same way, notably sharing between them the "hanged man" metaphor, borrowed from Laforgue; but Vinea was more "crepuscular" and "elegiac". One of Vinea's pieces, still evidencing "conventional poetic rhetorics", is mostly as an ode to the fishermen of Tuzla:

seara bate semne pe far
peste goarnele vagi de apă
când se întorc pescarii cu stele pe mâini
și trec vapoarele și planetele

Translation:

the evening stamps signs on the lighthouse
over the vague bugles of water
when fishermen return with stars on their arms
and ships and planets pass by

Influences from Adrian Maniu were read by George Călinescu in a 1916 poem that depicts King Ferdinand I ordering the general mobilization:

Regele, l-am văzut — pe calul cum sunt brazdele câmpului
turnat în fața steagurilor neliniștite,
cugetul nemilos îi crestase un șanț deschis pe frunte,
uitase de mult să respire.

Translation:

The king, I saw him—on his horse, the color of furrows
cast in front of the hectic flags,
a merciless thought had cut an open ditch on his brow,
he had long forgotten to breathe.

As Cernat notes, Vinea only embraced Futurism because it resembled his own "simultanist" art, which nonetheless remained "controlled by artistic intelligence, far removed from the anarchic radicalism of Futurism". The same had been argued by Lovinescu Sr, who saw Vinea as an "extremist", but a "restrained" and "intellectual" one. Among the later scholars, Mircea Vaida, who personally witnessed Vinea's creative process, reports that he had a "deeply classical substratum", being intellectually closer to Lucretius than to modernist poets. Never adopted by the Dadaists, Vinea felt naturally affinities with the conservative side of Dada, illustrated by the "beautiful and virginal" poetry of Hugo Ball. His comparative moderation was even esteemed by traditionalists such as Const. I. Emilian, who treated many other avant-garde writers as a threat to social hygiene. Dianu once commented that Vinea shared with the traditionalists both a love of local folklore and for the works of Reiner Maria Rilke, but that he resented their mysticism, which he found distasteful.

Vinea's embrace of modernism, always censured by his classicist mind and interest in cultural synthesis, has prompted scholar Marian Victor Buciu to argue that he was in some ways an anticipatory postmodern. As argued by Buciu, his very qualification as an "extremist" only makes sense within the specific framework of Romanian literature, which "has sacralized its traditional formats." If Vinea's 1920s poetry was more evidently connected with Surrealism and Expressionism, with echoes from Apollinaire and Georges Linze, it was always superimposed over a classical Symbolist structure; Buciu believes that the "neo-romantic fashion" took over in Ora fântânilor, subduing his Expressionism, and eventually his Symbolism as well. In Lamento, which sets the tone for his 1920s poetry, the setting is Symbolist:

Ploi de martie, tragedie citadină,
arborii își fac semn ca surdomuții.
Pentru spectacolul de adio,
plângeți lacrămi de făină,
printre sonerii, lumină,
de Sfântul Bartolomeu al afișelor

Translation:

Rains in March, an urban tragedy,
trees wave to each other like deaf-mutes.
For your going-away show,
cry out your flour tears,
along the chimes, along the light,
for a placards' St. Bartholomew

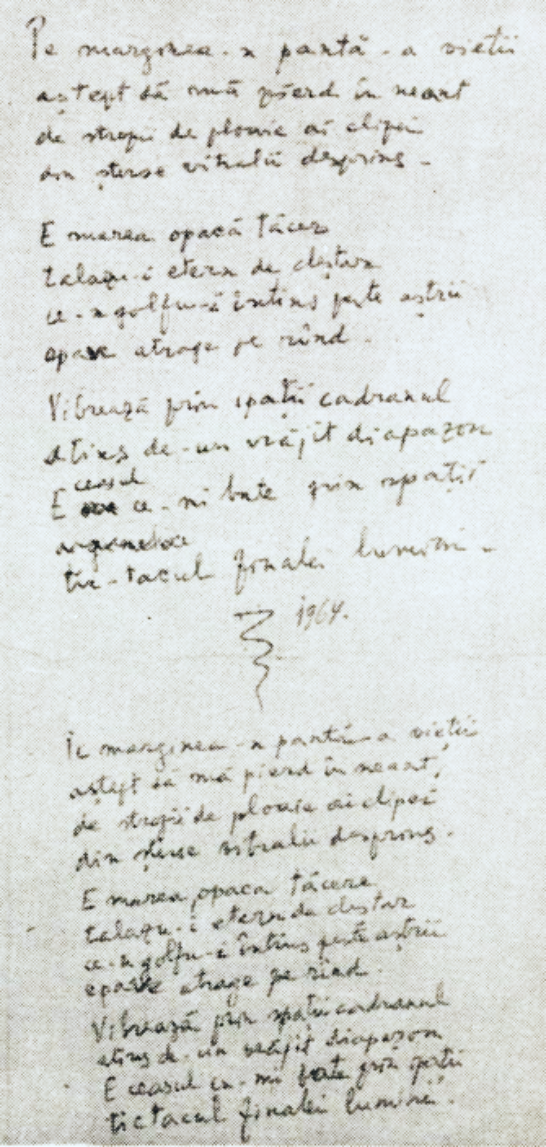
One of Vinea's final poems, manuscript version in his handwriting (August 1964)

Despite their many differences in style and ideology, Vinea, Barbu and Mateiu Caragiale shared a passion for Poe, a debt of inspiration to Romania's "obscure" Balkan substratum, and various other mannerisms. In 1928, Barbu, turning to a cerebral hermeticism, had settled on the notion that Vinea was his inferior, one of the "lazy" and "hybrid" poets, who relied on spontaneity and whim; as noted by Nicolae Manolescu, there was "nothing hermetic" about Vinea, the "pretentious troubadour". Călinescu also described Vinea as an author of "loosened sentimentality" and a Romanian Cocteau, while Tudor Vianu argued that Vinea's lyrical poetry was symptomatic for a new poetic consciousness, with poets as "empty vessels" for "the ineffable". Vinea was not, however, the purely impulsive modernist: evidence suggests that he dissembled surrealist automatism by simply rearranging consciously written poetry into unusual formats.

=== Main prose, fragments, and apocrypha ===
Researcher Alexandru Piru suggests that virtually all of Vinea's poems, including those under print at the time of his death, were entirely composed before 1944. By contrast, his work in prose was a lifetime engagement—with its many unfinished products, some of which lead back to 1914; as Carandino assesses, they are of a "fulgurating beauty". Following his own critical blueprint during his Contimporanul years, Vinea moved between conventional storytelling and modernist, often autofictional, short prose that was heavily indebted to Urmuz. Examples include, in 1922, a parody of Hamlet; in 1923, a Futurist prose poem about the coming world revolution (signed as "Ivan Aniew"); and, in 1927, Victoria sălbatică. According to Manolescu, Descântecul și Flori de lampă is a failed work, ranking below models such as Macedonski and Anghel, and announcing Vinea's turn to the "unbearable kitsch". These traits he integrated in Paradisul suspinelor, one of the most experimental (and possibly the earliest) avant-garde novel or novella by a Romanian—although it remains shadowed by Caragiale's Craii de Curtea-Veche. He added to the mix psychoanalytical and sexual themes, with an unreliable narrator that hinted the influence of André Gide. According to Vianu, much of the novel is also an imagist rearrangement of borrowings from Arghezi's prose, with echoes from Baudelaire's synaesthesia.

Often compared with Craii..., and possibly hinting at it, Lunatecii is, in part, a standard decadent novel which discusses degeneration theory and the "thinning" of aristocratic blood. It lacks a true dramatic structure, leading Manolescu to argue that Vinea did not have "a sense of the epic": "The value [rests] in the slowness of its narrative, in its poetic suggestion." His storytelling techniques were criticized by commentators such as Eugen Simion and Ovid Crohmălniceanu, who assessed that the central conflict was rather simplistic. Vinea himself described the novel as "fantasy realistic" and "social realistic", but, as Zaharia-Filipaș suggests, any sort of realism was "tentative, not vocational." According to philologist Angelo Mitchievici, Vinea was "ironic" and "camp" in reusing decadent conventions from Poe, Barbey d'Aurevilly, Huysmans and Wilde, "inventing himself as a character". There are also direct and indirect echoes from Fitzgerald's novels: themes that recall Tender Is the Night, and a motto from The Great Gatsby.

Vinea shows up in the protagonist Lucu Silion: an effeminate superfluous man in his thirties, inactive as a lawyer and has-been as a writer, dreaming of a never-ending twilight in his luxurious mansion. He is a last male descendant of an illustrious and principled family (its story, Simion writes, is "thrilling"), but surrounds himself with misfits, and pursues three women at once: a Greek belle, a delicate Catholic, and a secretive lady who stands for "Byzantinism tainted by the occult". The latter is Ana Ulmu, whose affair with Silion drives fiancé Arghir to a grotesque suicide. Ana also attempts to kill herself, and fails, leaving Silion to ruin himself paying for her recovery in hospital. Lunatecii reaches its climax when Silion attempts to kidnap Ana from her new husband, and ends up being shot and injured by him. Lucu experiences a rapid descent into poverty, alcoholism, and vagrancy, only commending the respect of fellow drunks.

Part of the novel is Vinea's barely disguised confession to Stahl about his philandering, with recounts of sexual debauchery. Critics have dismissed such episodes as "in bad taste" and "penny dreadful". Alexandru Bogdan-Pitești is a major character here (as well as in Venin de mai): as "Adam Gună", he sponsors libertine escapades and subversive literary societies, cultivating concupiscence and amoralism. Lunatecii also reveals Vinea's fascination and disgust with Nae Ionescu, the far-right journalist and philosopher. He appears as "Fane Chiriac", the man with "devilish jade eyes" and "cynical lucidity". Tzara may also have been caricatured here as the thick-skinned charlatan, "Dr. Costi Barbu"—he dispenses advice about consciously living like a boor; Alexandru Rosetti is seemingly the heroic "Filip", who offers Silion his care and protection.

The unfinished Venin de mai was "edited in a controversial manner, with repetitions and reprisals". Although including precise episodes in the author's life, such as Nicolae Vinea's accidental death or Ion's love for Tana Qvil (appearing as "Tanit") and Solomon-Callimachi ("Dida Pabst"), its narrative, reconstructed from disparate notes, was greatly affected by editorial choices in which Vinea had no say. The result is described by Manolescu as the "failed Bildungsroman" of painter Andrei Mile, another Vinea alter-ego. Rather than aboulic, like Silion, Mile is driven by the thrill of extreme experiences, only to find himself clueless and desperate. He falls under Gună's spell at an early stage in his life, which allows Vinea to explore legends surrounding Bogdan-Pitești's interloper status. Sexual initiations occupy a central part of the narrative, and, Manolescu argues, are of no stylistic importance; overall, the book is "more somber" than Lunatecii, but "lengthy and boring". Part of the plot is localized on the (fictional) Danube islet Vadul Istrului, a magical but malaria-stricken place.

The Purcaru interview shows Vinea explaining modernism as a "failed experience", the product of youth seeking "intransigent poses, terrible whims, and some of the more extravagant theories". He claimed that the only modernists to have succeeded were those who, like Paul Éluard and Vladimir Mayakovsky, had incorporated realism and their own originality; he also regarded neomodernism as "utterly reactionary." In depicting Andrei as a Constructivist, Venin de mai settles Vinea's scores with Tzara (appearing here "under the royal name of Clovis"), by hinting that Dada poetry is simply "illegible", and with Constantin Brâncuși, depicted as the tedious sage "Gorjan" (his portrayal, Manolescu notes, "could have been better"). In addition to his signed work, Vinea authored passages of texts which survive in Dumitriu's novel, Family Chronicle, and its spin-off cycle. They include a fragment about fugitive serfs on the Danube, the history of revolutionary conspiracies in 1917 Iași, and scathing memoirs about Nae Ionescu and Ion Călugăru. Vinea publicly complained that Lunatecii had to be rewritten because of these borrowings, but, according to Vartic, the claim should be treated with skepticism.

== Legacy ==
=== Tributes and posthumous controversies ===
In a 1971 piece, Romulus Dianu recorded his sadness that Vinea was no longer being read by his younger peers. A decade later, Stahl also worried that Vinea's late publication had rendered him insignificant to Romanian letters, his novels "problematizing defects and qualities that are antique, and therefore uninteresting." Contrarily, Monica Lovinescu asserted that Vinea's "frozen evolution" during socialist realism had rendered him "this paradoxical service: Ion Vinea is perhaps more relevant today than ever before." He was "young, the same age as those young people who cannot but search for new ways ahead, who cannot but recall with nostalgia [Vinea's] itinerary for poetic revolt." Unwittingly, however, Vinea's pronouncements on folk tradition and Romania's primacy in modern art were recycled during the late stages of communism by the protochronist nationalists, who used them against the West.

The corpus of Vinea's works, put out by Editura Dacia in the 1970s, had important omissions and, Ungureanu notes, presented Vinea as "a star among the underground communists whom the new epoch had honored time and again." Țara poeților ("Land of Poets"), a 1971 anthology put out by Editura Albatos for the Communist Party's golden jubilee, had a poem by Vinea—despite him being a non-communist. In 1983, writer Nicolae Țic placed Vinea among the interwar authors who had intervened "to preserve a democratic climate, in support of the common man, of the worker and the peasant". Also then, historian Mihai E. Ionescu described Vinea's contribution to Evenimentul Zilei among the acts of infiltration "by journalists of democratic and anti-fascist orientation". In the anti-communist exile, poet Ion Caraion, himself a one-time member of the Iron Guard, reminded the public that Vinea had been one of the "known adversaries of the Iron Guard whom the communist regime had sentenced for their 'fascism'".

Various new editions appeared sporadically. A selection of his poems, translated into French by Dan Ion Nasta, appeared to critical acclaim in 1982. Another selected prose volume was put out by Dumitru Hîncu in 1984, as Săgeata și arabescul ("The Arrow and Arabesque"), but had to feature samples of his Glasul Patriei propaganda. The same year, Zaharia-Filipaș also began issuing a new edition of Vinea's complete writings, supervised by Zigu Ornea at Editura Minerva. Widow Elena Vinea inherited her husband's collection of manuscripts. Before her death in September 1989, she helped to publish the lesser known Tzara pieces from the Gârceni era. Her daughter Voica used the surname "Iovanache-Vinea" until November 1980, when she simplified it to "Vinea". She pursued a career in film editing, winning the a prize at the Cupa de cristal gala in 1987.

After the successful anti-communist revolt of December 1989, Vinea's work returned to fuller recognition—a new poetry selection appeared in 1995 as Moartea de cristal ("Crystal Death"). In a July 1990 retrospective, journalist Bedros Horasangian listed Vinea among the "great masters of the trade"—alongside Brunea-Fox, Cocea, Mircea Grigorescu, George Ivașcu, and Tudor Teodorescu-Braniște. At an exhibit in December 1992, Neosymbolist Monica Gorovei showed her painting based on, and named after, Vinea's Ora fântânilor. Following the change of regimes, Giurgiu's house of culture was renamed after Ion Vinea. By 2021, items on permanent display there included a bust of the poet (recast from an interwar piece by Milița Petrașcu), and a memorabilia room. A reissue of his complete works was being put out by Zaharia-Filipaș, at her own expense, at the George Călinescu Institute and, later, the Museum of Romanian Literature. Its eleventh volume, appearing in 2019, covered the full scope of his Antonescu-era works. Writers Nicolae Tzone and Ion Lazu founded an eponymous publishing house and also took his works, putting up a memorial plaque on Braziliei Street; these projects earned endorsement from Voica, who inherited the Braziliei Street home. Vinea's work and biography remain somewhat unfamiliar to the public, including his native city. Though one of his poems was used in the Romanian Baccalaureate examination of 2017, a majority of news outlets reporting on this wrongly credited him as "Ion Voinea".

=== As a literary character ===
Fictionalized elements of Vinea's life appeared not just in his own prose, but also in that of his peers. Tzara's unfinished novel Faites vos jeux, partly published in 1923–1924, has a thinly disguised portrayal of his friend, as "T. B."—a young man Tzara describes as "older than the rest, brighter, prettier, wittier, [knowing] how to steer the tight leash of public attention into a solid, indisputable, esteem." In 1927, Vinea was a possible inspiration for "Șcheianu", the drug-addicted protagonist of Cezar Petrescu's Întunecare ("Darkening"); he may also be the Romanian intellectual briefly mentioned in Tender Is the Night.

The writer is transparently satirized, as "Ionel Vineș", in Promoția '907, a 1935 novel by the conservative Theodor Rășcanu. Vinea is also an easily recognizable presence in Family Chronicle—the part of it that was certainly authored by Dumitriu. Vinea appeared as several characters in Henriette Stahl's novels, beginning with a vengeful depiction, as "Camil Tomescu", in the 1965 Fratele meu, omul ("My Brother Man"). This was also the first of several portrayals in works by Vinea's wives and lovers. Publishing her only volume of poetry in 1968, Tana Qvil opened it with an intertextual reference to her former husband; two years later, Cutava published her autobiographical novel Strada Vânătorilor ("Hunters' Street"), described by Cordoș as featuring "very transparent" allusions to Vinea.
