= Ion Călugăru =

Romanian novelist, short story writer, journalist and critic

Ion Călugăru Ștrul Leiba Croitoru B. Croitoru
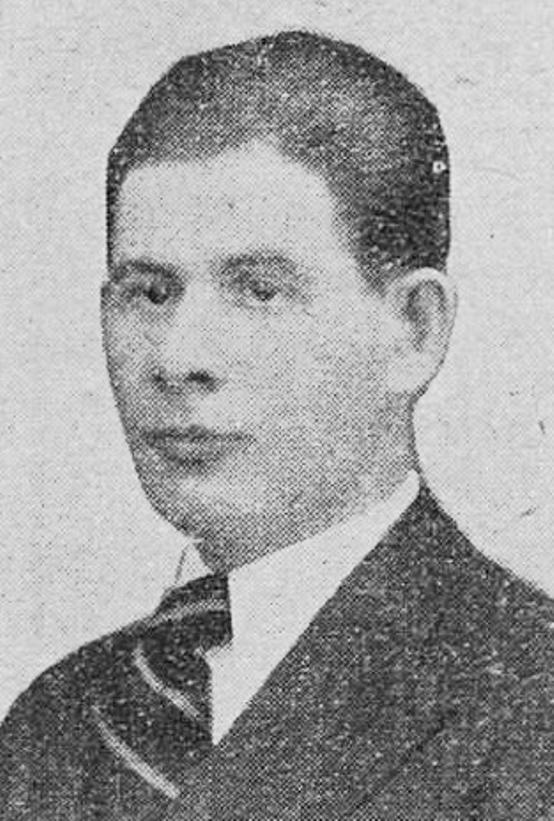
- Călugăru, photographed before 1935
- Born: February 14, 1902; Dorohoi, Kingdom of Romania
- Died: May 22, 1956 (aged 54); Bucharest, Romanian People's Republic
- Occupations: novelist, short story writer, dramatist, journalist, film critic, art critic, literary critic, theater critic, screenwriter, poet
- Writing career
- Pen name: Moș Ion Popescu
- Period: 1920–1956
- Genres: adventure novel, Bildungsroman, biography, essay, novella, sketch story, reportage
- Literary movement: Sburătorul, Contimporanul, Expressionism, Surrealism, Social Realism, Socialist Realism

Ion Călugăru (Romanian pronunciation: [iˈon kəˈluɡəru]; born Ștrul Leiba Croitoru, also known as Buium sin Strul-Leiba Croitoru, B. Croitoru; February 14, 1902 – May 22, 1956) was a Romanian novelist, short story writer, journalist, and critic. As a figure on Romania's modernist scene throughout the early interwar period, he was noted for combining a picturesque perspective on the rural Jewish-Romanian community, to which he belonged, with traditionalist and avant-garde elements. His early works, including the novel Copilăria unui netrebnic ("The Childhood of a Ne'er-do-well"), bring together elements of Social Realism, Surrealism and Expressionism over a conventional narrative line based on oral tradition and the classics of Romanian literature. Călugăru, who moved from the moderate Contimporanul magazine to the Surrealist platform unu, was also one of the main contributors to Integral, a tribune for avant-garde literature in general. Although publicly known for his socialist convictions and his far left inclinations, he was, through his position at Cuvântul newspaper, present in the proximity of fascist circles, and had an ambiguous attitude toward his employer, the far right thinker Nae Ionescu.

Shortly before the establishment of Romania's communist regime, Călugăru embraced Socialist Realism and became and made official his relationship with the ruling Romanian Communist Party. During this final period of his career, he wrote the controversial novel Oțel și pîine ("Steel and Bread"), an epic of industrialization, widely seen as one of the most representative samples of politicized literature to have seen print in 1950s Romania. Despite his formal affiliation to Marxism-Leninism, Călugăru had doubts about the new political realities and commented with sarcasm on the regime's self-contradictions. These opinions were expressed in his private diaries, which became the subject of research and public scrutiny some fifty years after his death.

== Biography ==
=== Early life and debut ===
A native of Dorohoi shtetl, in the historical region of Moldavia, Ion Călugăru spent his early years in relative cultural isolation among the local Jewish community. This environment, which was later the main focus of his literary work, was described by literary historian Ovid Crohmălniceanu as "not actually a ghetto life", but made distinct from other environments for being both Jewish and Moldavian. Researcher Paul Cernat also noted that Călugăru, like his future Surrealist colleague Benjamin Fondane, illustrated the Jewish section of the Romanian avant-garde and its connections with the local Hasidic tradition.

Shortly after World War I, the young author moved to Bucharest, together with his poet friend Sașa Pană. He managed to attend the Matei Basarab High School, but lived precariously—his family lacked the means to support him. According to his friends' testimonies, he was still noticeably poor, well into the 1930s.

Together with Fondane and Pană, he was one of the regulars at the literary parties hosted by controversial businessman Alexandru Bogdan-Pitești. The three became well acquainted with the avant-garde society of Bucharest. Their informal literary circle played host to by F. Brunea-Fox, Henri Gad, Armand Pascal, Claude Sernet-Cosma, and Ilarie Voronca, as well as, on occasion, artists Iosif Ross and Nicolae Tonitza, and poet Claudia Millian.

B. Croitoru received his first encouragements from critic Eugen Lovinescu, who published his texts in Sburătorul magazine. Lovinescu was a teacher at Matei Basarab, and decided to give employ his student as an editor and book reviewer. He is credited with having coined and assigned Croitoru the pen name Ion Călugăru (from călugărul, "the monk").

While with Sburătorul, Călugăru published some of his first autobiographical fragments, which were later integrated in some of his novels. The aspiring writer was focusing his work on prose pieces largely inspired by Romanian folklore and the 19th-century adventure novel, publishing, under the pen name Moș Ion Popescu ("Old Man Ion Popescu"), short stories with hajduk protagonists. Cernat, who sees these writings as indebted to the more popular genre fiction novels of N. D. Popescu-Popnedea, suggests that Călugăru may have tried his hand in this field only because he needed the money.

By January 1923, Călugăru was becoming involved with Fondane's theatrical company Insula. His texts were given public readings, but Insula dissolved itself before Călugăru could deliver his planned conference (on the life and work of Romania's traditionalist poet George Coșbuc). His actual editorial debut came later that year, when he published Caii lui Cibicioc ("Cibicioc's Horses"), a volume of short stories.

=== Contimporanul, unu and the socialist press ===
Shortly after this period, Călugăru became one of the contributors to Ion Vinea's modernist magazine Contimporanul. Later that decade however, he parted with this group and began working with the original representatives of Romanian Surrealism, contributing his works to publications such as Integral (which he helped establish) and unu. He was also a member of Integral's editorial staff, alongside writers Brunea-Fox and Voronca, with artist M. H. Maxy as administrative director. In doing so, he broke with Vinea's moderation, eclecticism and political ambiguity to side with what was the more radical and most explicitly left-wing tendency among young writers. In 1932 however, Călugăru was, with poet N. Davidescu, novelist Sergiu Dan, journalists Nicolae Carandino and Henric Streitman, and writer-director Sandu Eliad, a member of the editorial staff for Vinea's daily Facla.

Around that time, Călugăru befriended poet Stephan Roll and, through him, made new contacts with Fondane, who had himself embraced Surrealism but was living at the time in France. The three were in correspondence, and, according to Roll's testimony, Călugăru was making efforts at establishing Fondane's reputation at home by reviewing his French-language poetry. Călugăru's social networking with the avant-garde also earned him a profile among Bucharest's informal avant-garde salons. According to the personal recollections of art historian Amelia Pavel (at the time a high school student debuting on the social scene), Călugăru frequented the same social circle as cartoonist Saul Steinberg and poet Sesto Pals.

In tandem, he was building connections with the militant socialist or communist groups: a contributor to the leftist platform Cuvântul Liber, Călugăru also sent his work to be published in more radical magazines sponsored by the outlawed Romanian Communist Party (PCR)—Reporter and Era Nouă, both edited by pro-PCR activist N. D. Cocea. Himself a Marxist, Crohmălniceanu noted that Călugăru's gradual move toward a Marxist outlook was determined by his commitment to Surrealism. This path, he proposed, made Călugăru a voice similar to those of other left-wing Surrealists: Louis Aragon, Robert Desnos, Paul Éluard, Pablo Neruda internationally, Geo Bogza and Miron Radu Paraschivescu locally; but also that it made him stand in contrast to younger Surrealists who chose libertarian socialism (Gherasim Luca and Dolfi Trost). Around 1937, Călugăru was also a columnist for Reporter, with a series of social and satirical pieces collectively titled Urangutania (from urangutan, Romanian for "orangutan"). He was also a sporadic contributor to writer Isac Ludo's leftist publication, Adam, and had personal contacts with various leftist organizations representing the Jewish community.

The leftist politicization of Romania's avant-garde and its connections with a banned party soon alarmed the political establishment: like other members of the unu faction, Călugăru was constantly monitored and informed upon by the Romanian Kingdom's secret service, Siguranța Statului. This resulted in a sizable personal file, which informed on not just his underground connections but also, reflecting the secret policemen's personal antisemitic tendencies rather than official policy, his publicized critique of fascism and Nazi Germany. The Siguranța operatives therefore found cause for concern in one of Călugăru's mocking essays, targeting Nazi leader Adolf Hitler.

The dossier also includes the denunciations provided by Sergiu Dan's brother, Mihail, who had infiltrated the unu group. His notes document the conflict between Vinea's publications and the unu group from an interpersonal perspective: Mihail Dan alleged that Roll, together with his fellow writers Sașa Pană and Geo Bogza, exercised absolute control over unu, leading into an explicitly communist and artistically inferior direction.

=== Integral theorist and film critic ===
The diverse allegiances affected Călugăru's literary work, being reflected in a new series of works, many of which were urban-themed and distinctly modernist. According to Crohmălniceanu's classification, the subsequent works fall into two main categories: on one hand, the urban-themed modernist novels, including Paradisul statistic ("Statistical Paradise", 1926), Omul de după ușă ("The Man behind the Door", 1931), Don Juan Cocoșatul ("Don Juan the Hunchback", 1934), Erdora (1934), alongside the 1935 short story collection De la cinci până la cinci ("From Five to Five"); on the other, the writings with rural or mixed rural-urban subjects—Abecedar de povestiri populare ("A Primer of Folk Stories", 1930), Copilăria unui netrebnic (1936), Trustul ("The Trust", 1937), Lumina primăverii ("The Light of Spring", 1947).

In joining the common effort of Integral writers, Călugăru threw his support behind a literary movement that viewed itself as both urban and innovative, theorizing connections between the creative human and the modern rhythms of technology. His interest in cutting edge modernism was also leading him to explore the world of cinema, as a result of which he was also one of Integral's film critics, with Fondane, Roll, Barbu Florian, I. Peretz. This activity too evidenced his political advocacy: Călugăru's articles described film as the new, proletarian and revolutionary, means of expression, the myth of a society in the process of adopting collectivism. His texts, which coincided with the silent film era, trusted that the popularly acclaimed pantomime acts of Charlie Chaplin, like the Fratellinis' circus acts, were especially relevant for understanding the modern public's tastes. In 1933, Călugăru was to publish the first-ever Romanian monograph on Chaplin's life and career.

Like other staff members of Integral, he also contemplated a new role for theater. Shunning the elitist traditions in drama, he demanded the incorporation of elements from cinema, cabaret or the circus, while calling on actors and directors to prioritize improvisation. This ideological set was interpreted by Paul Cernat as an indirect echo of Futurism, particularly given its "optimism" and its sympathy for street theater. The taste for pantomime evidenced by most of the Integral contributors was explained by film historian Iordan Chimet in reference to "materiality": "[Pantomime] does not refuse the word of objects and the artist will use things, all sorts of things, in order to complete his act of virtuosity. He nevertheless also discovers their secretive nature, unexplored and unsuspected in everyday life". In the same context, Călugăru and Maxy called attention to artistic developments taking place inside the Soviet Union, suggesting that the proletkult movement was a model to follow in setting up a "new" theater. While Cernat rates such contributions as among the "most philosoviet" in Integral's pages, he also finds that they show the manner in which Călugăru blended his communist sympathies with political ideas from opposite sources: the philosophy of Friedrich Nietzsche and the syndicalist doctrines of Georges Sorel. Both Maxy and Călugăru were however more directly involved in the promotion of modern Yiddish or Romanian drama, promoting the international Vilna Troupe after its 1923 relocation to Bucharest. While Maxy became the Troupe' designer, Călugăru directly assisted manager Jacob Sternberg and administrative director Mordechai Mazo in running the company, becoming secretary of the artistic committee.

Călugăru's theory on modern art, as outlined in one of his columns for the paper, saw in it a synthesis "for all modern experiences". The liberating force of modernity in providing authenticity to artistic expression was voiced by him with the words: "We no longer have our brains in our hearts, nor our hearts in our sexes..." His taste for outspoken rebellion was also manifested during his time at unu. The magazine, deeming him "the pawn of 20th century literature", published his 1928 appeal to the population of his native Dorohoi, reading: "You are goitered! Only one of you ever had the audacity of wearing his goiter on his face." Like other Integral contributors, Călugăru offered praise to the older and more influential poet and prose writer Tudor Arghezi. In Călugăru's case, this fused with admiration for Arghezi's outspoken anticlericalism, which became the topic of one of his Integral articles (published in 1925).

=== Cuvântul years ===
Despite gravitating around the radical left and the artistic avant-garde, Ion Călugăru pursued his collaboration with the increasingly far right periodical Cuvântul, led by the antisemitic philosopher Nae Ionescu. Researcher Ioana Pârvulescu, noting that Călugăru's work for the paper predated an explicitly fascist agenda, drew attention to the fact that Călugăru and novelist Mihail Sebastian were two of some eleven Jews still employed by Cuvântul in 1933. At around the same time, he was also employed as an editor by the literary newspaper Vremea, which acted as a mouthpiece for left-wing intellectuals, many of them Communist Party favorites.

Călugăru regularly published two or three articles per Cuvântul issue. He preserved his editorial position up to 1934, when the newspaper was abruptly banned by the government of King Carol II for offering support to the violent fascist movement known as the Iron Guard. One of his contributions for the newspaper was the theatrical column, when he filled in for the regular reviewer, Alexandru Kirițescu. This assignment made Călugăru a main protagonist of a 1929 scandal. It was sparked by his highly critical and sarcastic reception of Rodia de aur ("The Golden Pomegranate"), the play co-written by Păstorel Teodoreanu and Adrian Maniu, and culminated with reports that Teodoreanu took revenge by seeking out and physically assaulting Călugăru at his Cuvântul desk. Călugăru later filed a legal complaint against his alleged aggressor, claiming that Păstorel had also made death threats against him. According to writer Vlaicu Bârna, who places the "embarrassing scene" in relation to another one of Păstorel's works, Teodoreanu was proud of assaulting his reviewer, whom he called an "ass". In 1932, Călugăru also played a part in the major cultural debate surrounding literature, censorship and pornography, voicing his opinions on the first Romanian edition of D. H. Lawrence's Lady Chatterley's Lover.

As his private diaries show, Călugăru had a complex relationship with Ionescu. Literary historian Cornelia Ștefănescu, who researched the notebooks, described the 1930s Călugăru as a suspicious and insecure intellectual, and noted that this character trait somehow affected the contacts between him and his antisemitic employer—although Călugăru accepted Ionescu's invitations to supper, he feared that the far right figure was secretly despising him. In 1937, he described Ionescu as vain and ambitious, a portrait completed in 1949 with verdicts such as: "intelligent and sophistical, logical and a bit insane"; "With great qualities, but dominated by urges which crush his qualities. Wasn't he the one who created the antisemitism of these past years?" Commenting on the same texts, literary critic Al. Săndulescu further suggested that Călugăru, like Sebastian, ended up being "overwhelmed" by Nae Ionescu's charisma. The verdict is echoed by Cernat, who notes that, contrary to popular belief, Ionescu still had his admirers on the left. According to Cernat, Călugăru married his respect for Ionescu with his "Zionist, syndicalist and even communized positions."

According to Iron Guard member and journalist N. Roșu, Călugăru and Sebastian were among those called upon by Ionescu in autumn 1933, to be informed that the paper was backing revolutionary fascism. Commenting on this testimony, cultural historian Z. Ornea concludes that, even though the Iron Guard activist Vasile Marin was then made a member of the editorial staff, "nobody left, perhaps thinking that this was a temporary tactic". The writer additionally met with young members of Ionescu's Trăirist circle, befriending the young Orientalist, novelist and philosopher Mircea Eliade. Eliade, who saw the opportunity of turning Cuvântul into a venue for dialogue between far right and Marxist intellectuals, also befriended the PCR member (and suspected Siguranța double agent) Belu Zilber, who was by then a friend of Călugăru's.

The dichotomy between Călugăru and his employers was the subject of public debate in the early 1930s, as reported by Vlaicu Bârna. Bârna recalled comments from various journalists, including another one of Călugăru's far right colleagues, N. Davidescu: "You don't know, but Nae Ionescu does, that without the Jews there can be no press." By 1936, the fascization of the Romanian national press made such contacts highly improbable: in early 1936, Vremea dropped its left-wing agenda and sacked its Jewish contributors, Călugăru included, and embraced Iron Guard politics.

Călugăru's permutations were registered with skepticism by his Surrealist colleagues—notably Stephan Roll, who criticized Călugăru's positioning in a 1934 letter to their mentor Fondane. Roll, who noted that his friend had just married a female painter who was both "funny and intelligent", mentioned the financial difficulties Călugăru was facing after Cuvântul had been shut down. Nevertheless, he also suggested that Călugăru had relied on his trust for Ionescu, who had even "impressed him" with his intelligence, adding: "Călugăru never had the courage of taking a clear stand. He is rather humble and a victim of all those generations of persecuted people that he carries within him. I tried to bring him over to my side, I tried to reach out my hand. He took distance. Ever since, I've been leaving him be, I rarely see him, but I pity his fate." The secret reports signed by Mihail Dan describe Călugăru's gradual distancing from the unu group, congratulating him, Brunea-Fox and Voronca for having taken their leave from "the cloaca".

=== During and after World War II ===
Ion Călugăru survived World War II and the antisemitic Ion Antonescu regime, reportedly shielded from reprisals by his friend, the influential novelist Liviu Rebreanu (otherwise known for his far right sympathies). However, the Antonescu government included his name on a list of banned Jewish authors, which was circulated throughout the country. Sebastian, himself marginalized for his ethnic origins, recorded in his Journal entry for June 19, 1941 a chance encounter with his former colleague. The fragment presents Călugăru as "the same small, nervous, confused, hysterical, obsessed man from Cuvântul", who "speaks terribly fast, without even looking to see whether you are listening or not." The Journal mentions Călugăru's wartime literary projects: "He has written a play about John the Baptist, and another one about Charlie Chaplin for both theatre and cinema, using a new technical formula. He has also written a book of poems in Yiddish."

Sebastian wrote that his friend was dismissing rumors about the Nazi-led attack on the Soviet Union, which was being secretly prepared with Antonescu's support. Călugăru claimed that this account was British manipulation, suggesting that "if Hitler dared to attack the Russians he would be crushed." Still, Călugăru stood out among Romanian Jews for condemning passive compliance with Antonescu's orders, asking his coreligionists not to recognize the collaborationist Central Jewish Office.

Călugăru found himself promoted by the new authorities after the August 1944 Coup overthrew Antonescu. On September 1, Călugăru joined Emil Dorian and Ury Benador in creating the Union of Jewish Writers. The inaugural meeting, held in Dorian's residence, was attended and poorly reviewed by Sebastian. His Journal calls the other participants "nonentities", and the gathering "a mixture of desperate failure, thundering mediocrity, old ambitions and troubles, [...] impudence and ostentation."

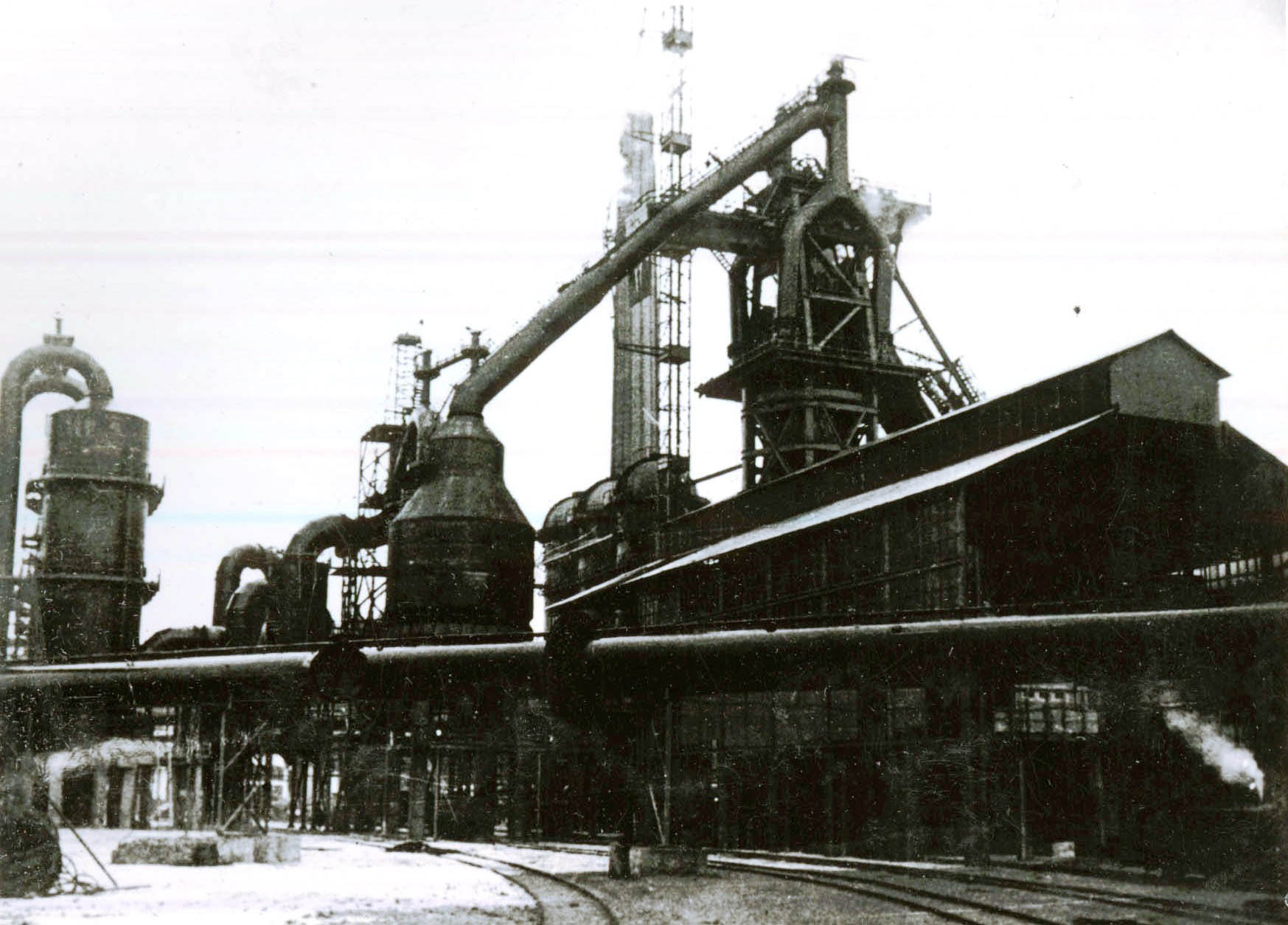
Hunedoara Steel Foundry in 1952, around the time of Călugăru's visit

Shortly afterward, as the PCR gained momentum with Soviet support, Călugăru was one of the ten authors to be instated or reinstated as members of the Romanian Writers' Society as replacements for some banned or fugitive former members who had been deemed pro-fascist. On January 9, 1948, he was made General Secretary of the Writers' Society, and as such second in line to the Society's new president, Zaharia Stancu. In the years after 1944, and especially after the creation of Communist Romania, Ion Călugăru began moving away from his modernist themes, and closer to Socialist Realism, becoming recognized as one of the leading Romanian Socialist Realists. Literary historian Ana Selejan describes him as one of the first Romanian authors of agitprop, and as such a pillar of "the new literary order." His early contributions include a stereotyped novella about communist strike actions, published by Contemporanul review in December 1947.

At around the same time, Călugăru also began working as an editor for Scînteia, the main PCR platform, while still writing for the pro-communist Contemporanul and Viața Românească. Perceived as an authority on ideological matters, he was one of the publicist employed by Editura Cartea Rusă, a state-run institution which exclusively published works of Russian and Soviet literature.

His works for the period include the short story collection Am dat ordin să tragă ("I Gave the Order to Fire", 1947), the plays Ion și Salomeia ("Ion and Salomeia", 1947) and Clovnul care gîndește ("The Thinking Clown", 1949), and the 1951 Oțel și pîine. The latter was based on extended visits into Transylvania region, where, beginning 1948, Călugăru had been sent to cover the erection and inauguration of Hunedoara Steel Foundry. Sponsored in part with money from the Literary Fund of the Writers' Union, Oțel și pîine earned Călugăru the annual State Prize, granted by the political and cultural leadership of the time to works seen as outstanding in ideological terms. By April 1952, the volume had also been included on a shortlist of recent communist literature, which became required reading for industrial workers at various locations in Romania, and the pretext for politically maneuvered "enlightenment" (lămurire) meetings between public and authors.

Ion Călugăru died in Bucharest only four years later, on May 22, 1956. His unpublished novellas and sketch stories were collected by his former unu colleague Sașa Pană, who released them under the title Casa șoarecilor ("House of Mice", 1958).

== Work ==
=== Early writings ===
According to Ovid Crohmălniceanu, Călugăru produced "the most substantial" literature among those interwar modernists who drew inspiration from observing isolated social environments. The peculiarities of his preferred settings are underlined by Călugăru's many references to Judaic religious practice, Jewish lore and the Hebrew Bible, in which critics have seen the backbone of Călugăru's originality within the realm of Romanian literature. Literary historian Henri Zalis, who comments on the books' mix of grotesque, comedic and tragic elements, also notes their ethnographic character: "The narrator composes a veritable spiritual census [...] of ceremonies—births, weddings, [...] Kol Nidre, Purim, Pesach and so on, that are perfectly distinguished. This initiative grants the author a first-rate role for whoever shall wish to find out how the Jews of these places were living decades ago, in most communities that were attractive in ethnographic, social and sacrificial terms, thereafter exposed to Antonescu-ordered extermination, and, during the repressive communist regime, to a massive uprooting." In several instances, these sources of inspiration were intertwined with influences form Romanian folklore and the oral traditions of his Moldavian birthplaces: several exegetes have argued that the various short stories published by Călugăru in the 1920s display the influence of Romania's classical storyteller Ion Creangă, while literary historian George Călinescu found them reminiscent of, but superior to, the writings of Bukovinian raconteur Emanoil Grigorovitza. According to Paul Cernat, both Călugăru and Fondane had participated in creating "a true cult" for Tudor Arghezi, who similarly mixed traditionalist and modernist influences, and who significantly affected their stylistic choices. While discussing Călugăru and Fondane's roots in Hasidic tradition, Cernat noted that both writers also moved toward "Expressionist écorchés" in either prose (Călugăru) or poetry (Fondane).

Caii lui Cibicioc, the first volume published by Ion Călugăru, was also the first of several works to focus on its author's rural background. Several of the stories, reminiscent of Creangă, are jocular accounts of childhood. They include the title work, which shows the youngsters Ițe and Șămă casually plotting to steal the eponymous horses. This stream is combined with more dramatic accounts, such as the piece in which Hakham Șmaia, unable to impose his paternal will, commits suicide. Călinescu also argued: "The most personal part in the literature of Ion Călugăru [...] is the one dealing with the Jewry of upper Moldavia. [...] In Caii lui Cibicioc and in Abecedar de povestiri populare the depiction is still shy or ruined by Surrealist methods. Still, even at this stage one will be struck by this strange, almost peasant-like, world, comprising forecarriage drivers, millers, porters, cabmen, water-carriers, shepherds, vagrant children, talkative old women." The same commentator added: "The hakhams, the synagogue janitors, the bath house attendants and the tailors do not manage to shatter the image of an autochthonous village. Only the candle lights visible inside houses [...], the old payot-wearing men on their way back from the synagogue, book in hand, everyone's allusions to biblical times, allow one's eyes to identify the distinct race."

Shortly after being published, the narratives were positively reviewed by Călugăru's mentors and Contimporanul colleagues Ion Vinea and Fondane, who found them compliant with their ideal of authenticity, and who praised their return to originality through the mechanisms of naïve art and primitivism. Vinea's review stated: "Ion Călugăru reties the thread leading all the way back to Creangă, and in such conditions as to exclude the accusation of mannerism and imitation." Călugăru's own pronouncements echoed this modern recovery of primitive tradition, seen as universal rather than local; in Integral's art manifesto and an article for Contimporanul, he defined tradition as: "the people's intelligence, freed from the eternal natural pastiche—and technology". He added: "The people's creations have known no dialect, but tended toward universality. Therefore: an African idol will resemble in subtlety a Romanian carving, as will a Romanian fairy tale resemble a Mongolian one."

=== The avant-garde years ===
While contributing to Integral, Ion Călugăru also began his relationship with experimental literature. The early products of this new preoccupation were prose fragments like Domnișoara Lot ("Miss Lot"), which used intertextuality, reworking themes borrowed from classical works of literature, in a manner also employed at the time by his colleague Jacques G. Costin. Like Vinea, Felix Aderca and Adrian Maniu, Călugăru was thought by some to be indebted to the early avant-garde figure Urmuz. This view was criticized by Călugăru's contemporary, modernist literary chronicler Perpessicius, who noted that all these authors had matured before Urmuz was even discovered by the literary establishment, and as such that they could not be considered Urmuz's pupils (an assessment described by Cernat as "singular, although somewhat amendable"). In contrast, Perpessicius' colleague Pompiliu Constantinescu included Călugăru among those modernists who incorporated Urmuz's brand of absurdism in works they wrote well into their careers. According to Cernat, Călugăru's texts, like those of his various colleagues, have assimilated the "Urmuz effect".

Călugăru's subsequent work in the novel genre was considered important, but less accomplished than his novellas, by literary chronicler Pericle Martinescu. With Paradisul statistic, Crohmălniceanu suggests, Călugăru was outlining a "cosmic and apocalyptic" vision indebted to "Expressionist aesthetics" and composed with "remarkable consistency and originality". In Crohmălniceanu's view, the book served to illustrate Călugăru's period with Contimporanul, and the influence of "Constructivism" as defined by Ion Vinea: like Vinea and Costin, Călugăru believed that objective prose was the object of journalism rather than literature, and, while his two colleagues explored parody, he opened his work to the grotesque. The same critic argued that, while the urban-themed novels were usually radically different in style when compared to the other half of Călugăru's 1930s writings, a crossover was still observable in Abecedar de povestiri populare, in Omul de după ușă, in Don Juan Cocoșatul and in Erdora—in the latter two, around the theme of "the ghetto condition". Such works introduce motifs related to social alienation, and were described by George Călinescu as "tiny biographies of the interior man", with a type of "sarcasm" that echoed the novels of Călugăru's modernist contemporary, Aderca. In Zalis' view, they speak of a "humanity that is hilariously dislocated", but are nonetheless distanced from pure avant-garde scenarios, since Călugăru masks any stylistic tension through "corrosiveness". Instead, Zalis suggests, he had acquired from his years as a leftist journalist the need to weigh events against the opinions of a focal character.

Charlie Blum, the protagonist of Omul de după ușă, investigates his actions with objectivity and sarcasm, trying to place his analytical self "behind the door". Frustrated in his attempt to find happiness with a rich American woman, he finds himself settled in a mediocre lifestyle. Henri Zalis argues that, beyond a Creangă-like narrative filter, Omul de după ușă contains Ion Călugăru's "hunger for fairy tales and pranks". Erdora and Monis are former lovers who reunite with each other, but who find themselves unable to exchange their middle-class life and for a rekindled passion. Călinescu assessed: "When he moves on to [writing about] the urban society, Ion Călugăru no longer maintains the same density of vision, being stalked about by that sort of cosmopolitanism than one notices in all Jews who are not tied down to a certain specificity. [...] Despite all that the writer is always valuable." Commenting on Erdora, he concluded: "Sarcasm barely covers the everyday ugliness, the thirst for great pathos. But such a theme requires more lyrical suaveness."

In Don Juan Cocoșatul, the hunchback hero, Pablo Ghligal, finds himself an object of female erotic and morbid curiosity, but is nevertheless marginalized socially. Călinescu found Don Juan Cocoșatul to be Călugăru's "moral autobiography", interpreting the hump as an allusion to the difficulties faced by Romanian Jews before and after emancipation. Contrarily, a rumor recorded by Vlaicu Bârna suggested that the true story at the basis of the book was a Teleorman landowner, known to Călugăru from the anecdotes told by Zaharia Stancu.

Through Ghilghal's sexual affairs, readers are introduced to a world of vice and opulence, where, Călinescu notes, people are "neurotic" and "sexual aberrations" omnipresent. This part of the book is also thought to include a portrait of Călugăru's former patron, Alexandru Bogdan-Pitești, under the guise of a lecherous aristocrat named Alexandru Lăpușneanu. The image this character projects is complex, as noted by Călinescu. The literary historian noted that Lăpușneanu blends in him: "the dignity in gossip, the boyar carriage, the refinement that the apparent vulgarity cannot bring to ruin, the blasé and cynical lechery". In Călinescu's view, the volume errs in not focusing more on such aspects, "but even as such some interior scenes are memorable". The category, he notes, includes the scuffle between cats and dogs inside the manorial estate, the visit paid by Lăpușneanu's scantly clad wife to a battlefield, and the comedy surrounding Lăpușneanu's confession to his priest.

=== Copilăria unui netrebnic ===
A similar mix of environments and styles is present in Copilăria unui netrebnic. The first of three semi-autobiographical novel tracing the early life of Călugăru's alter ego, Buiumaș, between his Dorohoi years and his life in Bucharest, it was followed by Trustul and Lumina primăverii. Călinescu found Copilăria... to be "of a perfect stylistic maturity", comparing the narrative to a "vast mural" with the chiaroscuro qualities of paintings by Rembrandt or Nicolae Grigorescu. The volume received more high praise from Ovid Crohmălniceanu, who, suggesting it constituted a Bildungsroman, also commented on its "extraordinary coherence", while Henri Zalis spoke of it as "excellent" and "stirring". Literary historian Nicolae Manolescu, who also recorded Copilăria...'s Bildungsroman quality, was more reserved when assessing its content and style, arguing that the protagonist's evolution is "uninteresting". He identified the sources of inspiration for the central narrative as being Creangă's celebrated autobiography, Childhood Memories, and the memoirs of Soviet author Maxim Gorky.

The book explored further Călugăru's connection to his Jewish Moldavian homeland, producing the personal history of an early 20th-century shtetl and tracing the biographies of its principal inhabitants. The result was described by Crohmălniceanu as "an actual monograph of humanity", depicted with "unusual sensory acuteness" and the "suaveness" of Marc Chagall's paintings, inviting readers into a universe at once "tough" and "bucolic". At the core, the same critic argued, was: "The osmosis between the autochthonous [Romanian] element and an age-old foreign [Jewish] tradition". The text makes heavy use of the picturesque in depicting scenes of Jewish life. Some such aspects relate specifically to the minute characteristics of Judaism as practiced in a provincial community: the yeshiva is disrupted by the intrusion of a cow, while synagogue life is interrupted by what George Călinescu refers to as "the tiny comedies of bigotry". The ritual itself is a source for wonder, as is the case with a common wedding, presented by the narrator as an alluring magic ritual. In one chapter, whose symbolism is seen by Călinescu as pointing to "the universality of faith", Mihalache, the local Christian tasked with supervising the burning candles after service in the temple, finds himself thrilled by the spectacle they offer, and marks a Sign of the Cross. The Shabbath ritual, Henri Zalis suggests, gives a respectable, mystical, air to what is a slow-moving and decadent, but "unique", shtetl community.

These are complemented by various anecdote-like episodes: the Romanian policeman makes a habit of frightening Jewish children; the beggar Moișă Lungu recounts macabre stories whereas the local Jewish women are fascinated by the short passage through the region of Romania's Queen. An episode, seen by Henri Zalis as reuniting the book's "ingenious characters" and "infantile mystique", shows the encounter between Buiumaș and a rabbi at a lively county fair. Such details, Crohmălniceanu notes, are completed by Călugăru's recourse to linguistic resourcefulness in authentically rendering his characters' speech patterns: an accumulation of proverbs, idiotisms and execrations, sourced from a common oral culture and together reflecting "a bitter life experience". Samples of this include sarcastic references to children as "rats", or useless consumers of food, the expressions of "aggressive pride" on the part of paupers surviving on alms, and curses which suppose "imaginative power" ("may your mouth move into your ear", "may your copulation last only as long as it takes steam to leave the mouth" etc.). Buiumaș's vindictive mother Țipra is herself a source for these quasi-ritual gestures: when her daughter Blima crosses her, she decides to cut her away from the family, and refuses to ever again mention her son-in-law by name. Buiumaș himself braves a similar treatment when he asks to be enlisted in a non-Jewish school. An old woman encourages Țipra to vehemently oppose his wish, suggesting that popular education is a vehicle for Christian proselytism and Jewish assimilation: "tie [Buiumaș] up, or else he'll grow up into a ne'er-do-well who will go as far to baptize himself, so as to become an officer. This is how they all are, those who wear uniforms in high school; they all turn into officers. [...] You'll be seeing him running to church with a candle in hand, or riding a horse, ordering our children to be slaughtered."

The public's tendency of defining Călugăru, and his contemporary I. Peltz as novelists prone to illustrating Jewish specificity was already manifesting itself in the period after the novel saw print. Although an admirer of both Călugăru and Peltz, Mihail Sebastian was alarmed by this trend, and feared that his own novels, which focused on more existential themes, would be ascribed to the same category. Reviewing Copilăria unui netrebnic's "ethnographic aspects", and judging them to be "often remarkable", Manolescu added: "Unfortunately, Ion Călugăru does not know how to extract from the specificity of the race and location that human universality that we find in genius writers like Joseph Roth or Bashevis-Singer."

The timelessness of shtetl society contrasts with episodes which introduce history in the form of major upheavals: the 1907 Romanian Peasants' Revolt manages to disrupt the entire town; World War I and the Romanian campaign, with the arrival of foreign intervention forces, fascinate the locals; and, ultimately, the effect of the Russian Revolution gives rise to an alternative political voice. The latter event marks an important step in the spiritual evolution of Buiumaș, who, like the author himself, is a supporter of proletarian revolution, and, according to Crohmălniceanu, expresses this by showing sympathy toward Moișă Lungu or other "déclassé figures with rebellious impulses". The promise of revolution, coinciding with the protagonist's adolescence, is weaved into a narrative suggesting the growth of radical ideals, their progressive adoption by common individuals. Another hypothetical aspect of the book's politics was advanced by Zalis, who suggested that it outlines the strategies of survival of interwar Jews braving antisemitism.

The stories and novellas comprised in De la cinci până la cinci also drew attention for their portrayal of socialist rebelliousness and their overall advocacy of leftist values. According to Pericle Martinescu, these works "revive" the Romanian novella genre, reconnecting it with its sources and evidencing a storyteller of "accomplished talent". Luceafărul morții ("Death's Evening Star") shows the conflict between a beggar father and his prosperous son, in terms which evoke class conflict. Paltoane și nimic altceva ("Overcoats and Nothing Else"), in which Crohmălniceanu identifies the influence of Soviet author Isaak Babel, is set to the background of the Russian Civil War. Another such prose work from the period focused on the communist-led Grivița Strike of 1933. The short story Pane, dă-mi fata! ("Master, Give Me the Girl!") was, together with Alexandru Sahia's Șomaj fără rasă ("Unemployment Regardless of Race"), one of only two such pieces ever to be published by the pro-communist Era Nouă, which also recommended Copilăria unui netrebnic, together with works by George Mihail Zamfirescu and Stoian Gh. Tudor, as one of the positive examples in Romania's emerging Social Realism.

=== Călugăru and Socialist Realism ===
Ion Călugăru's ultimate affiliation with Socialist Realism was widely interpreted as having produced the weakest section of his work. This critical interpretation was espoused even before the end of communism, during a period of liberalization and aesthetic reevaluation. In this context, Crohmălniceanu argued that Călugăru's late works "no longer explore, to their disadvantage, [the] precious lode in Ion Călugăru's literature." This is also noted by historian Lucian Boia, who writes: "To be a leftist used to signify nonconformity; now, quite contrarily, to be a leftist is to show conformism." Moreover, Boia writes, there was "no longer anything specifically Jewish" in Călugăru's attitudes.

Other authors have retrospectively questioned Călugăru's overall value, taking in view his political status. According to historian and novelist Ioan Lăcustă, Călugăru owed his promotion "not so much to his literary talent, but to the fact that he had rushed in, like many other intellectuals, writers, artists etc., to support and popularize the new regime's accomplishments." Writing in 2006, Nicolae Manolescu opined: "Nobody speaks today of Ion Călugăru [...], who was considered a promise during the 1930s. [...] Călugăru's literature was overvalued after 1948 not least of all because of [his] communist sympathies". He dismissed Oțel și pîine as "mere realist-socialist pulp", and defined Copilăria... as Călugăru's "one legible work". Henri Zalis commented on the mutation of Călugăru's "playful" spirit into "diffuse proletkult", and suggested that the writer may have thus been seduced by the idea of revenging his own persecution by wartime antisemites. Oțel și pîine, Zalis thought, was a "rudimentary appendix to forceful industrialization".

Literary critic Iulia Popovici described the novel as propaganda to legitimize "the socialist present", also noting that it was the only such work in which the two dominant themes, "constructing socialism in the village" and "constructing socialism in the city", overlapped. Literary historian Ion Simuț analyzed the various echoes of Călugăru's work in the communist media of his day, and concluded that these make him part of a "second circle" of writers accepted by the Socialist Realist establishment, on the same level of approval as Mihai Beniuc, Geo Bogza, Cezar Petrescu, and Alexandru Toma, but ranking below Tudor Arghezi, Mihail Sadoveanu, or Camil Petrescu. Călugăru himself sparked posthumous controversy for participating in communist-orchestrated attacks on the work and reputation of authors without ideological credentials. In one such situation, he argued that Liviu Rebreanu "was no genius, and his books are far from reaching the value of those by [Soviet author] Mikhail Sholokhov"—a claim retrospectively described by Al. Săndulescu as "an enormity" in terms of "servility and philosovietism".

The author's participation in Socialist Realism nevertheless came with a measure of conflict between Călugăru and other members of the new literary establishment. In the late 1940s, the writer kept a private diary, which documents his trips to Hunedoara and shows his skepticism about some aspects of communist politics. Documenting the dire social conditions of this time, Călugăru's text includes detail on such aspects as the conspiratorial infiltration of Social Democratic opposition centers by PCR operatives, the party's close surveillance of factory workers, and Călugăru's own questions about "labels" such as the regime's self-designation as a "dictatorship of the proletariat" or about the show trials of "saboteurs". The author also confesses his dislike for hypocrisy in official discourse and the press, commenting on the "girlish sincerity" of dispatches from the Soviet Union, the PCR's tiny membership in 1944, on the "voluntary work" demanded by communist leaders and its transformation into a "corvée", and on intellectuals "who say something other than what they think." Later notes further record the decline of his enthusiasm. Expressing fears that he was being tricked by more senior communists, Călugăru accused his Scînteia colleagues (Silviu Brucan, Traian Șelmaru, Sorin Toma) of not publishing his contributions so that they could later attack him for a displaying lack of motivation. The jaded author came to express a private wish of blocking out the world of politics and dedicating his entire energy to the creative process.

In 1952, Călugăru's name was cited by official novelist and critic Petru Dumitriu among those of first-generation Socialist Realists who had not shown themselves to be productive enough, and who had isolated themselves from the proletariat. Before that time, Oțel și pîine was being recommended as a major accomplishment of the new literary school, in articles by Socialist Realist critics such as Sami Damian or Mihai Novicov. Late in 1951, Dumitriu himself had publicly pledged to follow up on Călugăru's example and write the second-ever Romanian book to deal "with the basic sector in our economy, heavy industry." In 1953, as the Romanian literary scene reoriented itself in accordance with the guidelines suggested by Soviet politico Georgy Malenkov, the same book was officially criticized, on the behalf of the Romanian Writers' Union, by author Eugen Frunză. Frunză's official report, formed around Malenkov's theories about literary types and naturalness in Socialist Realist literature, argued: "The reader of Ion Călugăru's book Oțel și pîine was for sure able to note that the author is able to individualize certain negative characters. In contrast, the reader will encounter in the same book some six Central Committee activists, who are nothing other than diagrams, not in any way distinguished one from the other". Similar criticism had been voiced a year earlier by communist politician and literary chronicler George Macovescu, in reference to Călugăru's contributions in the reportage genre, particularly his initial piece on the Hunedoara Steel Foundry. In Macovescu's opinion, the text "is not a reportage, but an article not yet woven, or a fragment from a report not so well researched."

=== Casa șoarecilor ===
The Casa șoarecilor pieces, which are the last stories ever published under Ion Călugăru's name, do not comply with the Socialist Realist canon. The volume's first section, titled Schițe fără umor ("Humorless Sketches"), comprise literary portraits and musings. Critic Simona Vasilache notes that such fragments revolve around the author's subjective perception of the world: "Not all the phrases make sense, not all the scenes have depth, that being because Călugăru's search is not one for clarity but, quite the contrary, for the vapor. The sensation of memory, more precious than the reasoned test of memory." The volume, she notes, comprises elements from all the stages in Călugăru's early career, from "the lyrical exercises of youth" to "lively dialogues, written with good craftsmanship". The stories mark a return to Călugăru's preoccupation with rural and suburban life. They introduce characters who live meager existence on the margin of society, such as the Tatar Mahmud, hanged on cherry tree, and the philosophical Jewish salesman Șmelche. One piece, believed by Vasilache to echo the sketches of Romania's 19th century classic Ion Luca Caragiale, shows a female shopkeeper on the night of her husband's death, struggling between closing the establishment to mark his death or keeping it open to pay for his funeral. Other fragments resurrect Buiumaș and some other protagonists of Copilăria.... The eponymous story begins with the boy and his mother inquiring about a possible inheritance from a relative in Japan, and culminates in describing the hypnotic effect of mice swarming around the local post office. One other short narrative shows Buiumaș lecturing his playmates about justice and sin, described by Vasilache as a strange outcome: "A child would have found any other means. That is why the sketches' endings are puzzling, depicting, with stinginess in words and even more stinginess in deeds, a world that is no longer itself."

The second half of Casa șoarecilor comprises novellas such as Sfințenia lui Veniamin Jidovul ("The Holiness of Veniamin the Jew")—described by Vasilache as "a vanitas vanitatum just as hasty, just as cruel as is the world of [Schițe fără umor], with barbaric shindigs, indifferent to death, living through the pointless momentary torments." These stories rely heavily on documenting the person's imaginary universe, as is the case with Firi neînțelese ("Misunderstood Characters") and Conflictul meu cu Portugalia ("My Conflict with Portugal"). Vasilache notes: "These are merely projected ideas, grouped together by a not so tightly knit web of a narrative. [...] Random matches, over which blows an avant-garde wind."

== Legacy ==
Ion Călugăru's Socialist Realist work, like other writings by his peers, fell out of favor in the 1970s and '80s: Nicolae Ceaușescu's national communist leadership entirely discarded earlier expressions of socialist literature, and removed most of them from the national curriculum. Călugăru's books of the 1950s were reevaluated critically especially following the Romanian Revolution of 1989, with which came the end of Romania's communist period. The 1995 Dicționarul scriitorilor români ("Romanian Writers' Dictionary"), edited by Mircea Zaciu, Marian Papahagi and Aurel Sasu, noted: "[Ion Călugăru] had engaged himself, with short-term profits, but failure in the long run, into an intervention against nature and [...] against the nature of art, but also against his own nature: abruptly moving from eroticism to heroism, he was not recommended for such an enterprise by either his native temperament, his collected life experience, and his artistic means. Together with the other relics of proletkult, Oțel și pîine is presently interesting at most as a symptomatic study case for an as yet virtual sociology of literature." Lăcustă also noted: "After four and a half decades, [Oțel și pîine] can perhaps only be read as a literary document of its epoch." In contrast, others have defended the interwar Călugăru as a writer of talent. This is the case of Simuț, who notes that Călugăru, like his Jewish cogenerationists Ury Benador and I. Peretz, is one of the "interesting" details "worthy of an honest literary history." Henri Zalis, who took charge of a project to reedit Călugăru's early writings as part of a larger project involving interwar Jewish contributions, complained in 2004 that there was a real danger that writers from Călugăru to Felix Aderca, Sergiu Dan and Alexandru Jar would be forgotten by the public, "pulverized" by literary historians, their work "degraded by antisemitic hawking".

During the Ceaușescu years, Călugăru's rival Dumitriu also parted with Socialist Realism and began writing more unconventional stories. Literary historian Ion Vartic, who proposes that Dumitriu built his new career on plagiarism, notes that many of his short stories and novels incorporated real-life stories told by his elder Ion Vinea. Vartic concludes that one such short piece, published by Dumitriu under the title Cafiné, is an "erotic farce" played on Ion Călugăru at some point during the interwar period.

Mentions of Călugăru's life are also present in Mircea Eliade's Autobiography, written during Eliade's self-exile and teaching career at the University of Chicago. Eliade notably describes his meeting with the Cuvântul journalist, recalling his surprise that Călugăru's everyday vocabulary seemed to be quoting avant-garde stories by Urmuz or Sașa Pană. Recalling her 1971 meeting with Eliade on American soil, Romanian poet Constanța Buzea wrote: "[Eliade] asks if Ion Călugăru has an echo among us, today. Upon being told that this isn't the case, he turns grim. He says he regrets, he never knew, he could not predict that, in one way or another, sooner or later, one's mistakes are paid with the others' indifference and silence..."

Călugăru's texts affected the visual experiments of his friend M. H. Maxy. During their time at Integral, Maxy illustrated with sketch-commentaries several of Călugăru's prose fragments, including Domnișoara Lot. A collector's edition of Paradisul statistic, kept by the Brăila city museum, features collage work by the same artist.
