= Henriette Yvonne Stahl =

Romanian writer and translator

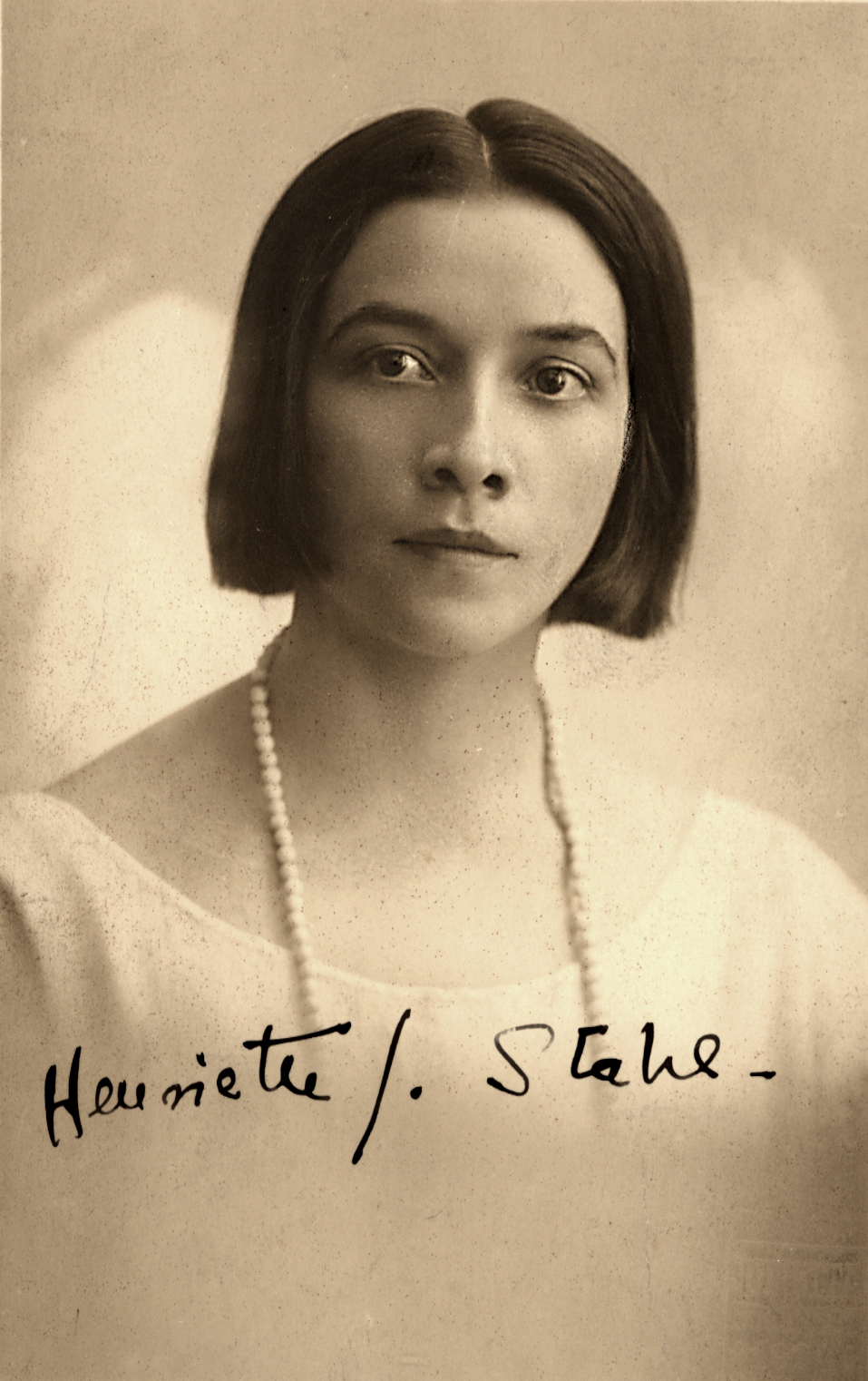
Henriette Yvonne Stahl. Autographed postcard

Henriette Yvonne Stahl (January 9, 1900 – May 25/26, 1984) was a Romanian novelist, short story writer and translator.

== Biography ==
Born in Sankt Avold, Alsace-Lorraine, in the German Empire (now Saint-Avold in the Moselle department of France), she was illegitimate until her parents' marriage in February 1901. Her mother was Blanche Boueve; her father Henri Stahl, a professor and minor writer, was the son of a Bavarian naturalized citizen of Romania. Her brother was the sociologist and ethnographer Henri H. Stahl. She took private lessons in lieu of attending high school, following which Stahl studied at the Dramatic Arts Conservatory in Bucharest from 1921 to 1925. Her first published work was the short novel Voica, which appeared in Viața Românească in 1924 and was received with enthusiasm by Garabet Ibrăileanu (the magazine's own editor), who proposed it for the Romanian Writers' Society prize.

Her first book was also Voica (1929), followed by the 1931 short story collection Mătușa Matilda. She then wrote a series of psychological novels: Steaua robilor (1934), Între zi și noapte (1942), Marea bucurie (1946) and Fratele meu omul (1965). Near the end of her writing career, Stahl returned to short stories, several of which surpassed the quality of some of her novels, and were collected as Nu mă călca pe umbră (1969). Perfectly fluent in French, she translated a number of her novels into the language and published them in France, meeting with considerable success. She wrote the novel Le Temoin de l'Eternité (1975) directly in French; a Romanian edition appeared in 1995. Her translations into Romanian were Eugène Sue's Mysteries of Paris; Emily Brontë's Wuthering Heights (1959); John Galsworthy's Forsyte Saga (1958-1961, four volumes); Rabindranath Tagore's Gora (1965); Murasaki Shikibu's Tale of Genji (1969) and, in collaboration, several plays by Ivan Turgenev (1958). In 1981, she was awarded the Romanian Writers' Union special prize. By and large, critics did not place Stahl at the forefront of Romanian prose writers. George Călinescu accused her of an "exaggerated feminism", and while recognizing that several characters rang true, believed this insufficient to cover her deficiencies. In Istoria literaturii române, Ion Negoițescu was enthusiastic about two novels, but kept silent about the rest.

Stahl was romantically involved with two fellow writers, Ion Vinea and Petru Dumitriu. After the latter fled Communist Romania, she was arrested, interrogated and detained for a year, threatened with a charge of high treason after admitting she knew of his plans.
