= Cuvântul Liber (1924) =

Romanian periodical

Cuvântul Liber (Romanian for "The Free Word") was a Romanian political and cultural weekly published by Eugen Filotti from 1924 to 1925 and by Tudor Teodorescu-Braniște from 1933 to 1936. Writers such as Ion Barbu, Victor Eftimiu, and Tudor Arghezi or musicians, such as George Enescu or film critics such as the publisher's brother Mircea Filotti were among the contributors.
