= Petru Dumitriu =

Romanian writer (1924–2002)

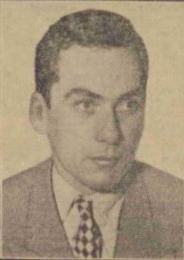
- Born: 8 May 1924; Baziaș, Caraș-Severin County, Kingdom of Romania
- Died: 6 April 2002 (aged 77); Metz, France
- Occupation: novelist
- Writing career
- Period: 1943–2002

Petru Dumitriu (Romanian pronunciation: [ˈpetru dumiˈtri.u]; 8 May 1924 – 6 April 2002) was a Romanian-born novelist who wrote both in Romanian and in French.

== Biography ==
Dumitriu was born in Baziaș, in the Banat region of Romania. His father was a Romanian army officer and his mother was Hungarian and spoke to her husband and son mostly in French, so that French was Petru Dumitriu's second language from childhood. After school in Romania, Dumitriu studied philosophy at the Ludwig-Maximilians-Universität München with a Humboldt scholarship, but his studies were interrupted in 1944 when Romania changed sides in the Second World War.

After becoming a member of the Romanian Writers' Union committee in 1950, he became editor-in-chief at Viața Românească in 1953.

In 1960, Dumitriu fled from Romania to West Berlin, moved to Frankfurt am Main and later to Bad Godesberg, Germany, and finally settling in Metz, France. He did not return to Romania until 1996.

He was married twice: with Henriette Yvonne Stahl, a French-born Romanian writer 24 years his senior, in 1956 (they divorced after about one week), and the same year with Irina Medrea (divorced in 1988).

He had two daughters: Irene (born 1959) and Helene (born 1961)

== Works ==
Partial list of publications:

- Bijuterii de familie, ESPLA, 1949; English translation by Edward Hyams, Family Jewels, Collins, 1961
- Drum fără pulbere (Road without dust), ESPLA, 1951
- Cronică de la câmpie (Chronicle of the plain), ESPLA, 1955
- Pasărea furtunii (Storm Bird), ESPLA, 1957
- Cronica de familie (Family Chronicle), ESPLA, 1957 (chapter filmed as An Unforgettable Summer)
- Incognito, Seuil, 1962; English translation by Norman Denny, Collins, 1964
- L'Extreme Occident (The Far West), Seuil, 1964
- Le sourire sarde (The Sardinian Smile), Seuil, 1967
- L'homme aux yeux gris (The man with grey eyes), Seuil, 1968
- Rendez-vous au jugement dernier, Seuil, 1961; English translation by Richard Howard, Meeting at the last judgment, Pantheon, 1962
- Au dieu inconnu. Confessio (To the unknown god. Confession), Seuil, 1979

(ESPLA: Editura de Stat pentru Literatură si Arta, [Romanian] State Publishing House for Literature and Art, Bucharest)
