= Sandu Tudor =

Romanian poet, journalist, theologian and Orthodox monk (1896 - 1962)

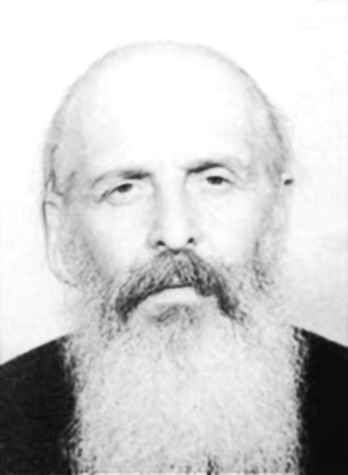
- Tudor's Securitate file photograph
- Born: Alexandru Al. Teodorescu; December 22/24, 1896; Bucharest, Kingdom of Romania
- Died: November 17, 1962 (aged 65); Aiud Prison, Romanian People's Republic
- Other names: Brother Agathon; Fr. Daniil Teodorescu
- Occupations: Priest; poet; journalist; soldier; sailor
- Theological work
- Language: Romanian
- Tradition or movement: Eastern Orthodox theology (Romanian Orthodoxy)
- Main interests: Hesychasm

Signature
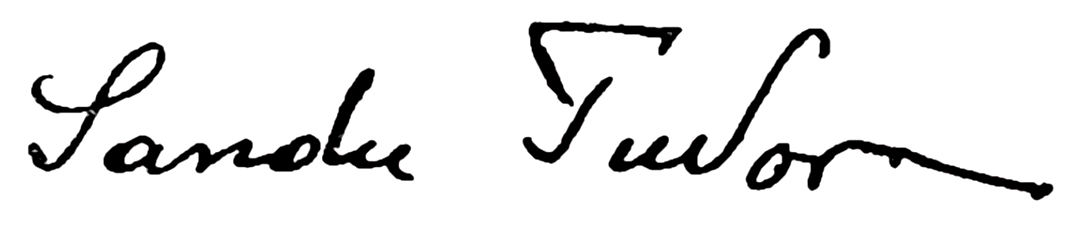

Sandu Tudor (Romanian pronunciation: [ˈsandu ˈtudor]; born Alexandru Al. Teodorescu, known in church records as Brother Agathon, later Daniil Teodorescu, Daniil Sandu Tudor, Daniil de la Rarău; December 22 or December 24, 1896 – November 17, 1962) was a Romanian poet, journalist, theologian and Orthodox monk. Having had an adventurous youth, he first became known in the late 1920s, when he contributed to the modern Orthodox revival, rallying with the journal Gândirea. Although a traditionalist and a critic of materialism, he was closely associated with the modernist scene, and generally supported left-wing causes. Tudor was also a scandal-prone journalist and newspaper owner, who faced accusations of slander and was avoided by his peers.

From 1927, when he wrote his first akathist, Tudor made overtures toward Orthodox monasticism. Demanding universal metanoia, seeking to strengthen Eastern hesychasm, he joined other mystics and writers in creating the "Burning Bush" religious movement, and took orders in 1948. He was soon branded an enemy of the Romanian communist regime, and twice arrested for supposed political crimes. Tudor died at Aiud Prison, a victim of torture and criminal neglect. His body was never recovered.

Sandu Tudor is generally considered an unaccomplished writer, although his fusion of modernism and traditionalism has drawn critical interest. He enjoys a sizable following in the field of Orthodox theology, and, after the fall of communism, has been considered for canonization.

== Biography ==
=== Early life and career ===
The future Sandu Tudor was born Alexandru Teodorescu in the Romanian capital, Bucharest. His birthday, as recorded in reference works, is December 24, 1896, even though he himself gave it as December 22, 1896 (1886 in some sources). He had many siblings, including a brother who became a painter. Their father, also Alexandru, was a judge, who earned a modest income. Their mother was a Sofia Teodorescu.

Tudor had a troubled and adventurous youth. He graduated high school in Ploiești city, where his history teacher gave him his first lessons in Christian philosophy. In 1916, as he was about to complete his secondary education, Romania entered World War I. Tudor was drafted into the Romanian Land Forces, fought in the defensive war of 1917, and reached the rank of Sub-Officer; he was eventually demobilized in 1921.

An aspiring painter, Tudor made his way back to Bucharest, and enlisted at the Academy of Arts. He lacked the means to support himself, interrupted his studies, and traveled to the Black Sea port of Constanța, to live with his family. He then qualified as a seafaring officer, employed by the Romanian Merchant Fleet between 1922 and 1924. Tudor alternated these assignments with work in education, and was a substitute teacher at the high school in Pogoanele town.

Once he decided to begin a fifth career, in journalism, Tudor returned to Bucharest. He had acquired a passion for book collecting: he is said to have gathered over 8,000 volumes in one place, making his one of the largest collections in Bucharest. He married and divorced three times, but did not have any children.

=== The Christian Futurist ===
Tudor's literary work and worldview were already assuming a Christian Orthodox and neo-traditionalist ethos. He soon rallied with the mystical Orthodox ("Orthodoxist") circles, whose informal leader was poet-theologian Nichifor Crainic. Beginning 1924, Tudor was among the writers affiliated with Gândirea literary magazine, helping Crainic to divert that publication from its modernist and secular agenda. After moving back to Bucharest, Tudor headed the Welfare department of the Association of Christian Students, publishing his first poetry collection, Comornic ("Cellar", or "Cellar-Keeper"), in 1925. It received a poor review from critic George Călinescu, who described Tudor's style as "baroque" and "superficial". According to Călinescu, Tudor imitated the art of pre-Orthodoxists D. Teleor and Mateiu Caragiale, without blossoming into a "real writer."

Tudor's other contributions as a poet and literary theorist were in the extreme of Romanian modernism, and hosted by the avant-garde journal Contimporanul. They include the February 1927 essay Logica absurdului ("The Logic of the Absurd"). According to literary historian Adrian Marino, it should be read as a "nihilistic" text, echoing the irrationalism of Dada and Futurism. In March, he contributed the Contimporanul editorial, a polemical text about the impact of cultural modernity. Researcher Paul Cernat sees in it a sample of "rather Futurist" Orthodoxism, noting its attack on the "supersexual" content and "gallantry" of minor modernism, as well as its praise of purity in high modernism. Taking its references from the modern spirituality espoused by Sâr Péladan, John Ruskin, and Jean Cocteau, the article postulated an essential conflict in modern art, between the "Sons of suicide" and "the warrior Art of immortality".

Tudor's other contributions at Contimporanul were short poems, heavily influenced by Futurism and Expressionism, but structured around apocalyptic Orthodoxist visions. As Cernat notes, Tudor the poet surprised critics with his "organic" assimilation of modern "purism", while his Gândirea roots were still on display.

With his synthesis of literary nihilism and Orthodox devotion, Tudor found himself at odds with the modernists' hero, poet-journalist Tudor Arghezi. In Contimporanul, Tudor had hinted that Arghezi's "pseudo-avant-garde" poetry was vulgar and hedonistic. Arghezi, a defrocked monk, wrote to inform Tudor that he could see no profound link between Orthodoxy and the Romanian psyche. As Arghezi had it, modernized Orthodoxism was only kidding itself by assuming the contrary. Tudor's comments in Contimporanul showed that the magazine staff was withdrawing from the revolutionary wing of Romanian modernism. Its conservative stance alarmed the radicals at unu magazine. They soon nominated Tudor as one of the authors who were sabotaging the whole modernist school.

Around 1928, Tudor was in contact with the young religious scholar Mircea Eliade, who was becoming an exponent of experimental neo-traditionalism in Romanian philosophy. Both were influenced by Nae Ionescu, the theologian and logician, theorist of an eclectic ideology known as Trăirism. Looking back on that period in his 1980s memoirs, Eliade wrote: "I met often with Stelian Mateescu, Paul Sterian, Mircea Vulcănescu, and Sandu Tudor. Together we planned a journal of religious philosophy, for which Tudor had found a title: Duh și Slovă (Spirit and Letter)." The magazine, described by Eliade as a would-be successor of Ionescu's mystical journal Logos, never saw print.

=== Dissident Orthodoxism ===
For his part, Tudor still defied classification. According to Cernat, he should be read as more of a "church-goer", facade, writer than a "religious" poet. In a November 1928 interview for the journal Tiparnița Literară, Tudor was very critical of the militant Orthodoxist circles. In Tudor's view, Romania's Orthodox literati could find themselves duped by "a spirituality of the Dark one, very similar to that of Christ". He proposed that the religious revival needed to focus on "vigorous and harsh penance", with "the signs of a true confession". With Vulcănescu and Gheorghe Racoveanu, Tudor wrote the polemical tract Infailibilitatea Bisericii și failibilitatea sinodală ("Church Infallibility and Synodal Fallibility"), published on the front pages of Nae Ionescu's daily, Cuvântul (January 22, 1929). It presented arguments in favor of raising sacred tradition over the Romanian Synod's authority, and therefore in support of Ionescu's dissident stance on the computation of Easter (which the Synod affixed to March 31). In later articles for the same paper, Tudor challenged Church politics to the point of arguing that the Synod was schismatic.

Reportedly, Sandu Tudor never managed to earn respect the principal Trăirist figures. According to the Trăirist writer Mihail Sebastian, Nae Ionescu regarded Tudor as an amusement; moreover, others in the press simply felt that Tudor was a "cretinous journalist". An even more virulent critic was the maverick Gândirea editor and left-leaning Trăirist Petre Pandrea, who contends that Tudor was notorious as a blackmailer. Pandrea and Tudor first clashed around 1928, shortly after Pandrea published his White Lily Manifesto of the revolutionary youth. Tudor criticized the document in his articles for Contimporanul.

In 1932, however, the young art critic and political thinker Petru Comarnescu wrote that Tudor, Sterian, Vulcănescu, and Petru Manoliu were four of the leading Orthodoxist Trăirists (or, as he called them, "Experiencialists"). For his part, Vulcănescu recognized such a categorization, but noted that Gândirea's Orthodoxism was rather antiquated by the standards of "our generation". In his view, Tudor was one of the few men who could fit in with both Crainic's old Orthodoxists and the Nae Ionescu faction.

In this context, Crainic co-opted Tudor and Eliade on his Gândirea editorial staff. The other new arrivals, reinforcing the magazine's traditionalist editorial policy, were Pandrea, Zaharia Stancu, G. Breazul, Dragoș Protopopescu, Vintilă Ciocâlteu, and Sorin Pavel. While this reshuffling took place, Tudor consolidated his reputation as a mystic. His passion for the Orthodox tradition was voiced in his first religious hymn (or akathist), honoring Saint Dimitrie Basarabov, published by Gândirea in 1927, and collected in a 1940 volume. Described as a "superb" piece by theologian Marius Vasileanu, it earned Tudor blessings from the Synod. Sterian, who announced that, thanks in part to Tudor, Romanian poetry had entered its age of "religious glory", was directly inspired to write his own Akathist to the Venerable Mother Parascheva the New.

Literary critics were less impressed. The immediate reactions to the reinvention of akathist verse ranged from the positive (literary columnist Perpessicius) to the derisive (author Alexandru Sahia). According to comparatist Geo Vasile, Sandu Tudor's hymn is typical of "minor, mimetic, illustrative poetry", strictly in the vein of Gândirea traditionalism. Philologist Elivira Sorohan summarizes critical consensus: Sandu Tudor was a "sub-mediocre poet".

=== Athonite pilgrimage and Floarea de Foc ===
Shortly after receiving the Synod's accolades, Tudor left on pilgrimage to Mount Athos, the Orthodox sacred site. In effect, his journey had a mundane subtext: the Romanian writer wanted to testify on the negative aspects of Athonite monasticism. For some eight months, he was allowed to follow around, and imitate, a whirling monk who was held in high esteem by the Athonite clergy. Vasileanu suggests that Tudor "was in a position to witness the true face of Orthodox Christianity and uncover secret bits from the prayer of the heart." Tudor detailed his experience in travel notes that were published by Gândirea. As Tudor writes (to Călinescu's amusement), his was a serendipitous or divinely-inspired journey, with tiny miracles occurring throughout.

In early 1930, Tudor was involved in a debate about modernist theater, part of a "defense team" for the Expressionist Vilna Troupe. With fellow writer Ilarie Voronca and artist M. H. Maxy, he supported the Vilna actors and their mentor, Jacob Sternberg, for having broken up with old-school drama, even when their "lugubrious" productions had scandalized the Romanian public.

Tudor's own journalistic venture was the political and literary magazine Floarea de Foc ("Fire Flower"), published sporadically (1932, 1933, 1936), and having for collaborators some of the leading Trăirists, modernists or political radicals: Eliade, Manoliu, Sterian, Emil Cioran, Eugène Ionesco, Arșavir Acterian, Haig Acterian, Dan Botta, Ovidiu Papadima, Camil Petrescu, Henri H. Stahl, Horia Stamatu, and Octav Șuluțiu. The art manifesto, signed by Tudor himself, proclaimed the need for a "nurturing word", "clean thinking", and obedience to "the Redeemer". As Sorohan argues, the text covered its "lack of ideas" with "exultation", with Tudor displaying his "bewilderingly impoverished vocabulary."

Sorohan divides Floarea de Foc into quality articles (those by Cioran, Eliade, Ionesco, Stahl etc.) and Tudor's "Prolegomenos" column, an "insufferable rigmarole". Another controversial aspect is Floarea de Foc's opposition to the established school of cultural criticism: a Manoliu essay (called "ridiculous" by Sorohan) posthumously attacked literary theorist Titu Maiorescu as a manipulator of the reading public. Maiorescu's modernist disciple, Eugen Lovinescu, was also scolded by Floarea de Foc, in what Sorohan calls a "disgusting" piece, written by one whose name "is forever buried in the pages of that magazine".

More famously, Ionesco used the magazine for his polemical pieces targeting the contemporary literary scene and the mainstream of modernism, with a stern defense of authenticity—short essays which were collected in his volume No!. Tudor, meanwhile, was attacking the backbone of Romanian modernism. His art chronicles chided modernist artists Marcel Janco and Olga Greceanu. According to Tudor, contemporary artworks were "inhuman", and modernism itself looked doomed. This critique had less to do with Orthodox conservatism, and more with left-wing anti-capitalism—as noted by art critic Mihai Rădulescu, Tudor was going through a "leftist drift". In 1932, Floarea de Foc acted as a platform for young communists to explain their revolutionary ideals.

By 1933, Tudor was also putting out a political newspaper, Credința ("The Faith"). Eliade was again in contact with him, but was critical of Tudor's shadier dealings: Credința, he writes, was secretly funded by an anonymous magnate, surviving on "political circumstances" and on "scandals", with Tudor's own columns being "aggressively moralistic". Eliade claims that he himself only agreed to work with Tudor after the latter insisted; he published his subsequent articles under a pseudonym, Ion Plăeșu, explaining that he was thus bypassing the exclusivity rights of Ionescu's Cuvântul.

Although declaring itself neutral in the ideological debate, Tudor's newspaper soon acquired a left-leaning staff: Manoliu, Zaharia Stancu, Eugen Jebeleanu. According to Eliade, they were only employed by Tudor when he realized that Cuvântul men would not join him on the "cheap tabloid". The collaboration between Tudor and his leftist friends was also taken to the field of literature. In 1934, Stancu hosted samples of Tudor's poetry in his Antologia poeților tineri ("Young Poets Anthology"). Cartoonist Neagu Rădulescu, who joined the group at this time, recalls that Tudor, striking the figure of a "Church martyr", was a literary sponsor of the "writing republic".

=== Anti-fascism ===
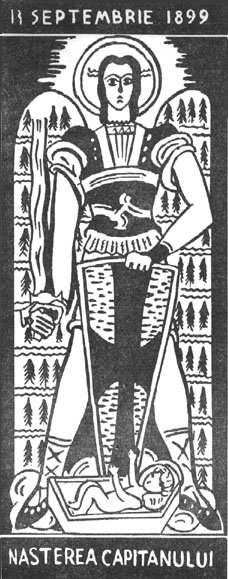
Alexandru Bassarab's Nașterea ("Birth"), engraving inspired by the Iron Guard version of Orthodoxism. The Archangel Michael watching over the crib of future Guard leader Corneliu Zelea Codreanu

During that interval, Nae Ionescu and his Cuvântul were moving to the far right, aligning themselves with the fascist Iron Guard. Enlisted in 1932 with the more moderate National Agrarian Party, Tudor criticized the Trăirists' sympathy for radical solutions, either fascist or communist, defending Romania's young democracy. In a December 1933 issue of Credința, he reacted: "We say that democracy is not the good thing for us, yet we have never even truly implemented it". Writing from a Christian perspective, Tudor accused Romania's revolutionary youth of "monkeying" foreign experiments in totalitarianism, describing Adolf Hitler as the Antichrist, and equating all revolutionary ideologies with the triumph of "animality". Tudor and Eliade were among the 31 Christian and Jewish Romanian intellectuals to have signed a protest against antisemitism in general and against Nazism in particular. Their appeal to ventilate Romania's "medieval atmosphere" was hotly condemned by the pro-Nazi Axa magazine.

Also in December 1933, Credința hosted a plea in favor of anti-fascist political activism. Signed by Stahl, the opinion piece proposed that political involvement was a civic duty, citing fascism as the enemy of freedom, and also implying that "Bolshevik" communism was "left-wing fascism". Eliade supported that stance, in the name of non-racial "Romanianism", noting that both political extremes advanced "a dictatorship of the brute, of the imbecile, of the incompetent." Also in Credința, philosopher Constantin Noica spoke out against the advocates of cultural isolation and nativism. His articles of 1933 and 1934 noted that Romanian culture was eminently parochial, and openly criticized Gândirea traditionalism. Noica also rejected the political ambitions of his generation colleagues. During the 1933 election, he recommended passive resistance and abstention, rather than ideological combat, as methods of raising awareness at the top. Four years before his own conversion to fascism, Noica's Credința texts described Romanian youths as being "diseased with politics".

Floarea de Foc was less categorical in its defense of the democratic state. According to cultural historian Zigu Ornea, who wrote an overview of Trăirism (published 1995), Tudor's other publication remained an "ideologically unaffiliated" magazine, and as such open to all sorts of political opinions. For Paul Costin Deleanu, the Orthodoxist columnist at Floarea de Foc, the legacy of Romanian liberalism was suspect, and Orthodox Romania existed outside the Western world. Deleanu's Floarea de Foc articles described modernization and secularism as a "betrayal" of "the Eastern cross." Eliade's contributions backed up such claims from an antihumanist point of view. He was suggesting that Romanian liberalism, an "abstract defense of Man", was a "dead, barren, inefficient formula", stifling "our nation's creative forces". Writing for Credința in February 1934, "Plăeșu" explained that he did not mean to defend either fascism, "Hitlerism", or "ridiculous" Marxism, since they trampled on religious freedoms; Eliade idealized direct action in support of "civic pride", "social justice" and "the courage to defend liberty".

Early in 1934, after the Guard managed to assassinate Premier Ion G. Duca, the authorities shut down Cuvântul and prosecuted its editor, whereas Credința continued to appear. Young fascists took their revenge, attacking the editorial offices of left-wing periodicals. In December 1934, an unknown man surprised Tudor at his Credința office, and gave him a severe beating. However, in February 1935, Sandu Tudor was making his peace with Nae Ionescu, describing his teaching as the "nourishing bread", and Ionescu himself as an "awakener of consciences", "one of the greatest journalists alive." Credința also published an homage piece by a Glicon Monahul, who depicted Ionescu as a guardian of "The True Faith".

=== Criterion scandal ===
Soon after that episode, Tudor and Eliade found themselves in opposite camps. It happened once Eliade's literary and art club, Criterion, opened its doors to several of Tudor's ideological enemies. Credința seized on an opportunity for scandal, accusing several Criterion people (Comarnescu, Vulcănescu, Alexandru Christian Tell, and dancer Gabriel Negri) of promoting "pederasty". Researcher Ruxandra Cesereanu describes Tudor's allegations as a diversion: "The scandal had erupted for political and cultural reasons, and reflected a series of backstage arrangements that had exploded in dishonorable manner." According to historian Lucian Boia, the decisive factor was Stancu, already infamous as a blackmailer; the main victim was Comarnescu, who suffered a nervous breakdown. Art historian Barbu Brezianu, who witnessed the incidents as a Criterion admirer, calls the Credința articles "horrible calumnies aimed at Comarnescu."

The campaign was aggravated when Vulcănescu showed up at the Credința offices and pummeled Stancu, and degenerated further when Tudor himself participated in a brawl at Corso Coffeehouse. Brezianu recalls that Vulcănescu "grabbed Sandu Tudor by the collar", then slapped him. The incidents disgraced both sides. Stancu's gossip column introduced the infamous homophobic taunt cavaleri de Curlanda ("Knights of Courland", with a pun on the word cur, "ass"). With Comarnescu and Negri in mind, Tudor himself wrote: "Only now do we get to see all the pestilent buggery in their unfulfilled, masturbating, inverted souls. I shout for all to hear, I address this thirty-year-some non-generation: avast! thou tricksters, though barren and vicious ones, thou that are rotten to the core, mediocre and neurotic". According to Ornea: "The strange fact is that Sandu Tudor, a religious poet and trained theologian [...], could stoop down to the level of such inurbane attacks".

Credința took its battle to court, in a trial still that was still ongoing during the troubled autumn of 1935. Brezianu recalls that Tudor was the plaintiff, citing Vulcănescu for assault and injury. Criterion's Mihail Sebastian, a practicing attorney, represented Comarnescu and Vulcănescu in court, seconded by Ionel Jianu (better known as an art critic). Sebastian's Journal, discovered and published in the 1990s, documents the hidden aspects of the affair: the Jewish Sebastian writes that, at the time, the Credința journalists and some members of Criterion were more or less openly antisemitic; Eliade surprised him as an "extreme and categorical" supporter of fascism. He was also upset that, while he stood by his friends and refused to even shake Tudor's hand, Comarnescu made "peace overtures to Credința".

In his entry for November 27, 1935, Sebastian concludes: "I am waiting for the day when [Criterion members] make their peace with Sandu Tudor [...] and discover that the Jews are alone responsible for the quarrel—especially myself, who has aroused discord among the Christian fraternity. It sounds like a joke, but it's plausible enough." Almost a year later, when Credința focused its attack on Sebastian, the latter noted: "The only thing that surprises me is that the attack came so late." Tudor and Stancu were defeated in court, and were obliged to formally recant. Ornea, who writes that Credința only published the verdict with much reluctance and discretion ("somewhere deep in the pages of one issue"), concludes that the scandal was a decisive blow for Criterion, causing Eliade's club to dissolve itself.

However, while some former members of Criterion were attracted into the Iron Guard, the Credința writers were still critical of totalitarianism. Before a fascist government was formed by the minor National Christian Party, Credința hosted contributions from Alexandru Mironescu, the physicist and center-nationalist author. These documented the encroachment of liberal democracy in Europe, defended political freedoms, and honored Romanian peacemaker Nicolae Titulescu. Although situated to the left, Credința and Floarea de Foc were largely anti-communistic, and Tudor's own news digests took a highly critical view of the Soviet Union. In one such piece, he expressed alarm about the outcome of the Moscow Trials. However, according to files kept by the Siguranța Statului police force, Tudor still intended to collaborate with communist agent Scarlat Callimachi on the anti-fascist review Munca ("The Labor").

=== Kulygin and the Burning Bush ===
As noted by Neagu Rădulescu, Credința came to an abrupt "sad end", which Tudor took shame in recounting. An focused on his new passion, aviation, and bragged about having survived a plane crash. He maintained his religious focus during World War II. The Ion Antonescu dictatorship joined in Nazi Germany's attack on the Soviet Union. Romania's war on the Eastern Front gave an impetus to Romanian monastic life, by restoring the Romanian church's direct contacts with Russian Orthodoxy. The country witnessed the arrival of Russian monks, including one trained at the prestigious Optina Monastery. He was Ivan Kulygin (known to Romanians as Ivan Kulîghin, Ivan Kulâghin, or Ivan Străinul, lit. "Ivan the Foreigner"), a victim of the Soviet regime, who took refuge to Romania after the Battle of Stalingrad.

At around that time, Tudor and his friends organized a pilgrimage to Cernăuți, in newly reattached Bukovina. There, he began writing about the possibility of more regular "spiritual retreats", and adopted the Transfiguration of Jesus as his spiritual symbol. He was soon joined in Bukovina by other figures of the Orthodoxist revival: Fathers Benedict Ghiuș and Nicolae M. Popescu, philosophers Noica and Anton Dumitriu, journalist colleagues Manoliu, Mironescu and Sterian.

Tudor and Andrei Scrima (later a major figure in Orthodox monasticism) first met Kulygin at Cernica Monastery, and were taken aback with his charisma. Kulygin instructed them about performing the "prayer of the heart", and Tudor, an avid student, was soon able to proselytize. His target audience included many of those who had joined him on the 1943 retreat, leading some of his biographers to suggest that Kulygin addressed a fully formed community of believers. An additional connection is noted by historiographers of Romanian hesychasm: the "prayer of the heart" was already practiced at Cernica, directly based on the instructions of 18th-century elder Paisius Velichkovsky; Kulygin's Romanian disciples were adding intellectualist interpretations to this regular practice.

In August 1944, King Michael's Coup ended Romania's alliance with Germany, and inaugurated a brief period of political liberalism, with communism looming on the horizon. Tudor and other Kulygin-inspired Romanians joined in the "Burning Pyre" (Rugul Aprins), a prayer group which sought to register as a citizens' association. The authorities rejected their first application, in 1944, but Tudor persisted: the Burning Bush received its legal recognition in 1945 or 1946. The association's stated purpose was to educate theology students about the moral and spiritual requirements of monastic life. The Burning Bush cell also offered a form of Orthodoxist resistance against the growth of communism in Romania. According to Scrima, it had "resurrected liberty".

=== At Antim ===
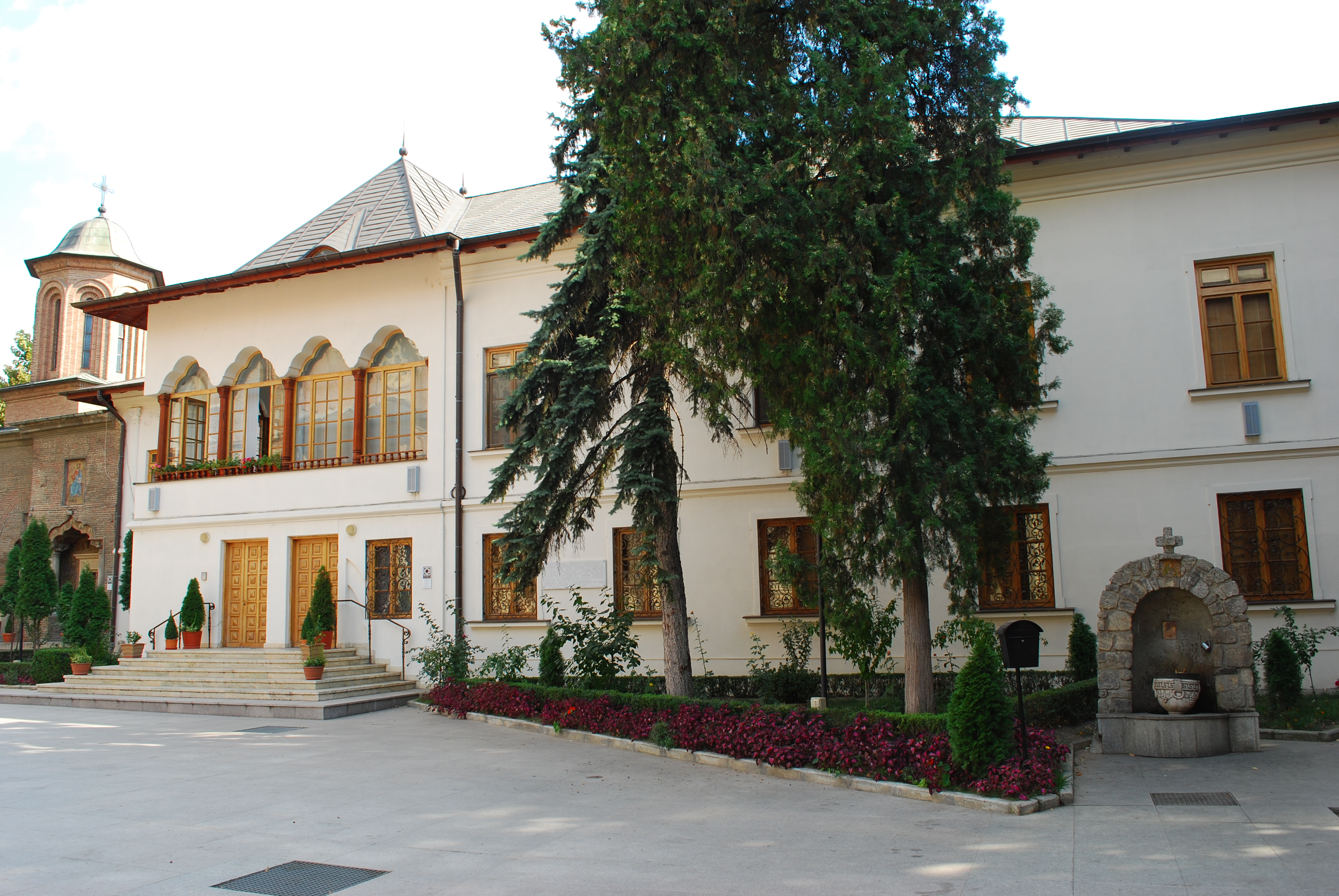
Antim Monastery. The living quarters

The Burning Bush met daily, usually at the Antim Monastery Library, Bucharest. Other than Tudor (Kulygin's trustee), Dumitriu, Mironescu, and Scrima, the group had among its members some high-profile intellectuals of various backgrounds. They include the avant-garde author Marcel Avramescu and critic Vladimir Streinu, poet-scientist Ion Barbu, mathematicians Valentin Poénaru and Octav Onicescu, novelist Ion Marin Sadoveanu, poet-physician Vasile Voiculescu etc. Together with historian Virgil Cândea came a cell of social scientists and classical scholars, among them Alexandru Duțu. They were joined by high-profile Orthodox clergymen: Ghiuș, Dumitru Stăniloae, Sofian Boghiu and Arsenie Papacioc. Another occasional guest was Bartolomeu Anania, the outspoken anti-communist priest.

The Rugul Aprins title was perhaps inherited from Floarea de Foc, or could be referencing the biblical burning bush, a manifestation of God. Scrima understood the meetings as "an Eucharist of God, brought to us by the angels", noting that the sessions were free, regulated only by "trust". Sandu Tudor would also explain that the incessant prayer is the very "heavenly prayer" of (sinless) Adam, revived by Virgin Mary "when she was taken to the Holy of Holies, where she lived in uninterrupted prayer [...] for 14 years".

Patristic scholar Ioan I. Ică Jr. sees Tudor's neo-hesychasm as a throwback to Paisius, with echoes from Gregory Palamas. However, according to religious anthropologist Radu Drăgan, hesychasm itself is a "prudent" form of Esoteric Christianity, and Tudor's movement a Gnostic revival "in the bosom of Orthodox spirituality", "the only one of its kind." Drăgan also notes that, among the affiliates, Avramescu, Dumitriu, and possibly Scrima, were esotericists of the "Guénonian" variety. In his interpretation, the Burning Pyre blended a Guénonian traditionalism into Kulygin's teachings and "Desert Fathers" monasticism, to the point of resembling a "new religious movement". A particularity of Tudor's movement was its critique of materialism. Opposed to Marxist doctrines and to the atheists, Tudor preached classical Creationism.

Soviet occupation troops arrested Kulygin in March 1946, and deported him back to Russia in early 1947. The missionary managed to send Tudor a series of farewell letters, appointing him his successor in Romania, the beneficiary of his will, and the representative of Optina rules. In his other briefs, Kulygin protests against being branded a "counter-revolutionary" under Soviet law, writing that his captors "understand nothing of things spiritual in nature", warning his disciples that they should hide all written records of their conversations. Records about what eventually happened to Kulygin are few and disputed. According to an unverified account, he died in the prison of Odessa, while others propose that he was transported to the Gulag.

In 1948, when the Burning Bush association was dissolved by government decree, Tudor abandoned his public career and became a monk at Antim, with the monastic name Agathon. That monastery received his entire estate, including his massive book collection. He also began writing his new religious poem: Imn-Acatist la Rugul Aprins al Născătoarei de Dumnezeu ("Hymn-Akathist to the Burning Pyre of the Theotokos"), with the refrain: Bucură-Te, Mireasă urzitoare de nesfârșită rugăciune! ("Rejoice, Thou Bride, Thou weaver of the eternal prayer!").

The proclamation of a Romanian communist state that year introduced a wave of repression against Orthodox devotees in general, and mystics in particular. Tudor left Bucharest altogether, moving between Crasna and Govora monasteries. His new project, to establish a monastery home for world-weary intellectuals, was supported by the local bishops. He was arrested in 1948 or 1949, and the Antim meetings, closely supervised by the Securitate secret police, ceased altogether in 1950. Fathers Ghiuș, Boghiu and Papacioc were moved far away from Bucharest, forced to reside at Neamț Monastery.

=== Final activities ===
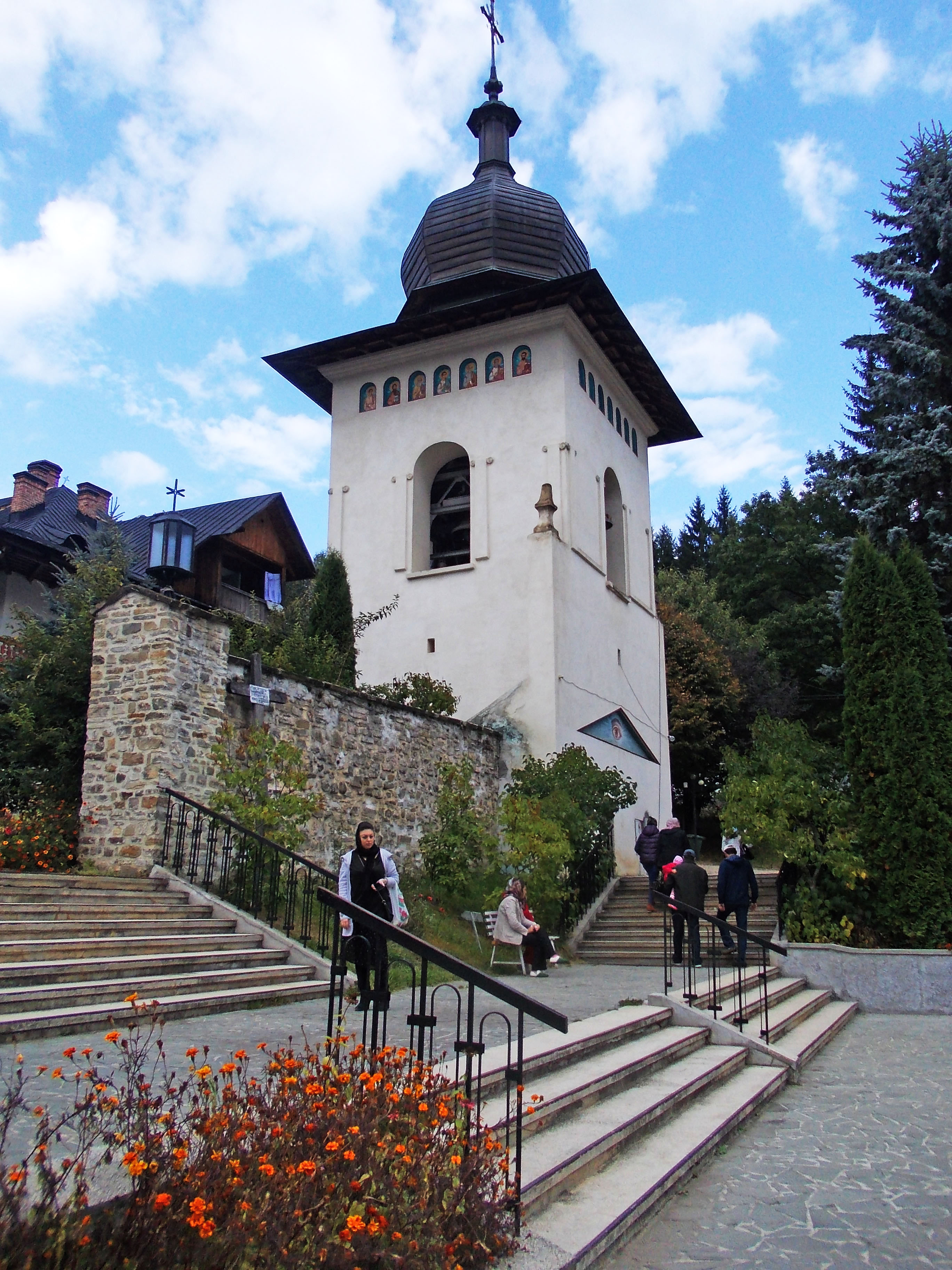
Church of the Nativity, part of the Sihăstria Monastery complex

When he reemerged from prison, in 1952, Brother Agathon decided to enter the priesthood as a hieromonk, and became Father Daniil. He was originally assigned to Crasna, then moved to more remotes sketes. After a stint at Sihăstria Monastery, he moved high up in the Rarău Mountains, Bukovina. With the help of Cleopa Ilie, the influential Orthodox preacher at Sihăstria, Daniil was appointed Starets. In this new capacity, he resumed the spreading of Kulygin's ideas, forming a prayer group with about a dozen followers, and outlined a new plan for a monastery of the intellectual elite.

According to his visitors at Rarău, Daniil was living an exemplary austere life, but was prioritizing the internal prayer over all exterior ritual, and would spend half a working day submerged in meditation. He did provide the occasional sermon, and earned much respect from the Bukovinian peasants he addressed, especially because he would freely express his emotions in front of them.

The communist regime caught eye of Tudor's frequent returns to Bucharest, where he contacted the other Burning Bush people, and continued to preach about the "prayer of the heart". Tudor's work was again becoming a kind of religious resistance and, as Drăgan writes, intolerable for the communists. Such activities were evading "the more readily controllable ecclesiastic milieu". The Securitate branded Tudor and Voiculescu as authors of "mystical, enemy-like" poetry, collecting testimonies about how Tudor's prayer group cultivated free speech. It is possible that the Burning Bush unwittingly antagonized the communists after its ideas were publicized outside the Eastern Bloc. In 1957, inspired by the self-exiled Scrima, theologian Olivier Clément wrote an essay about "Brother Agathon", which saw print in a Swiss Reformed newsletter.

However, according to Daniil's accuser Petre Pandrea, the Burning Bush group was not entirely adverse to collaborating with the communists. In his memoirs, Pandrea claims that Scrima and "the ex-sailor" Tudor were together responsible for slandering the anti-communist and religiously innovative nuns of Vladimirești, eventually rounded up by the Securitate with the tacit approval of Orthodox prelates. The Securitate tried to persuade Scrima to work as an informant on the Burning Bush, but came to the conclusion that "he presents no trust in what concerns our activity."

On the eve of June 14, 1958, Securitate forces descended on the Burning Bush. The group had officially been branded a danger to "the social order" of Communist Romania, reflecting the Securitate's fears about the country's monastic revival. The communist apparatus had ordered a full clampdown on the Orthodox Church, masterminded by Securitate chief Alexandru Drăghici.

Sandu Tudor was arrested in the home of his disciple Alexandru Mironescu, and kept in a cell together with a Securitate informant. According to the latter's taps, the Rarău hieromonk resented Scrima and Clément for having blown his cover—neither were aware that the Securitate had for long been intercepting all of Scrima's letters to his Burning Bush colleagues. Subjected to interrogations, Tudor refused to nominate any of his student followers, and was apathetic during the interrogations of supposed witnesses. As noted by researcher Ioana Diaconescu, Tudor's unyielding stance may have even served to inspire the Securitate spy in his cell, whose notes indicate a growing admiration and a shared Orthodox faith.

=== Kangaroo trial ===
With an August 4 raid, the Securitate apprehended most of Tudor's disciples. In the end, the Burning Bush was made subject to a kangaroo trial for high treason, officially defined as "crime of conspiracy against the social order and crime of intense activity against the working class and the revolutionary movement." According to one of the co-defendants, the accusation was incoherent and misleading. It claimed that the prayer group intended to have government members burned at the stake, and that the 4th-century theologians honored at Antim were anti-communists. The sentences, Drăgan notes, "were known in advance".

Cherry-picking the defendants' political files, prosecution determined that the Burning Bush was a neo-fascist cell and a front for the Iron Guard. In doing so, they silenced evidence about Tudor's left-wing anti-fascism, and focused on Arsenie Papacioc's history of contacts with the Guard. Tudor cared little about the past activities of his Burning Bush colleagues, but, even in 1947, he had denounced the Iron Guard as an anti-Christian enterprise.

As records of the prosecution show, the authorities were on the verge of admitting that the hieromonk had no criminal connections, and decided instead to focus on his activities as a 1930s anti-communist. They recovered Tudor's Credința columns, which, they claimed, read as "intense anti-communist propaganda, slandering and defiling the Soviet Union and eulogizing the capitalist order." According to their tendentious interpretation, Tudor had been at once "a faithful defender of the bourgeois-landowning order and a fiery propagator of the fascist ideology." The defense team was also asked to debunk the prosecution's allegations about the fascist nature of Tudor's Creationism. According to one Burning Bush attorney, "that some students were informed about Creationism is, if anything, a matter to be addressed by education, not by punitive measures".

At the height of the anti-religious campaigns, in 1959, the Rarău skete was one of the establishments that were temporarily shut down by the Securitate. Father Daniil, identified as the ringleader "Teodorescu Alexandru", was sentenced to "25 years in strict confinement and 10 years disfranchisement" for "conspiracy against the social order", and "15 years in rigorous confinement" for "intense activity against the working class." He was originally held at Jilava Prison, where he began serving his sentence on January 31, 1959. The Securitate was on the search for his belongings. Tudor proudly indicated that he never carried any personal items. His other belongings, hosted by the monastery, became state property. They include some 600 books, a fountain pen, a lens, and a compass.

=== Death ===
As historians would discover decades later, Daniil Sandu Tudor spent the last part of his life in the infamous Aiud Prison. He was held there together with other Burning Bush group members, but also reunited with his old rival, Petre Pandrea. Pandrea mentions Tudor's name on his humorous list, the "Writers' Union of Aiud"—an unwitting alternative to the official, communized, Writers' Union of Romania.

At Aiud, Tudor became a victim of repeated torture, and, according to various commentators, suffered a martyr's death. Burning Bush inmate Roman Braga attesteded that: "Father Daniil died in the Aiud Hole following four months of tortures and beatings, one of the few prisoners to have worn shackles throughout their detention". Also held in Aiud, Bartolomeu Anania later attested that both he and Tudor went through the process of "reeducation", a communist form of coercive persuasion. As a former sympathizer of the Iron Guard, Anania clashed with the hieromonk, who reportedly supported the use of reeducation methods against obdurate fascists.

Officially, Daniil died at 1 AM on November 17, 1962 (1960 in some sources), at the Aiud Prison hospital, having suffered a stroke that left him comatose—afflictions which, in themselves, seem to suggest that he had been severely beaten in confinement. Prison records have it that, since 1959, he had been under medical supervision for hypertonia. However, it is unlikely that he was ever administered the medicine specified in his chart, which appears to have been forged and backdated. The hieromonk's body is said to have been dumped at the nearby Trei Plopi burial site, an iron spike driven through his heart by prison guards who meant to certify Tudor's death.

== Legacy ==
=== Censorship and recovery ===
According to Diaconescu: "With Sandu Tudor's death, the world of the spirit and of the faith was extinguished, violently and savagely crushed, at least in its worldly form." However, Orthodoxist philosopher Petre Țuțea implies, the incarceration had the unexpected effect of strengthening hesychasm, since the Cernica school and the Kulygin school could still communicate behind the prison doors. Vasileanu also writes that, from among Father Daniil's disciples at Rarău, "most would, strangely enough, become Starestses". One of them, Antonie Plămădeală, was even enthroned as an Orthodox Church dignitary. According to Plămădeală, "The pyre of the heart never was extinguished". Already in the period after Tudor's death, the Aiud collective had begun referring to him as "Saint Daniil".

Bartolomeu Anania was among the last people to be sentenced in connection with the Burning Bush movement. Tried separately, and probably drugged on scopolamine, he agreed to become a Securitate informant. Vasile Voiculescu was the first of Tudor's spiritual followers to be granted a reprieve, in 1962. He was severely weakened by repeated torture, terminally ill with Pott disease, and only survived into 1963. The other Burning Bush affiliates were all released from prison in 1964, when the communist regime enforced a set of liberalization measures.

Sandu Tudor's literary work was banned by communist censors. His Burning Bush manuscripts were confiscated by the Securitate, and presumably destroyed or lost. Using his contacts abroad, Father Scrima typed and salvaged some of Tudor and Voiculescu's last known texts, including an akathist to the Theotokos. He took them to India, where he began a second career in Sanskritology, or, in Securitate parlance, "placed himself in the service of imperialists."

The Romanian Revolution of 1989, which brought down Romanian communism, also signified a recovery of Sandu Tudor's work. Andrei Scrima played a significant part in Burning Bush revivalism, publishing several new introductions to Father Daniil's preachings, including the 1991 Timpul Rugului Aprins ("Age of the Burning Bush"). In 1999, a neo-Orthodoxist publishing house (Editura Anastasia) issued Sandu Tudor's autobiography and other selected works: Ieromonahul Daniil Sandu Tudor. Another such venture (Editura Christiana) began putting out installments of his complete works.

Tudor's exact date of death was still a mystery: various post-revolutionary sources have it that he most likely died in 1960, and specify that his place of burial was unknown. Other working theories located that event in 1962 or 1963. The matter was partly solved ca. 2006, when scholars were given clearance for selectively researching Securitate archives. In keeping with his renunciation of earthly possessions, Tudor left behind only a handful of personal belongings: a fufaika jacket, a pair of sandals, a brown shirt and a beret. All were marked as "3rd-class quality" goods.

Although the general location of his burial is known, Daniil's grave was never rediscovered. According to one account, Aiud prisoners working on a ditch in the 1960s dug up a shackle-wearing skeleton, and were convinced that it belonged to their spiritual leader. The bodily remains are still judged irretrievable, and he is commemorated together with other prisoners with whom he presumably shares an improvised grave in Aiud.

=== Enduring controversy ===
Several theologians and priests came to suggest that Daniil Sandu Tudor is worthy of canonization. This proposal is endorsed by Marius Vasileanu (who otherwise notes that "nonsense and inexactitudes" about the hieromonk still exist in his official biographies) and by Tudor's pupil, Antonie Plămădeală. In December 2006, speaking before Parliament and outlining his resolution to condemn communism, President Traian Băsescu paid homage to Sandu Tudor as a "martyr of the Church".

Tudor's other activities, particularly his polemical stances of the 1930s, created enduring controversies, beyond Pandrea's allegations. Published shortly after the Duca assassination, Eliade's novel Întoarcerea din rai ("Return from Paradise") constructed the character Eleazar by fusing together Comarnescu's "words" and Tudor's "ticks". Tudor's attacks on Criterion, and the homophobic vocabulary he introduced, have been cited as possible influences for România Mare, a modern-day far-right weekly directed by Corneliu Vadim Tudor. According to Barbu Brezianu, Vadim Tudor resembles the Sandu Tudor of 1934, and, like him, is an "aggressive extremist."

After Pandrea, critics have continued to scrutinize some aspects of Tudor's monastic life. Bartolomeu Anania first publicized his claim about Father Daniil's alleged support of communist "reeducation" in his Memoirs (Polirom, 2008). Historian Cristian Vasile nuances this verdict, suggesting that Anania was "embittered" by his political background:

Sandu Tudor was no Guardsman, not even a Guard sympathizer; in the 1930s he was rather the leftist, criticizing the far right. Therefore, he defined himself as anti-Guard even in his freedom years [...]; he probably thought, in 1935 like in 1962, that Guardsmen ought 'to be dusting off their conscience of the crimes they committed in the name of the Cross'.
