= Dumitru Karnabatt =

Romanian poet, art critic and political journalist

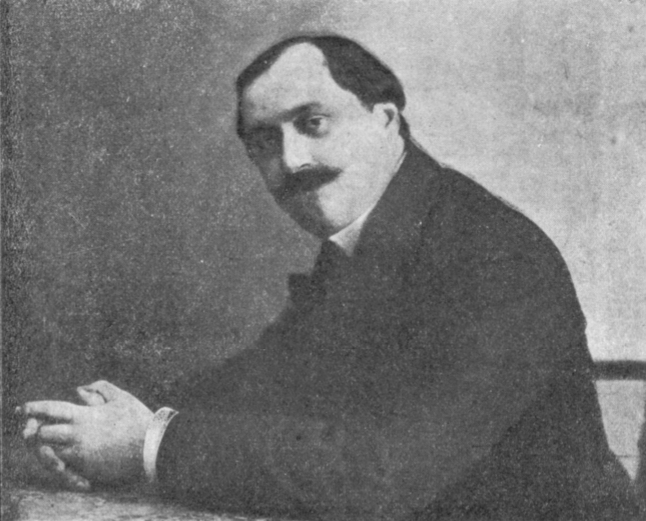
- Born: October 26, 1877; Giurgiu, Romania
- Died: April 1949 (aged 71)
- Occupations: poet, art critic, columnist
- Writing career
- Pen name: Censor, D. Karr, Don Ramiro
- Period: c. 1898–1944
- Genres: biography, collaborative fiction, essay, feuilleton, hagiography, memoir, travel literature
- Movements: Symbolism, Impressionism, Decadence, Literatorul

Dumitru or Dimitrie Karnabatt (last name also Karnabat, Carnabatt or Carnabat, commonly known as D. Karr; October 26, 1877 – April 1949) was a Romanian poet, art critic and political journalist, one of the minor representatives of Symbolism. He was a disciple of both Alexandru Macedonski and Ștefan Petică, representing the conservative and mystical school of Romanian Symbolism, and a regular contributor to the newspaper Seara. He is also remembered as the husband and, for a while, literary partner of novelist Lucrezzia Karnabatt.

Karnabatt had a controversial career, particularly so during World War I. Strongly Russophobic, and skeptical of the Entente Powers, he gave full endorsement to Germany and the Central Powers. His collaborationism, exemplified by the propaganda articles he wrote for Gazeta Bucureștilor, earned him a jail sentence in March 1919. He was ultimately released in January 1920, but the scandal still had repercussion throughout the 1920s, hindering his career in the interwar press.

Mystical symbolism was a constant of Karnabatt's literary work. In the 1930s and '40s, the poet publicized his admiration for Roman Catholicism in general, and for Franciscan dogma in particular. These beliefs were echoed in his final essays and poems, which received mixed reviews.

== Biography ==
=== Early life and debut years ===
As noted by historian Lucian Boia, the journalist-poet was a Bulgaro-Romanian with an "evidently non-Romanian" surname, but patriotic and anti-Slavic by conviction. A Karnabatt (or Carnabat) family took refuge to Bucharest after the Russo-Turkish War of 1828. It took its name from the town of Karnobat, Bulgaria, but became fully Romanianized upon arrival.

Dumitru Karnabatt was born in Giurgiu, the Danube city-port. His first recorded public activity was as an 1890s socialist, who took part in cultural debates at Sotir Hall, Bucharest. Years later, the poet would recall his meeting with the socialist Symbolist Traian Demetrescu, in "the chilled and smoky tavern" of Sotir. Although his journalistic debut is dated to 1902, when his talents were enlisted by Observatorul newspaper, Karnabatt himself indicated that, in the 1890s, he worked alongside Demetrescu, both of them as reporters from Parliament.

In the second half of 1897, Karnabatt was sending his chronicles and his poems to critic Garabet Ibrăileanu, who hosted them in the literary newspaper Noutatea. In early 1898, the young author, using his pen name "D. Karr", became a staff writer for the family magazine Foaia Populară, where he later contributed an obituary of Demetrescu. Karnabatt's editorial debut came in 1901, when he published, in Bucharest, the poetry volume Crini albi ("White Lilies"). Two years later, as "D. Karr", he put out a selection of his Opale și rubine ("Opals and Rubies"), followed in 1906 by Poemele Visului ("Poems of the Dream"), and in 1907 by Harpegiĭ ("Arpeggios").

In the literary world, "D. Karr" was becoming known as a talented poet but also considered "unruly", for his heavy recourse to neologisms. Karnabatt's experiments already attested his spiritual attachment to Symbolism. They showed the influence exercised on him by Macedonski's poetry of colors and light, and, in Poemele Visului, his discovery of a Belgian master, Georges Rodenbach. Researcher Ștefan Cazimir has reviewed such poetry as a Romanian literary equivalent of Secession art, noting Karnabatt's take on the sexual metaphors of Secession graphics: luscious hair, sirens, pallor etc.

Karnabatt moved away from the socialists, whom he criticized, decades after the fact, for their "uncouth, massive and compact materialism, which denied categorically and offensively any prospect of spirituality and metaphysics". Together with D. Nanu, he followed the dissident Symbolism of Ștefan Petică, who advocated a militant, para-Symbolist, form of the Decadent movement. His poems and his articles incorporated numerous references to Rococo aesthetics, contrasting the "fine, delicate touches" of 18th-century life with the roughness of modernity.

=== Hermes, Minerva, Seara ===
The Symbolist school took note of Karnabatt's stances. In 1903, addressing the world's Francophones, essayist Theodor Cornel rated Karr the third-best Romanian poet in history. A year later, Revista Literară (a direct successor of Macedonski's Literatorul) hosted some of his work. Karnabatt was then given a positive reception by Mihail G. Holban's Revista Idealistă and the Symbolist journal Vieața Nouă, to the irritation of more traditionalist reviewers, who dismissed "D. Karr" as a frivolous and talentless individual.

By 1903, Karnabatt had met fellow Symbolist Alexandru Petroff and, like Petică, was writing for Petroff's magazine, Hermes. He was also editorial secretary at Henric Streitman's Observatorul. In 1905, he was also contributing to Românul Literar, a Macedonskian literary gazette directed by C. A. Ionescu-Caion. In September 1909, honoring a Minerva invitation, D. Karnabatt and novelist Mihail Sadoveanu went on a hiking tour of the Bucegi Mountains, from Caraiman to Cerbului Valley. Their travelogue was published in Minerva's 1910 almanac.

In 1910, Karnabatt became a star contributor to the daily Seara. Like Minerva, this was property of Grigore Gheorghe Cantacuzino, the Conservative Party magnate, but was managed for him by the influential art patron, Alexandru Bogdan-Pitești. Karnabatt, who often signed his articles there with the self-mocking pen name Censor, or as Don Ramiro, was a regular attendant of Bogdan-Pitești's literary club.

It was around that time that Dumitru encountered and married Lucrezzia, a socialite, writer, and famed beauty. According to writer-caricaturist Neagu Rădulescu, she inflamed the passion of high school students and young officers alike; with time, however, she became morbidly obese. Writing for Seara, the Karnabatts introduced their original combination of collaborative fiction and travel literature, tracing their journey through the Low Countries, Bavaria, Switzerland and Austria-Hungary. These accounts were rediscovered in 2007 by the literary critic Angelo Mitchievici, who calls them a mix of impressionist literature and Decadent prose, with nods in the direction of Rodenbach's Bruges-la-Morte, and utterly opposed to the standards of literary diaries.

However, Karnabatt remained a conservative among the Symbolists, opposed to the fashion of artistic primitivism, and locked in disputes with the primitivist half of Tinerimea Artistică salon. Already in 1910, in what later critics have read as a sign of his obtuseness, Karnabatt ridiculed Constantin Brâncuși over his modern primitive sculptures, Sagesse and The Kiss. With his repeated rebukes at Tinerimea painters, Karr cited as his mentor the culture critic and mystic Sâr Péladan, who had repeatedly censured the "horrors" of modern art. One of his Seara columns (June 7, 1911) commends Alexis Macedonski, Alexandru's son and illustrator, as an absolute artist.

Lucrezzia Karnabatt's own contribution to Seara ends abruptly, in 1911. She probably had a quarrel with Bogdan-Pitești, against whom she preserved a lifelong grudge. Even though the Karnabatts did not formally separate, their marriage was a public failure; Lucrezzia preferred to focus on her separate literary career, her feminist activities, and her eccentric hobbies (including the study of Spiritism). In the literary community, rumor spread that she was also hypersexual.

=== Symbolist campaign ===
During the early 1910s, Karnabatt joined several of Romania's Symbolist circles and literary magazines. His overview of the Symbolist literary scene was published by Revista Idealistă in its first issue for 1911. In November, writing for Minerva, he greeted the fellow Symbolist Victor Eftimiu, whose play Înșir'te mărgărite had just been staged with "very original" cinematic effects. By March 1912, Karnabatt was a contributor to the Bârlad journal Freamătul, where he published notes in memory of his deceased mentor, Ștefan Petică. With other such biographical notes, Karnabatt was also published by Flacăra of Bucharest. Working with the popular review Ilustrațiunea Națională in 1912, D. Karr put out its feuilleton, Idila din Venezzia ("Venice Idyll"), which depicted the love affair between Alfred de Musset and George Sand.

The radical Symbolist Ion Minulescu co-opted Karabatt on his Insula magazine, which published only three issues, in spring 1912. Although short-lived, Minulescu's publication coagulated the message of Romanian Symbolism, and created a tight cell of relatively young writers: Minulescu, Karnabatt, Mihail Cruceanu, Emil Isac, Claudia Millian, Nae Ionescu, Eugeniu Sperantia etc. Karnabatt still worked at Minerva newspaper, earning the sympathy of other literary reviewers. According to one of them, Ilarie Chendi, Karnabatt was a remarkable "impressionist", and, with Steuerman-Rodion, one of Romania's best cultural journalists.

Interviewed by Cruceanu for Rampa, Karr assessed: "Today, people no longer laugh when they are recalled about Symbolism, Macedonski [or] Petică". To the dissatisfaction of traditionalist readers, he also opined that the young Symbolists had "elevated themselves far above the generic things"—but admitted that they were yet to produce their own "grand poet", Macedonski being "rather the forerunner of Symbolism".

However, the reputation of Symbolism as artistic revolution was already being threatened from abroad. In late 1910, a concerned Karnabatt read news about the invention of Futurism, an Italian current that promoted modern subjectivity and rejected the traditional norms. In his Seara column, Karnabatt rejoiced at news that Futurist Filippo Tommaso Marinetti had been arrested for obscenity, declaring himself shocked at the Futurists' transgression of sexual and racial conventions. In his interpretation, the Futurists were a throwback to the Migration Period, in the heart of "art and idealism". In reference to Marinetti, he remarked: "will nobody tie down that demented man?" Karnabatt's pronouncements were rejected by one of Rampa's young journalists, Poldi Chapier, who held the conviction that Futurism was going to save the world of arts.

The coronation of Karnabatt's work as a poet and publicist came in December 1912, when he was elected one of two Secretaries of the Romanian Writers' Society (SSR). Karnabatt was also present at the establishment of a journalists' trade union, the General Association of the Press, and stood on its steering committee, with Streitman, I. Hussar, Constantin Bacalbașa, Barbu Brănișteanu, Constantin Costa-Foru, Scarlat Lahovary, and Constantin Mille (January 1913). Still, according to Boia, Karnabatt was exceptionally active, but "truly insignificant" as a writer. Mitchievici describes Karnabatt as the author of "unjustly forgotten" Decadent poetry. A "competent", if casual, art critic, Karnabatt supposedly had a more lasting impact on the "mundane and modern" sphere of urban folklore.

=== 1913–1916 ===
The politically troubled year 1913 caught D. Karnabatt as a contributor for the magazine Sărbătoarea Eroilor, whose editors were Symbolist poets Alexandru Colorian and Sperantia. Fellow journalist I. Peltz, who met Karnabatt around that time, recalls: "He was a massive man, solid and thick, with an Oriental face (one could have thought him a Turk), and with sparkling eyes. His articles for the gazette [...] were in actuality prose poems". Karnabatt, Peltz argues, was "a nawab when it came to metaphors", squandering his talent on small game, refusing himself "the literary status that he so deserved."

Karr was also becoming friends with the more prestigious Symbolists Tudor Arghezi, Gala Galaction and N. D. Cocea, frequenting their circle at Arghezi's Bucharest home. In March 1913, Arghezi joined Bogdan-Pitești's staff at Seara. During the Second Balkan War, which he witnessed from the side, Karnabatt was highly active in political journalism, publishing at length about the more shady aspects of Romania's campaign in Dobruja. Karnabatt was one of four journalists risking trial for the slander of Romanian Land Forces commanders, but was defended by his colleagues in the press, who staged formal protests in his name.

The situation in Bucharest became especially tense with the start of World War I. As Romania preserved her Entente-friendly neutrality, Karnabatt and Seara became supporters of the Central Powers, or "Germanophiles". The first clues were shown in July 1914, when Karnabatt published articles blaming the Kingdom of Serbia for the Sarajevo Assassination, while also criticizing the interventionists. When it became clear that the Central Powers were engaged in a complex war with the Russian Empire, Karnabatt's Russophobia came into effect, and he called on Romania to join Germany for the recovery of Bessarabia. He adhered to this position until October 1915, when the Kingdom of Bulgaria, a Slavic country, joined the Central Powers. In Karnabatt's view, this signaled that a territorial race had begun: with a "Greater Bulgaria" in the making, Romania needed to extend its eastern borders even beyond Bessarabia, to the Dnieper River.

His political essay, Rusia în fața cugetărei românești("Russia vs. the Romanian Idea"), came out at Editura Minerva, in 1915. In this booklet, Karnabatt explains his fear of Pan-Slavism, calling it "the great peril facing Latindom", and rejoices at Russia's Great Retreat. In early summer 1916, Karnabatt traveled to Germany, and sent back notes about the state of affairs in that country. According to these, the Germans, far from the "barbarians" depicted in Entente propaganda, were impeccably organized, while the Entente's immediate future was "bankruptcy".

=== Collaboration and arrest ===
A year after Rusia în fața cugetărei românești, Romania signed its pact with the Entente, declaring war on Germany and Austria-Hungary. Following initial successes in the Battle of Transylvania, the Romanian Land Forces were pushed back, and southern Romania fell to the Central Powers. Karnabatt stayed behind in occupied Bucharest. Together with Arghezi, Ioan Slavici, Saniel Grossman and Dem. Theodorescu, he began writing for the collaborationist daily, Gazeta Bucureștilor, in December 1916. His first articles there proclaimed that the Romanian armies still putting up a fight in Moldavia did so not out of conviction, but because they had become "slaves to the Ruskies".

According to diarist Pia Alimănișteanu, who lived through the period in occupied Bucharest, Karnabatt and Slavici were also barometers of Germanophile disinformation: "The more violent they are against the interventionists [...], that's how much more difficult things ought to be for the krauts fighting on the front." Karnabatt took on the old regime, still represented in Moldavia by the refugee government of Ion I. C. Brătianu. In his view, Brătianu deserved the death penalty for having signed Romania to the Entente. However, he contended, the moral crisis would bring about "a new Romania", free from "politicking" and "oriental statesmanship". Karnabatt's notes in Gazeta Bucureștilor became famous for their attacks on Ferdinand I, the pro-Entente King of Romania, borrowing their tone from prewar republicans. Lastly, Karnabatt and Slavici's pieces stood out for their Anglophobia: having already theorized that the war was carried by British imperialism (see Gott strafe England), Karnabatt later suggested that the English were natural-born sadists.

Under the occupation, Karnabatt also became a contributor to Macedonski's Literatorul review, in its final series (he joined the Literatorul group at roughly the same time as Tudor Vianu and Vasile Militaru). He then restated his preference for Symbolism with a topical essay in the magazine Renașterea (October 1918). Karnabatt was still writing poetry in 1917 and 1918, putting out two new volumes of verse: Crini albi și roșii ("Lilies of White and Red"), with Independența Printers, and, at Poporul Publishers, Mozaic bizantin ("Byzantine Mosaic"). Macedonski welcomed such works as evidence that Karnabatt was his worthy pupil—namely, that he had adopted the "symphonic verse" method, "whose foundations have been set by Literatorul as early as 1880".

After the Armistice with Germany in November 1918, the Brătianu administration and King Ferdinand made a triumphal return to Bucharest. A while after, the King's Commissioner placed the Gazeta Bucureștilor men under arrest, in a Bucharest hotel, allegedly because they were considered a threat to the Entente soldiers stationed in Romania. By February, they were in custody at Văcărești Prison, expecting to be court-martialled. They issued a formal protest, citing government abuse, and noting that their case had been cut off from the other Germanophile activities—and from its political context.

At Văcărești, Slavici and his co-defendants bunked together, and were briefly joined by other arrested Germanophiles: Bogdan-Pitești, A. de Herz. Slavici revisited the period in his memoir, My Prisons. There, Karnabatt is described as a "tall, well-fed, idle man", whose only interests were reading and chewing on his smoking pipe. The state's case against Karnabatt relied on evidence of treason: Gazeta Bucureștilor had effectively been founded by the Germans. In his defense, Karnabatt noted that Gazeta "only employed Romanians", meaning that he was not sold out to the enemy, but merely politically incorrect. Before the end of March, Karnabatt and Grossman had been convicted, each to a 10-year imprisonment; Arghezi and Slavici received less severe punishments.

=== Release and return ===
The Germanophiles' fortunes changed in late 1919, when the Romanian National Party took over power. Persuaded by his new ministers, King Ferdinand signed an amnesty decree; Karnabatt and the others were home in time to celebrate Old-Style Christmas (January 1920). After this, Karnabatt and Lucrezzia took an extended trip to Italy, where they visited and wrote about Venice. Upon their return, the Romanian literary community took the Karnabatts back into its fold: in August 1920, Dumitru's poem Veneția ("Venice"), which is in fact about a voyage into the afterlife.

From 1921, D. Karnabatt made his return to cultural journalism, his work taken up by Flacăra, and by Pamfil Șeicaru's Ora and Hiena. During the first 1920s, texts signed by him were published in Alfred Hefter-Hidalgo's "independent newspaper", Lumea; in the illustrated monthly Gloria României; and in the "independent national radical" organ Solia Satelor. His work continued to be appreciated by the Symbolists, but was derided elsewhere. According to literary critic George Călinescu, the aging Macedonski was surrounded by a "host of pygmies", and the "obscure" Karnabatt was just one of them.

For a while, the Karnabatts relocated to the new Romanian province, Transylvania, to help with the establishment of Romanian-language publications in Cluj. His poetry was hosted by the Transylvanian literary review, Gândirea, in its Issues 1, 2, 4 and 5 for 1921. Karnabatt also took over as managing director of a Cluj-based political newspaper, Înfățirea. The latter venue soon entered a conflict with the native Transylvanian journalists, whom it depicted as unprepared and talentless. In reaction, Cultura Poporului newspaper informed its readers that, although indeed talented, Karnabatt was a convict and a political suspect, and called for the Romanian press to be "purified" of such characters.

After 1925, Karnabatt was contributing to the Bucharest political newspaper Cuvântul, and to the relaunched conservative daily, Epoca. From 1926, he also sent his texts to the Bucharest daily Politica, encouraged by Hefter-Hidalgo's appointment as the editorial director. He joined the Bucharest Journalists' Circle, a friendly society established in 1931.

An occasional contributor to Șeicaru's Curentul, Karnabatt was also working with Îndreptarea, a tribune of the People's Party. In May 1935, it published his memoir, Un București de altădată ("The Bucharest of Yesteryear"), later cited for its biographical details on Symbolist author Alexandru Obedenaru. His scattered articles include a 1932 chronicle in Lupta, popularizing the poetry of biochemist Vintilă Ciocâlteu.

Still denouncing modernist experimentation, Karnabatt clashed with the 1920s avant-garde. In a 1925 article published by Rampa, he described "ultramodern art" as a "technical cacophony" and "aesthetic charlatanry". His concept of art was in turn ridiculed by the avant-garde publicist Sașa Pană, in the 1936 pamphlet Sadismul adevărului ("Sadism of Truth").

=== Franciscan conversion ===
Late in his life, Karnabatt became a voice in support of the Roman Catholic Church, experiencing what literary historian Lidia Bote calls "poetic, Franciscan, Catholicism." However, the Karnabatts were most likely not Catholics: according to Mitchievici, they both had "a Catholic sensitivity", but were equally interested in practicing Esoteric Christianity or Spiritism. In the Greek-Catholic paper Vestitorul, Dumitru proposed that Spiritism was "a new form of the faith, one that does not contradict the dogmas of Christianity." To the Catholic press, Karnabatt appeared a man "of strong Christian convictions", but essentially an outsider.

Karnabatt's devotion to Saint Francis took him on pilgrimage to Assisi, where, in 1937, he spent a full vacation month. As he noted in Vestitorul, that was "perhaps the happiest month of my life". During the same year, after an intercession a Writers' Society intercession, Mayor Al. Gheorghe Donescu rewarded Carol Ardeleanu, Alexandru Cazaban, Mihail Sorbul with their own Bucharest homes. All four buildings were within walking range. Consequently, the four writers inhabiting them became not just neighbors, but also drinking friends.

Those years witnessed an escalation of political violence, correlated with the rise of antisemitism. The Bucharest Journalists' Circle broke down after political and ethnic conflicts. Following the conflict between the Iron Guard and the National Christian regime, all the radically fascist press organs were shut down. After the imposition of censorship, Karnabatt was still present at Curentul, where he wrote on Christian subjects, and published an homage to the Franciscan poet Ion Gârleanu.

In 1942, Karnabatt put out his own romanticized biography, or hagiography, of Saint Francis. The work earned him praise from literary reviewer Pericle Martinescu, according to whom Karnabatt had not just a "deep interior conviction", but also "the gift of storytelling", even though the volume itself was a work of "proselytism". Later reviewers were more severe: philosopher Horia-Roman Patapievici discussed the book as one of "vulgar and servile piety".

During the same year, Editura Vremea published a new selection of Karnabatt's poetry, including Crinul mistic ("Mystical Lily"), a number of "medieval odes", and his version of the Magnificat. This work of "Christian humility" saw print at the height of World War II, and, according to poet Ion Șiugariu, was "consolatory and empowering." According to the same author, its "childish candor" resembled the devotional poetry of Oscar Milosz and Vasile Voiculescu. In 1944, also at Editura Vremea, Karnabatt published his lat volume, the memoir Bohema de altădată ("Bohemia of Yesteryear").
