= Dem. Theodorescu =

Romanian journalist, humorist and critic (1888–1946)

Dem. (Demetru "Mitică") Theodorescu
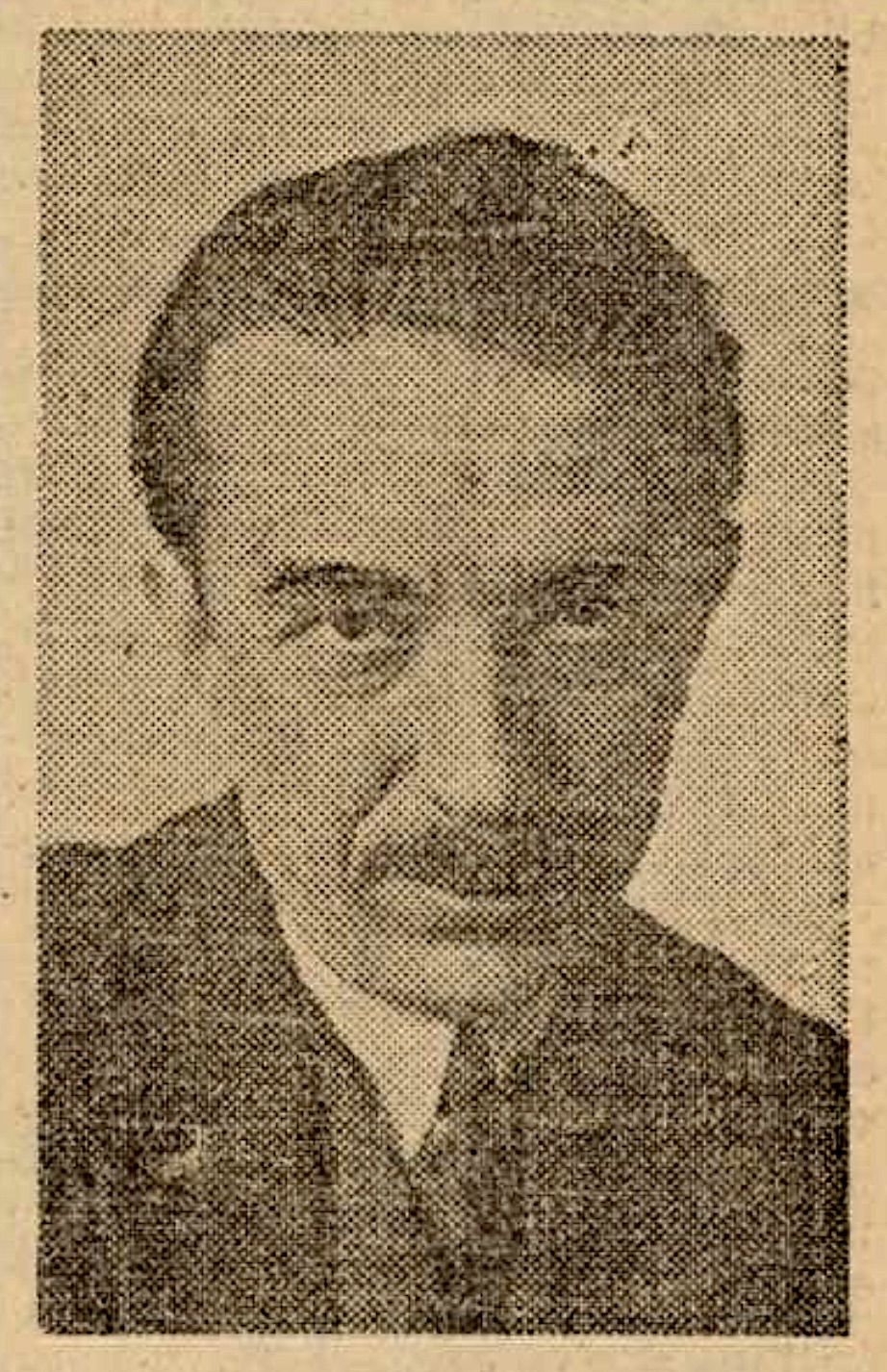
- Theodorescu in 1937
- Born: October 26, 1888; Roești, Vâlcea County
- Died: April 11, 1946 (aged 57)
- Occupations: journalist, critic, translator, radio propagandist
- Writing career
- Pen name: D.C.H., D.T., D. Chirca, Toader Chirca, Fidelio, D. Ghirca, Nae & Mitică, Ion Olteanu, Rastignac, Ravaillac, Ravaiac, Teo, Todry
- Period: ca. 1907–1954
- Genres: essay, political novel, satire, comedy, erotic literature
- Movements: avant-garde Contimporanul

Dem. Theodorescu (most common rendition of Demetru Theodorescu or Teodorescu, first name also Mitică; October 26, 1888 – April 11, 1946) was a Romanian journalist, humorist, and critic, remembered for his social-themed novels but also for his controversial political stances. A committed opponent of the National Liberal Party establishment, Theodorescu frequented the avant-garde and socialist circles. During World War I, he transformed himself into a supporter of the Central Powers, and lived the occupation of Romania as a collaborationist. Like his friend Tudor Arghezi, he was imprisoned on a verdict of treason, but pardoned in December 1920.

Returning to the literary and political press, gravitating between Contimporanul, Adevărul, and Cuvântul, Theodorescu radicalized his vision of public affairs. He came to support fascism, and publicly praised the Iron Guard movement before and during World War II. In late 1944, the return of multi-party rule led to his marginalization and public condemnation.

Theodorescu's work as a satirical novelist was generally considered an extension of his journalistic polemics, although various critics and historians also made a point of noting the author's literary skill. Comprising three standalone books, but tied together as a "Mischianu family" saga, it stirred controversy for its political undertones and, in some cases, for its frank eroticism.

== Biography ==
=== Early life ===
The son of Ion and Aurelia Theodorescu, the future writer hailed from the village of Roești, in Vâlcea County, where he was born on October 26, 1888 (some sources have 1889). A high school student in Craiova, he published poems and philosophical fragments in Ramuri. Between 1900 and 1910, Theodorescu began contributing to the daily press of Bucharest, using such aliases as D.T., D.C.H., D. Chirca and, later on, Todry, also enlisting at the University of Bucharest Faculty of Letters. He sent pieces to N. D. Cocea's socialist review, Facla, under the pen name Fidelio (used before him by the literary critic Ilarie Chendi). His literary debut was in humorous drama, with the one-act play Domnul Traian Traianescu-Laocoon ("Mr. Traian Traianescu-Laocoon", 1907).

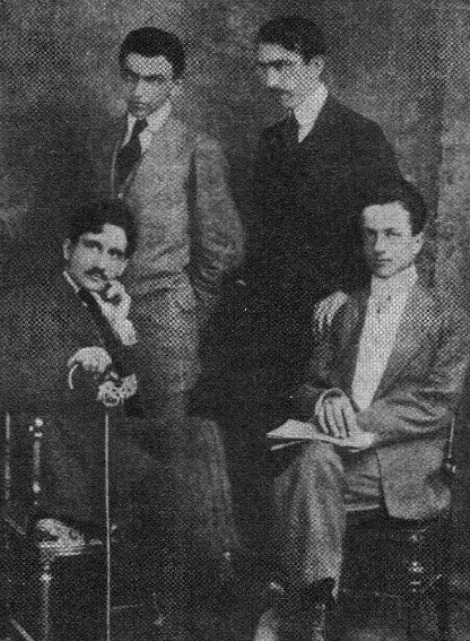
Constantin Beldie, Nae Ionescu, Theodorescu and Spiru Hasnaș, photographed as staff members for Noua Revistă Română (1912)

Around 1912, Theodorescu was a sympathizer of the Symbolist movement, the radical side. Alongside journalists Nae Ionescu and Constantin Beldie, he was employed by the literary and art magazine Insula, put out by poets Ion Minulescu and N. Davidescu. As assessed by literary historian Paul Cernat, Insula represented Symbolism "in revolt", "segregated" from cultural conservatism. Theodorescu and Ionescu wrote collectively or interchangeably on the same satirical column, as Nae & Mitică. Both had as main targets the iconic figures of traditionalism (Alexandru Vlahuță) or moderate aestheticism (Victor Eftimiu, Eugen Lovinescu, Cincinat Pavelescu). In tandem, Theodorescu was co-opted on the staff of Constantin Rădulescu-Motru's Noua Revistă Română, where he usually signed his contributions as Ravaillac, Ravaiac, and (presumably) Teo. He also signed with his name, covering topics such as the British railway strike.

=== World War I controversies ===
Theodorescu became more politically involved with the outbreak of World War I in 1914. During the early stages of the war, when Romania balanced her neutrality, Theodorescu was working as Chief Editor of the political daily Dreptatea, under patrons Nicolae Fleva and Pache Protopopescu. He pushed the newspaper into a position of full support for the Entente Powers, making use of strong anti-Germanic imagery: "Once you meet a German, wring his neck!" He urged Romania to enter the war on the Central Powers and annex Transylvania, while condemning the Germanophile politicians of the day—Alexandru Marghiloman, of the Conservative Party, was a canalie ("scoundrel"), and Ioan Slavici an "enemy of the national ideal".

During 1915, as the Central Powers gained the upper hand, Dreptatea slowly discarded the Ententist cause, and took a neutralist stance. Theodorescu returned with sarcastic comments on Ententists such as Octavian Goga and Take Ionescu, accused of having "sold" Romania to the Russian Empire. As Toader Chirca, Theodorescu was already contributing articles to Libertatea, the Germanophile sheet managed by Alexandru Bogdan-Pitești; in November 1915, he formalized this affiliation, and resigned from Dreptatea. At Libertatea, and subsequently at Cronica, he became colleagues with poet-journalist Tudor Arghezi, the only one among Libertatea contributors to have proved himself more prolific than Theodorescu, as well as with writers such as Adrian Maniu, Perpessicius, Dragoș Protopopescu, I. C. Vissarion, and Ion Vinea. In the essay Morala cea nouă, carried by Cronica in May 1916, Theodorescu opined that the German Empire was a model-civilization. In his view, the German order stood to conquer and subdue "rampant" individualism, thus turning the page on the ideals of the French Revolution.

Some three months later, a National Liberal government of Ion I. C. Brătianu announced Romania's affiliation to the Entente. This put a stop to Libertatea and Cronica, which went out of print immediately. The following moths were chaotic, leading to the invasion of Romania by the Central Powers; Bucharest fell after a month-long attack, but the legitimate government continued to resist the enemy in Moldavia. Others, including Theodorescu and various other Germanophiles, opted to remain in Bucharest. Gazeta Bucureștilor, the collaborationist daily put out by Slavici and Arghezi, enlisted Theodorescu, who contributed there mainly under the pseudonym Ion Olteanu.

Theodorescu was by then fully committed to the Central Powers and the puppet administration set up by Lupu Kostaki. In August 1917, during what was designed as the final German attack on Moldavia, Gazeta Bucureștilor carried his appeal Pedeapsa ("Punishment"). It presented the Germans as liberators, noting that "our true enemy" was the "hideous" political system set up by Take Ionescu and Brătianu. His articles turned against high society Francophilia (or Franțuzomania, "Frenchy-mania"), perceived as the real reason for war: "Those dames who spoke in French, they have for the large part created Romania's war."

Early in 1918, as the state authorities in Moldavia considered alternatives for peace with the Germans, the old Germanophile leader Marghiloman was awarded Premiership. There followed a transitional period, during which Marghiloman negotiated the Buftea Armistice. Although an old rival of Marghiloman's, Theodorescu found himself promoted Chief Editor of the Conservative daily, Steagul, for which he began reusing his old pen name, Fidelio. For a while, he was even relocated to Iași, the former seat of Brătianu's government, where he served as head of government censorship.

=== Imprisonment and return ===
This interregnum came to an abrupt end in November 1918, when the Armistice of Compiègne signaled a general defeat for the Central Powers. Marghiloman presented his resignation, leaving his former allies exposed to formal investigations for treason. As D. Ghirca, Theodorescu became staff writer for Pamfil Șeicaru's Țara Nouă, working alongside Cezar Petrescu, Victor Ion Popa, and Gib Mihăescu. This newspaper campaigned for an emergent left-wing group, the Peasants' Party, which channeled its efforts into defeating the "oligarchic" National Liberal establishment. He registered as a party member in or around February 1919.

In March of that year, Theodorescu, Arghezi, Slavici, Saniel Grossman and Dumitru Karnabatt were all taken into custody, pending trial. They stood accused of having placed themselves in direct service to the occupying power, for which Theodorescu received a five-year prison term. Theodorescu was also purged from the Romanian Writers' Society, based on the motion of its President, Mihail Dragomirescu. However, in 1920, Editura Socec published his debut as a satirical novelist: În cetatea idealului ("In City of the Ideal").

The sentenced journalists were held together in Văcărești Prison until December 1920, when they were officially pardoned by King Ferdinand. The monarch responded to pressures from a Transylvanian National and Peasantist government, which mainly saw the sentencing as a political squabble between the National Liberals and their adversaries. Theodorescu soon returned to his career in the press, with articles published in Cocea's Rampa and in the illustrated monthly Gloria României. Theodorescu was also hosted by Flacăra, a tribune of moderate Symbolism, where he published a critique of, his old rival Goga, whose work in poetry, he argued, had become too docile and mainstream. His return as a literary columnist was also consecrated by Adevărul daily, with a February 1922 review of Eugeniu Botez's stories. Theodrescu served as editor of both Adevărul and its supplement Dimineața.

In June 1922, Theodorescu's former Cronica associate, Vinea, issued the influential magazine Contimporanul. Later a tribune for the artistic avant-garde, it was at the time mainly a political venue with socialist and Peasantist leanings, as evidenced by its original list of contributors: Theodorescu, Arghezi, Eugen Filotti, Benjamin Fondane, Henric Streitman, Nicolae N. Lupu, Camil Petrescu. Theodorescu's earliest contribution to the paper was a defense of the Socialist-Communist Party, whose members, affiliates of the Comintern, faced prosecution for dissent (see Dealul Spirii Trial).

In 1924, Theodorescu joined the staff of Cuvântul Liber, Filotti's own newspaper, where he debuted with an article on a major social issue, that of knowledge workers and their payment. Also in 1924, he became co-editor of Titus Enacovici's Cuvântul daily, sharing responsibilities with his old friend Nae Ionescu, as well as with Octav Onicescu and Titus Devechi. The newspaper, which, in 1933, became a voice for the antisemitic far right, still styled itself "politically independent" outlet, employing members of the Jewish Romanian community. At Cuvântul Liber, Theodorescu embarked on a personal polemic with the far-right intellectual Nichifor Crainic, who, years later, still alleged that Theodorescu was merely "a hireling of the Jews".

Theodorescu stayed with Cuvântul after Șeicaru took over as publisher, but he also continued to write for the rival Adevărul. He solved this conflict of interest by switching to the pen name of Rastignac for his Cuvântul articles, which reputedly managed to confuse his own colleagues there. The Adevărul publishing venture put out Theodorescu's second novel, Sub flamura roșie ("Under the Red Banner"), in 1926. He was interviewed by novelist I. Valerian for a 1927 issue of his Viața Literară, detailing his previous work in the press.

=== Fascism ===
By the end of the 1920s, Theodorescu was becoming a political radical. His mounting dissatisfaction with the electoral mores of Romanian liberalism was given voice in a 1929 piece for Contimporanul, where he ridiculed the political marches of the opposition People's Party, as well as the indifference of governing National Liberals. He concluded, sarcastically: "Only those who are either Bolshevik or shameless will dare speak with the voters; an honest mind and a true Romanian spirit are well satisfied with the [notion of a] country. This is all the more true if you consider that the electoral corps is something local and petty, whereas 'the country' is something integral, that will only head for Bucharest if promised free food and drink." He was drifting nonetheless away from the modernist left-wing, as noted by Geo Bogza: "AVANT-GARDE! Why does the word frighten you so, Mr. Dem. Theodorescu? Its letters, when counted, are found to be only a quarter of the teeth you're missing."

In 1932, Theodorescu was still a contributor to the leftist press, with articles published in Progresul Social review. By the end of 1933, Ionescu and Theodorescu's sympathy for the fascist Iron Guard, which had just been outlawed by government, was cemented. In December, they produced a Cuvântul issue which hosted musings by Guard founder Corneliu Zelea Codreanu, concerning a supposed "Judeo-Masonic" plot against his movement, as well as homage pieces by both editors, deploring the fate of Guardsmen in police custody. In 1936, under contract with Alcaly Company, Theodorescu published his third and final novel, Robul ("The Slave"). That year, he signed a congratulatory telegram to the pro-fascist Stelian Popescu, editor of Universul daily, who had set himself the goal of eradicating Jews from the press. The Jewish writer Mihail Sebastian, his former employee at Cuvântul, claimed that, in private, Theodorescu was more conciliatory than Popescu. As quoted by Sebastian, Theodorescu declared himself deeply ashamed by the telegram signing, but concluded: "What can I do? That's life!"

Theodorescu sided with the new establishment after the arrival to power of the fascist National Christian Party, and then after the creation of a National Renaissance Front. According to Sebastian, Theodorescu was taking an active, if informal, part in censoring works by Jewish authors, including Sebastian's own comedies. His own Robul was translated in 1939 and published in New York City as One House Contains Us All.

Married to the actress Marioara Zimniceanu, Theodorescu was working on a translation of the Sardou–Moreau comedy Madame Sans-Gêne, which premiered at the National Theatre Bucharest, under the management of novelist Liviu Rebreanu. His text earned critical attention for having updated and adapted the original to Romanian street-language, with direct borrowings from Ion Luca Caragiale. His other works in the field were a free adaptation from Lope de Vega's comedies (Castiliana), and a version of Sardou's Fédora (1944). His work with Lope's text was controversial: Theodorescu took an exact translation by Alexandru Popescu-Telega and changed it as he had done with Madame Sans-Gêne, sparking a dispute between theater professionals, with Rebreanu as an arbiter.

During 1941, the National Renaissance Front having crumbled, the Iron Guard seized power, creating Romania a "National Legionary State". Theodorescu was employed as a Romanian Radio propagandist. According to Sebastian's diaries, he had "an unbearable style", with "the same phrases and epithets he used to serve three regimes, [...] now serving a fourth", and with "clownish" undertones. Theodorescu maintained official positions throughout most of World War II and the Ion Antonescu dictatorship, when Romania was allied to Nazi Germany. The Coup of August 1944 reversed this situation, and restored political pluralism. On October 16, following an investigation carried out by the Romanian Communist Party and the National Peasants' Party, Theodorescu was formally excluded from all professional journalistic bodies. This controversial purge also affected other journalists, many of whom had been active on the far right: Șeicaru, S. Popescu, Crainic, D. I. Cucu, and Romulus Dianu. The Writers' Society followed suit on November 9, expelling Theodorescu from its ranks for a second and final time. The marginalization process was interrupted by Theodorescu's death, which occurred on April 11, 1946. He left an unpublished novel inspired by theatrical life, Rita Rizu.

== Novels ==
Among his novelist colleagues, Rebreanu was fond of Theodorescu's work, citing it as one of the best accomplishments in the field. Reviewer Șerban Cioculescu, of Revista Fundațiilor Regale, noted that, although "the spawn of journalism", Theodorescu was "a committed writer, who knows how to neatly lay down the issues and then solve them courageously. [...] The objective manner is, in his view, rather stale. Hence, he despises it. He discards impersonal descriptions and the cold dispassion of the social novelist, who has a fear of taking sides." Other critics and literary historians were less impressed. George Călinescu, for instance, notes Theodorescu's works in passing, as "entirely journalistic chronicles". Octav Botez, literary columnist at Viața Românească, spoke of Theodorescu as "an astute social analyst", but not in fact "the sort of spirit who is endowed with the mysterious gift of creation."

În cetatea idealului was part of a family of political novels specifically dealing with the social and moral upheavals of the 1910s, standing alongside N. Davidescu's Conservator & Comp. , and Eugen Todie's Hîrdăul lui Satan ("Satan's Bucket"). In writing it, Theodorescu took revenge on his political opponents of World War I. As noted by culture critic Eugen Lovinescu, the book is seasoned with irony, which is "an admirable weapon when it comes to clashes of ideas", but "a dissolving factor in matters of creativity". Critic Ovid Crohmălniceanu also describes the narrative as "tiresome", with its "vulgarity and lampoonish overbidding." Contrarily, journalist Nicolae Carandino sees it as "one of the best Romanian novels".

At core, the novel is about the game of wits between two aristocratic women: Sofia Mihailidis, the Francophile, and Angèle Mischianu, her Germanophile rival. Francophile commitments appear to be a tool for the spoils system: Mihailidis pushes her lover, the demagogue Titi Niculcea, for the position of government minister. A plot twist occurs when Mihailidis opts to stay behind in occupied Bucharest, trying to convince Niculcea, by then a military officer, to desert with her. The secondary plots are more "lively", according to Lovinescu: "we only retain here the profile of one Gonciu [...], the unmissable, but also selfless, partaker in all high life events, an encyclopedic dictionary of all things scientific, a genealogist and heraldist, an arbiter of taste, who, late at night, after having participated in the most 'selective' reunions of the grand salons, unbeknown to all, sinks back into his distant mahala, by the Sfânta Vineri Cemetery, and into the home of his mother, a laundress".

Sub flamura roșie expands on the Mischianu saga, recounting events set to the backdrop of the general strike of 1920. As argued by Lovinescu, there is "visible progress", with almost no irony discernable in the narrator's voice. In the main plot, Vasile Stancu, the labor organizer and anticapitalist orator, is shot at by an erstwhile socialist admirer, Firina, whom Vasile has raped. The murder attempt is accidentally discovered by a high society houri, Roxana Mischianu, who is infatuated with Vasile and follows him in his missions abroad, while Firina, no longer in control of her actions, turns to political assassination. The socialist movement is half-compromised, with Stancu arrested upon his return to the country, then isolated in Văcărești Prison. He is made to defend himself in a lengthy trial which ends with his acquittal, but finds that Roxana has deserted both him and the cause.

Lovinescu describes the work as "interesting", with "a portraitist's vigor", but rejects the subplot, which focuses on renewed erotic clashes between the Mischianus and the Mihaildises. This, he argues, is the stuff of "licentious engravings", not literature. The same was noted by Botez. He finds the text to be "nervous and personal", with a "relentless verve" and "intelligent and judicious remarks" about socialist ideology; however, the erotic scenes seem to him "gross and obscene." Critic Constantin Șăineanu also gave a rather positive review to the narrative, praising Theodorescu for conjuring an "intense emotion" by means of the central love story. He also notes that, stylistically, Sub flamura roșie is a failure: "[Theodorescu] has made pointless efforts to pour in all sorts of adjectives and belabored expressions, with convoluted phrases, bizarre neologisms and with risky images and comparisons that defy common sense and wear out the most benevolent of his patient readers." As Crohmălniceanu notes, the "concupiscent" imagery adds a "sensationalist tint".

The book was especially unpopular among literary men affiliated with either the Social Democrats or the Romanian Communist Party. Socialismul newspaper complained that Theodorescu painted a grim picture of Romanian socialism, showing Stancu as bereft "of one's basic spiritual qualities". The communist party organ Cultura Proletară gave Sub flamura roșie a poor review, objecting to its depiction of socialist men undone by sheer erotic instinct. This perspective, the reviewers wrote, showed Theodorescu as a "petty bourgeois", unreceptive of revolutionary idealism, but "overly familiar with the world of horse-racing, hags, and prostitutes". Other figures on the left, such as Contimporanul editor Ion Vinea, contrarily cherished Theodorescu as an anti-bourgeois from the same ideological family as Vasile Demetrius or Panait Istrati. The former socialist Constantin Mille also admired the novel's "verve".

Robul is an attack on modern democracy, but, as Lovinescu argues, generally objective in tone—instead of editorial commentary, it satirizes by creating hardly credible situations. It thus shows influences from Arghezi's lampoons, and not to the "flowing style" of N. D. Cocea's novels. The eponymous "slave" is Nicolin, a starving war invalid who takes up the job of ghostwriting for the career politician Obogea. As a result, the profiteering Oblogea becomes a rising star, whereas Nicolin lives in anonymity, his only real friend a former prostitute, Margot; Elvira Obogea, the object of Nicolin's final passion, leaves him for the sporty Raul Mischianu. Again, the novel alludes to real events: the Great Depression, the Bucharest war invalids' march, and its violent repression. These events, Cioculescu notes, are poorly narrated, as are political and social themes (Theodorescu's depiction of the "sociogenic" mass and its passion for sports).
