= Dragoș Protopopescu =

Romanian writer, poet, critic and philosopher

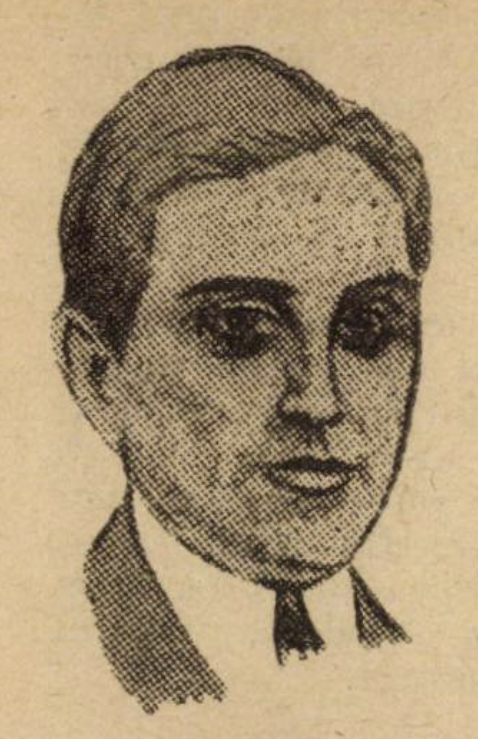
- Portrait of Dragoș Protopopescu by Ștefan Dimitrescu, 1926
- Born: October 17, 1892; Călărași, Kingdom of Romania
- Died: April 11, 1948 (aged 55); Bucharest, Romanian People's Republic
- Education: University of Bucharest; University of Paris; University College London
- Occupations: Writer, academic, politician
- Employer(s): Chernivtsi University; University of Bucharest
- Political party: Everything For the Country Party
- Movement: Iron Guard
- Spouses: Marioara Aldea (divorced) Alice Bădescu (divorced) Lia Romașcu (m. 1937–1939)

Dragoș Protopopescu (17 October 1892 – 11 April 1948) was a Romanian writer, poet, critic, philosopher, and far-right politician. He is considered by some to be greatest Anglicist from interwar Romania.

== Early life and education ==
Protopopescu was born in Călărași to Constantin Popescu and Octavia Blebea. After going to school in his native city, he pursued his studies at the Saint Sava High School in Bucharest, and then at the Faculty of Letters of the University of Bucharest.

In January 1920, he continued his education at the University of Paris. In March 1920, he enrolled at University College London to attend specialized courses, as part of his thesis requirements. His PhD thesis focused on the work of William Congreve, and was written under the direction of Louis Cazamian. The final thesis was published as Un Classique moderne, William Congreve. Sa vie. Son oeuvre, under the name "Dragosh Protopopesco", in April 1924.

== Literary career ==
In May 1920, Protopopescu published a volume of poetry, Poemele restriștei ("Poems of Restriction"), in Bucharest.

In September 1923, he published Unknown Congreve: a Sheaf of Poetical Scraps, a complimentary piece to his PhD thesis, through the "Cultura Națională" Publishing House in Bucharest. Later that year, he also published English-language poems by Congreve in The Observer and The Times Literary Supplement.

Protopopescu returned to Romania in May 1924. He was named "titular professor" at the University of Cernăuți in March 1925, where he taught a course titled "Caracterul de rasă al literaturii engleze" ("The racial character of English literature") within the Department of English Language and Literature. He published a volume titled Pagini engleze ("English Pages") later that year.

From 1926 to 1927 he was the director of the National Theater in Cernăuți, where he hired Grigore Vasiliu Birlic in his first role.

He returned to England in 1928, serving as the press attaché at the Romanian Legation in London (1928–1930). During this period, he also translated Shakespeare's Hamlet into Romanian, and began work on a volume titled Civilizația engleză ("English Civilization").

Protopopescu became professor at the University of Bucharest, and served as dean of the School of English Language and Literature in the Department of Letters at the university. Throughout the interwar period, he actively contributed to literary journals and right-wing newspapers such as Flacăra, Viața Nouă, Cuget Românesc, Cuvântul, Gândirea, Lumea Nouă, Cuvântul Studențesc, Vremea and Porunca Vremii. He served as editor of Nichifor Crainic's journal Calendarul beginning in 1932. In this period, he also published several works of fiction, including Iarmarocul metehnelor and Candidații la cantitate.

== Political career ==
Protopopescu was a member of the fascist and antisemitic organization known as the Iron Guard (or the Legionary Movement). In 1932, he was proposed as a Legionary leader in Botoșani, although he refused this position.

In December 1933, Protopopescu was arrested alongside other Legionary cultural figures, including Nae Ionescu, Nichifor Crainic, and Mihail Polihroniade. They were accused of being "moral authors" of the assassination of Prime Minister I.G. Duca, who had been shot dead in Sinaia by Legionnaires for attempting to suppress the Iron Guard. Protopopescu was imprisoned at Jilava Prison, but was released in March 1934 after intervention by Nicolae Titulescu, and returned to teaching and writing. In 1936, he published Fortul 13 ("Fort 13"), a novel based on his experiences at Jilava, which was widely advertised in both Iron Guard circles and the general press. Later that year, he published Fenomenul englez. Studii și interpretări ("The English Phenomenon. Studies and Interpretations.") through the publishing house of the Royal Foundation of Romania.

Beginning in 1937, he published the newspaper Buna Vestire, which, though not an official publication of the Iron Guard, was aligned with the organization and supported by its members. It was an explicitly ultra-nationalist and antisemitic newspaper. He also published a novel, Tigrii ("The Tigers"), which was heavily promoted in Buna Vestire. The newspaper was suspended in 1938 during the Royal Dictatorship of King Carol II and further crackdowns on the Iron Guard.

In the 1937 general election, Protopopescu ran on the list of the Everything For the Country Party ("Totul pentru Țară" party), the electoral front of the Iron Guard, in Botoșani and Roman, and was elected to the Chamber of Deputies.

== Later life and death ==
After the establishment of the fascist National Legionary State, Protopopescu replaced John Burbank as head of the English department at the University of Bucharest. Throughout the early 1940s, he published a large series of Shakespeare translations in Romanian (including King Lear, the Tempest, Coriolanus, the Two Gentlemen of Verona, the Winter's Tale, the Merry Wives of Windsor, the Taming of the Shrew, and Othello). He continued to teach at the University of Bucharest until June 1947.

In 1948, Protopopescu was arrested by the communist authorities. He attempted suicide by cutting his veins, and was sent to a hospital in Bucharest before being arrested again by the Securitate. He died by suicide after leaning over an elevator shaft and being decapitated by the cabin.

== Private life ==
He was married three times: first with Marioara Aldea, then with Alice Bădescu, and finally (between 1937 and 1939), with Lia Romașcu.

== Books ==
- Zvon de pretutindeni. București: Imprimeria "Independența". 1921. OCLC 43631255.
- Pagini engleze, București, Editura Cultura Națională, 1925
- Fenomenul englez: studii și interpretări, București, Fundația pentru Literatură și Artă "Regele Carol II", 1936 (re-edited 1996; 2003)
- Shakespeare: viața și opera, ediție îngrijită de Fabian Anton, București, Editura Eurosong & Book, 1998 OCLC 895652668
- Protopopescu, Dragoș; Bălu, Andi (2000). Shakespeare. Romanul englez (Ediție, studiu introductiv, note și traduceri ed.). București: Editura Albatros. ISBN 973-24-0775-1. OCLC 895074539.
