= Polihroniade =

Polihroniade is a surname. Notable people with the surname include:

- Elisabeta Polihroniade (1935–2016), Romanian chess player
- Mihail Polihroniade (1906–1939), Romanian historian and journalist
