= Constantin Beldie =

Romanian journalist, publicist and civil servant

Constantin Dumitru Beldie
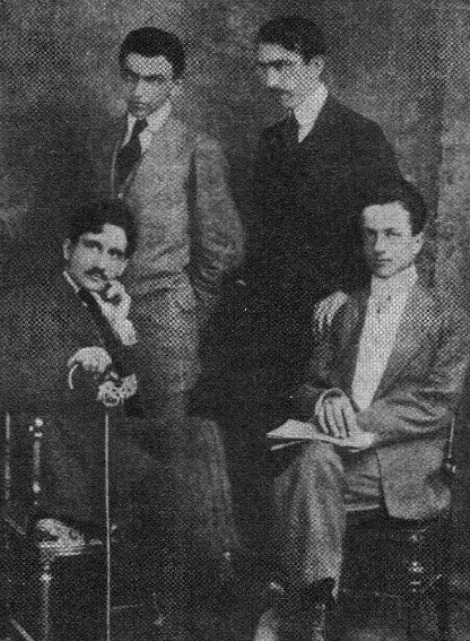
- From left: Beldie, Nae Ionescu, Dem. Theodorescu and Spiru Hasnaș, photographed as staff members for Noua Revistă Română (1912)
- Born: September 8, 1887; Bucharest, Kingdom of Romania
- Died: June 11, 1954 (aged 66); Bucharest, Communist Romania
- Occupations: journalist, translator, civil servant, schoolteacher
- Writing career
- Period: ca. 1908–1954
- Genres: memoir, essay, aphorism, satire
- Literary movement: Modernism; Trăirism

Signature
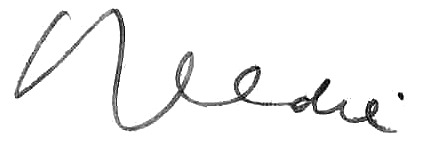

Constantin Dumitru Beldie (September 8, 1887 – June 11, 1954) was a Romanian journalist, publicist, and civil servant, famous for his libertine lifestyle and his unapologetic, sarcastic, memoirs of life in the early 20th century. After modest but happy beginnings in life, Beldie played a small but essential part in the promotion of literary modernism, building bridges between the mainstream and the avant-garde. He became a pioneer of cultural journalism at Noua Revistă Română, before moving on to Ideea Europeană and ultimately Cuvântul, befriending (and secretly resenting) philosopher-journalist Nae Ionescu. Like Ionescu, he promoted a vitalistic perspective on society and culture, veering into antiintellectualism after 1918.

While working in the field of journalism and cultural criticism, Beldie advanced through the ranks of the bureaucracy, and held several important assignments between 1919 and 1935. He was the lover of female journalist Cora Irineu, and was possibly responsible for her suicide in 1924. This was only one of his many philandering affairs, some of them discussed in Beldie's own recollections of the period. These politically charged manuscripts were published, with a noted delay, in 2000.

== Biography ==
=== Early years ===
Born in Bucharest, Beldie grew up in the mahala of Gorgani, just south of Cișmigiu Gardens. He was a second-generation Bucharester, with his paternal family stemming from the western province of Oltenia. On that side, he descended from an old line of pandur rebels, called Beldie, Băldan, or Pietraru. His great-grandfather Nicolae, Beldie recalled, participated in the 1821 uprising, only to betray the revolutionary cause, and then settled with other renegade pandurs on the Vâlsan River floodplain. His grandfather, Ghiță Beldie, resided in Stroeștii Argeșului, but traded in țuică all over the Argeș River valley.

Beldie's father, Dumitru, left the impoverished countryside for a life in the city; his father and brothers, however, were committed to the a peasant life, and benefited from the land reforms. Dumitru, a restaurant owner, was a sympathizer of socialism, acquainted with a number of prominent contemporary Romanians. Young Beldie received a progressive education, which even included enrollment in pre-kindergarten. He was later given private lessons in French, German and English, in addition to attending school, and took classes in dance and bicycling.

However, Beldie grew up mainly on the streets, describing life in the half-rural Bucharest of his youth as "patriarchal, lazy, prosperous and good-to-all". His summers were spent in the countryside, traveling with Ghiță Beldie on the trade route between Vâlsan region and Bucharest. He observed Westernization and urbanization as a bohemian outsider, commenting sarcastically on the universal spread of petty corruption and lassitude. Beldie went to the Saint Sava National College, followed by the Gheorghe Șincai Gymnasium. His time in school was an annoyance, and he twice failed to get his remove, passing his finishing exams in private. He would later complain of the corporal punishments he received in class, and that Saint Sava "did not teach us anything, did not urge us to accomplish anything".

Beldie took a break from schooling, and worked various odd jobs, notably as a clerk in a medical laboratory, a choir singer for the Metropolitan Church, and a village teacher. One of Constantin Rădulescu-Motru's closest collaborators, in 1908 he became a secretary at the latter's magazine Noua Revistă Română, remaining there until 1916. This period introduced Beldie to the Europeanist ideology of Rădulescu-Motru and Ion Trivale, who criticized the nationalist stances of schools such as Poporanism and Sămănătorul; Rădulescu-Motru struck Beldie as "wise" and "kind", but too pedantic when it came to assessing art. He also quickly learned the editing and typographical trades, as well as the administrative tasks involved in preparing a magazine.

=== Debut in cultural journalism ===
Soon, Beldie became a close observer of the day's literary and scientific milieu, reviewing the correspondence exchanged between Noua Revistă Română and Filippo Tommaso Marinetti. As a literary chronicler and LTTE recipient, he helped discover writers such as Tudor Arghezi, George Bacovia, and Felix Aderca. He personally intervened to have Aderca's poems published in Noua Revistă Română (1913), but was much annoyed by Aderca's "contentious and categorical" nature. Allegedly, Beldie also met the literary innovator and prankster Urmuz. Beldie also worked on and off as a translator of French literature for Alcaly Publishers, whose Jewish Romanian owner, he recalled, was utterly illiterate. He became passionate about J. Barbey d'Aurevilly, Charles Baudelaire, Anatole France, Remy de Gourmont, Jean Moréas, Jean Richepin, and Auguste Villiers de l'Isle-Adam. In 1915, he translated and prefaced Villiers' Le secret de l'échafaud.

With such professional credentials, Beldie was asked to contribute on other publishing projects, and became close to the burgeoning Symbolist movement. He met and befriended, or quarreled with, a host of Symbolists and post-Symbolists, leaving characterological notes on Adrian Maniu, N. Davidescu, Emil Isac, and Mihail Sorbul. Together with I. Dragoslav, he was one of the non-Symbolists involved with Ion Minulescu's Symbolist tribune, Insula. Like the younger Symbolists, Beldie also took a keen interest in avant-garde aesthetics. He claimed to have played a personal part in bringing Expressionism to Romania, but was perplexed by Cubism, and declared himself unconvinced by Marinetti's Futurism. He not only disliked Futurism, but contended that its promoters at Noua Revistă Română, including Ramiro Ortiz, were Italian proto-fascist nationalists and agents of influence.

Another one of his new friends was Nae Ionescu, with whom he would quarrel and reunite several times before 1940. According to Beldie's own testimony, they were both intrepid womanizers and self-seekers. Ionescu, Beldie claims, was "not taken seriously" as an author, mainly because "he wouldn't take himself seriously". The "Gypsy-like knave" Ionescu was, according to Beldie, "a loser before it was his time to lose". Joining their circle were Aderca and Maniu. Both of them, Beldie claims, squandered their talent on artistically irrelevant, lucrative, work.

Beldie himself was notorious for his hedonism, later confessing: "I have been a philanderer by nature all my life, but I was not a jealous one." He also admitted having been a confidant of women, "their comrade and blood-brother", and of thus receiving their sexual favors, but also claimed to have participated in at least one public sex orgy. He was a long-haired dandy with "languid eyes", taking special care in his appearance, which included such fashionable items as a Panama or a bowler hat, celluloid collar, a frock coat, nacre buttons, and a walking cane.

Despite his libertine outlook, on July 29, 1910, Beldie married the actress Eugenia Gh. Ionescu, with whom he lived on Schitul Maicilor Street, Bucharest. On August 29, 1912, Eugenia gave birth to a son, Alexandru "Puiu" Beldie. This did not prevent Beldie from pursuing other women. Enrolling at the University of Bucharest Faculty of Philosophy and Literature, he met Cora Irineu, who became passionately in love with him, and whom Beldie helped introduce to literary life. Eventually graduating in 1912, Beldie was drafted into the Romanian Land Forces during the Second Balkan War. He was a teacher from 1913 to 1947 in the fields of Romanian language, professional education and project management.

=== Essayist and civil servant ===
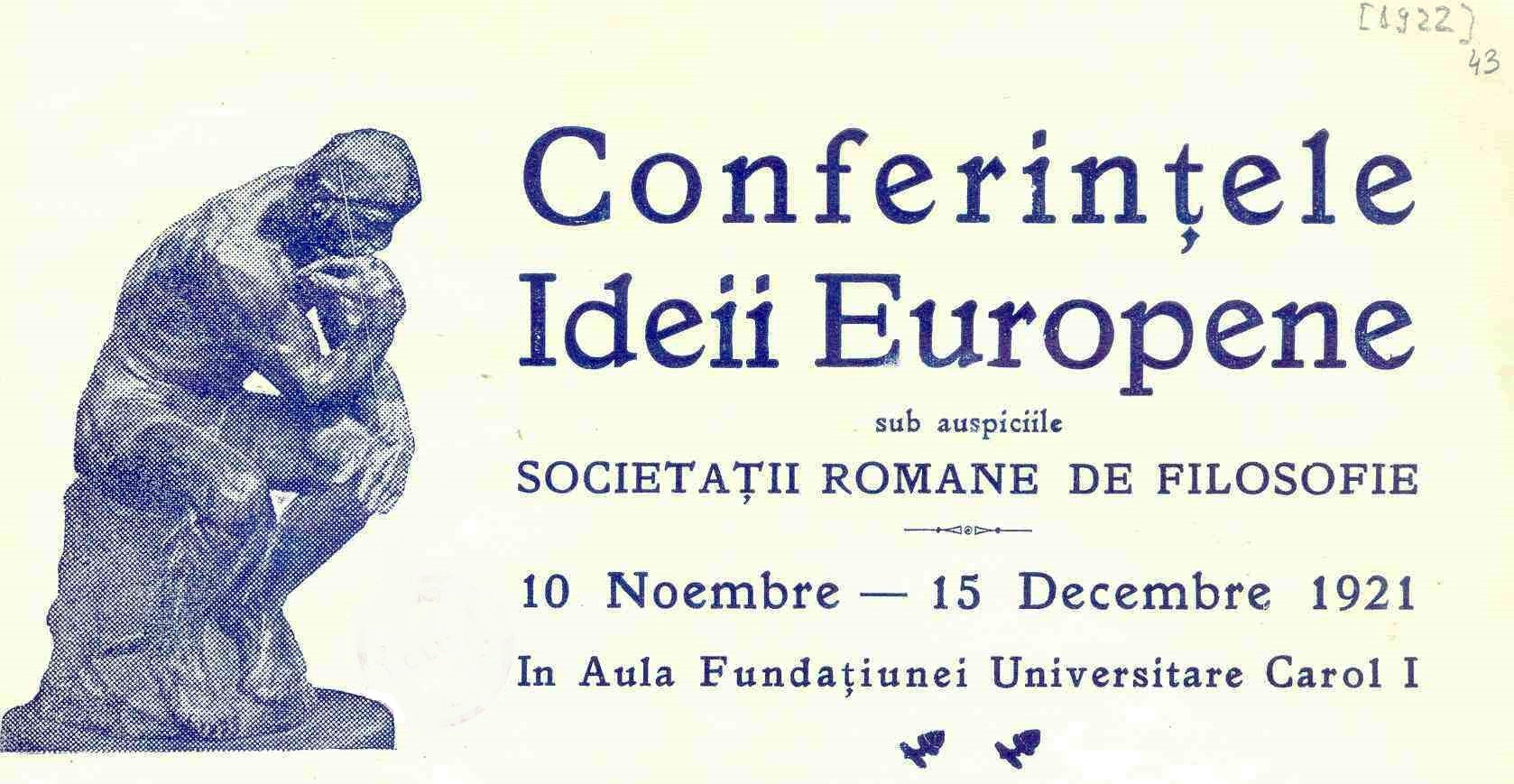
Letterhead announcing the Ideea Europeană Conference of November 1921. From the invitation addressed by Beldie to poet Emil Isac

Beldie was again drafted into the Land Forces for the World War I Romanian campaign (1916-1918). During this time, his dislike of formalism had matured into vitalism and antiintellectualism. As Beldie later put it, the Romanian intellectual class had the artistic tastes of "prostitutes", being virtually incapable of producing "an original idea of its own". The youth, given to the "drunkenness twinned with whoring", would only read the football pages of Gazeta Sporturilor. Its "intellectual and moral crisis", Beldie claimed, had to do with "organic weakness", "exotic" intellectual habits, but also with "an insufficient training or an all-too-early lassitude".

The ideological stance fueled Beldie's 1918 essay Glossa spiritului cărturăresc ("Gloss on the Bookish Spirit") as well as, attributively, the aphorisms published as Ce vrem? Catechism pentru suflete nehotărîte ("What Is It We Want? A Catechism for Indecisive Souls"). Both were came out with Yellow Books (Cărți Galbene), an imprint of Editura Minerva, and were seen by reviewers of the day as illustrating "a heroic concept of life". According to critic Gheorghe Grigurcu, Beldie should be regarded as an immediate but "modest" precursor for Nae Ionescu's own brand of philosophic vitalism, or Trăirism. To contemporary readers, he appeared more like an inconsistent follower of pragmatism, in the vein of William James.

Instead of intellectualism, Beldie proposed a new brand of elitism and, historian Adrian Majuru notes, saw his as "a solitary life among the idiots". In Catechism, Beldie declared that: "There is no greater misfortune than when the strongest people on earth are not also the most obeyed by mankind. Because then all things are false, monstrous, and everything runs backwards." He advised youth not to be ashamed of "their weaknesses, their tics, and their passions", suggesting that "they provide one's life with color, freshness, and the picturesque."

In 1919, Beldie became editorial secretary at another of Rădulescu-Motru's magazines, Ideea Europeană, which took over the old offices of Noua Revistă Română. This allowed him to organize a series of conferences held in various cities by, among others, Nae Ionescu, Ortiz, Irineu, Octav Onicescu, Mircea Florian, Virgil Bărbat, and Emanoil Bucuța. At the time, he became close friends with another Ideea Europeană contributor, the Jewish essayist Henric Sanielevici. Beldie was not especially visible in this company of intellectuals, but contributed a rather popular satirical column, Aplauze și fluierături ("Applause and Heckling"), and put to bed each printed issue. As reported by Ionescu's disciple Mircea Vulcănescu, Beldie was the magazine's "actual soul", "intrepid" despite a noticeable physical handicap—Beldie now walked with a limp, and was known to Vulcănescu and others as "The Devil upon Two Sticks".

Beldie began an affair with Irineu, leaving with her on official assignments to Transylvania. To the irritation of his Ideea Europeană friends, these trips turned into sexual escapades, with both Beldie and Irineu neglecting their real tasks. In 1922, Irineu left alone for an extended trip in Banat area, while Beldie stated behind in Bucharest. The letters he received from her convinced him that she was an outstanding reporter, and, on this basis, he pruned their content and published them as a separate column in Ideea Europeană. From around 1919, Beldie was also working as a teacher at the Superior School for Arts and Crafts, in Bucharest. Having served as department head for the Social Reform Society (1919–1924), under sociologist Dimitrie Gusti, he was at the time a commercial director at Centrala Cărții publishing house and director of Editura Cultura Națională (1924–1928). While at Cultura Națională, he arranged Irineu's letters for publishing as a volume. As Beldie later recounted, this assignment pitied him against Nae Ionescu: according to Beldie, Ionescu was responsible for a major fraud, which he tried to pin down on Centrala Cărții. This account is contrasted by Vulcănescu. Though he notes that Ionescu had indeed defrauded his sponsor Aristide Blank, Vulcănescu argues that he did so only to benefit Beldie, who was having financial troubles.

=== Final decades ===
On February 11, 1924, Irineu committed suicide by revolver. This was due either to Beldie's philandering (which probably caused some of his other lovers to kill themselves) or, as he asserts in his memoirs, a family illness that also claimed several of her siblings. Another version has it that she was driven to despair when Beldie intervened between her and her other admirer, Bucuța. Beldie arranged for her burial at Bellu cemetery, and put out a final version of her letters and essays.

With Rădulescu-Motru, Beldie frequented the salon of Alexandrina Cantacuzino. They joined her Union of Intellectuals club in 1926, but Beldie left sarcastic notes about the intellectual abilities of its other members. Ideea Europeană ceased publication in 1928. That year, Beldie became director of Cuvântul daily, headed by Ionescu—who, in 1930, joined the camarilla surrounding the authoritarian King, Carol II. Beldie himself became head of Imprimeria Națională (1930–1932), before becoming assistant director and then director for the census (1930–1932), in which capacity he was well paid. Vulcănescu reports that Beldie, seen as an infirm, was the subject of pranks by his colleagues, including Henri H. Stahl and Vulcănescu himself: they exacerbated a conflict between Beldie and demographer Mitu Georgescu, to the point where it seemed like the two would duel.

Also according to Vulcănescu, Nae Ionescu still cared for Beldie, and possibly saw the pranks pulled on him as distasteful. In 1933, Ionescu defected to the Iron Guard, a fascist movement opposed to Carol II. As documented by Beldie, his wealth grew over the coming years, as he became the representative of Nazi-linked IG Farben in Romania, and included villas in Băneasa and Balcic and a Mercedes-Benz car with a chauffeur paid by the firm. Beldie, instead, retired from public life. He was embittered by Ionescu's politics, describing him as a "ham actor" on the far-right and religious scene, a figure of "turpitude, cynicism, amorality".

Beldie ended his career in the public service as head of Loteria de Stat (1932–1935). During World War II and the early years of the Romanian communist regime, Beldie lived in relative obscurity. From his retirement at age sixty until his death, he had financial difficulties and had to work as a proofreader for various publishers, eventually being forced to sell his personal book collection. During the early 1950s, Beldie began compiling and reviewing his scattered memoirs, in samizdat form. He only gave private readings, and was hailed by critic Vladimir Streinu, who attended such events, as Romania's answer to Saint-Simon. To minimize the risk of communist arrest and imprisonment, Beldie only dealt with the more distant past, with the notable exception of his chapter on Arghezi. This portion, which was not read in front of Arghezi, claimed that Arghezi was a compulsive liar, and discussed in detail the issue of his uncertain family origins.

Beldie was supported morally and financially by old literary friends, including Arghezi and literary critic Tudor Vianu, who greatly enjoyed reading fragments from the work. He visited the house of another literary promoter, Șerban Cioculescu, his portrait picture prominently displayed in the lobby. Working clandestinely and under Securitate surveillance, Cioculescu collected memoirs of the previous regime; he organized reunions at which Beldie met other such late debutants, including politician Petre Ghiață and former counterespionage operative George "Geacă" Borneanu.

Beldie was survived by his son Alexandru, whom he had educated in accordance with Glossa spiritului cărturăresc, encouraging him to take up mountaineering. Beldie Jr became a distinguished dendrologist, forestry engineer, and environmentalist. Like his father before him, he was also a bohemian. He fought on the Eastern Front and spent 1944-1945 as a prisoner of war in Oranki, before returning to teach in Romania. He was married three times, but had no children.

== Legacy ==
Beldie looked forward to the promise of liberalization, believing that his bitter memoirs would eventually be given imprimatur by the communist authorities. He was worried that they would never be published in full, so he asked his literary friends, including Arghezi, Vianu, Cioculescu, and Perpessicius, to make sure no part of them went missing. Alexandru Beldie, underpromoted in his field of work because of his anticommunism and structural nonconformity, then forcefully retired, took up the task of raising awareness of his father's samizdat work. He preserved the manuscripts and, in the 1970s, presented them to Zigu Ornea, director of Editura Minerva. Although Ornea gave his approval, the memoirs were blocked from publication by communist censors, due to a chapter on Nae Ionescu. Despite the chapter's sharply critical tone, the regime's policy was not to publish any mention of Ionescu. After the 1989 Revolution, Ornea and Nicolae Manolescu arranged for the Ionescu chapter to be published in România Literară.

The work only appeared in 2000, with Editura Albatros. As critics note, they were only printed in an altered form—with the Ionescu chapter conspicuously absent, probably cut out from the manuscript entirely. According to Ornea, this may be because Ionescu disciple Dan Zamfirescu, who reviewed the manuscripts for publishing at his own Editura Roza Vânturilor, wanted them lost. In 2005, however, Zamfirescu published Oameni văzuți de aproape ("People Seen from Up Close"), which reputedly covers the previously abridged part of Beldie's memoirs, and features notes that often challenge Beldie's account.

Alexandru Beldie died on June 4, 2003, some 3 years after the original book saw print, in what his colleagues describe as undeserved anonymity. Constantin's memoirs were enjoying the attention of literary critics, including Dan C. Mihăilescu, who reviewed them together with a mass of recovered samizdats.
