= Horia Stamatu =

Romanian poet and essayist

Horia Stamatu (September 9, 1912 – July 7/8, 1989) was a Romanian poet, essayist, and far-right politician.

== Biography ==
Born in Vălenii de Munte, where he attended primary school, Stamatu went on to military high school and then the literature and philosophy faculty of the University of Bucharest. From 1936 to 1937, he was a substitute teacher at Bucharest's Cantemir Vodă High School. He was amongst the editors of Enciclopedia României from 1938 to 1940, and served as an editor for the far-right newspaper Buna Vestire.

A member of the fascist Iron Guard, he took part in the Legionnaires' rebellion. In 1941, in the aftermath of the rebellion, he left for Germany through Bulgaria, and was interned at Buchenwald concentration camp with other members of the Iron Guard from 1942 to 1944. After 1944, upon the establishment of an Iron Guard government-in-exile in Vienna, he was involved in propaganda broadcasts through Radio Donau. He was sentenced to death in absentia by a Romanian military tribunal. From 1945, he lived in Freiburg im Breisgau, where he studied philosophy with Max Müller at the University of Freiburg. Within that institution, he lectured on the Romanian language from 1946 to 1948 in Hugo Friedrich's department.

From 1948 to 1950, he lived in Paris. There, he was among the founders of the Sorbonne-affiliated Romanian research institute; other initiators included Eugène Ionesco, Emil Cioran, Mircea Eliade, Edmond Jaloux, and Marcel Brion. Stamatu became head of the literary section. From 1951 to 1961, he lived in Spain, where he was an editor at Oriente Europeo magazine and co-founded Libertatea românească and Fapta magazines. He returned to Freiburg in 1961, living there until his death. From 1962 to 1966, he edited Forschungsstelle für Weltzivilisation. While in exile, he contributed to Revista scriitorilor români, Limite and Ethos.

Stamatu's first published work appeared in 1932 in Sandu Tudor's Floarea de foc magazine, and subsequently wrote for Ideea europeană magazine. His first book, the 1934 Memnon, appeared just as Ionesco, Cioran, and Ștefan Baciu were launching their careers. He won the Fundația Regală pentru Literatură și Artă prize. Until going into exile, Stamatu published several lengthy poems, such as Moartea lui 1940, in magazines, but no other books. While in Europe, he published Recitativ (1963), Kairos (1974), and Imperiul (1981). He won the American-Romanian Academy of Arts and Sciences prize for 1988.
