= Buna Vestire =

Romanian far-right newspaper (1937–1938, 1940–1941)

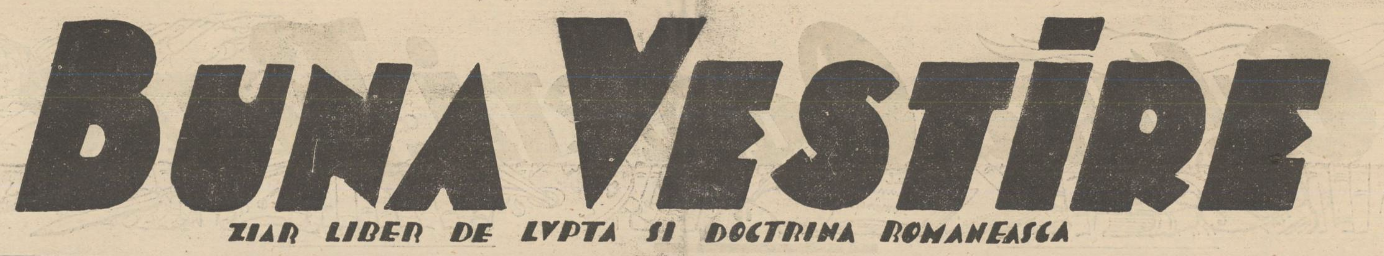
- Masthead, 1937–1938
- Type: Daily newspaper
- Founder(s): Dragoș Protopopescu, Toma Vlădescu (1937—1938); Grigore Manoilescu, Alexandru Constant (1940—1941)
- Editor-in-chief: Mihail Polihroniade
- Founded: February 1937
- Ceased publication: April 1938; January 1941
- Relaunched: December 1940
- Political alignment: Far-right, Legionarism
- Headquarters: Bucharest, Romania

Buna Vestire (English: "The Annunciation") was a far-right Romanian newspaper affiliated with, and later published by, the Iron Guard.

It was published daily from 1937 to 1938, and again under the National Legionary State in 1940–1941. It ceased publication in January 1941, following the Legionnaire's rebellion.

In 1940-1941 it was accompanied by a weekend supplement aimed at women, Bunavestire de Duminică ("The Sunday Annunciation").

== History ==
=== First run, 1937—1938 ===
Buna Vestire began publication on 23 February 1937 under the directorship of Dragoș Protopopescu and Toma Vlădescu. Its editor-in-chief was the Legionnaire Mihail Polihroniade. Both directors had been writers for Calendarul, a nationalist newspaper edited by Nichifor Crainic, and moved towards the Iron Guard under Crainic's influence.

Buna Vestire was published in Bucharest with the subtitle "Free newspaper of Romanian struggle and doctrine" ("Ziar liber de luptă și doctrină românească") and took an explicitly antisemitic, ultra-nationalist stance.

Although the newspaper was staunchly pro-Legionary, it was not initially published by the Iron Guard itself. In response to an article criticizing former Prime Minister Iuliu Maniu, Iron Guard leader Corneliu Zelea Codreanu was prompted to issue a circular explaining to his followers that:

"This newspaper is not Legionary. It is friendly and we support it. However, we would not like the views of the paper to be confused with the views of the Legionary Movement. Thus: read the newspaper, support it with love, but be on guard, because naturally not everything that is written there corresponds to the Legionary line."

Buna Vestire was funded primarily by Mihail Manoilescu, a sympathizer of the Iron Guard who would later serve as Foreign Minister of Romania in mid-1940. Manoilescu had run as a representative of the Iron Guard's electoral front, Totul pentru Țară ("Everything for the country") in the 1937 elections. His younger brother, Grigore (who would direct the paper's second run), was also a Legionnaire. In addition, director Dragoș Protopopescu was a member of the Iron Guard and had been imprisoned with other Legionnaires at Jilava Prison in the aftermath of the assassination of Prime Minister I.G. Duca in 1933. Due to political differences, Toma Vlădescu resigned from the directorship in December 1937.

Contributors and editors for Buna Vestire included the Legionnaires Radu Gyr, Neculai (or Nicolae) Totu, Bănică Dobre, Horia Stamatu, Valeriu Cârdu, Gheorghe Cantacuzino-Grănicerul, Virgil Rădulescu, Alexandru Christian Tell, and the right-wing journalist Sextil Pușcariu.

The newspaper regularly published declarations by Corneliu Zelea Codreanu and exclusive articles about the activities of the Iron Guard, alongside antisemitic polemic, cultural and sports news, and reports about nationalist movements in Europe. Its first issue was devoted to commemorating the Iron Guard martyrs Ion Moța and Vasile Marin, who had been killed in the Spanish Civil War the preceding month.

The newspaper ceased publication in April 1938; the same month, Corneliu Zelea Codreanu was arrested. The Iron Guard, which had been banned intermittently, was again declared an illegal organization, and Zelea Codreanu was assassinated in November 1938. The vast majority of the paper's editorial board (Nicolae Totu, Bănică Dobre, Virgil Rădulescu, Mihail Polihroniade, Alexandru C. Tell) were killed at Râmnicu Sărat Prison in September 1939.

=== Second run, 1940—1941 ===
In September 1940, the Iron Guard (now under the leadership of Horia Sima) came to power alongside Ion Antonescu, as the National Legionary State. Buna Vestire began its second publication run on 8 September 1940, under the directorship of Grigore(l) Manoilescu, Mihail's brother. During this second run, it became an official newspaper of the Iron Guard, with the subtitle "Ziar al Mișcării Legionare" ("Newspaper of the Legionary Movement").

Buna Vestire was supplemented by a Sunday illustrated magazine, Bunavestire de Duminică ("The Sunday Annunciation"). Primarily aimed at women, the supplement included news articles, cultural articles (mostly about fashion, film, and celebrities), and a humour section. It was published in eight issues, between 1 December 1940 and 19 January 1941.

Following the Legionnaire's rebellion of 21 January 1941, the Iron Guard was removed from power and Buna Vestire again ceased publication.
