= Gazeta Bucureștilor =

Romanian newspaper

Gazeta Bucureștilor was a Romanian version of the German newspaper Bukarester Tagblatt, published in Bucharest, Kingdom of Romania.

Harboring strongly pro-German sympathies, it was established in December 1916, and published until November 1918.

The German version had been published since 1880 with six issues per week. While the Romanian version was also published, the German version had the mention Kriegsausgabe unter der deutschen Besetzung ("War Edition under the German Occupation").

Its editorial offices were in Sărindari Street (present-day Constantin Mille Street).

Ioan Slavici, Tudor Arghezi, Dumitru Karnabatt, Dem. Theodorescu, Adolf de Herz, M. Sărăţeanu and Saniel Grossman-Tăutu were later given prison terms for publishing in the paper, being accused of "treason and collaborationism". They were released before time, after Nicolae Iorga, among others, strongly pushed for it.
