= Mihail Polihroniade =

Romanian historian and journalist

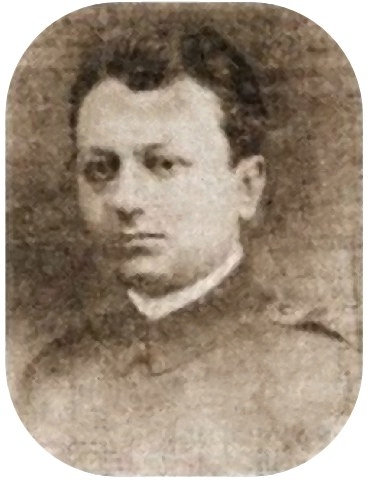
Mihail Polihroniade

Mihail Polihroniade (September 17, 1906 – September 22–23, 1939) was a Romanian historian, journalist and friend of Mircea Eliade.

Born in Brăila, into a family of Greek origin, he graduated from the law faculty of the University of Bucharest and worked as a lawyer. Initially a communist sympathizer, he later embraced the far right and joined the Iron Guard. In the press, he contributed ideological articles as well as commentary on foreign events. Together with Petru Comarnescu, Ionel Jianu, and Constantin Noica, he published Acțiune și reacțiune magazine from 1929 to 1930; Axa appeared under his guidance in 1933. He was editing secretary from Vremea, editor at Buna Vestire, and wrote for numerous publications, among them Politica, Ultima oră, Cuvântul, Gândirea, Universul literar, Tiparnița literară, Azi, Cuvântul Argeșului, Cuvântul studențesc, Calendarul, Sânziana and Iconar. He belonged to the circle surrounding Criterion magazine. Together with Alexandru-Christian Tell, he published Domnia lui Carol I in 1937. He also authored the pamphlet Tineretul și politica externă (1937; re-edited 1940). His study "Viața politică a României sub Carol I" appeared in volume I of Enciclopedia României (1938). He was killed in Râmnicu Sărat Prison as part of the reprisals for the assassination of Armand Călinescu.
