= Nae Ionescu =

Romanian philosopher, logician, mathematician, professor and journalist

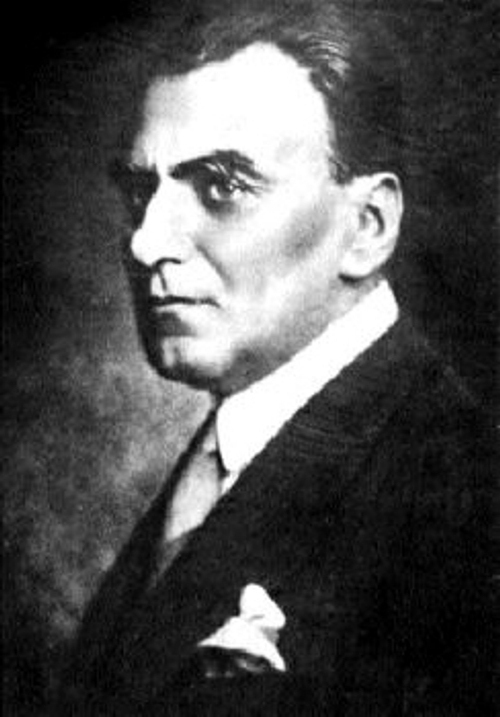
- Born: Nicolae C. Ionescu; June 16, 1890; Brăila, Kingdom of Romania
- Died: March 15, 1940 (aged 49); Bucharest, Kingdom of Romania
- Occupations: Philosopher, journalist
- Spouse: Elena Margareta Fotino
- Partner: Cella Delavrancea
- Children: 2

Academic background
- Education: University of Bucharest; University of Göttingen; Ludwig-Maximilians-Universität München
- Thesis: Die Logistik als Versuch einer neuen Begründung der Mathematik (1919)

Academic work
- Institutions: University of Bucharest
- Notable students: Haig Acterian, Emil Cioran, Jeni Acterian, Mircea Eliade, Constantin Noica, Mihail Sebastian, Petre Țuțea, and Mircea Vulcănescu
- Notable ideas: Trăirism

Nae Ionescu (Romanian: [ˈna.e joˈnesku], born Nicolae C. Ionescu; 16 June [O.S. 4 June] 1890 – 15 March 1940) was a Romanian philosopher, logician, mathematician, professor, and journalist.

== Life ==
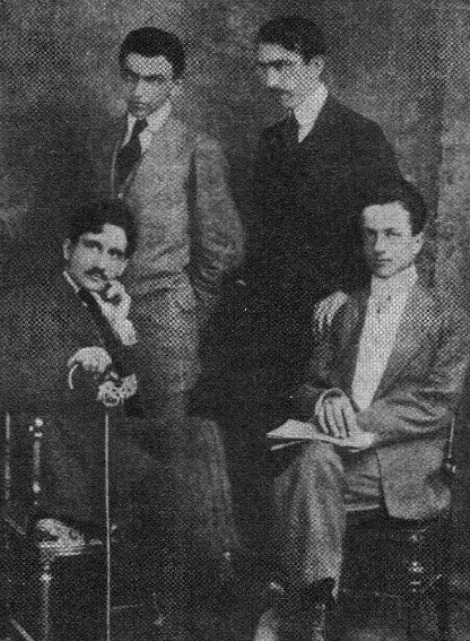
Ionescu (second from left) with Constantin Beldie, Dem. Theodorescu, and Spiru Hasnaș, photographed as staff members for Noua Revistă Română (1912)

Born in Brăila, Ionescu studied Letters at the University of Bucharest until 1912. Upon graduation, he was appointed teacher at the Matei Basarab High School in Bucharest. When World War I began, he traveled to Germany for additional studies at the University of Göttingen. Romania's entry into the war on the Entente side prevented him from returning, but he was awarded a doctorate in philosophy in 1919 from the Ludwig-Maximilians-Universität München. His thesis was entitled Die Logistik als Versuch einer neuen Begründung der Mathematik (Formal logic as an attempt at a new foundation of mathematics).

Back in Romania, after another brief stint teaching, Ionescu was appointed assistant to Constantin Rădulescu-Motru at the University of Bucharest's department of Logic and Theory of Knowledge.

His life's work had a profound effect on a generation of Romanian thinkers, first for his studies on comparative religion, philosophy, and mysticism, but later for his nationalist and far-right sentiment. Some of the figures he influenced include Haig Acterian, Emil Cioran, Jeni Acterian, Mircea Eliade, Constantin Noica, Mihail Sebastian, Petre Țuțea, and Mircea Vulcănescu. The existentialist and partly mystical school of thought Ionescu introduced bore the name Trăirism. Trăirism intersected at several points with the ideology of the Iron Guard; the connection became even more direct when many of its adherents also publicly associated with the latter.

Ionescu himself was more reserved in his dealings with the Guard. He was the editor of the highly influential newspaper Cuvântul, which had long backed King Carol II – the major rival of the Guard. However, Ionescu moved away from the monarchy due to Carol's inner circle. Ionescu's antisemitism was a decisive factor in his switching of allegiances: Jewish writer Mihail Sebastian's Journal depicts the interval during which Ionescu's virulence grew, as well as the reasons that were animating his large following.

He was the mentor of a generation of extremist and anti-Semitic students.

=== Mihail Sebastian incident ===
During the period when Sebastian and Ionescu were still on speaking terms, the latter had agreed to write the preface of Sebastian's book De două mii de ani... ("For two thousand years..."). Ionescu's introduction shocked Sebastian, who "loved and admired Ionescu", as it included several overtly antisemitic statements. Mircea Eliade recalls the incident in his autobiography:

"Judah suffers because it must suffer," Nae had written. And he explained why: the Jews had refused to acknowledge Jesus Christ as their Messiah. This suffering in history reflected, in a certain sense, the destiny of the Hebrew people who, precisely because they had rejected Christianity, could not be saved. Extra Ecclesiam nulla salus.

Eliade notes that this incident marked a profound departure for Ionescu, who in the late 1920s had suggested to Eliade, who was then his student, that he had been tempted "to give up both journalism and politics and devote myself entirely to Hebraic studies". Sebastian, though dejected by the incident, opted to keep Ionescu's introduction in the book.

=== Later life ===
After Carol's crackdown on the Iron Guard, Nae Ionescu and his disciples were rounded up and imprisoned at a makeshift camp in Miercurea-Ciuc. The experience took a toll on his fragile health, and he died soon thereafter, at age 49. Some close sources indicated that he was assassinated by poisoning due to his involvement with the Iron Guard. He was buried at Bellu Cemetery in Bucharest; his coffin was carried by some of his disciples, including Mircea Eliade.

=== Nae Ionescu's villa in Băneasa ===
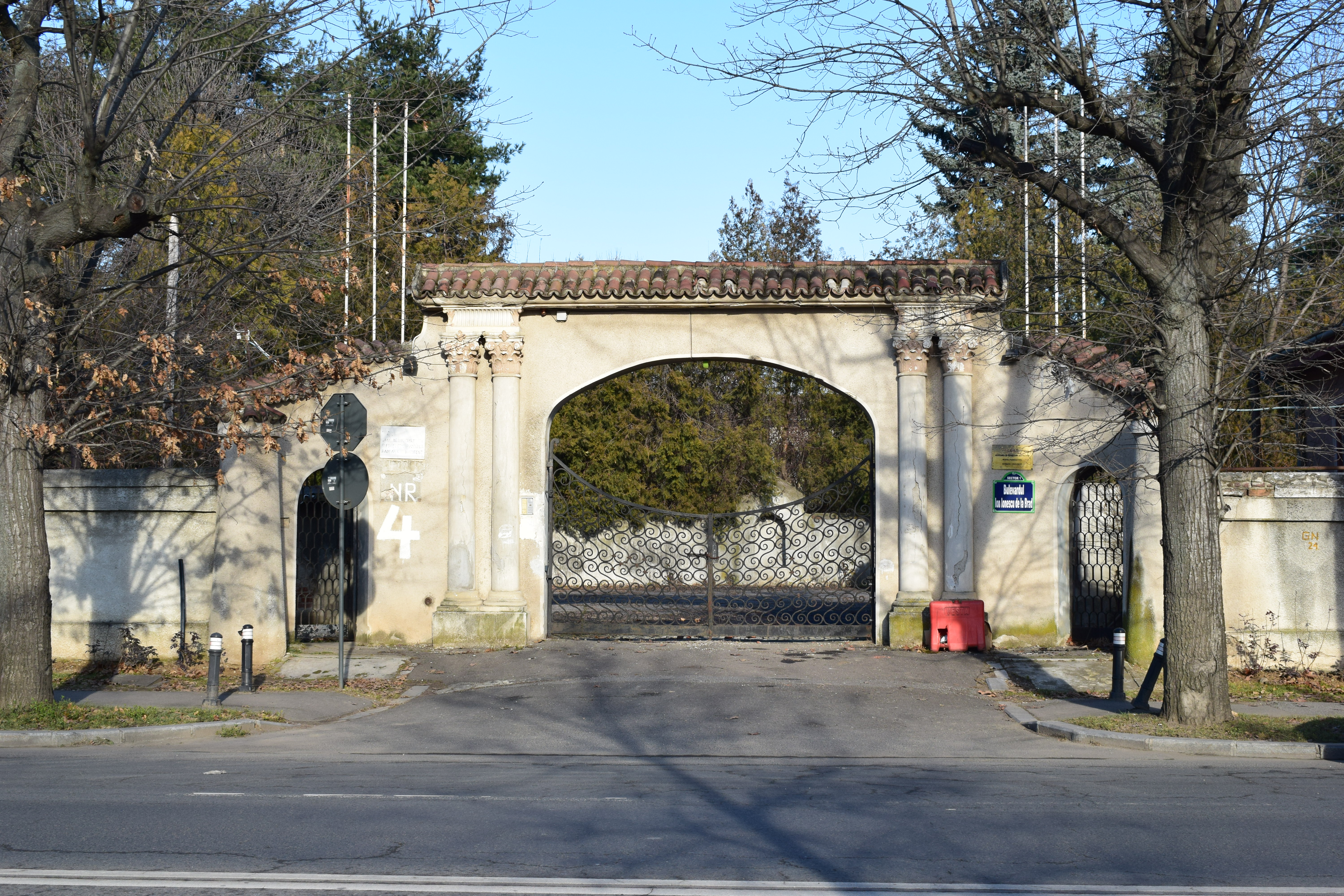
The entrance of Nae Ionescu's villa in Băneasa

Nae Ionescu was the owner of a luxury villa in Băneasa village (now Băneasa neighborhood, in the northern part of Bucharest), situated at 4 Ion Ionescu de la Brad Avenue (position 44.498604°N 26.075206°E). It was considered one of the finest Bucharest residences at the time. The house remained in collective memory mainly because it is described in his students' writings (Mircea Vulcănescu and others). The house was built by architect George Matei Cantacuzino, under its owner's direct supervision.

In his book "Nae Ionescu așa cum l-am cunoscut" ("Nae Ionescu As I Knew Him"), Vulcănescu dedicates many pages in describing this house, in detail. He evokes the fact that a painting of El Greco was displayed there (a Descent from the Cross), on which Ionescu took great pride.

Nae Ionescu died in this very house, because of a heart attack, on 15 March 1940, while his girlfriend Cella Delavrancea was present. After his death, the house served as an official residence to Marshal Ion Antonescu (sometime after his rise in power on 6 September 1940).

After the Communist regime was installed, the villa was given to the University of Agronomic Sciences (since the land of "Ferma Regală Băneasa" (Băneasa Royal Farm) lies around the building). Today, it is the headquarters of "Stațiunea de Cercetare-Dezvoltare pentru Pomicultură Băneasa" (statiuneabaneasa.ro), a research facility for pomology.
