= Cuvântul =

Romanian daily newspaper

Cuvântul (Romanian pronunciation: [kuˈvɨntul], meaning "The Word") was a daily newspaper, published by philosopher Nae Ionescu in Bucharest, Romania, from 1926 to 1934, and again in 1938. It was primarily noted for progressively adopting a far-right and fascist agenda, and for supporting, during the 1930s, the revolutionary fascist Iron Guard.

Notable staff members of Cuvântul during its initial run included Mircea Eliade, Mihail Sebastian, Victor Ion Popa, Perpessicius, Mac Constantinescu, Ion Călugăru, Dem. Theodorescu, George Breazul, and Paul Sterian. Editor Nae Ionescu died in March 1940.

It resumed publication in October 1940, after the establishment of the National Legionary State, under the directorship of Petre P. Panaitescu. The relaunched paper became an official organ of the Iron Guard, carrying the subtitle "Newspaper of the Legionary Movement" ("Ziar al Mișcării Legionare"). After the Legionnaire's rebellion and the ousting of the Iron Guard from government in January 1941, it ceased publication again.
