= English Passage =

English Passage Pasajul Englez
- Passage
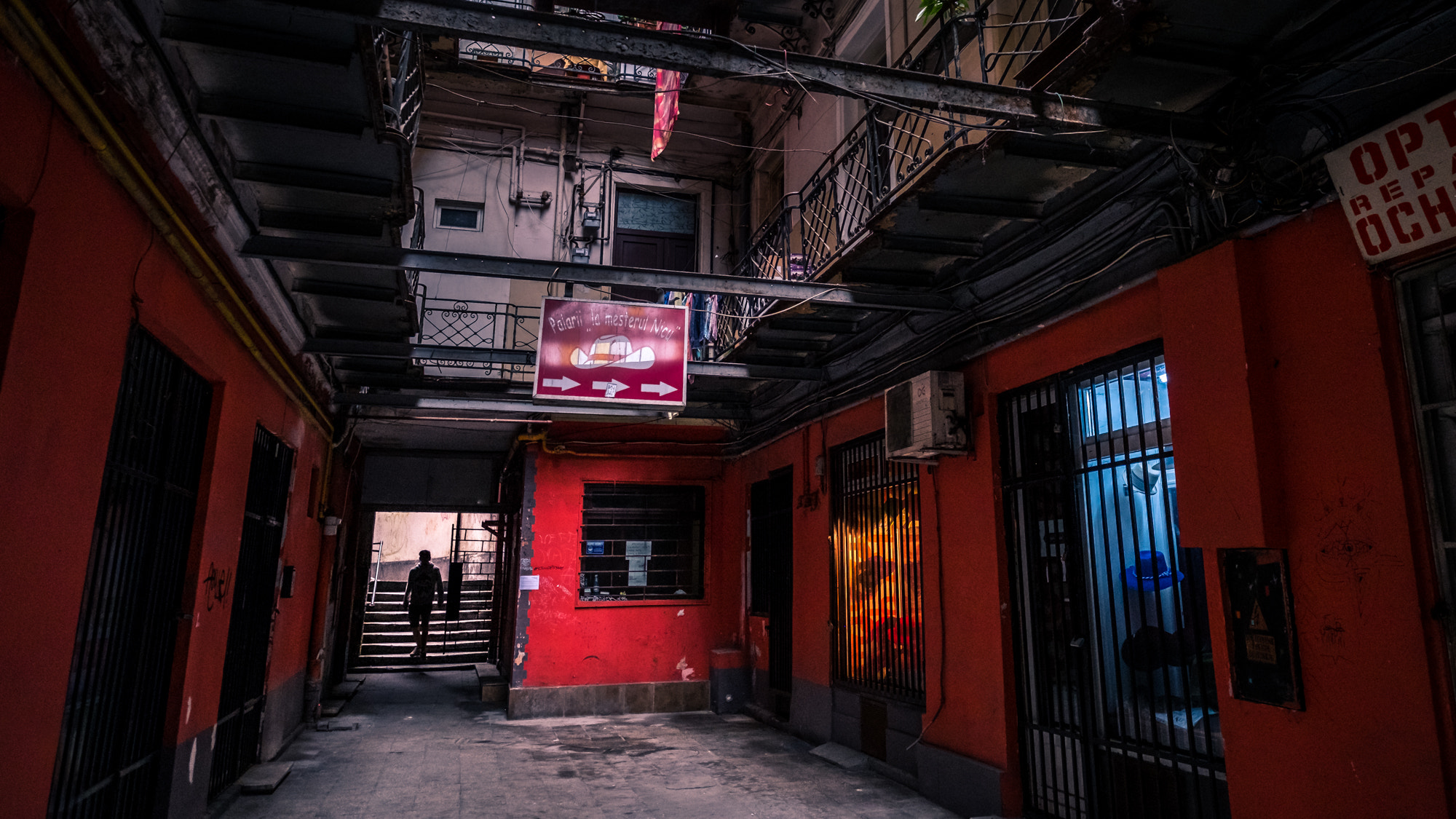
- The English Passage in 2017

- Location in Bucharest English Passage (Romania)
- Coordinates: 44.43683°N 26.098504°E
- Country: Romania
- City: Bucharest

The English Passage (Romanian: Pasajul Englez) is a passage in the centre of Bucharest, Romania. The passage lies between the Calea Victoriei and the Strada Academiei.

== Origins ==
In 1855, the jeweller Joseph Resch, who had arrived from Vienna in 1837, had a house built in the heart of Bucharest. The house, designed by architect Ernst Wolsch, was located on the Calea Victoriei in front of the area where the National Theatre would later be built. The house was described as "imposing" and was 3 stories and a clock tower on the roof.

== History ==
The house was sold in 1885 to Grigore Eliade, the son of a wealthy innkeeper, who turned it into the "English Hotel" (Hotelul English). The furniture and fittings for the hotel were imported from London. During the conversion, the passage was constructed from Calea Victoriei to Academiei Street. The passage was built similarly to other passages that were fashionable in the capitals of Western Europe at the time. The passage is high (the building having a ground floor and three upper floors) but narrow and covered with a glass roof on a metal frame. Most of the hotel rooms were located along the passage. On both sides of the passage, there are metal balconies with windows behind.

The building retained its function as a hotel for only a few years. The rooms were too small to withstand the competition from other newer hotels and were turned into a luxury brothel. The windows on the upstairs balconies were suitable for women of the night to show themselves to the clientele passing through the passage. The passage allowed a more discreet access for customers who preferred not to be seen on Calea Victoriei entering a house of disrepute. In his youth, Panait Istrati worked there for a while as a valet (around 1904). Among the famous clients of the brothel were King Carol II and the writer Alexandru Paleologu. The brothel functioned until 1947 when it was closed by the communist authorities, who banned prostitution. The atmosphere of the place served as inspiration to Mateiu Caragiale for Craii de Curtea-Veche.

The building was then converted into apartments.

== Modern times ==
The passage is difficult to find because the entrances are just two meters high. The passage is neglected, and the metal balconies are rusty. The upper floors of the building are used for social housing with a few shops and workshops on the ground floor.

There have been proposals to refurbish and redevelop the passage.

== Film location ==
The English Passage has been used for various films, including Nest of Wasps directed by Horea Popescu and Dracula II: Ascension directed by Patrick Lussier.
