= Mitică =

Fictional character in works by Ion Luca Caragiale

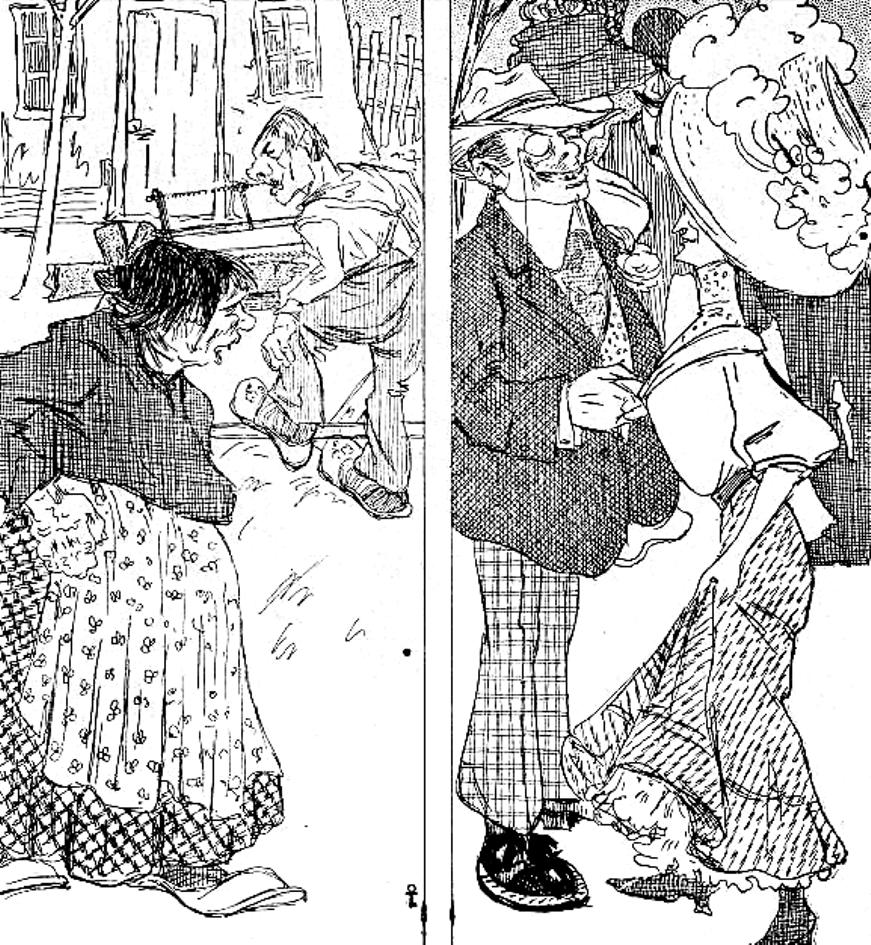
The "real-life Mitică", in a 1909 cartoon by Ion Theodorescu-Sion: his derelict home vs. his fashionable lifestyle

Mitică (Romanian pronunciation: [miˈtikə]) is a fictional character who appears in several sketch stories by Romanian writer Ion Luca Caragiale. The character's name is a common hypocoristic form of Dumitru or Dimitrie (Romanian for Demetrius). He is one of the best-known figures in Caragiale's 1901 collection Momente și schițe, as well as in Romanian humor at large. Mitică is a male resident of Bucharest whose background and status are not always clear, generally seen as an allegory of the average Bucharester or through extension, inhabitants of Romania's southern regions—Wallachia and Muntenia. According to accounts, he was based on a resident of Sinaia, whom Caragiale had befriended.

Caragiale used Mitică as a stock character to feature in satirical contexts; the biographical insights he provided are short and often contradict each other. Among Mitică's traits are his tendency to generate sarcastic comebacks and sententious catchphrases, a Francized speech, as well as inclinations to waste time and easily find his way out of problematic situations. His existence is connected to events in the history of Bucharest which he occasionally references in his jokes. Like Lache and Mache, who are present in Caragiale's fiction, the character is usually portrayed as a civil servant who has a hard time making ends meet, but who is well liked by his peers.

On account of his caricature-like nature, Mitică survived in common reference beyond Caragiale's age. The character was portrayed by several actors, and most notably by Ștefan Iordache in the film De ce trag clopotele, Mitică?. In contemporary Romanian, his name was turned into a common noun, and often pluralized under the form mitici. During and after the 1990s, the terms surfaced in polemics surrounding Romania's centralism and the alternative projects for Transylvania's regional autonomy. In this context, it was used in reference to administrators from Bucharest or the Old Kingdom. In parallel, the term was adapted into a stereotype of modern Bucharesters and inhabitants of other regions over the Southern Carpathians, who are often portrayed as belonging to the Balkans, as opposed to the Central European traditions of Transylvania. Under these definitions, Mitică and mitici were notably present in essays authored by the Transylvanian activist Sabin Gherman.

== Eponymous sketch ==
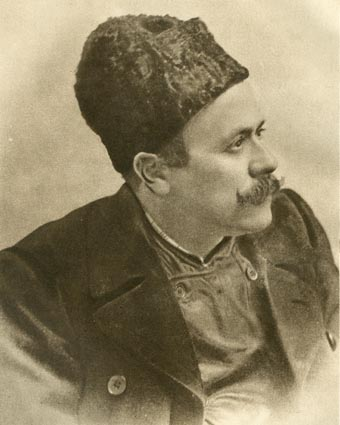
Ion Luca Caragiale in 1899, one year before he wrote Mitică

Ion Luca Caragiale first introduced Mitică to his readers in an eponymous sketch of 1900, where he evidenced the character's universal traits and indicates that the first name is enough to define the character. The opening passage notably draws a parallel between Bucharest and Paris (at a time when the Romanian capital was colloquially known as "little Paris" or "Paris of the East"), and mentions Gambrinus, a pub owned and managed by the writer himself:

"Of course we all ought to know [Mitică]: we bump into him so very often—in shops, in the trolley, in the tram car, on a bicycle, in the train wagon, at the restaurant, at Gambrinus—in short, everywhere.
Mitică is the Bucharester par excellence. And given that Bucharest is a little Paris, Mitică himself is, obviously, a little Parisian.
He is neither young nor old, neither handsome nor ugly, he is so so; he is a lad whose features are all balanced; but that which sets him apart, that which makes him have a marked character is his original and inventive spirit."

With sarcasm, Caragiale proceeds to indicate that the character's main trait is his inventive use of Romanian and his tendency to coin terms and make jokes, with which "First and foremost, our little Parisian astounds the provincials". The remainder of the sketch lists Mitică's remarks, part of which are platitudes or clichés. Some of them are isolated observations, which the author defines as "sentimental, lyrical, and melancholic": "The most beautiful girl can only offer what she has to offer", "Life is a dream, death is an awakening", and "Every rose has its thorn".

Most of Mitică's lines are comebacks in dialogue, and Caragiale notes that his character takes pride in "being unrivaled" when it comes to these. The writer implicates himself in the story, portraying himself as his character's good friend and a main target for such remarks—for instance, he recounts that, soon after New Year's Eve 1900, Mitică pretended not to have recognized him because "it's been a century since we last saw each other!" He writes how, when he was ordering a țuică in the presence of Mitică, the latter jokingly asked the bartender not to comply, "for [Caragiale] is likely to drink it".

The character's lines offer glimpses into his financial and social status. Thus, he claims that he does not carry change because the metal might attract lightning, refuses to listen to his friends' confessions because they did not pay the revenue stamp for complaints, and, when told that cabs are available, he sarcastically tells the drivers that they may go home. In one instance, he publicizes his goal to run in elections, but explains that he is going to contest a non-existing seat—at a time when the Romanian Kingdom made use of the census suffrage and had established electoral colleges to stand for the three wealth-based categories, he claims his intention to enlist in the fourth college, for the sparsely populated area of Bucureștii-Noi. The sketch shows him to be married and to resent his mother-in-law, but to be courting a young female telegraph-operator.

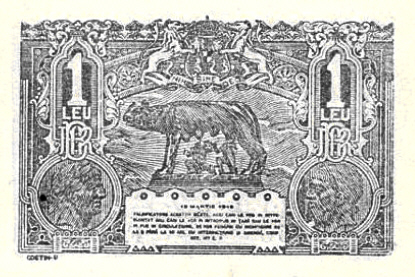
1 Romanian leu banknote of 1915, featuring the portraits of Trajan (left-hand corner) and Decebalus (right-hand corner)

In this context, Mitică is shown to have developed a series of jargon-like expressions. When recounting this to his friends that a clerk had been fired from office, he refers to this "a promotion", elaborating that the new office involves "chasing flies out of [the park in] Cișmigiu". Caragiale provides some of his character's one-liner jokes, which include references to garlic as "Serbian vanilla", and to Romanian leu banknotes as "Trajan's pictures" (alluding to their design, which, at the time, featured a portrait of the Roman Emperor). His absurd requests include asking a shopkeeper to sell him "a few centimeters" of yogurt, and telling friends to drink their beer "before it cools itself" or to "climb on top of a sheet of paper" in order to reach for clothes placed higher on a stand. Several of his puns refer to the switch from horse-drawn trams to trolley poles, for instance showing him blaming unexpected stops on horses not having been properly fed.

== Other texts ==
Mitică was again present in Caragiale's Tot Mitică ("Mitică Still"), a sketch which only comprises sections of dialog. It begins with an exchange of lines between an unnamed character and Mitică, which was to become one of the best known puns in this sequence. When asked the general interest question De ce trage clopotele, Mitică? ("What are they sounding the [church] bells for, Mitică?", which, in the Romanian original, may be interpreted as "What are they pulling the bells by?"), the protagonist answers De frânghie, monşer ("By the string, my dear").

Tot Mitică offers other glimpses into the character's financial problems, showing him complaining that he has been "pulling the devil's tail"—using a traditional proverb to indicate that he has had a hard time getting by. To this, he adds that the devil would be suing him for injuries. He claims that he is going to spend his vacation in the mountains, and elaborates that he is talking about the pawnbroking institution known as muntele de pietate (from the French for "Mountain of Piety"; see Mont de Piété). Mitică enters a restaurant to order only things which he knows are free ("a toothpick, a match, a glass of water and a newspaper"). In other such sequences of events, he is shown eating in a pub as a means to "defend himself from death", and borrowing money which he promises not to return.

When, in order to converse with a friend in a different compartment, he is traveling second class on a first class train ticket, Mitică asks the conductor to pay him the difference. He is shown anxiously walking about in the Bucharest Tribunal hall, and asking to see a lawyer for his defense, jokingly claims that he wants to be defended "from flies". When invited for a walk in the Herăstrău Park, which was heavily forested at the time, he pretends to have understood this as an invitation to chop trees, and stresses that he buys his firewood.

Mitică still frequents the beer garden, and one of the dialogs mentions that he spends entire nights there. He is shown to be flirting with women, including the telephone operator, and boasts that several ladies visit him in his home.

The sketch includes several references to well-known characters of the day, including the Conservative Party leader Petre P. Carp, the archaeologist Grigore Tocilescu, the Royal administrator Ioan Kalinderu, the actor Ion Niculescu (as Iancu Niculescu), as well as the dentist Kibrik. The character reveals his tendencies toward political satire, with a one-liner introduced by Caragiale's definition of "Mitică as a chauvinist"—Mitică is shown announcing that the only song he wants to have played at his funeral is the nationalist tune Deşteaptă-te, române! (which translates as "Awaken Thee, Romanian!").

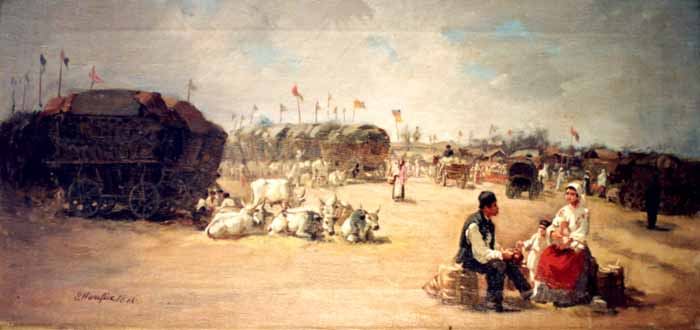
Târgul Moşilor, the fair in Obor (late 19th-century painting by Sava Henția)

In addition to the main sketch and Tot Mitică, Caragiale introduced a character of this name in a longer piece, titled 1 Aprilie ("The 1st of April"), which centers on an April Fool gone wrong. Late in the evening, this Mitică decides to hide in Cişmigiu while his lover Cleopatra pretends to court their common friend Mişu Poltronul—with simulated indignation, he takes Mişu by surprise as Cleopatra embraces him. Mitică dies hours after Mişu, who reacts out of instinct to his threatening voice, hits him over the forehead with a cane. Another Mitică—"Mr. Mitică the haberdasher", whose family name is probably Georgescu—is present in the 1900 sketch La Moşi ("At the Fair in Obor"), where he is shown accompanied by his family and ridiculing his mother-in-law in public. In another such piece, titled Iniţiativa... ("The Initiative..."), Caragiale recounts another dialog with "my buddy Mitică", who is shown to be unnerved that the Romanian state "is indifferent" to the fact that infants, his daughter included, do not have wet nurses assigned to them, and that breastfeeding has to rely on the private sector. Another or the same Mitică makes a brief appearance in Inspecţiune ("An Inspection"), where he is one of the clerks investigating the bizarre suicide of the civil servant Anghelache.

A Mitică is present in the piece called Ţal!...—the title comes from a face ţal ("to make ţal"), an antiquated expression which, as Caragiale explains in the beginning of his story, means "to make a payment" (from the German zahlen). The writer illustrates this concept by invoking a meeting between him, Mitică, and Mitică's wife Graziella. Caragiale recounts how his friend served him and others a copious dinner in his house, and then made them sit through Graziella's reading of her own lengthy essay on women as portrayed in Romanian folklore. To this goal, Caragiale explains, Mitică discreetly claimed that it was ţal and added, using a quasi-official parlance, that "all bills are to be paid". The piece ends with Caragiale exiting Mitică's house in haste and: as the latter shouts "to be seeing each other", he exclaims "to be left alone, Mitică".

== Background themes and sources of inspiration ==
Despite Mitică's association with Bucharest and his usual most common career as a state employee, several commentators have recounted that he may have been based on Gheorghe Matheescu, an entrepreneur from the town of Sinaia (located on the Prahova Valley, in northern Muntenia). Matheescu took pride in this supposed connection, and, around 1939, argued in its favor in front of literary historian Şerban Cioculescu. Cioculescu recorded the rumor, and indicated that it was backed by information received from Caragiale's daughter, Ecaterina Logadi. Her father reportedly enjoyed Matheescu's company, and, in 1901, even authored short advertisements for his store.

Mitică and Lache and Mache have often been seen as three manifestations of a main type in Caragiale's work—the petty clerk who spends his time off in lively company. Literary historian Garabet Ibrăileanu, an adherent to the left-wing trend known as Poporanism, was among the first to stress that Mitică's name, like those of Lache and Mache, was actually supposed to enhance his everyday nature, while arguing that the character stood for the first generation of commoners with access to education. Ibrăileanu, who criticized Caragiale for his satirical overview of the social process, believed that the clerks in his work are unnecessarily cynical, and stressed that Inspecţiune was the only one of his works were "one sees at least one glitter of kindness in the souls of the mitici".

Literary historian George Călinescu saw Mitică as a main representative of Balkan subjects in Ion Luca Caragiale's prose, and listed among the character's other traits his pessimism in respect to historical developments, as well as his interest in rallying people off the street and imposing his ideas on them. He defined the latter aspect as "southern", and noted that, like other heroes of Caragiale's sketches, Mitică is "at the antipode of Romanticism", and inhabits a place where "Gothic meditation does not flourish". In his history of the Junimea literary society, Z. Ornea argued that there was a link between Mitică's personality and Caragiale's strong rejection of nationalism:

"Caragiale's mitici are jovial, good-natured characters, easy-going in their thought and behavior. Solemnity does not suit them and fanatical monomanias are unimaginable in this context. An ecstatically nationalist Mitică is a contradiction in terms, since his formula in life is accommodation, adaption to the situations."

The character and his counterparts have been understood as purveyors and exponents of moft, a concept treasured by Caragiale. The word, meaning "trifle" or "nonsense", refers to pretentious and often ridiculous expectations of people caricatured in his work, but is uttered by such characters in reference to each other (as their tendency to dismiss events they are confronted with, no matter how important they may be). Moft was notably present in Caragiale's own satirical magazine, Moftul Român (which he issued at intervals in the 1890s and after 1900). Two mentions of, respectively, moft and the magazine itself are made in Tot Mitică (in reference to Petre P. Carp and to a woman courted by Mitică's friend Costică).

Mitică's voluble nature has itself been considered to have negative implications. An assessment of this was offered by Călinescu, who rejected the popular take on the character as boorish:

"Mitică is a gossiper, a scoundrel, an intriguer, in general on account of his garrulous nature, and a generous and confusing mystifier, agreeing to render services without having the strength to complete them, which in turn permits him to ask services from anyone else [...]. He is easy-going, with a horror for suffering and is most of all a well-mannered man. The impression that Caragiale's heroes are vulgar is false and mostly arises from the fact that, wishing to seem distinguished, they have not yet cultivated their speech and gestures."

Caragiale created Mitică at a time when the Romanian culture as developed in the Old Kingdom was the recipient of French influence, and the Romanian language was open to Francization. The character himself partakes in the process, and is shown to have adopted several of the manners and pastimes associated with the French Third Republic.

== Modern uses and influence ==
=== Cultural and political symbol ===
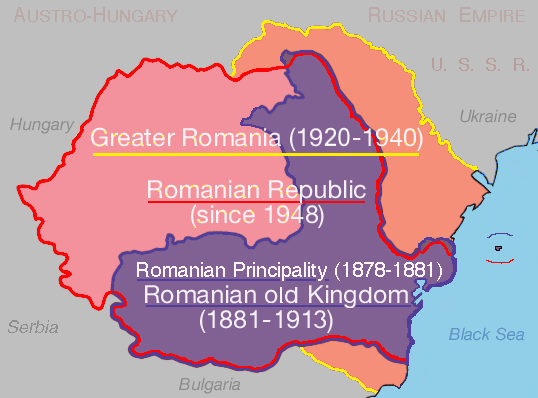
The Romanian Old Kingdom (in purple), Transylvania and southern Bukovina in pink, other regions of Greater Romania in orange

The literary critic Paul Zarifopol, who was Ion Luca Caragiale's good friend, made several references to Mitică as a prototype of ignorance. He thus used the character to define the most ignorant of journalists and newspaper readers, and, in his lengthy essay titled Din registrul ideilor gingașe ("From the Register of Gentle Ideas"), argued that Mitică's traits survived in the manners and morals of state employees and journalists after Caragiale's death, throughout World War I and after the creation of Greater Romania.

Political interpretations of Mitică's status were present at an earlier stage: in his influential essay Neoiobăgia ("Neo-Serfdom"), the Marxist thinker Constantin Dobrogeanu-Gherea, himself a friend of Caragiale, used the protagonist of Inițiativa... to illustrate the interventionist policies of the National Liberal cabinets. He contended that the two terms of his comparison shared "a mania for [state] intervention", and argued that the national liberals had a tendency to overregulate the economy.

Commentators such as Constantin Amăriuței have proposed that there is an intrinsic connection between Mitică and Gore Pirgu, one of the protagonists in the novel Craii de Curtea-Veche, authored by Ion Luca Caragiale's son and rival, the Symbolist Mateiu Caragiale. Pirgu, who enjoys a successful career during the interwar despite having a shady past and coarse manners, has been defined by Amăriuței as "the eternal and real Mitică of the Romanian world".

Constantin Amăriuței was noted for defining Mitică's character (Miticism) through ontological terms borrowed from the German philosopher Martin Heidegger. He thus argued that, for all their mundane motivations, the character and his peers illustrated a search present with all individuals, identifiable with Heidegger's concepts of Being-in-the-World and Being-toward-death (see Heideggerian terminology).

In 2000, several essays by literary historian Laurențiu Ulici were published posthumously, under the title Mitică și Hyperion ("Mitică and Hyperion"). This name drew a direct comparison between the voluble Mitică and an equally famous character in Romanian literature, the aloof, rational, and god-like protagonist of Mihai Eminescu's poem Luceafărul ("The Morning Star"). Ulici attempted to synthesize the two conflicting natures in the Romanian identity, and viewed the two as terms in "an oxymoron" standing at the center of Romanian culture.

In his essay on the history of drunkenness in Romanian culture, Mircea Bălan defined Mitică as:

"The Bucharest wise guy, a haughty rascal, a swindler doubled by a thief and a boor giving himself airs, deplorable, awkward and discredited from the get-go, in reality an aborted 'dastard', an aborted 'wanton'."

Literary critic Ioana Pârvulescu agreed that there was a link between Mitică and other characters in Caragiale's sketches; she subsequently argued that formed an integral part of the writer's caricature of Romania in its entirety, and that the measure to which they reflected reality is impossible to detect. In her 2007 volume of essays, titled În Țara Miticilor. De șapte ori Caragiale ("In the Land of the Mitici. Seven Times Caragiale"), she stressed that the character was both more human and more artificial than his usual interpretations in 20th century commentary.

A particular definition of Mitică and mitici was adopted by many inhabitants of Transylvania, who used the terms in reference to either Bucharest-based politicians or inhabitants of the city at large, and contrasted them with their counterparts to the northwest. The character has thus evolved to include a stereotypical view of contemporary Bucharesters or Wallachians, one which depicts them as sciolist, arrogant, aggressive and cunning. In other contexts, the mitici may be seen as not having an adequate familiarity with the culture of Transylvania, and are associated with the Balkans (whereas Transylvania is identified with Central Europe).

In September 1998, the Transylvanian journalist and essayist Sabin Gherman issued a pamphlet titled M-am săturat de România ("I've Grown Tired of Romania"), which was at the center of a scandal over its radical tone and demands for regional autonomy in Transylvania. In its first lines, the message drew a parallel between Mitică and "politicians in power", identifying centralism and the politics of Romania with, among other things, disorganization and statism. Gherman went on to contrast "the seriousness, the elegance, the discipline" which he attributed to Transylvania with the invasion of "miticisms, ordinary Balkanisms, the civilization of pumpkin seeds". The latter sentence comprised a reference to the habit of consuming seeds as snacks, in which he saw evidence of rudimentary behavior:

"Here [that is, outside Transylvania], one doesn't have rights, but complaisances. Here they eat pumpkin seeds, they use 'there is many' in their speech, and, in general, people get born, multiply themselves and die."

=== Portrayals and tributes ===
One of the best-known references to the character is the 1981 film De ce trag clopotele, Mitică? (translated as "Why Are the Bells Ringing, Mitică?"), directed by Lucian Pintilie. Titled after the opening dialog in Tot Mitică, the film was actually structured around Caragiale's play D-ale carnavalului, and included portions from several other writings—including 1 Aprilie. Mitică, who makes a brief appearance before dying at the hands of Mişu Poltronul, is portrayed by Ștefan Iordache. De ce trag clopotele, Mitică? was noted for its subtle undertones, through which it expressed criticism of the Romanian communist regime (at a time when the country was led by Nicolae Ceaușescu).

In 2003, the Luceafărul Theater in Iași hosted a dramatized version of Momente și schițe. Titled În lumea lui Mitică ("In Mitică's World"), it was directed by Constantin Brehnescu and starred Dionisie Vitcu.

The national television channel TVR 2 produces a weekly show titled D'ale lu' Mitică (roughly: "Mitică's Stuff"), whose title is inspired by Caragiale's hero. Hosted by the actor Mitică Popescu, the show groups reportage pieces from the Romanian countryside, recording unusual events which, the editors believe, serve to illustrate the problems faced by small communities in the post-1989 transition period.
