= Luca Caragiale =

Romanian writer

Luca Ion Caragiale
- Luca Caragiale between pianist Cella Delavrancea and writer Panait Istrati. Photograph taken in Berlin, 1911 or 1912.
- Born: 3 July 1893
- Died: 7 June 1921 (aged 27)
- Occupations: poet, novelist, translator, civil servant
- Writing career
- Period: 1916–1921
- Genres: experimental literature, erotic literature, free verse, lyric poetry, ballade, madrigal, rondel, villanelle, collaborative fiction, memoir
- Movements: Symbolism, Parnassianism, modernism, avant-garde

Luca Ion Caragiale (Romanian pronunciation: [ˈluka iˈon karaˈdʒjale]; 3 July 1893 – 7 June 1921), also known as Luki, Luchi or Luky Caragiale, was a Romanian poet, novelist and translator, whose contributions were a synthesis of Symbolism, Parnassianism and modernist literature. His career, cut short by pneumonia, mostly produced lyric poetry with cosmopolitan characteristics, distinct preferences for neologisms and archaisms, and willing treatment of kitsch as a poetic subject. These subjects were explored in various poetic forms, ranging from the conventionalism of formes fixes, some of which were by then obsolete, to the rebellious adoption of free verse. His poetry earned posthumous critical attention and was ultimately collected in a 1972 edition, but sparked debates among literary historians about the author's contextual importance.

The son of dramatist Ion Luca Caragiale and the half-brother of writer Mateiu Caragiale, Luca also became the son-in-law of communist militant Alexandru Dobrogeanu-Gherea. It was with Alexandru's brother, philosopher Ionel Gherea, that Luca wrote his work of collaborative fiction and sole novel. Titled Nevinovățiile viclene ("The Cunning Naïvetés"), it created controversy with its portrayal of adolescent love. Here and in his various modernist poems, Caragiale made a point of questioning established perceptions of love and romance.

== Biography ==
=== Childhood and adolescence ===
Born into the Caragiale theatrical and literary family, of Greek-Romanian heritage, Luca was, through his mother Alexandrina, a descendant of the middle class Burelly family. A famed beauty and a prominent socialite, Alexandrina was the model of visual artist Constantin Jiquidi (whose drawing of her in national costume became the first Romanian-issued postcard). According to genealogical investigations conducted by Luca's father, she was also of Greek descent.

Luca was Ion Luca Caragiale's second son, after Mateiu (later celebrated as the author of Craii de Curtea-Veche novel), who was born from the dramatist's extra-conjugal affair with Maria Constantinescu. According to researcher Ioana Pârvulescu, while Mateiu felt permanently uneasy about his illegitimacy, Luca was "without doubt" his father's favorite, and, unlike his older brother, "effortlessly knew how to make himself loved." Alexandrina Burelly later gave birth to Luca's younger sister, Ecaterina, who, in her old age, was to provide a written account of the tense relationship between Caragiale's two families.

Luca's childhood and adolescence, coinciding with his father's itinerant projects, was spent abroad: while Luca was still a young child, he was taken by his family on a trip to France, Switzerland, Austria-Hungary and Italy, and they all eventually settled in the German Empire's capital city, Berlin (1905). Both he and Ecaterina were "almost confined to their home" by Ion Luca, who had a maniacal fear of disease and accidents. Around 1909, with his father's consent, Luca was being tutored in scientific subjects by poet-philosopher Panait Cerna, who was being hosted by the Caragiales in the German Empire while completing his studies. In the end, literary historian Șerban Cioculescu argues, the young man acquired "a vast, albeit unschooled, culture", added to his native "ease of improvisation" and "outstanding memory". Ion Luca took a direct approach to his adolescent son's education, and the two often debated on cultural subjects, or on Luca's left-wing opinions, such as his support for the Social Democratic Party of Germany. Ion Luca and his youngest son traveled intensely throughout Northern Germany, spending time on the Baltic coast, and once making their way into Denmark. Before Ion Luca's 1912 death in Berlin, they also returned on brief visits to their homeland, vacationing in the Prahova Valley resort of Sinaia.

=== War years ===
Alexandrina, Ecaterina and Luca Caragiale spent two more years in Berlin, living on a Romanian state pension; in mid 1914, sensing that world War I was about to start, the family moved back to Romania, and Luca was forced to give on his plans to attend a French college. The young poet made his debut in print during Romania's period of neutrality. On 14 May 1916, his Triptic madrigalesc ("A Madrigalesque Triptych") was published by the literary magazine Flacăra. The avant-garde aspect of such texts outraged the Neoclassical author Duiliu Zamfirescu, whose comments nevertheless assented that Luca did not lack poetic talent. From 1916 to the time of his death, Caragiale also worked on a distinct set of poems, probably inspired by a fond recollection of his stays in Sinaia: Dintr-un oraș de munte. Meditații ("From a Mountain Town. Meditations").

After his marriage to Fany Gherea (tentatively dated to 1919), Luca cemented the links between the Caragiale and the descendants of Constantin Dobrogeanu-Gherea, the Marxist theorist who had been his father's close friend. Fany was Constantin's granddaughter. Her father was journalist Alexandru "Sașa" Gherea (later a founding figure of the clandestine Romanian Communist Party), and her mother a native of Bavaria. Luca and Constantin's other son, Ionel, were working together on Nevinovățiile viclene, a novel. It was first published in the 1910s by the Iași-based literary review Viața Românească, and immediately sparked controversy for describing the sexual desires of the educated youth. The accusations of pornography, Pârvulescu notes, placed Viața Românească editor Garabet Ibrăileanu in a "delicate situation", but also enlisted a public defense of the text, written by Ion Luca's friend and collaborator Paul Zarifopol (whose statements, she notes, were "spiritual and persuading"). This collaborative text was also the last work of fiction ever authored by Ionel Gherea, who subsequently focused almost exclusively on his contribution to local philosophical debates.

Once Romania joined the Entente side and its southern areas fell to the Central Powers, Luca spent time in Bucharest, the German-occupied former capital. This period saw his controversial involvement with the collaborationist administration, drafted from among Conservative Party dissidents. Beginning in late 1916, Luca was chief of staff for Virgil Arion, the puppet Minister of Culture. The diaries kept by Conservative politico Alexandru Marghiloman, who was himself close to the collaborationist lobby, claim that Luca was well liked by the German overseers: invited to the Athénée Palace festivities in honor of military governor August von Mackensen (October 1917), Luca is said to have caught negative attention from the German-appointed Police chief Alexandru Tzigara-Samurcaș, who wondered why the presence of such "nippers" was required. Marghiloman also recorded an incident of December 1917, during which Luca, as Arion's chief of staff, humiliated Tzigara-Samurcaș when he requested a Police presence at one of his Culture Ministry functions directly from his German commanders. In June 1918, Luca took the controversial decision of publicly rallying himself with the Central Powers supporters in Romania: probably instigated by the more politically minded Mateiu, Luca signed his name to an open letter which called on Conservative Party leader Petre P. Carp to take hold of a hypothetical Germanophile cabinet.

=== Late activity ===
During the early interwar period, Luca Caragiale remained settled in Romania, and frequented its literary circles. He authored memoirs of his father's life, published in January 1920 by Ideea Europeană journal. Titled Amintiri despre Caragiale ("Memories of Caragiale"), they notably include details about Ion Luca's deep dislike for lyric poetry, as well as accounts of his aging father's leftist flirtations (from the outrage he felt at learning about the authorities' violence in quelling the 1907 peasants' revolt to his friendship with socialist activist Christian Rakovsky). The same year, he published with Viața Românească's sister company a translation of Knut Hamsun's novel Pan. His other translation work covered Edgar Allan Poe, as well as the poetry of François Villon—he was Romania's first Villon translator, seconded only in the 1930s by Horia Stamatu.

By 1921, Luca was working to publish his new poetry as a volume, which was to be titled Jocul oglinzilor ("The Game of Mirrors"). In late March of that year, he was one of the noted witnesses at a Romanian Academy public readings, which included the licentious poem Răsturnica (roughly, "She-tumbler"; from a răsturna, "to tumble"), written, but unsigned, by the avant-garde poet Ion Barbu. In May, he also appeared as a witness for the birth of Ecaterina's son, Vlad Geblescu-Caragiale. These were some of his final records of his activities. Described as a man of "sickly" constitution by literary historian Tudorel Urian, Caragiale fell ill with influenza shortly afterward, and quickly developed a form of pneumonia that caused his death in June. Zarifopol witnessed his "insane agony" experienced by his young friend, who "broke a bottle over his head, tore out clumps of his own hair" in an attempt to quell his pain. Caragiale was buried in his family plot at Bellu cemetery.

Fany Gherea remarried Radu Lipatti, a relative of pianist Dinu Lipatti; she moved to Switzerland, where she continued to play host to her Caragiale inlaws. Luca was also survived by his sister, who, after several failed marriages, became the wife of bureaucrat Petre Logadi in or around 1933. Both she and her husband were arrested by the Romanian communist authorities in 1951–1952; in 1955, Luca's exiled nephew, Vlad, became an editor for the anticommunist station Radio Free Europe. Luca's mother Alexandrina died in 1954, and shares his grave at Bellu.

Some interest in her son's work resurfaced in the following decades. In 1969, Nevinovățiile viclene was republished by the state-run publishing house for the youth, Editura Tineretului. His lifelong poetic contributions were collected as Jocul oglinzilor by literary historian Barbu Cioculescu, upon Ecaterina's request, and published Jocul oglinzilor (Editura Minerva, 1972). Ecaterina died in Bucharest in 1987. Her son Vlad, who was also a published novelist, died at Busset in 2006, by which time he was the last surviving of Ion Luca's descendants.

== Work ==
=== Symbolist and Parnassian poetry ===
Luca and Mateiu Caragiale's stylistic affiliation with Symbolism illustrated a secondary stage in the development of Romania's own Symbolist current. This ideological choice, literary historian George Călinescu notes, pitted Luca against his father, a noted adversary of first-generation Symbolists such as Alexandru Macedonski: "[Caragiale senior] disliked the Symbolists and he anguished Luki so badly, that the latter broke out crying and declared his father to be without understanding for 'real poetry'." Critics offer differing perspectives on Caragiale's overall contribution. According to Călinescu, his lyrical texts were generally "verbose and dry", while his other works lacked "the art of a prose writer." Ioana Pârvulescu also opines that, while Mateiu, whom his father credited with the least talent, was able to impose himself in Romanian literature, Luca's "vaguely Symbolist" poetry only displayed "the involuntary expressiveness that one finds in any first attempts." The verdict is common among other authors: Barbu Cioculescu and Ion Vartic mainly see young "Luki" as a mimetic and histrionic artist. For Șerban Cioculescu, the overall nature of young Caragiale's contribution was outstanding: "Luca Ion was in fact a virtuoso who tried his hand on all instruments and keyboards with the same dexterity, in search of not just a poetic fixation, but in one's own fixation among the chaos of one's time. Beyond the mirages that his unquestionable talent puts on display for us, one catches a glimpse of a dramatic process of consciousness."

A large part of Caragiale's contribution to poetry comprises bucolic poems, which Călinescu acknowledges for their "vibrant" depiction of wild landscapes. The methods of writing, Șerban Cioculescu notes, are those of "Parnassian perfection", akin in rigor and professionalism to the Neoclassical tendencies of Caragiale-father: in this stance, Caragiale favored "obsolete species" of poetry, or formes fixes, such as the ballade, the rondel and the villanelle. One poem, titled Ars poetica (Latin for "The Poetic Art"), is described by the same critic as evidence of Caragiale's Parnassian affiliation, and, although written in imperfect Romanian (verses in line with "cadence", but not "in agreement" with Romanian grammar), similar to the purist approach of the nominally Symbolist author Mihai Codreanu. He also notes that the implicit aestheticism of this credo creates a natural link between Luca and Mateiu, opposing them both to their more practical father. The poem reads:

Eu vreau să-mi fie versul sonor ca și izvoare
Ce-și strig înfiorarea prin vântu-naripat;
Să fie-n dimineață un clopot legănat
Când tremură-n văzduhuri cucernica-i chemare

Translation:

I want my verse to be as sonorous as springs
Shouting their frisson on the winged wind;
That it be a dangling morning church bell
When it rings its pious call into the skies

This series of poems offers insight into Luca Caragiale's lyrical perspective on nature. According to Cioculescu, Dintr-un oraș de munte and other nature-themed poems show that Luca had inherited his father's feelings of despair in front of bad weather, that they both found autumn rains to be unbearable. The depressive state in such poems is enhanced by Caragiale's preference for antithesis, and in particular by his understanding of the universe as oppressive, deceptive and stagnant—according to Cioculescu, his "Weltanschauung is dominated by a genius that, when not malignant, is in any case perfidious, treacherous."

To the bareness of autumnal landscapes, Caragiale the younger opposed a universe dominated by floral ornamentation. According to Cioculescu, the poems reference "more than forty species" of flowers, ranging from rose, carnation, jasmine or lily to the rarely sung corydalis (Romanian: brebenel), basil (busuioc), honeysuckle (caprifoi), chamomile (mușețel) or white dittany (frăsinel). Luca turned the flower species into symbols of emotional or meditative states, often placing them in a direct relationship with capital-letter references to poetic ideals (Autumn, Love, Pathos, Death, Hopelessness etc.). One such allegory, present in the series titled Alte stanțe ("Other Stanzas"), associated lost love, mourning and the scent of jasmine flowers:

Dormi în flori de iasomie
Și-n nădejde zâmbitoare...
Vremea trece și nu moare...
Amintirea ta să fie
Ca pe ceruri largul zbor...
Fie somnul tău ușor,
Că Iubirea tot nu moare.

Translation:

You sleep now in jasmine flowers
And smiling against hope...
Time passes and does not die...
May your memory be
Like lofty flight upon the skies...
May your sleep be restful,
For Love itself still wouldn't die.

=== Avant-garde tendencies ===
The second category of poems are generally urban-themed, opting in favor of modernist means in both subjects and vocabulary. Discussing young Caragiale's conflict with Zamfirescu, Șerban Cioculescu concluded: "Luca may have seemed like an avant-garde poet, one of those who cultivated free verse and willingly simulated prosaic writing, into filming the everyday, with methods such as images caught from various angles." He added: "The poet is a lucid one, a modern one, who [...] demystifies, demythifies and desacralizes poetry's old themes." Caragiale's generic interest was in adapting to poetry the elements of "bad taste" in popular culture, of kitsch aesthetics and the banal.

A special connection between Caragiale and experimental literature was his ambition of modifying the standard Romanian lexis, through the introduction of neologisms or the recovery of obscure archaisms. Șerban Cioculescu argued that, by adopting this "twinned regime", Caragiale prolonged his stylistic connection with Parnassianism into the realm of avant-garde poetry, but did so at the risk of confusing his readers. The neologisms, some of which were described as "very curious" by the critic, include words that did not settle into the common language, such as perpetrat ("perpetrated") and sfinctic ("sphinx-like"); among the archaic words employed are some words found in Romanian Orthodox Church vocabulary—blagoslovenie ("blessing"), pogribanie ("funeral")—and obsolete titles such as virhovnic ("leader"). According to the Cioculescu, Luca shared Mateiu's love for antiquated things, but was in effect "more complex" stylistically than his brother. The speech characteristics were doubled by a recourse to theatrical attitudes, leading Barbu Cioculescu to speak of a stylistic approach reconnecting Luca's work to those of his forefathers, and especially to Ion Luca Caragiale's "mimetic" approach to comedy writing.

Among such works, critics have found memorable his Triptic madrigalesc, which, according to Călinescu, helped introduce to local literature "the cosmopolitan sensation, so cultivated by Western poetry (Valery Larbaud, Blaise Cendrars)". Dedicated to an unknown young woman, it opened with the lines:

Când te-am zărit
Întâia oară
Purtai un sweater verde,
Când te-am zărit
Treceai grăbită și tăcută
Prin parcul
Umed și crepuscular

Translation:

When I saw you
The first time
You were wearing a green sweater
When I saw you
You were hastily and silently
Walking through the park
The wet and crepuscular park

This prosaic preoccupation, Călinescu notes, led Caragiale to depict the dust-covered mahala quarters, the passage of loaded trucks, and the clamor of boarding school girls walking down boulevards. Various works in this series also display their author's sympathy for the urban underclass, showing the beggars' losing battle with the natural elements, or unloved old women reduced to envying the happy couples they meet on the street. In more or less allusive poems, included by Cioculescu among the "desacralizing" texts, Caragiale also tests the limits of propriety, and questions the sexual taboos of his generation, from schoolgirls fantasizing about being kept women, to the moral severity imposed on churchgoers and the impact of sexual inhibition on the subconscious. The poet's sensibility for such themes touched not just his choice of subjects, but also his appreciation of other poems. In a 1922 letter to critic Tudor Vianu, Ion Barbu recalled that Caragiale's enthusiasm for Răsturnica, which can be read as a grotesque but compassionate homage to a dead prostitute, far exceeded his own: in Barbu's definition, Răsturnica was "that smut which wrung tears from Luchi Caragiale".

=== Other writings ===
With Nevinovățiile viclene, Pârvulescu argues, the young Caragiale produced a "more interesting" work than his poems, but the text's nature made it impossible to delimit "what part is owed to which author." The debates surrounding are deemed "ridiculous" by Pârvulescu, who notes that the two protagonists, 15-year-old Radu and 13-year-old Sanda, only manage to steal each other "the first kisses." The eroticism is present, but, according to the same commentator, is also "diffused, kept in check at the level of suggestions", and comparable to the style of later novels by Ionel Teodoreanu. The children's discovery of love during a summer vacation intersects itself, and contrasts with, episodes in the mature relationship between an uncle and aunt. The underlying meditation about one's loss of innocence is also rendered by the book's two mottos. One is a quote from Immanuel Kant, suggesting that innocence is "hard to keep and easy to lose"; the other a "Spanish proverb": "The devil sits to the right side of the Cross."

Among Caragiale's other texts were several prose manuscripts brought to critical attention primarily for their titles, as listed by Călinescu: Isvodul vrajei ("The Catalog of Bewitching"), Chipurile sulemenite ("The Painted Faces"), Balada căpitanului ("The Captain's Ballad"). A more unusual text left by the poet is a self-portrait in prose. The piece drew the attention of writer and art historian Pavel Chihaia for being "of a sincerity that one can only hope to meet in the present", and for contrasting Mateiu's own "conceited" autobiographical texts. The text moves from issues related to Luca's physical appearance ("lifeless" eyes, "unpleasant and stupid" hair) to self-admitted moral weakness (the joy of being confronted with other people's defects, the "cowardice" which prompts him to "say things I do not mean" etc.).
