= Caru' cu Bere =

Bar and restaurant in Bucharest, Romania

Coordinates: 44.4321°N 26.0981°E

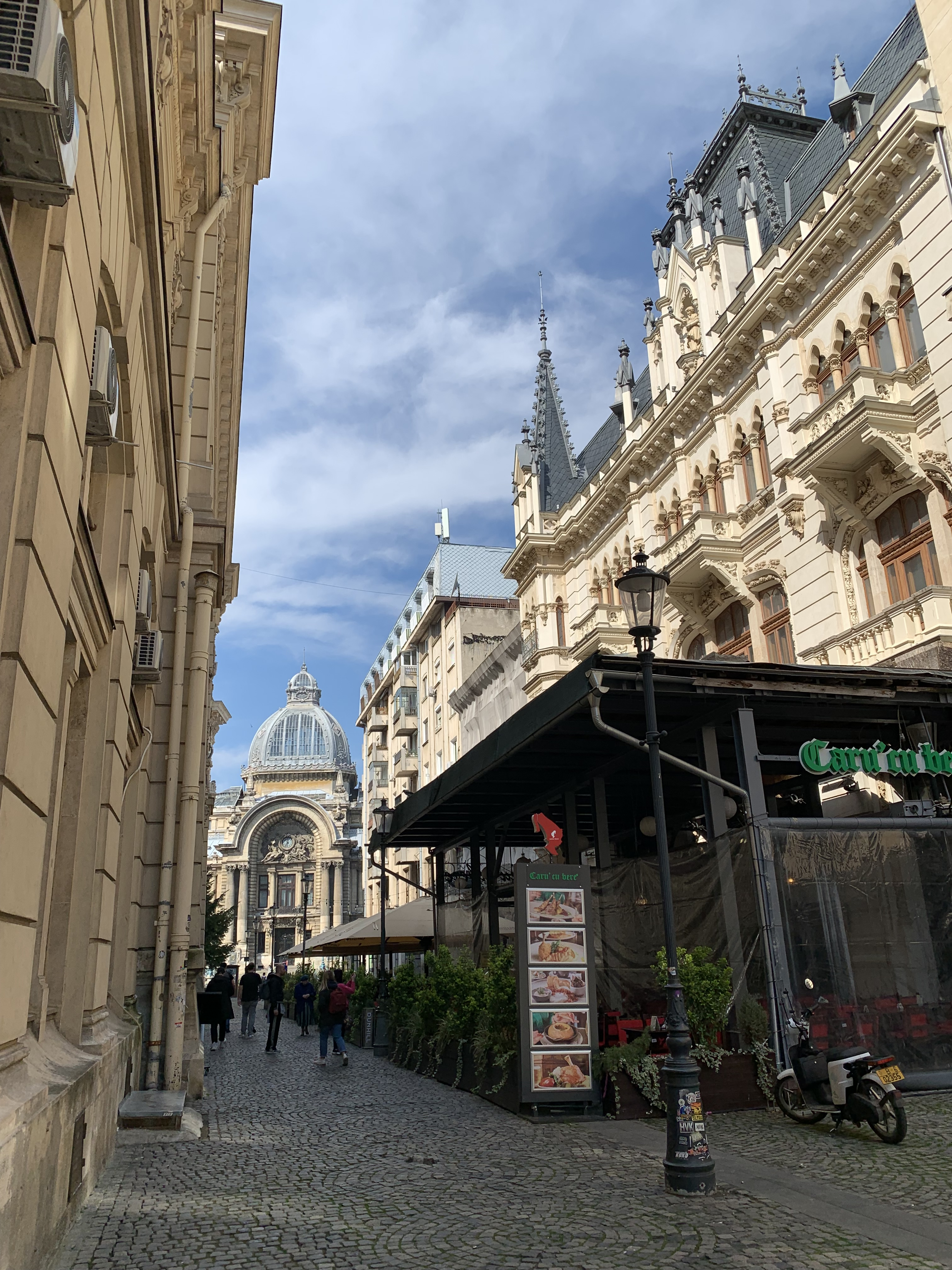
Exterior with CEC Palace visible

Caru' cu Bere (aka Carul cu Bere; "the beer wagon") is a bar and restaurant located at 5 Stavropoleos Street in the Lipscani district of Bucharest, Romania. The business was originally opened as a brewery in 1879 by Ioan Căbășan and his nephews, Ion, Gheorghe, and Nicolae Mircea. They were originally citizens of the Austro-Hungarian Empire and from Cața, Transylvania. In 1889, Căbășan assigned his lease to his eldest nephew, Ion. Ion died later that same year and was replaced in the family firm by the youngest sibling, Víctor.

Nicolae bought the building at 5 Stavropoleos Street in 1897, and made plans to open a restaurant there to expand their business operations. They hired an architect from Lemberg, at the time part of Austria-Hungary, Siegfried Kofczinski or Ziegfried Kofszinski/Kofsinski, to design a restaurant and brewery building in the Gothic Revival style. Co-owners were Nicolae, Ignat, and Víctor Mircea. The restaurant opened in 1899, featuring their beer. Victor left the establishment in 1912, opening his own brewery and several years later, Nicolae set up Ignat in a wine cellar business. When Nicolae died in 1929, his heirs assumed control of the business and operated it until the communist state nationalized the operation in 1949.

In 1986, extensive restoration was done on the property, led by Nicolae Gheorghe. When the Socialist Republic of Romania was overthrown in 1989, the heirs of the Mircea family began efforts to regain their ownership. In 1999, Caru' cu Bere was returned to them and they began extensive renovations to restore the property to its former state. It is noted for its distinctive Art Nouveau interior decoration. It is operated by Dragoș Petrescu's City Grill chain, and is classified as a historic monument, number B-II-m-B-19728.

Romanian writer Mateiu Caragiale's frame story, Sub pecetea tainei, is set in Caru' cu Bere.

== Gallery ==
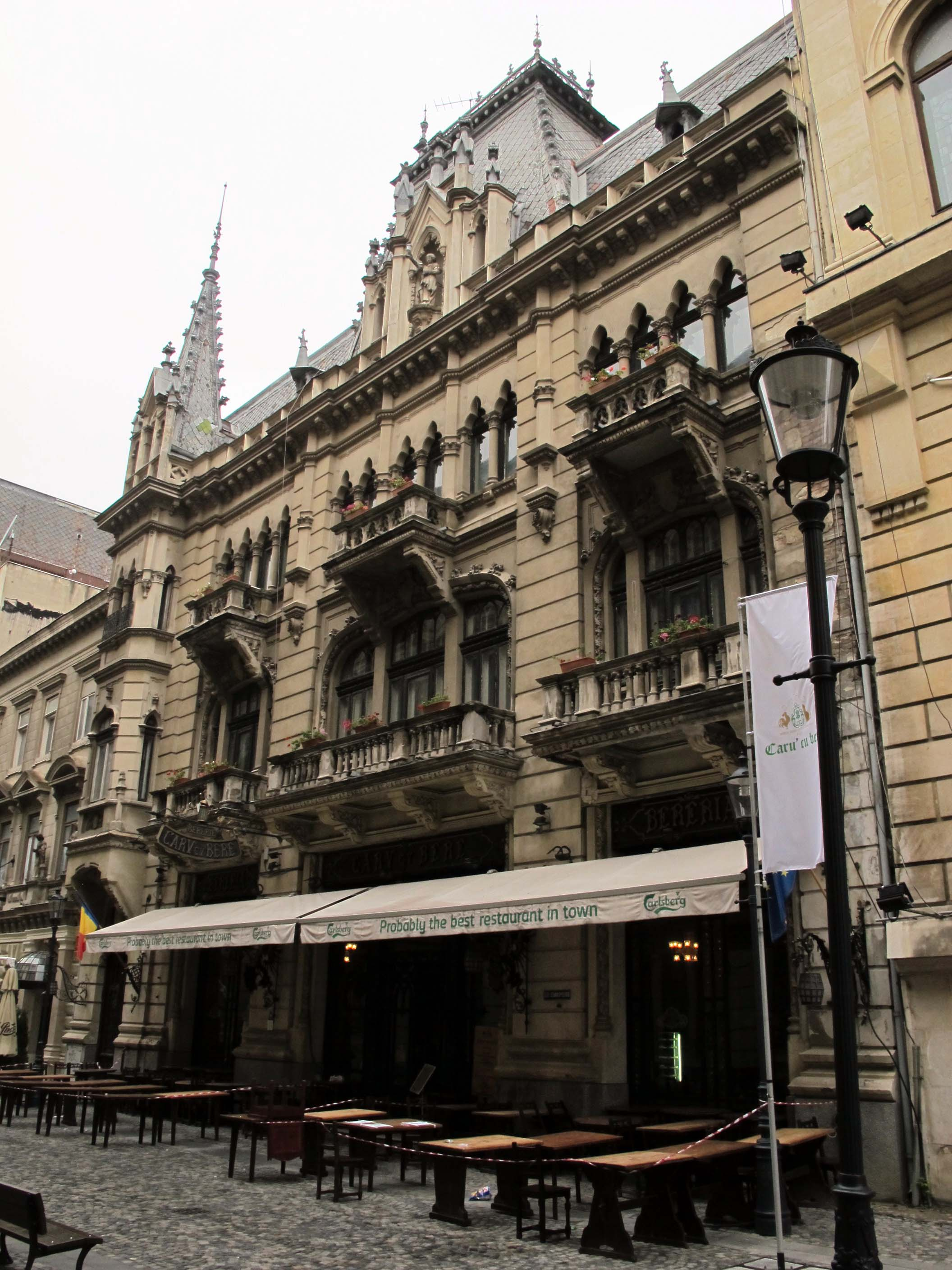

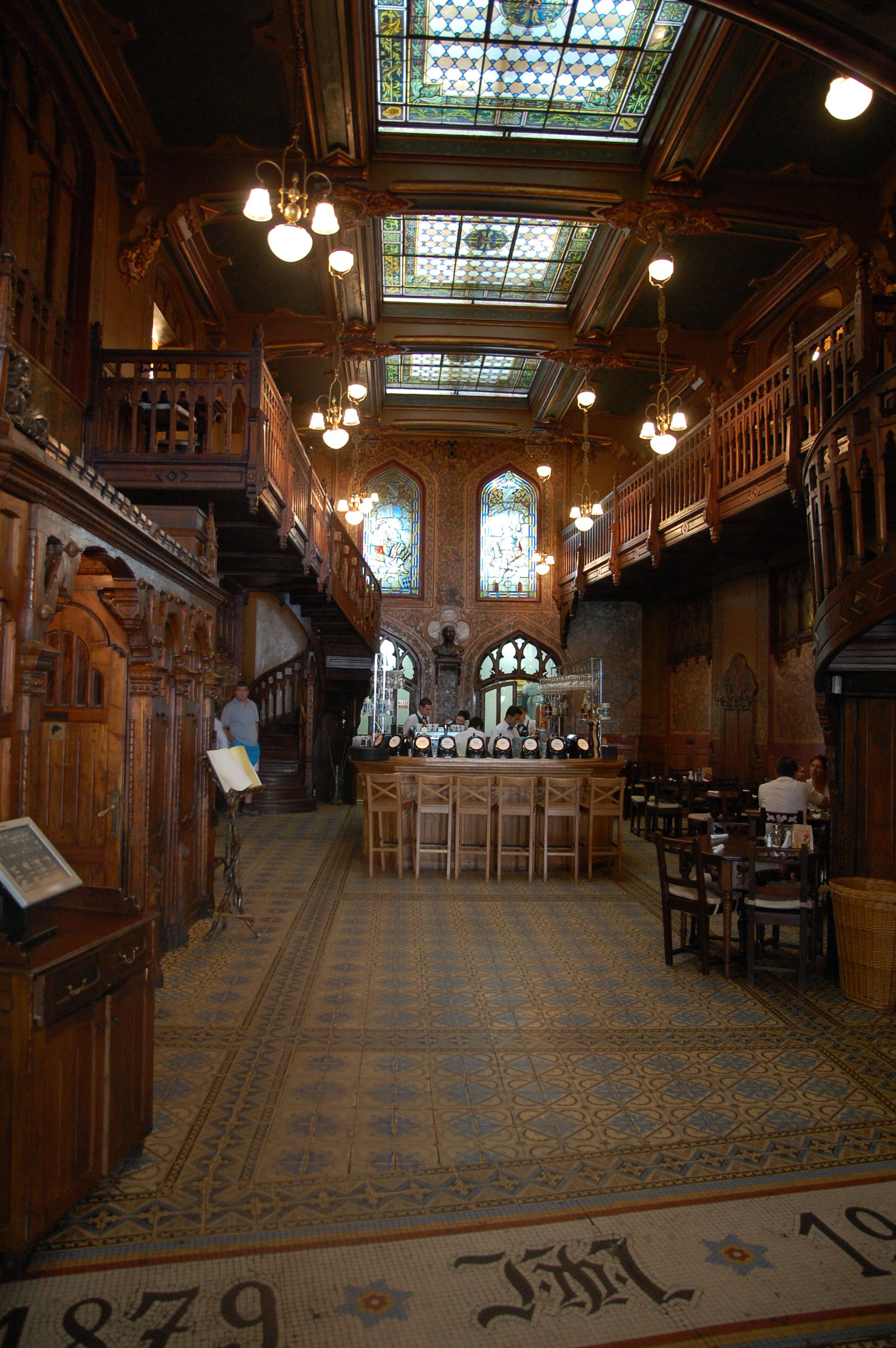

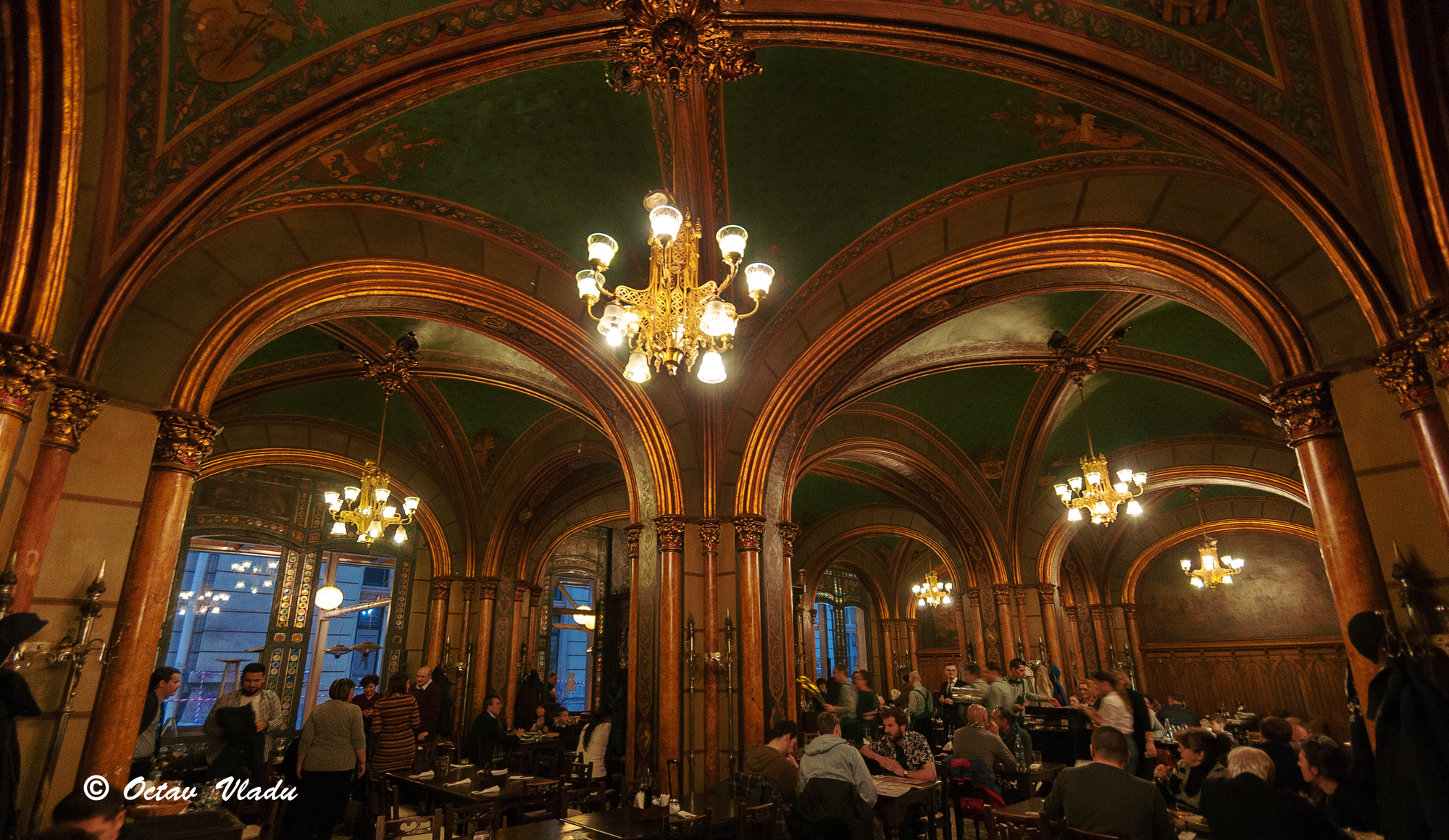

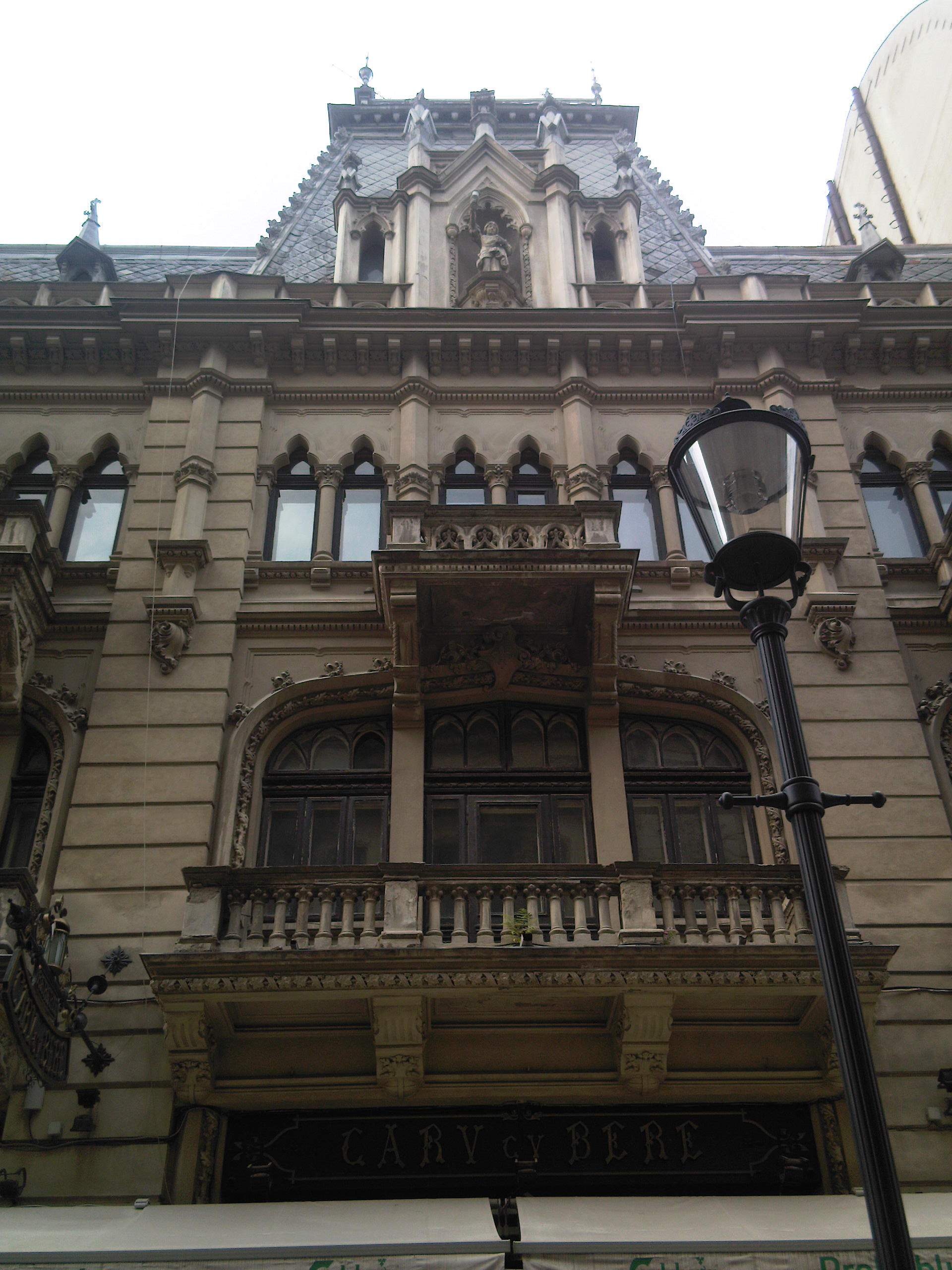

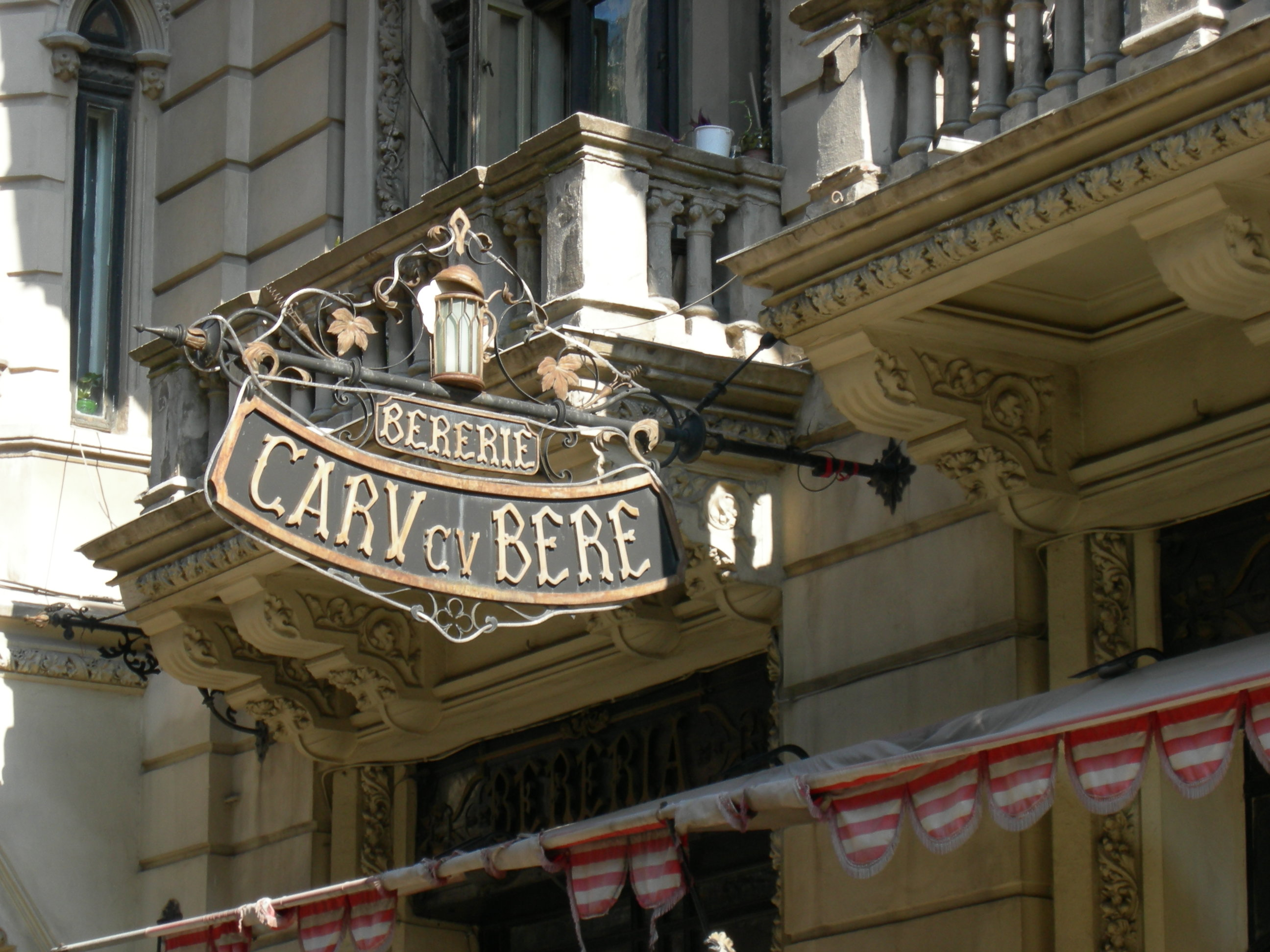

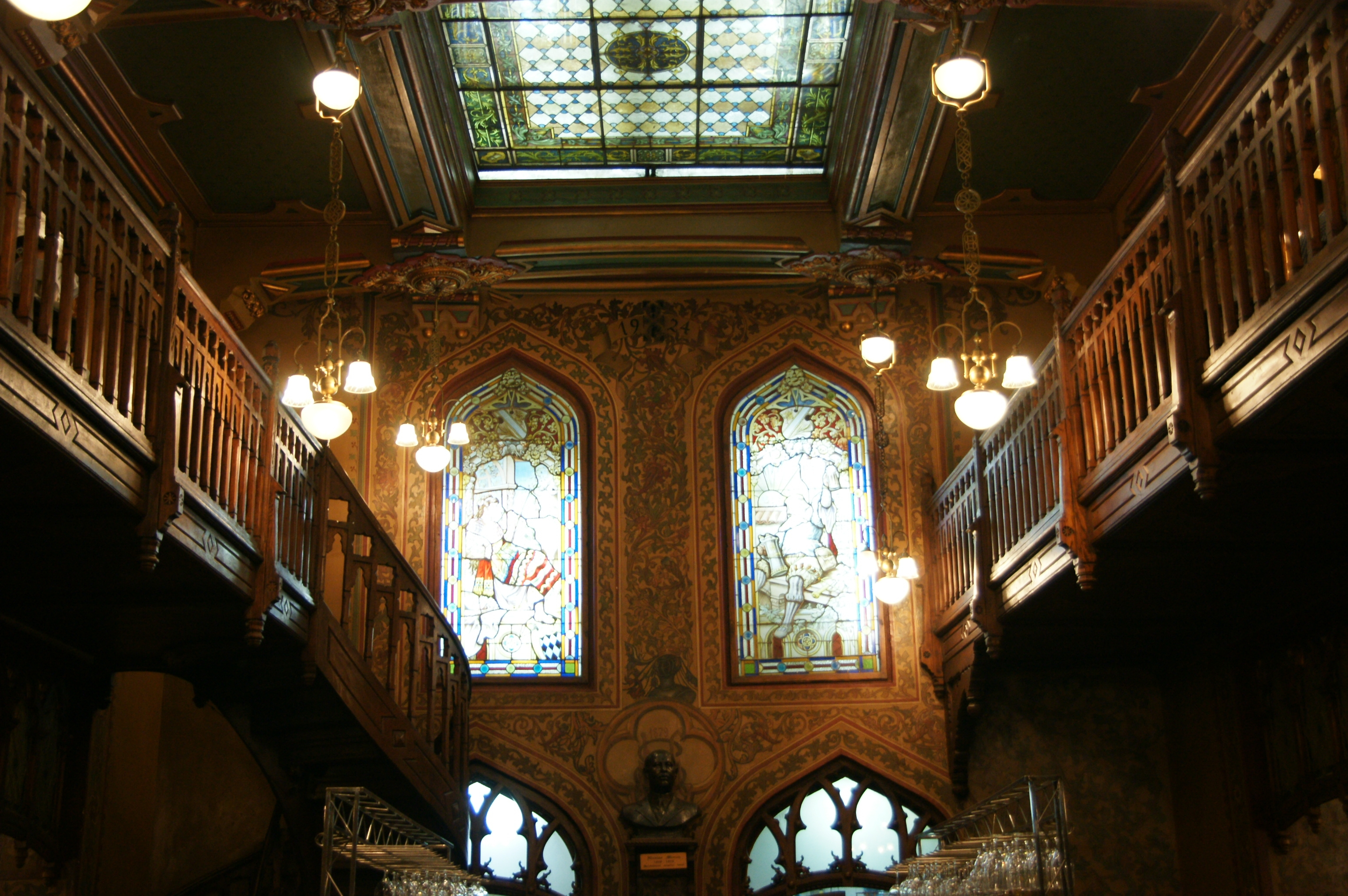
