= Mateiu Caragiale =

Romanian poet and prose writer (1885–1936)

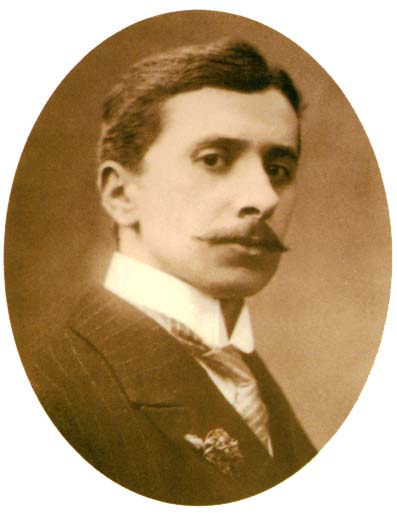
- Born: Mateiu Ion Caragiale; 25 March 1885; Bucharest, Kingdom of Romania
- Died: 17 January 1936 (aged 50); Bucharest, Kingdom of Romania
- Occupations: Poet, short story writer, novelist, visual artist, heraldist, civil servant, journalist
- Writing career
- Period: 1912–1936
- Genres: lyric poetry, fantasy, satire, detective fiction, memoir
- Movements: Symbolism, Decadence, Parnassianism, Modernism, Gândirea

Mateiu Ion Caragiale (Romanian: [maˈtej iˈon karaˈdʒjale]; 25 March [O.S. 13 March] 1885 – 17 January 1936), also credited as Matei or Matheiu, or in the antiquated version Mateiŭ, was a Romanian poet and prose writer, best known for his novel Craii de Curtea-Veche, which portrays the milieu of boyar descendants before and after World War I. Caragiale's style, associated with Symbolism, the Decadent movement of the fin de siècle, and early modernism, was an original element in the Romanian literature of the interwar period. In other late contributions, Caragiale pioneered detective fiction locally, but there is disagreement over whether his work in the field produced a complete narrative or just fragments. The scarcity of writings he left is contrasted by their critical acclaim and a large, mostly posthumous, following, commonly known as mateists.

Also known as an amateur heraldist and graphic artist, the young Caragiale published his works sporadically, seeking instead to impose himself in politics and pursuing a career in the civil service. He was associated with the Conservative-Democratic Party, and then the People's League, and ultimately raised controversy by supporting the Central Powers during their occupation of Romania. He afterwards focused on literature, and, during the late 1920s and early 1930s, published most of his prose texts in the magazine Gândirea.

The illegitimate and rebellious child of influential playwright Ion Luca Caragiale, he was the half-brother of Luca Caragiale, an avant-garde poet who died in 1921, and the posthumous son-in-law of author Gheorghe Sion. Mateiu Caragiale was loosely affiliated with Romanian Symbolism, a figure noted for his dandyism, eccentricity and Bohemianism, and, for much of his life, a regular presence in the intellectual circle formed around Casa Capșa restaurant. His associates included the controversial political figure Alexandru Bogdan-Pitești, cultural animator Mărgărita Miller Verghy, and poet Ion Barbu, who was also one of his most dedicated promoters.

== Biography ==
=== Early life ===
A native of Bucharest, he was born out of wedlock to Ion Luca Caragiale and Maria Constantinescu, an unmarried former Town Hall employee who was 21 at the time. Living his first years at his mother's house on Frumoasă Street, near Calea Victoriei (until the building was sold), Mateiu had a half-sister, his mother's daughter from another extra-conjugal affair. In 1889, almost a year after separating from his concubine, his father married Alexandrina Burelly, bringing Mateiu into his new family. In following years, he was progressively estranged from his father, and, according to Ecaterina, the youngest of Ion Luca Caragiale and Burelly's children, "Mateiu alone confronted [his father] and contradicted him systematically."

The young Caragiale was sent to school at Anghel Demetriescu's Sfântul Gheorghe College in Bucharest, where he discovered a passion for history and heraldry. At around that time, he was probably introduced to Demetriescu's circle, which included the doctor Constantin Istrati, the writer Barbu Ștefănescu-Delavrancea, the physicist Ștefan Hepites, the literary critic N. Petrașcu, and the architect Ion Mincu. During a 1901 summer trip to Sinaia, where he sojourned with the Bibescu family, Mateiu was acquainted with George Valentin and Alexandru Bibescu (in a letter he wrote at the time, he described the latter as "only too crazy and a frantic maniac"). His favorite book at age 17 was L'Arriviste, by the French novelist Félicien Champsaur, which, as he himself acknowledged, contributed to his vision of social climbing. In 1903, with Ion Luca, Burelly and their children, he traveled through large portions of Western Europe, visiting Austria-Hungary, Switzerland, Italy and France; during the trip, he recorded the impressions left on him by the various European art trends.

In 1904, his father moved to Berlin, bringing Mateiu with him—in hopes that he could be persuaded to study law at the Frederick William University—, but Mateiu spent his time reading and exploring the Imperial German capital. He would later refer to this period using a French term, l'école buissonière ("the vagrant school"), and stressed that "[it] was of great use to me". Ecaterina Caragiale indicated that one of her brother's favorite pastimes was "admiring the secular trees in the Tiergarten", and he is also known to have spent entire days at the National Gallery, especially fond of paintings by Jacob Isaakszoon van Ruisdael. Dissatisfied with Mateiu's attitude, Ion Luca sent him back to Romania in 1905, where he enrolled at the University of Bucharest Law School, but quit one year later. For a short while, Caragiale-father even entrusted Ștefănescu-Delavrancea with supervising his estranged son.

=== Father-son conflict and literary debut ===
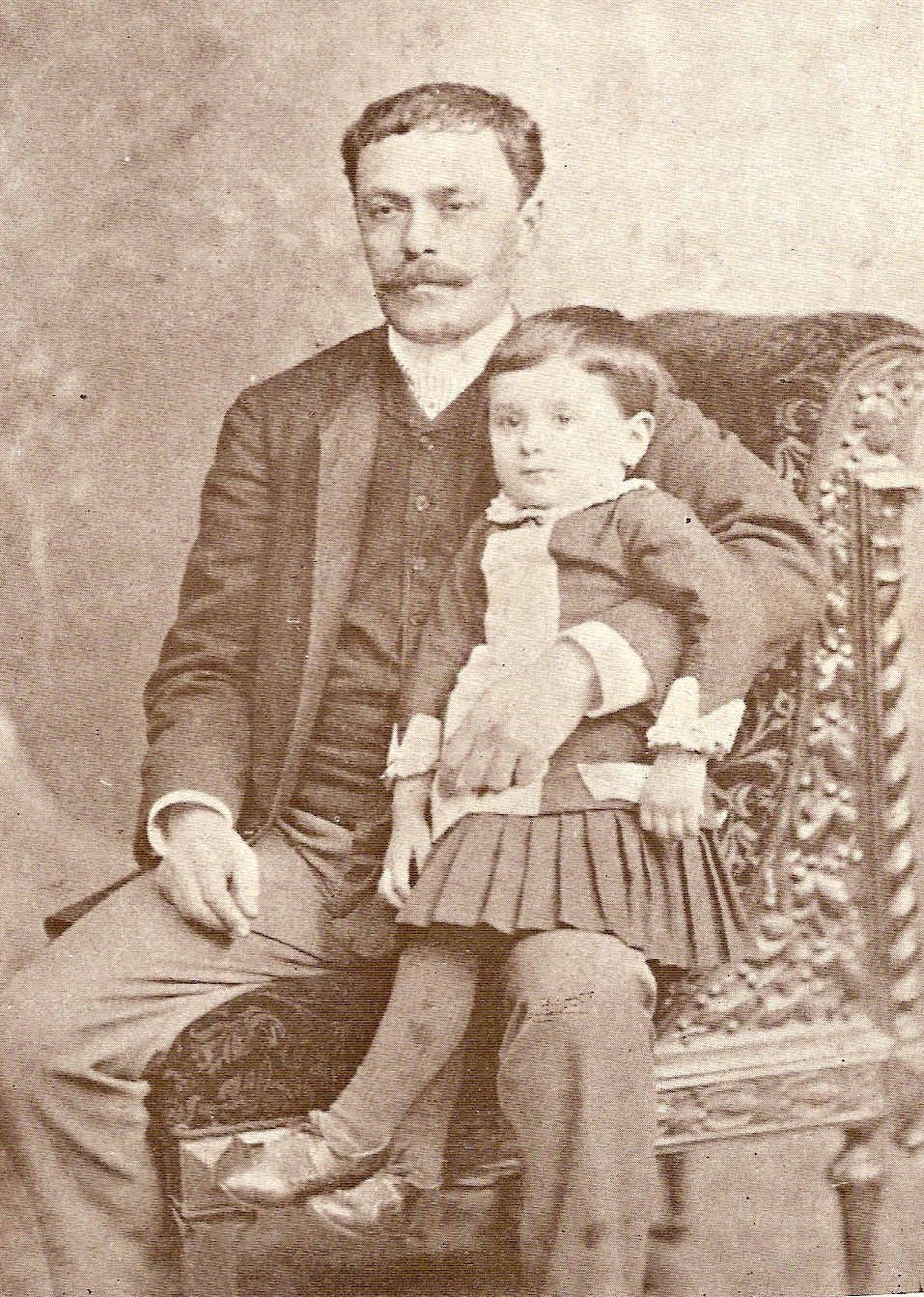
Ion Luca Caragiale holding Mateiu, ca. 1890

The conflict with his father was to prolong itself for as long as the latter was alive. Psychiatrist and essayist Ion Vianu, who explored the relationship with the tools of psychoanalysis, describes Mateiu's sentiment toward Ion Luca as "antipathy, bordering on hatred", and proposes that this reflected maternal influences from the brief period when Maria Constantinescu had been left a single parent.

The situation most likely degenerated in 1904, after the death of his aunt Lenci, when Ion Luca took over his son's inheritance, and aggravated by his father's decision to cease subsidizing him, which left the latter without a stable source of income. He was thus supposed to provide for his mother and sister, until Ion Luca transferred the inheritance resulting from the death of his other aunt Catinca Momuloaia, to his former lover. He also indicated that his father had made him attend the Frederick William University without advancing money for tuition. Some time after returning to Romania, he began attending the Symbolist literary circle formed around the poet and leftist political agitator Alexandru Bogdan-Pitești, who provided the young Caragiale with money and often invited him to supper.

In spring 1907, despite the ongoing father-son tensions, Mateiu, who was recovering from a severe form of measles, returned to Berlin, where Ion Luca's family was still residing. He soon became the lover of a local woman, an affair which reportedly caused his father to declare himself scandalized. During the same year, Mateiu Caragiale was fascinated with rumors of the Romanian Peasants' Revolt violence, recording various exaggerated news about its character and extent, and describing it as "a fine thing". In 1909, he was again enrolled at university, having decided to prepare for a graduation diploma, but again failed to complete his studies.

Mateiu Caragiale had his first thoughts on Craii de Curtea-Veche in 1910. Two years later, during a trip to Iași, he published his first 13 poems in the literary magazine Viața Românească, winning the praise of poet Panait Cerna and the ridicule of writer Tudor Arghezi. Literary critic Șerban Cioculescu stressed that these had been printed following his father's interventions with the magazine's staff, and, according to the contemporary account of Luca's brother-in-law, philosopher Ionel Gherea, Ion Luca admired his son's contributions, his criticism being minimal, constructive, and welcomed by Mateiu. This led Gherea to conclude that, copying in real life a Symbolist cliché, Caragiale-son fabricated an unfair image of his father. In later years, Mateiu continued to write poetry, published by literary promoter Constantin Banu in his magazine, Flacăra.

His father died in June 1912, which, according to Șerban Cioculescu (who cited Mateiu's correspondence), left him indifferent. By then, Caragiale-son resented Ion Luca's alleged exploitation of his popularity for material gains, and, later in the same year, commented that, "for a small fee", Caragiale-father could be persuaded to read his works at the fair in Obor. In a since-lost piece of his diary that was commented upon by Cioculescu, he also claimed that binge drinking and tobacco abuse had made his father decay physically and mentally. Despite his love for Berlin, he was also dissatisfied with his father's move to the city, and spread the rumor that, in the eyes of his family and friends, Ion Luca's departure was interpreted as "insane" (while alleging that Caragiale-father was planning to author plays in German, with assistance from Mite Kremnitz, the one-time lover of poet Mihai Eminescu). At the funeral ceremony, he reputedly shocked pianist Cella Delavrancea by coldly stating in French: Je suis venu voir feu mon père ("I came to see my late father").

=== Entry into the civil service ===
Caragiale returned to Bucharest: in summer 1912, with help from journalist Rudolf Uhrinowsky, the young writer was employed by a French-language gazette, L'Indépendance Roumaine, informing his readers that he had also become the sole legitimate Caragiale family representative in Romania. In October, he became the chief of staff in the Ministry of Public Works in the second Titu Maiorescu executive, under Minister Alexandru Bădărău. He had manifested a relative interest in politics around 1908, after his father rallied with Take Ionescu and his Conservative-Democratic Party; at the time, he criticized Ion Luca's political choices, but nonetheless noted that it could serve as a means for his own advancement ("From now on I'll have political lode [...], something certain, if there ever was certainty on Earth.") Four years after this comment, soon after making his literary debut, he clashed with his father over having considered a cabinet appointment in Ionescu's executive.

As Caragiale senior died, Mateiu initially planned to join the mainstream Conservative Party and demand a post from Grigore Gheorghe Cantacuzino, the mayor of Bucharest and a close associate of Bogdan-Pitești. Nevertheless, he came to define this position as "a bad solution", and, as Maiorescu and Ionescu formed an alliance, he successfully requested appointment from Bădărău, eventually obtaining it through the means of a decree signed by King Carol I. Caragiale later commented: "[Bădărău] entrusted me with this golden key, which I had wanted for so long, and which, for all of this, I had not been desperate to obtain." This contradicted another one of his accounts, in which he confessed that, initially received with indifference by Bădărău, he had claimed that him joining the Conservative-Democrats had been Ion Luca's dying request. Șerban Cioculescu would comment: "There could not have been a more complete distortion of a parent's last wish!"

He assumed office on November 7, 1912, but, as he later confessed, official records were modified to make it seem that he had been a civil servant since October 29. His time in office is described by critic Barbu Cioculescu as a bland affair, Mateiu having "ehausted his [political] fantasy" with his efforts to charm Bădărău. As Caragiale later recounted, he led talks with a delegation from the Kingdom of Serbia involving the initiative to build a bridge over the Danube to link the two states. In 1913, he became a Knight of the Romanian Order of the Crown (Coroana României), received the Russian Empire's Order of St. Anna 2nd Class. He was also awarded the Bene Merenti and Bărbăție și credință Romanian medals 1st Class. In 1913, Caragiale wrote the story Remember, while continuing his contributions to Viața Românească. Although his office was owed to Conservative-Democratic politics, Caragiale was still close to Bogdan-Pitești, whose daily newspaper Seara repeatedly published articles claiming to expose Take Ionescu's faction and often focused such attacks on Bădărău. His employment eventually ended on January 17, 1914, as the National Liberal cabinet of Ion I. C. Brătianu came to power. According to Ion Vianu, Caragiale was right in assuming that his marginal involvement in the political intrigues had made him a target for Bădărău's adversity.

=== World War I ===
During the early stages of World War I, as Romania remained a neutral country, Caragiale's notes record that his friend Bogdan-Pitești was acting as a political agent of the Central Powers, and that money he made available had been provided by German propaganda funds. Nevertheless, the two figures were especially close to one another during and after 1915, and, in 1916, even visited Berlin together. At the time, Caragiale also visited the Germanophile literary circle set up by Mărgărita Miller Verghy, and borrowed a reported 10,000 lei from Bogdan-Pitești, which he never returned. Caragiale's own Germanophile preferences and traditionalist conservatism had by then extinguished his cultural Francophilia, and rumors spread that he himself was a spy for the German Empire.

A frequenter of the renowned restaurant Casa Capșa, Mateiu Caragiale was constantly surrounded by a tight group of party-goers, which included Uhrinowsky and the aristocrat Gheorghe Jurgea-Negrilești. They were later joined by the Russian admiral Vessiolkin, who was allegedly the illegitimate son of Emperor Alexander III. Thanks to Uhrinowsky's intervention, Caragiale became a press correspondent for the Ottoman press agency Asmanli, a job which he held for eight months, until, as he later wrote, "the [company's] 'sweet waters' dried out". In mid summer 1916, Caragiale donated money to a fund whereby the Bellu Cemetery tomb of Ștefan Luchian, a recently deceased painter and protégé of Bogdan-Pitești, was to be decorated with a bust by sculptor Dimitrie Paciurea (the world conflict and later events prevented this from happening).

As Romania joined the Allied Powers and the Romanian Campaign began, overlooked by conscription into the Romanian Army, Caragiale drafted the first of Craii de Curtea-Veche's three sections, titled "Întâmpinarea crailor" ("Meeting the Rakes"). He would later reflect on the importance of 1916, deeming it "end of the Ancien Régime". He did not follow the authorities and Take Ionescu's supporters as they redeployed in Moldavia when southern Romania fell to the Central Powers, and remained in Bucharest. He was still active within the Germanophile circles, including those who opted for collaborationism, and was held in high regard by the occupying forces: his brother Luca was employed by the new administrative apparatus, but Mateiu's own promotion to the rank of prefect was vetoed by puppet minister Lupu Kostaki. After the government of Alexandru Marghiloman signed the May 1918 capitulation in front of the Central Powers, he made known his support for the more pro-German Conservative Party: on June 29, 1918, he and Luca were among the signers of a letter addressed to the aging Petre P. Carp, the former Conservative leader, asking him to take over rule of the country. The political choice was highly controversial, and its exposure later contributed to the end of Caragiale's political career. In a 1970 biographical essay critical of Mateiu Caragiale, Cioculescu attributed Mateiu authorship of the document, and claimed that Luca had agreed to join in only as a result of his brother's pressures.

In 1919, as Ionescu gained political influence through his alliance with the People's League, he became head of the press bureau of the minister of internal affairs, serving until 1921. Later writings of his show that he was deeply dissatisfied with the office, which he equated with "a demotion", and that he resented Ionescu not having assigned the diplomatic office of consul. He thus resigned and left the Conservative-Democrats, an action which he later defined as "a grave error". Caragiale was reputedly living in penury, holding temporary residence in various cheap houses on the outskirts of Bucharest, and being thrown out from at least one such location after failing to pay his rent. Ion Vianu believes that his exclusive focus on writing Craii... had a "therapeutic effect", in that it helped the writer deal with the situation.

Also in 1921, a first draft of his Remember saw print in Viața Românească. The second part of Craii..., "Cele trei hagialâcuri" ("The Three Pilgrimages"), was sporadically written between 1918 and 1921 (according to Caragiale himself: "it was written on restaurant tables, in the gambling den, in the meeting hall at the Justice of the Peace"). He married Marica Sion, the daughter of poet and nobleman Gheorghe Sion, in 1923, thus becoming the owner of a plot of land named Sionu, in Fundulea (although he resided in downtown Bucharest). His wife, whom he had most likely met before 1916, while attending Miller Verghy's soirées, was his senior by 25 years. Despite owning land in the country and living a comfortable life in the city, Caragiale confessed a nostalgia towards the houses he had been raised in, and especially for his mother's Bucharest home.

=== Craii de Curtea-Veche and Italian sojourn ===
Mateiu Caragiale published Remember as a volume the following year; from 1922, he began work on "Spovedanii" ("Confessions"), the third and final section of Craii..., which, as he recounted, coincided with "the most terrible crisis" of his life. Several of his poems were published in a 1925 collection edited by Perpessicius and Ion Pillat (Antologia poeților de azi), and were accompanied by an ink portrait signed Marcel Janco; at the time, Caragiale announced that he was going to publish a series of poems under the title Pajere (it was to be printed only after his death). In the 1925–1933 period, Caragiale's notes show that he was seeing his life as marked by existential cycles and crucial moments.

In March 1926-October 1928, Tudor Vianu's Gândirea magazine published his novel Craii de Curtea-Veche as a series. He completed the last additions to the text in November 1927, as its first sections were already in print. As the last episode was featured by Gândirea, to widespread acclaim, he noted: "From the time when the first of its parts saw print, this work was received with unprecedented fervor in Romanian literature. For the work it required, as well as for the tiresome obsession to which it had me submitted I bear it no grudge: it is truly magnificent [...]." Literary historian Eugen Lovinescu, who criticized Gândirea's later moves towards traditionalism and a far right ideology (a turn which coincided with Vianu's departure), argued that Caragiale had been an important gain for the literary venue. In his belief, Caragiale and other "writers of talent" helped the magazine, which had no "critic of authority" at its helm.

By 1926, he rallied with the People's League, and unsuccessfully asked Octavian Goga to assign him a candidature for a Parliamentary seat during the elections of that year. In January 1928, he again became pursuing a career in the diplomatic service, and sought an appointment for himself at the Romanian consulate in Helsinki, Finland; he thus visited Foreign Minister Nicolae Titulescu in Italy, at Sanremo. His passage through Lombardy coincided with major floods, an event recorded with interest in his private notes. Titulescu received him at the Miramare Hotel, but talks between them were inconclusive. According to Perpessicius, the failure was generated by the adversity other politicians had towards Caragiale, while Ion Vianu argues that the ambition itself had constituted proof of "perfect utopianism". The writer was nonetheless pleased with his visit, having been deeply impressed by the Italian landscape, and, as a result, attempted to create an atmosphere of, in his words, "profound Italian rustic quietude" on his property in Fundulea. His diary also perpetuated the rumor according to which Titulescu was a cocaine addict.

His political projects were put on hold, and Caragiale instead concentrated his energy on obtaining the French Légion d'honneur order, eventually becoming one of its Chevaliers in December 1929. The Romanian author himself noted that this had been made possible by the intercession of François Lebrun, the Bucharest correspondent of Le Matin newspaper, whom he considered a personal friend.

=== Later years and death ===
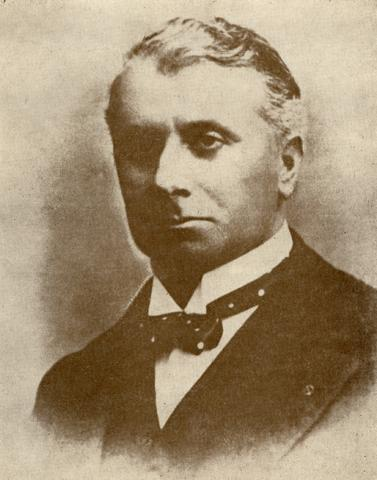
Photograph of the aging Caragiale

Caragiale also began work on the fragmentary writing Soborul țațelor ("The Council of Busibodies", 1929) and the detective story Sub pecetea tainei ("Under the Seal of Secrecy", 1930), but they would remain unfinished. In its first draft, Sub pecetea tainei was published by Gândirea in April 1930-April 1933, while Soborul țațelor was kept in three different variants. In a 1985 essay later published as a preface for Sub pecetea tainei, literary critic Nicolae Manolescu proposed that, while the story was not given a finishing touch, its plot was meant to seem ambiguous, and thus had led other commentators to wrongly assume that the text ended abruptly.

In 1931, the writer was still hoping for a return to the political stage, this time with the Nationalist Democratic Party, which came to power under Nicolae Iorga. To this goal, he approached Internal Affairs Undersecretary Nicolae Ottescu, requesting appointment as prefect, but was refused. During the same period, Caragiale was occasionally involved in events affecting the cultural scene. In May 1930, he was present at a banquet in honor of Italian author Filippo Tommaso Marinetti, the ideologue of Futurism. Organized by the Romanian Writers' Society and the Italo-Romanian Cultural Association, it was also attended by many other cultural figures, most of which, including artist Marcel Janco and the writers Ion Vinea, Jacques G. Costin, Ion Minulescu and Camil Petrescu, were associates of the magazine Contimporanul. In January 1934, linguist and publisher Alexandru Rosetti signed a contract with Caragiale, through which the latter agreed to complete Sub pecetea tainei and have it published by Rosetti's Editura Fundațiilor Regale.

He ceased most literary activities later in the year, and confessed in his diary: "My spiritual state is probably the same as that of people who feel their final hour nearing and lose all hope". The writer was probably planning to move out of the city and into Fundulea, breaking all connections with his peers. Despite this abrupt change, Caragiale had not entirely abandoned his writing career. In 1931, the Oradea-based cultural magazine Cele Trei Crișuri published his memoir, titled Vechi impresii de spectator ("Old Impressions of a Spectator"). In it, Caragiale stated having reached "a serene maturity", and indicated: "I now placidly begin the rhythm of a new life." He was planning to write a biography of Albrecht Joseph Reichsgraf von Hoditz, an extravagant Silesian nobleman of the 18th century, who is briefly mentioned in "Cele trei hagialâcuri", and was also interested in the works of two French classics, Antoine Furetière and Honoré de Balzac. He was preoccupied with death, which he feared greatly. In early 1935, soon after reading Stefan Zweig's texts on faith healing, he recorded the effect it had on his life as "the revelation of my intellectual superiority, my intuition and my power of reflection, as well as the latent forces that I feel at the foundation of my being." He also made a point of renouncing his hectic lifestyle, giving up alcohol and coffee.

Mateiu Caragiale died two years later in Bucharest, at the age 51, after suffering a stroke. Despite his explicit wish and opposition from his widow, speeches were held at his funeral ceremony, including ones by Alexandru Rosetti and Adrian Maniu. Rosetti and Eugen Lovinescu later recounted an unusual incident sparked by the event: Iancu Vulturescu, a friend of Caragiale's and frequenter of Casa Capșa, looked intensely upon the dead body as he was paying his respects; later in the evening, he committed suicide in a hotel room.

== Outlook and personal life ==
=== Views and mannerisms ===
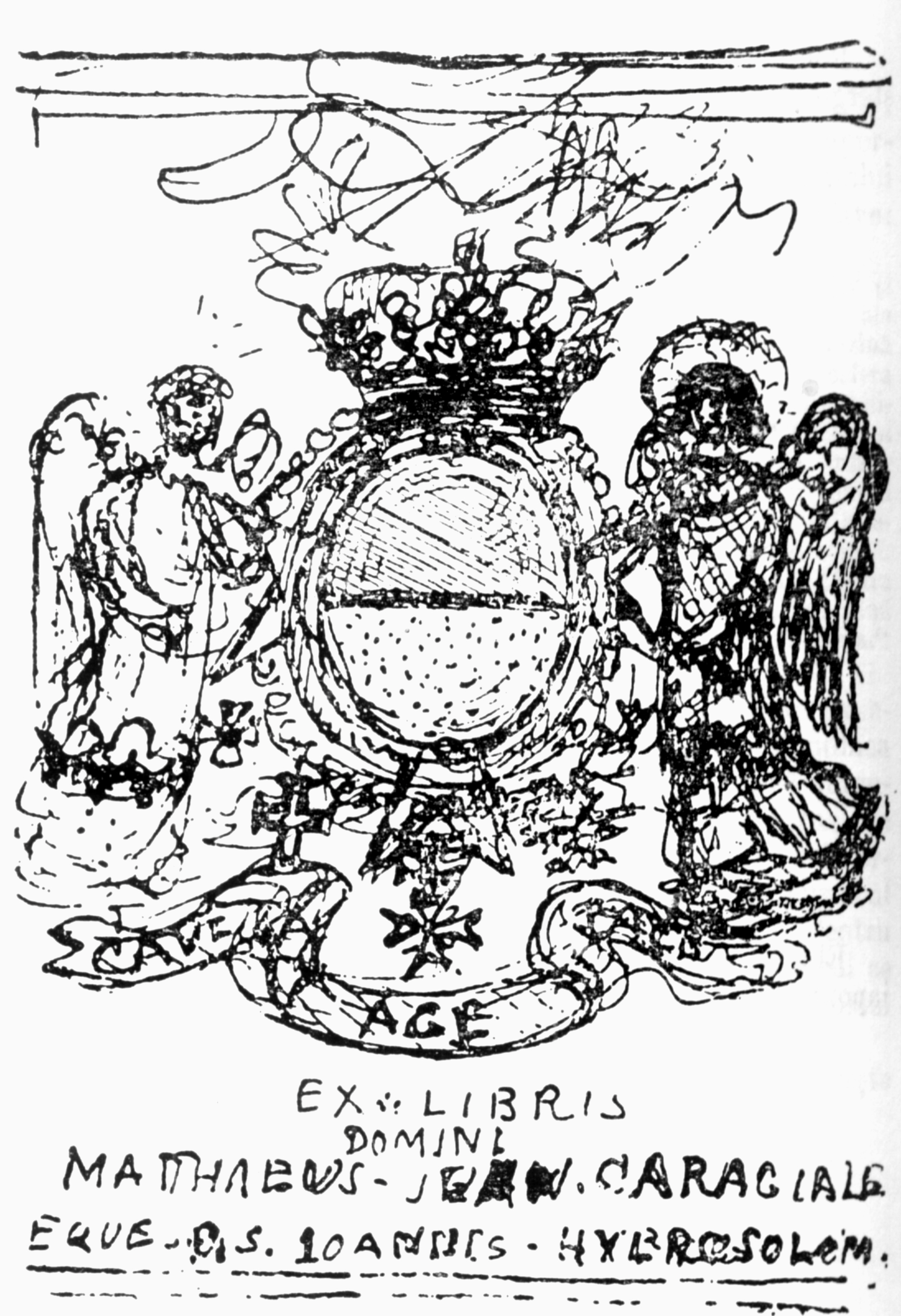
Caragiale's bookplate, drawn in his own hand and showing the coat of arms he had designed for himself

Mateiu Caragiale's interest in heraldry and genealogy mirrored his tastes and outlook on the world, which have been described as "snobbery", "aestheticism", and "dandyism", as well as the love of history he displayed throughout his career. It was sparked during his college years, when he would fill his notebooks with sketches of blazons, and as attested by various drawings he produced throughout his life. He also developed an enduring curiosity for astronomy, magic, as well as botany and agronomy, and kept detailed notes recording the deaths of all Romanian aristocrats who were his contemporaries.

These skills, as well as his tastes and talents as a causeur, consolidated his reputation as an erudite in spite of his lack of formal studies. The cultivation of aesthetic goals had seemingly guided the writer throughout his life—the poet and mathematician Ion Barbu, who was one of Caragiale's greatest admirers, recounted with amazement that the writer would periodically visit the Romanian Academy's just to look over a certain page in a manual of arithmetics outlining the rule of three (he reportedly said to Barbu: "Remembering its splendor provides me with a ceaseless drive to reread it"). At the same time, he was attracted by esotericism, alchemy and mystical subjects such as numerology, all of which form background elements in his prose.

A characteristic of Mateiu Caragiale's life was his search for noble origins, contrasting his illegitimate status. According to historian Lucian Nastasă, it clashed with his father's discreetness in relation to his Greek ancestors—Ion Luca is known to have described his own origins as uncertain, even though these had been well recorded, and to have later commented that any noble lineage in Romania relied on spurious genealogies. Caragiale-father is also thought to have discouraged his son's claims, and to have mockingly noted that their own family's origin could not have been aristocratic. Early in his youth, Mateiu jokingly referred to himself as "Prince Bassaraba-Apaffy", mixing the title used by the early Basarab Wallachian princes and the Apaffy family of Hungarian nobility. Letters he wrote while still a student show that he was envisaging a marriage of convenience as a means to increase his wealth and status.

In his permanent search for nobility rights, occasionally ascribed to the inferiority complex of illegitimate children, he indicated that his mother's origins were in Austria-Hungary: before his marriage to Marica Sion, he claimed that he had lost his birth certificate, and, upon completing a new one, that his mother resided in Vienna, and that he himself had been born in the Transylvanian town of Tușnad. In Tudor Vianu's view, Caragiale's quest for "an elective heredity" saw him joining a diverse group of writers with similar interests, among whom were Balzac, Arthur de Gobineau, and Stefan George. Commenting that "heredity has, after all, only the value of a psychological fact", he stressed: "[Caragiale] thus had the right to seek his ancestry on the ascents of history and even to be ready to believe, from time to time, that he had found it."

Between 1907 and 1911, Caragiale studied Romanian heraldry and, to this goal, read Octav-George Lecca's Familii boierești române ("Romanian Boyar Families"). Many of the comments added by him to his copy of the book are polemic, sarcastic, or mysterious, while the sketches he made on the margin include portrayals of boyars being put to death in various ways, as well as caricatures (such as a blazon displaying a donkey's head, which he mockingly assigned to Octav-George Lecca himself). Several of the heraldic objects he created were destined for his own use. In June 1928, he raised a green over yellow ensign he created for the Caragiale family at his property in Fundulea. He also hoisted other symbols, including the flag of Hungary, which, he claimed, underlined his foreign origin.

Other eccentricities Caragiale adopted included wearing a "princely gown" of his own design, developing unusual speech patterns, as well as a noted love for decorations—official honors which he tried to obtain for himself on several occasions, culminating in the Légion d'honneur award. He took special pride in noting that, after 14 months of governmental service, he had received the Romanian Order of the Crown and the other medals. His major regret in this respect was not having received Finland's Order of the White Rose, having earlier claimed that he had refused the Serbian Kingdom's Order of St. Sava when it was offered to him with a rank lower than he had asked. Ion Vianu argues that, intimately aware of his genealogical claims being questionable, the writer sought to compensate by finding his way into meritocratic environments.

=== Alleged disorders and sexuality ===
Mateiu Caragiale's personal life has for long attracted interest for the traces it left in his literary work. This is enhanced by his reputation for being a secretive man. In a late interview, Cella Delavrancea described him as "made up of [...] small patches, so well sewn together that one never knew what he had said, what he had meant to say, what he is thinking." While Ionel Gherea suspected that Caragiale was merely acting, Eugen Lovinescu, who described Caragiale's personality as "bizarre", also referred to him as "colorful and sterile." Despite his hectic lifestyle, Caragiale feared poverty and lashed out at Bohemianism, stressing that "it kills, and many times not just figuratively". In tandem, fragments of his writings and private records are thought by cultural historian Andrei Oișteanu to show intimate familiarity with substance abuse and the drug subculture of his age, in addition to his self admitted binge drinking. During his final years of life, he was harvesting an unspecified wild herb from the hills of Cotroceni neighborhood, and using it as a sedative. By then, essayist Ion Vartic notes, Caragiale's obsession with death had developed into "neurosis".

Several contemporary accounts focus on Mateiu's unusual preferences in clothing, pointing to a studied extravagance first adopted during his stay in Berlin, and in support of which he was reportedly spending more than he could afford. Literary historian George Călinescu recalled having seen a middle-aged Caragiale taking walks through downtown Bucharest: amused by the writer's everyday clothes, which he depicted as of an archaic fashion and slightly deteriorated, compared him to "a butler on Sunday leave". Călinescu also told that, during winter, Caragiale would only touch metal with his hand while wearing suede gloves. Rosetti and poet Ștefana Velisar both recorded being amused by aspects of Caragiale's clothing, such as his oversized boots and his using scissors to cut out the worn out extremities of his trouser legs. In 1926, the writer began wearing a ring bearing the seal of Mercury, which, Vartic supposes, evidenced his trust in the psychopomp god's powers.

Caragiale's secrecy and eccentricity is credited with having marked his personal life and sexuality, often with dramatic consequences. In support of this, Ion Vianu cites the writer's alleged disdain for his mother, referencing a claim made by the socialite Grigore "Grigri" Ghica. The latter, familiar with Miller Verghy and her circle, recounted that the poverty-stricken but proud Caragiale had asked their common female friend to allow him use of a stable on her property, explaining that he was going to have furniture moved in. According to Ghica, the owners were shocked to discover that the stable had been used instead to accommodate Maria Constantinescu. Ion Vianu also notes that Caragiale "appears to have been in love for just one moment", referring to his 1907 pursuit of an upper-class French girl, Fernande de Bondy, who rejected his advances and complained to Caragiale-father. For a while in 1908, Caragiale had a brief affair with a reportedly unattractive Frenchwoman, Mariette Lamboley, who had been a Roman Catholic nun. In letters he sent to his close friend, Nicolae Boicescu, Caragiale bragged about his sexual exploits with Lamboley, and of having exposed her to "the most terrifying sadisms" (which included allowing her to be raped by a stranger in the Cișmigiu Gardens).

Notes in his diaries show that he discreetly resented Alexandru Bogdan-Pitești, although, Ion Vianu stresses, such pronouncements appear to have become a staple of Caragiale's private records only long after Bogdan-Pitești had died. Aside from claiming to expose his patron's alleged financing by the Central Powers before and during World War I, Caragiale discussed Bogdan-Pitești's homosexuality in disparaging terms (calling him "a blusterer of the anti-natural vice"), and even laying out a plan to rob his residence. The violent solution to poverty, Ion Vianu proposes, may have reflected his appreciation for Félicien Champsaur's L'Arriviste, in which the protagonist uses murder to affirm himself socially. Despite Caragiale's relationships with women and his lapses into homophobia, Ion Vianu argues (partly building on similar comments made by literary historian Matei Călinescu) that the writer had a preference for homosociality or even homoeroticism, both in line with his narcissism. Caragiale's diary also dealt with Bogdan-Pitești's wife, the socialite Domnica, depicting her as an immoral woman. A person known by the initials A.K., who was probably the same as Domnica, is referred to in such notes as being in a ménage à trois situation with Bogdan-Pitești and Caragiale. He confessed being thankful that the long record of sums he had borrowed from Bogdan-Pitești beginning 1916 had been destroyed, probably by Domnica, at a time when his patron was on his deathbed.

Mateiu Caragiale's final erotic pursuit was the high society lady and amateur singer Eliza "Elise" Băicoianu. He courted her for a few months in 1932, despite being married to Marica Sion. His private notes show that he struggled with the lust for Băicoianu, which he believed was impairing his judgment, and declared himself outraged that the object of his affection had a "scandalous liaison" with another man. He ultimately decided not to persevere, basing himself on the principle that "business is business." In his final years, Caragiale was weighing in the probability of his still fathering a male son, and, although he concluded that it was not likely, laid out a "Family Law" for his potential descendants to abide by.

== Work ==
=== Literary style ===
Writing shortly after Caragiale died, Tudor Vianu defined him as "a figure, possibly a delayed one, from that aesthetic generation of around 1880, who professed a concept of the supremacy of artistic values in life." This allowed him to draw a parallel between Mateiu Caragiale and Alexandru Macedonski, the doyen of Romanian Symbolism, with the one essential difference provided by their level of involvement in cultural affairs. Unlike his half-brother Luca, Caragiale tended to stay away from the literary movements of his age, and placed his cultural references in the relative past, being inspired by Romantic and Symbolist authors such as Edgar Allan Poe, Auguste Villiers de l'Isle-Adam, Jules Amédée Barbey d'Aurevilly, Charles Baudelaire and José María de Heredia. Noting the manifest difference in style between the realist Ion Luca and his two sons, Vianu pointed out that the three shared, as characteristic traits, "The cultivation of fully-developed forms, the view of art as a closed system resistant to the anarchic forces of reality". According to Cioculescu, Mateiu's work would be "minor, unless placed alongside that of Ion Luca Caragiale". Elsewhere, Cioculescu indicated that a letter written by Mateiu Caragiale in his early youth, which featured his first pieces of social commentary, imitated his father's calligraphy to the point where George Călinescu initially believed they were the work of Ion Luca. Literary critic Paul Cernat proposes that the clashes between father and son evidenced Mateiu's "maternal attachment and a break with paternal authority", and, in particular, his "Oedipus complex", which he also sees manifested in the personality of modern Romanian writers such as the avant-garde founding figure Urmuz and the co-founder of Dadaism, Tristan Tzara.

Discussing Mateiu Caragiale's originality, Călinescu saw in him "a promoter (maybe the first) of literary Balkanism, that greasy mix of obscene phrases, lascivious impulses, awareness of an adventurous and fuzzy genealogy, everything purified and seen from above by a superior intelligence". In relation to Romanian literature, he believed to have discovered a common trait of "Balkan" writers of mostly Wallachian origin, citing Mateiu Caragiale in a group that also included Caragiale-father, the early 19th century aphorist and printer Anton Pann, the modern poets Tudor Arghezi, Ion Minulescu and Ion Barbu, and Urmuz. He went on to define this gathering as "the great grimacing sensitive ones, buffoons with just too much plastic intelligence." In parallel, Lovinescu saw Caragiale as one in a group of modernist prose writers who sought to reshape the genre through the use of lyricism, and were thus paradoxically outdated by 20th-century standards. The delayed character of Caragiale's contribution was also mentioned by literary historian Ovid Crohmălniceanu, who identified its roots in Art Nouveau and, through it, the subjects of Byzantine art.

Among other traits which set Caragiale apart from his fellow Romanian writers was his highly creative vocabulary, partly reliant on archaisms and words occurring rarely in the modern Romanian lexis (including ones borrowed from Turkish and Greek, or even from Romani). In certain cases, he used an inventive spelling—for example, he consistently rendered the word for "charm", farmec, as fermec. Tudor Vianu noted that this habit was similar to experiments presents in Ion Barbu's cryptic poetry, ascribing both cases to "the intent of underlining the differentiation between the written and the spoken words", while Ion Vianu defined Caragiale as "an accurate artisan of the language, an extraordinary connaisseur of the Romanian language, which, out of snobbery, he sets aside for the plebeian readers." Craii de Curtea-Veche introduces a large array of words present in early 20th century slang and Romanian profanity, as well as rendering the then-common habit of borrowing whole sentences from French to express oneself (a trait notably present in Mateiu Cargiale's own day-to-day vocabulary). The novel's tone, often irreverent, and the book's foray into the mundane have been seem by some as tributary to the informal style cultivated by Bogdan-Pitești.

Most of Caragiale's prose is interconnected through allusions to himself, and, occasionally, the narratives discreetly refer to one another. Although his texts are characterized by precision in defining the moment and location for the plot, the general lines of the narratives are often subject to a calculated fragmentation, an innovative technique which, Vartic writes, attests the author's familiarity with Antoine Furetière's vision. Vartic also indicates that Balzac's La Comédie humaine, in particular its Thirteen cycle—which is known to have been one of the books Caragiale treasured most—, influenced the general structure of his stories.

=== Novel ===
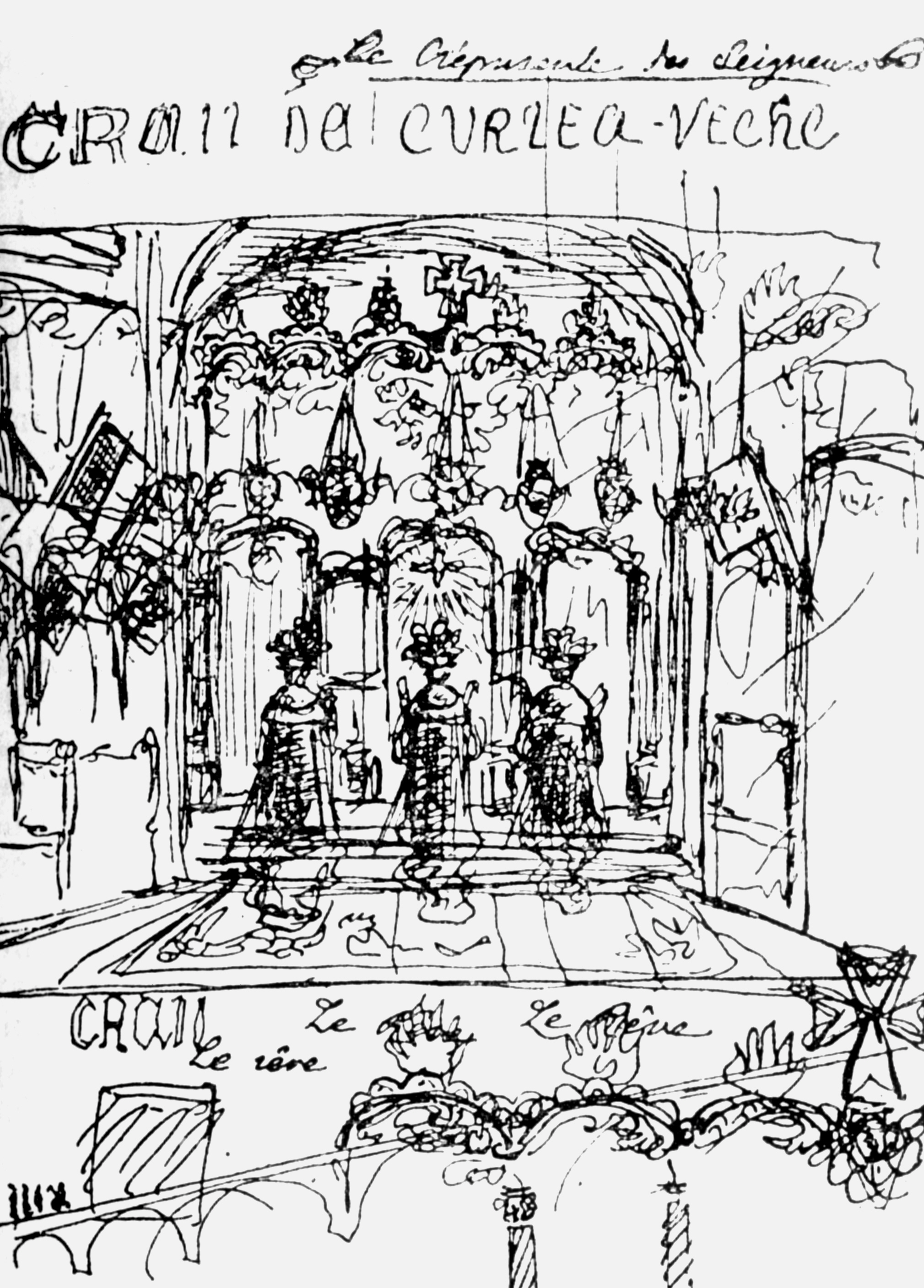
Mateiu Caragiale's illustration to his Craii de Curtea-Veche

A first-person narrative, Craii de Curtea-Veche traces and satirizes Romanian society in the early decades of the 20th century (it probably depicts events from ca. 1910). A core group of three persons, all withdrawn, Epicurean and decadent figures, allow the intrusion of Gore Pirgu, a low-class and uncultured self-seeker, whose character comes to embody the new political class of Greater Romania. Researcher Constantin Amăriuței proposed that there is an intrinsic connection between Pirgu and Mitică, a voluble clerk depicted in several sketch stories by Ion Luca Caragiale, and best remembered as a stereotype of Bucharesters; according to Amăriuței, Pirgu is "the eternal and real Mitică of the Romanian world". According to Matei Călinescu, the story is intertextually shaped by two of Ion Luca's prose works: one of them, titled Inspecțiune... ("Inspection..."), is part of the Mitică cycle, while the other, Grand Hotel "Victoria română", is one of the earliest depictions of anxiety in the literature of Romania. For Matei Călinescu, Pirgu and the other protagonists stand as allegories for a set of essentially Romanian traits that, he argues, were still observable in the early 21st century.

In direct reference to Craii..., George Călinescu wrote: "Reality is transfigured, it becomes fantastical and a sort of Edgar Poe-like unease agitates [the main characters], these good-for-nothings of the old Romanian capital." This, he argued, validated placing Caragiale's novel among Surrealist writings, and alongside the works of eclectic authors such as Barbu and Ion Vinea. Literary historian Eugen Simion notes that Barbu believed himself thought Caragiale's prose was equal in value to the poetry of Romania's national poet Mihai Eminescu, and argues that this perspective was exaggerated.

Writing in 2007, Cernat also noted a similarity between Vinea's 1930 collection of novellas, Paradisul suspinelor ("The Paradise of Sighs"), and Caragiale's Craii..., defining the two books as "poetic, mannerist and fantastic", and stressing that they both portray decadent characters. Building on the observations of his older colleague Simion Mioc, Cernat commented that Vinea, Mateiu Caragiale, N. Davidescu and Adrian Maniu, all members of the same "post-Symbolist" generation, ultimately traced their inspiration to Alexandru Macedonski and his Symbolist work Thalassa, Le Calvaire de feu. He also proposed that, less directly, Macedonski's themes and style also influenced similar prose works by Arghezi and Urmuz.

Several critics and researchers have pointed out that, in Craii..., Caragiale used characters and dialogues to illustrate his own worldview and historical points of reference. Among the rich cultural references present in the novel, Șerban Cioculescu identified various direct or hidden portrayals of Caragiale's contemporaries, several of which point to his own family. Thus, Cioculescu argued, the character Zinca Mamonoaia is the writer's step aunt Catinca Momuloaia, while an entire passage sheds a negative light on Ion Luca (the unnamed "leading writer of the nation" who prostitutes his trade). Commenting on the brief mention of one of Pirgu's associates, "the theosophist Papura Jilava", the critic concluded that it most likely referred to novelist and traveler Bucura Dumbravă.

Cioculescu identifies several other characters, including Pirgu and two secondary characters, the journalist Uhry and the homosexual diplomat Poponel, were Caragiale's companions: the latter two were based, respectively, on Uhrinowsky and a member of "an old Oltenian family". Ion Vianu, who believes the unnamed narrator is a projection of Caragiale's ego, emphasizes connections between the various characters and other real-life persons, including Ion Luca, Bogdan-Pitești and Anghel Demetriescu. In addition, Barbu Cioculescu believed to have identified other traits shared by the narrator and author, as well as a covert reference to Marica Sion, while researcher Radu Cernătescu suggests further allusions to real-life eccentric noblemen, from Pantazi Ghica to "Claymoor" Văcărescu. Perpessicus noted that, in one of his outbursts, the character Pașadia criticizes the Brâncovenesc style developed in 17th century Romanian art (which he contrasts with "the tumultuous flowering of the baroque"), only to have the narrator speak out against him; in the process, the reader is informed about Caragiale's own tastes.

=== Other prose works ===
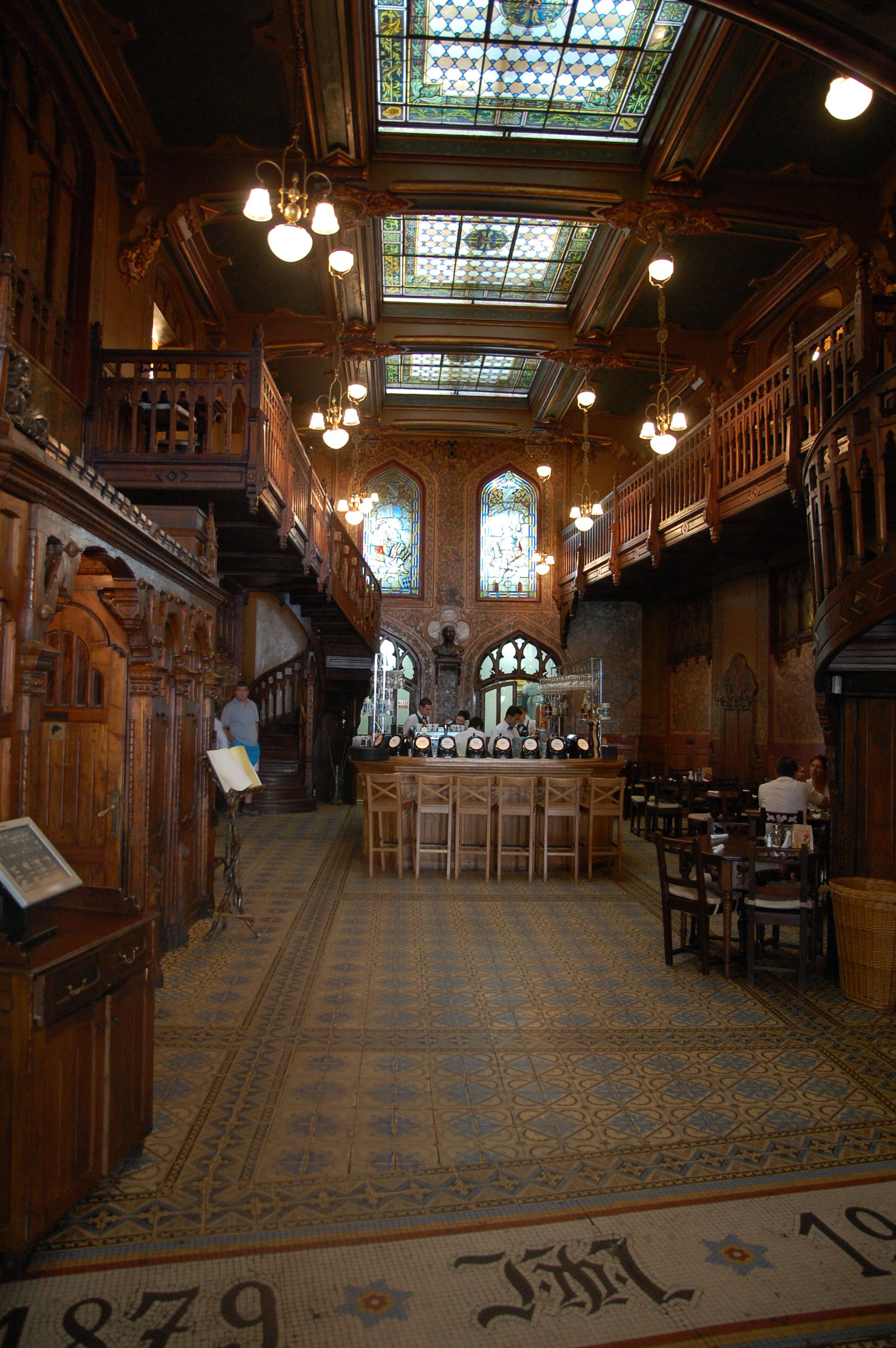
Caru cu bere restaurant, setting for Caragiale's Sub pecetea tainei

Remember is a fantasy novella set in Berlin, depicting dramatic events in the life of dandy Aubrey de Vere. Perpessicius argued that the main protagonist was "taken, apparently, from a short story by Oscar Wilde", while others noted a direct reference to the 19th century writer Aubrey de Vere, an indirect one to Poe's Lenore (the lyric: "And, Guy de Vere, hast thou no tear?- weep now or nevermore!"), or a partial anagram of the name Barbey d'Aurevilly. The mysterious events standing at the center of the writing have been interpreted by several critics as an allusion to de Vere's homosexuality. Probably taking place in 1907, it contrasts Caragiale's other, more tenebrous, writings of its kind—one of its main traits is the writer's nostalgia towards the German capital, which serves to give the story an atmospheric rather than narrative quality. Its depiction of hallucinatory visions probably owes inspiration to Gérard de Nerval, while, according to historian Sorin Antohi, the main character is reminiscent of Joris-Karl Huysmans' Des Esseintes (see À rebours). Lovinescu praises the story for "the gravity of its tone, [...] the cadence of its sumptuous, cultured and noble style." George Călinescu, who referred to the narrative as "a pastiche", and to Berlin as portrayed in Caragiale's story as "a Berlin-Sodom", concluded that the text allowed readers to form "the direct sensation" of Bucharest as a "Balkan Sodom" to be discerned from the German landscape.

Caragiale's Sub pecetea tainei has been the subject of debates in the literary community. One disagreement refers to its nature: some see it as a standalone novella, while others, including Alexandru George, view it as an unfinished novel. In this context, a singular position was held by Ovid Crohmălniceanu, who believed that Caragiale was building up to a sequel of his Craii.... The other point of contention involves its artistic value. Ovidiu Cotruș saw the story as proof that Mateiu Caragiale was running out of "narrative resourcefulness" and creating "the [writing] most detached from his work's obsessions", while Șerban Cioculescu deplored Caragiale's move to abandon work on Soborul țațelor (which he considered a more promising venture) in order to "implant a sort of Romanian detective novel".

Written as a frame story, Sub pecetea tainei comprises the recollections of Teodor "Rache" Ruse, a retired Police officer. Punctuated by willing omissions, for which rows of ellipses are employed, the text is structured into accounts of three unsolved cases: that of a missing person, the clerk Gogu Nicolau, who may or may not have been murdered by his wife; that of an epileptic minister whom Ruse is supposed to guard and who, after going missing and returning, presents his resignation and dies, leaving the general public clueless as to his fate; finally, that of a Viennese couple of con artists and presumed murderers (one of whom may be a transvestite woman) whose arrival in Bucharest poses a threat on the life of their female host, Lena Ceptureanu. Ruse's accounts, which oblique references in the text seem to place in 1930, form part of his conversations with the unnamed narrator, which are set in Caru cu bere restaurant and in the narrator's Bucharest home; this, Manolescu notes, echoes scenes in Craii.... A recurring element in the plot is the role played by secretive women, who may be directly or indirectly responsible for the deaths of male characters. Commentators have since attempted to match several of the protagonists with real people in Caragiale's life. Such theories identify Rache Ruse himself with Cantuniari, a policeman whom Caragiale had befriended, the minister with the leading Conservative Party member Alexandru Lahovary, and the female character Arethy with Miller Verghy.

According to Manolescu, Mateiu Caragiale took direct inspiration from foreign works of detective fiction when outlining his story, but also mocked their conventions by having Ruse rely on literature and even cartomancy for his crime solving techniques. Vartic drew a parallel between Caragiale's style and that of two 20th-century foreign authors of crime fiction—Dashiell Hammett and Giorgio Bassani. The general intent, Manolescu notes, is not in realistically depicting police procedures, but in showing "the human mystery." Thus, Ion Vartic argues, Gogu Nicolau may be Caragiale's attempt to see himself from the outside, and his disappearance may be a clue that the writer was planning to sever links with the cultural milieu. The work's title and its generic meaning are found in Ruse's final statement: "There are such things meant to always remain—since forever—under the seal of secrecy."

=== Poetry ===
Caragiale's Symbolist poems, including a series of sonnets, also display his profound interest in history. Pajere, which reunited all of the poems Caragiale had published in Viața Românească and Flacăra, was defined by Lovinescu as a series of "archaically-toned tableaux of our ancient existence", and by Ion Vianu as "a picturesque history of Wallachia", while George Călinescu remarks their "savant" character. The same critic also noted that Pajere, which drew inspiration from Byzantine settings, were more accomplished versions of a genre first cultivated by Dumitru Constantinescu-Teleormăneanu. According to Perpessicius, Caragiale had "a certain outlook [...], according to which the past [...] should not be sought in books, but in the surrounding landscape". He illustrated this notion with a stanza from Caragiale's Clio:

Dar ceața serii îneacă troianele de jar.
Atunci mergi de te-așează sub un bătrân stejar,
Ascultă mândrul freamăt ce-n el deșteaptă vântul,

Ca-n obositu-ți suflet de vrajă răzvrătiți,
Când negrul văl al nopții înfășură pământul,
În geamăt să tresalte străbunii adormiți.

Translation:

But the evening's mist is flooding the heaps of embers.
Go then and sit yourself under an old oak tree,
Listen to the mighty rustling with which the wind awakens,

So that, stirred by the spell, inside your tired soul,
When the black veil of night has enveloped the earth,
The ancestors laid to rest may shudder in the moaning.

Călinescu noted that, in several of his poems, Mateiu Caragiale had infused his search for aristocratic heredities. He saw this present in the poem Lauda cuceritorului ("In Praise of the Conqueror"):

Sunt seri, spre toamnă,-adânci și strălucite
Ce, luminându-mi negura-amintirii,
Trezesc în mine suflete-adormite

De mult, încât cad pradă amăgirii,
Când cerul pârguit la zări cuprinde
Purpura toată, și toți trandafirii [...]

Translation:

Come autumn, there are deep and splendid nights
That, shedding light upon the darkness of my memory,
Awake within me souls

For long sleeping, and thus I'm cheated,
When the ripening sky envelops in its sheen
All the Tyrian purple, as well as all the roses [...]

In various pieces, the poetic language is characterized by pessimism, and, according to Barbu Cioculescu and Ion Vianu, was influenced by Romania's national poet, Mihai Eminescu. One of them, Singurătatea ("The Loneliness"), notably expresses, through the voice of its demonic protagonist, misanthropy and a vengeful attitude, believed by Vianu to stand as one of Caragiale's most personal messages on one's disappointment with the world:

Că margini nu cunoaște păgâna-mi semeție,
Afară de trufie nimic n-avut-am sfânt,
Mi-am răzbunat printr-însa întreaga seminție,
Și sub călăuzirea-i pășesc cu bărbăție
Pe-atât de aspra cale a negrului mormânt...

Translation:

For my pagan race knows no boundaries,
I held nothing sacred other than conceit,
Through it, I have avenged my entire tribe,
And under its guidance I ruggedly advance
Down that abruptest path to the dark grave...

== Legacy ==
=== Early decades ===
Caragiale continued to be hailed as a relevant writer during the ten years following his death, and his work went through new critical editions. Pajere was published in spring 1936, having been edited by Marica Caragiale-Sion and Alexandru Rosetti. Later in the year, a volume of collected works, Opere, was published by Rosetti and featured prints made by Mateiu Caragiale at various moments during his lifetime. Large portions of the diaries kept by Mateiu Caragiale are lost. The transcript made by Perpessicius was criticized for having selectively discarded much content, while originals kept by Rosetti were mysteriously lost during the Legionnaires' Rebellion of 1941. Additional notes, which notably featured Caragiale's criticism of his father, were preserved for a while by Șerban Cioculescu, before being borrowed to Ecaterina Logadi, Ion Luca's daughter, and never recovered. A significant number of his drawings and paintings, which Vianu assumed had survived by 1936, have also been misplaced.

Caragiale's work exercised some influence from early on. Ion Barbu coined the terms mateist and matein, referring, respectively, to supporters of and things connected to Caragiale's literature. Barbu is also credited with having set up and presided the first mateist circle. In 1947, Ion Barbu wrote the poem Protocol al unui Club ("The Protocol of a Club"), intended as an homage to his friend's memory. The traditionalist poet Sandu Tudor took up the genre of Byzantine portraits as cultivated by him and by Constantinescu-Teleormăneanu, creating a piece titled Comornic (roughly, "Cellar" or "Cellar-Keeper"). Around the same period, the writer known as Sărmanul Klopștock took inspiration from the style of his novels.

=== Mateism under communism ===
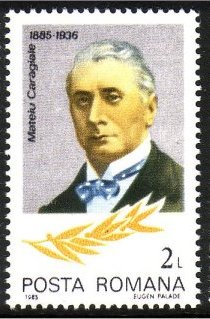
Mateiu Caragiale on a 1985 Romanian stamp

Mateism, growing during the late stages of the interwar period, took the aspect of an underground cultural phenomenon during the communist regime. Tașcu Gheorghiu, a Surrealist author whose Bohemian lifestyle was itself described as a reflection of Craii..., had memorized large sections of the novel and could recite them by heart. According to Eugen Simion, dramatist Aurel Baranga is reputed to have done the same. During communism, Gheorghiu published a translation from Giuseppe Tomasi di Lampedusa's The Leopard, which literary critic Carmen Mușat believes was marked by the tone of mateism. Caragiale's aesthetics contrasted with those of the 1950s Socialist Realist establishment. However, after the death of Soviet leader Joseph Stalin signaled a relative change in cultural tenets, Communist Party affiliate and writer Petru Dumitriu wrote in favor of recovering supposed "realistic sections" of works by both Mateiu Caragiale and Tudor Arghezi. Eugen Simion writes that, late in the same decade, students at the University of Bucharest were investing their time trying to determine the exact location of houses described in Craii.... Also according to Eugen Simion, an attempt by poet Anatol E. Baconsky to republish the volume was met with a stiff reaction from the censorship apparatus, and, as a consequence of this episode, the main Communist Party organ, Scînteia, renewed its campaign against Caragiale. Matei Călinescu recalled that, "during the dark 1950–60 decade", he clandestinely read Craii... and shared his thoughts on it with a group of friends, noting that this was part of a "secret life" which contrasted with the rigors one had to obey in public.

With the relative liberalization during the 1960s, which followed the rise of Nicolae Ceaușescu as communist leader, Caragiale's work enjoyed a more favorable reception. At that stage, nationalism and national communism became standards of official discourse, and intellectuals such as Edgar Papu were allowed to reinterpret Romanian culture on the basis of nationalist tenets: Papu's controversial theory, known as "protochronism", claimed that Romanians as a group were at the source of any innovative movement in world culture. Papu thus believed that Caragiale, whom he described as superior to Flaubert, had foreshadowed Lampedusa's writing techniques. Independent of this approach, Mateiu Caragiale was being rediscovered by new generations of writers. In 1966, Viața Românească published Radu Albala's În deal, pe Militari ("On the Hill, in Militari"), which was a sequel and final chapter of Sub pecetea tainei. Albala was significantly influenced by Caragiale throughout his work, as was his contemporary Alexandru George in his series of fiction writings. Other such authors are Fănuș Neagu, who was inspired by Craii... to write his 1976 book The Handsome Lunatics of the Big Cities, and Virgiliu Stoenescu, whose poetry, according to Barbu Cioculescu, was influenced by "the charm of word appositions" in Caragiale's poems. Caragiale's name was also cited by the writer Geo Bogza, who, in his youth, was a major figure of the Romanian avant-garde movement. In one of his late prose pieces, titled Ogarii, "The Borzois", Bogza, who praised the dog breed for its innate grace, wrote: "I do not know if Mateiu Caragiale, who thought himself so uncommon, ever owned borzois. But, if he did, I'm sure he gazed on them with melancholy and with secret envy."

During the final stages of Ceaușescu's rule, when liberalization was curbed, matein writings were rediscovered and reclaimed by the Optzeciști group of authors, themselves noted for attempting to evade cultural guidelines by adopting fantasy and avant-garde literature. Mircea Cărtărescu, a leading exponent of the Optzeciști and an advocate of Postmodernism, referred to Caragiale as one of his interwar precursors, while Ștefan Agopian acknowledged he pursued Mateiu's interests in his 1981 novel Tache de catifea ("Tache de Velvet"). According to critic Dumitru Ungureanu, it was mainly through Radu Albala that the matein model seeped into the work of various Optzeciști—Cărtărescu, Horia Gârbea and Florin Șlapac among them. Another Postmodernist author, Fundulea native Mircea Nedelciu, paid tribute to matein prose by basing a character of his 1986 novel Tratament fabulatoriu ("Confambulatory Treatment") on Caragiale, and again much later, by adopting the same practice in his final novel Zodia Scafandrului ("Sign of the Deep-sea Diver"). The isolated Postmodernist figure and former Communist Party ideologue Paul Georgescu is also believed to have used elements of Craii... as inspiration for his novels of the 1980s. In parallel, as an echo of mateism, more critics grew interested in subjects relating to Caragiale's work. Various comprehensive monographs were published after 1980, including a volume edited by the Museum of Romanian Literature and two influential works written by, respectively, Alexandru George and philosopher Vasile Lovinescu. The latter, with its claim to uncover esoteric layers in Matein texts, remains controversial.

=== Post-1989 recovery and debates ===
Caragiale was completely recovered in mainstream cultural circles after the Romanian Revolution of 1989. Craii de Curtea-Veche was chosen "best Romanian novel of the twentieth century" in an early 2001 poll conducted among 102 Romanian literary critics by the literary magazine Observator Cultural, while its author endures as one of the most-studied Romanian fiction writers. The writer, his prose works, and the manner in which the reader relates to them were the themes for a 2003 book by Matei Călinescu, titled Mateiu I. Caragiale: recitiri ("Mateiu I. Caragiale: Re-readings"). Several other new monographs were dedicated to Caragiale, including a favorable review of his work authored by literary researcher Ion Iovan in 2002. Iovan is noted for defending Caragiale against the traditional topics of criticism. In contrast to his father Șerban, who was often a vocal critic of Mateiu Caragiale's literature and lifestyle choices, Barbu Cioculescu is likewise one of the writer's most noted promoters, and has occasionally been described as a mateist.

Reflecting on Mateiu's growing popularity, Matei Călinescu has argued that Craii... is to Romanian literature what El Aleph is in the eponymous Jorge Luis Borges story: a place containing all other conceivable places. In his 2008 synthesis, Istoria critică a literaturii române ("The Critical History of Romanian Literature"), Nicolae Manolescu revisits George Călinescu's pronouncements on interwar literature. Manolescu places Mateiu Caragiale, Max Blecher, Anton Holban and Ion Pillat, all of whom do not take the forefront in Călinescu's work, among their generation's "canonical writers". A diverging opinion was expressed by literary critic and Anglicist Mircea Mihăieș, who suggested that, despite the theoretical potential presented by Mateiu's lifestyle and background, Craii... is primarily a poorly written work, characterized by "a disconcerting naïvite", "kitsch" aesthetics and "embarrassing affectations". Mihăieș, who believes that Caragiale's only valuable writings are Pajere and his private correspondence, further suggests that Caragiale's various admirers, including exegetes such as Matei Călinescu, Vasile Lovinescu, Ovidiu Cotruș and Ion Negoițescu, are responsible for overvaluing their favorite author.

In 2001, Caragiale's collected writings, edited by Barbu Cioculescu, were republished in a single edition, while his copy of Octav-George Lecca's Familii boierești române, featuring his many comments and sketches, was the basis for a 2002 reprint. In addition to the volumes of recollections by "Grigri" Ghica and Ionel Gherea, Mateiu Caragiale is mentioned in Gheorghe Jurgea-Negrilești's book of memoirs, Troica amintirilor. Sub patru regi ("The Troika of Recollections. Under Four Kings"), published only after the Revolution. The work depicts notable episodes in his Bohemian life, including a scene where the overweight and inebriated Admiral Vessiolkin leaps over tables at Casa Capșa and recites English-language quotes from William Shakespeare to an audience comprising Caragiale and various by-standers. In 2007, Remember was issued as an audiobook, read by actor Marcel Iureș.

In the post-Revolution era, authors continued to take direct inspiration from Caragiale. In 2008, Ion Iovan published Ultimele însemnări ale lui Mateiu Caragiale ("Mateiu Caragiale's Final Records"), a mock-diary and speculative fiction work covering the final events in Caragiale's life. In addition to covering the elements of his biography, it invents a character by the name of Jean Mathieu, Caragiale's secret son. Caragiale's work was also treasured by Romanian-language writers in newly independent Moldova, formerly part of the Soviet Union. One of them, Anatol Moraru, wrote Craii de modă nouă ("A New Fashion of Rakes"), which is both a memoir and a tribute to Craii....

=== Visual tributes, filmography and landmarks ===
Published within the 1925 anthology compiled by Perpessicius and Pillat, Marcel Janco's modernist portraits of Caragiale and avant-garde writer Stephan Roll, were described by a number critics as Expressionist in style, based on their "energetic and spontaneous superposition of lines." One later reprint of Craii de Curtea-Veche was notably illustrated with drawings by graphic artist George Tomaziu.

An eponymous stage version of Craii..., directed by Alexandru Repan was performed by the Nottara Theater company, with stage design by Sică Rudescu. Dramatist Radu Macrinici also adapted fragments from the novel, alongside texts by Ion Luca and Ion Luca's uncle Iorgu Caragiale, into the play Un prieten de când lumea? ("A Friend as Old as Time?"). In 2009, actor-choreographer Răzvan Mazilu adapted Remember into an eponymous musical theater and contemporary ballet piece, set to the music of Richard Wagner. The original cast included Mazilu as Aubrey de Vere and Ion Rizea as Mr. M. (a character loosely based on Caragiale), with a set design and videos by Dionisis Christofilogiannis.

In the early 1970s, Mateiu Caragiale's life inspired a Romanian Television production produced and directed by Stere Gulea. In 1995, Craii... was turned into an eponymous cinema production, directed by Mircea Veroiu. It starred Mircea Albulescu, Marius Bodochi, and Gheorghe Dinică. The book and its author were also the subject of one episode in a documentary series produced by journalist and political scientist Stelian Tănase, dealing with the history of Bucharest; titled București, strict secret ("Bucharest, Top Secret"), it was aired by Realitatea TV in 2007.

Mateiu Caragiale's name was assigned to a street in Bucharest (and officially spelled Matei Caragiale in this context). Formerly known as Strada Constituției ("Constitution Street"), it is located in a low-income area on the outskirts of Drumul Taberei quarter.
