= Craii de Curtea-Veche =

1929 novel by Mateiu Caragiale

Rakes of the Old Court
- Author: Mateiu Caragiale
- Original title: Craii de Curtea-Veche
- Language: Romanian
- Publication date: 1929

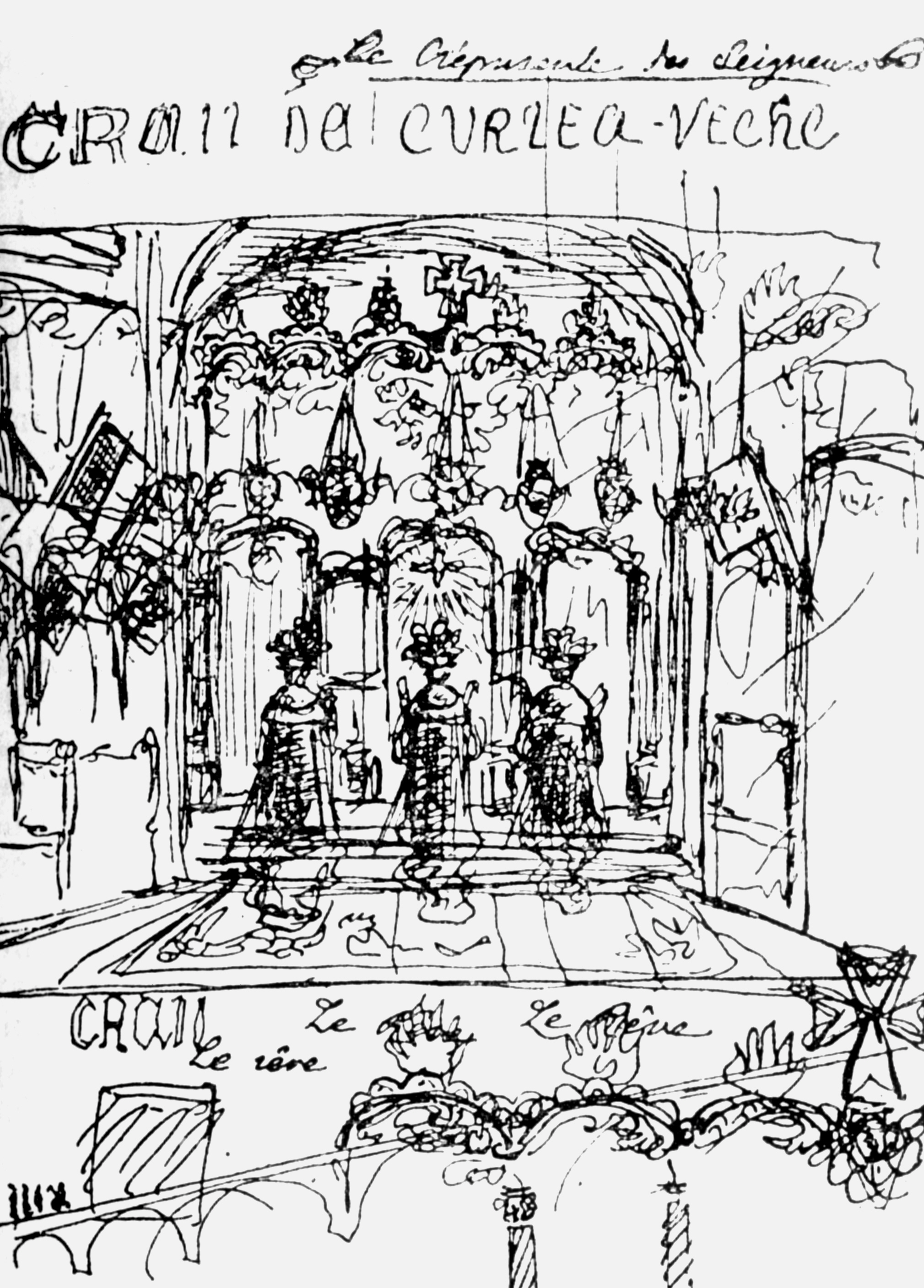
Mateiu Caragiale's illustration to Craii de Curtea-Veche

Craii de Curtea-Veche (known in English as Rakes of the Old Court or Gallants of the Old Court) is a novel by the inter-war Romanian author Mateiu Caragiale. Published in 1929, it took the author more than two decades to complete, and constituted his only major work. It has been translated into English by Sean Cotter as Rakes of the Old Court (2021) and by Cristian Baciu as Gallants of the Old Court (2011).

The short epic is not as much celebrated for its plot as much as it is for its style, blending a contemplative attitude inspired by Marcel Proust and fin de siècle decadence, inviting the reader into a decaying, "Levantine" 19th-century Bucharest, and prefigurating the intense debate among a whole generation of Romanian intellectuals about what Romanian specificity is (a controversy which was to culminate in Emil Cioran's philosophy).

== Plot summary ==
Written as a first-person narrative, Craii de Curtea-Veche depicts the lives of the rich and educated boyar family descendants Pașadia and Pantazi, who are often visited by the narrator. The latter admits his admiration for Pașadia and his fascination with Pantazi.

The two's mysterious existence is revealed only through conversations and banquet episodes, which tend to end in champagne-drinking bouts and orgies. They appear versed in Western manners and refined salon culture, but love to refresh their senses by submerging in the muddy atmosphere of Bucharest brothels.

Their destiny intersects with that of Gore Pîrgu, a brutish self-seeker who is on his way up on the social scale. A combination of venality, depravity and bombastic, often demagogic discourse, Pîrgu is meant to illustrate the alternative and undertoned "Balkan-like" Romanian identity. He manages to sell Ilinca, an impoverished young noblewoman, to the libertine Pașadia, but the latter is defied by Pantazi, who offers to marry Ilinca himself and thus save her family's honour. However, fate puts an end to such a romantic happy ending, as the young woman catches scarlet fever and dies, while Pașadia ends his adventurous life in a heart attack during one of his sexual escapades. The latter stage of the novel corresponds with the onset of World War I and the drastic changes it brought to Romanian society.

== Major themes ==
Mateiu Caragiale, natural son of the highly influential dramatist Ion Luca Caragiale, created his work in an intricate and original style. Craii.. is unique in Romanian literature through its ability to recall a rather fragile moment in history, and its distanced, discreet, and sober way of detailing a decaying social environment (and most of all its casual mixture of abjection and a high sense of morality).

The novel's motto, borrowed from Raymond Poincaré, resumes the essence of Caragiale's fresco: "What do you expect? We are here at the Gates of The Orient, where nothing is ever too severe".

A screen version of Craii de Curtea-Veche, directed by Mircea Veroiu, was released in 1995.
