= Ion Negoițescu =

Romanian writer and historian (1921–1993)

Ion Negoiţescu
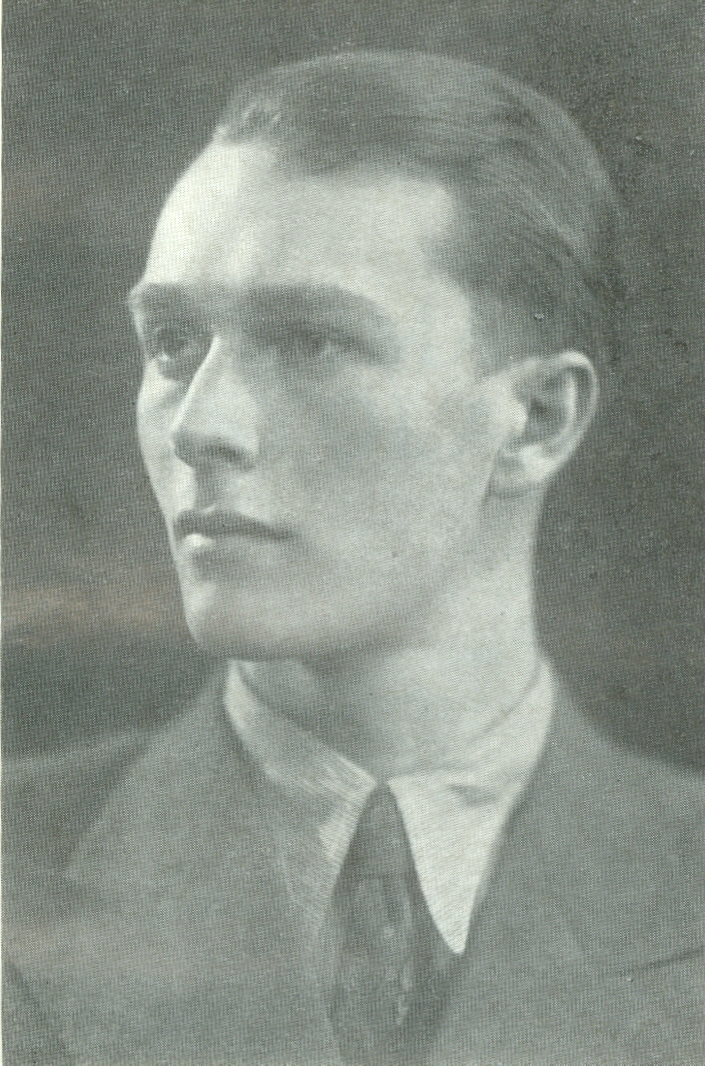
- Born: 10 August 1921; Cluj, Romania
- Died: 6 February 1993 (aged 71); Munich, Bavaria, Germany
- Occupations: critic, poet, novelist
- Writing career
- Pen name: Damian Silvestru
- Period: 1937–1993
- Genres: autofiction, essay, lyric poetry, memoir, prose poetry, satire
- Movements: Modernism, Sburătorul, Sibiu Literary Circle, Surrealism

Ion Negoițescu (Romanian pronunciation: [iˈon neɡo.iˈt͡sesku]; also known as Nego; 10 August 1921 – 6 February 1993) was a Romanian literary historian, critic, poet, novelist and memoirist, one of the leading members of the Sibiu Literary Circle. A rebellious and eccentric figure, Negoițescu began his career while still an adolescent, and made himself known as a literary ideologue of the 1940s generation. Moving from a youthful affiliation to the fascist Iron Guard, which he later came to regret, the author became a disciple of modernist doyen Eugen Lovinescu, and, by 1943, rallied the entire Sibiu Circle to the cause of anti-fascism. He was also one of the few openly homosexual intellectuals in Romania to have come out before the 1990s—an experience which, like his political commitments, is recorded in his controversial autobiographical writings.

After World War II, Negoițescu's anti-communism, dissident stance and sexual orientation made him an adversary of the Romanian communist regime. Marginalized and censored, he spent three years as a political prisoner. Ultimately reinstated during a late 1960s episode of liberalization, he continued to speak out against political restrictions, and came to be closely monitored by the Securitate secret police. In 1977, he joined Paul Goma and Ion Vianu in a civil society protest against the rule of Nicolae Ceaușescu, but was pressured into retracting. Eventually, Negoițescu defected to West Germany, where he became a contributor to Radio Free Europe and various other anti-communist outlets, as well as editor of literary magazines for the Romanian diaspora communities. He died in Munich.

Ion Negoițescu's review of Romanian literature and contributions to literary theory generally stood in contrast to the nationalist and national communist recourse to traditionalism or anti-Europeanism, and engaged it polemically by advocating the values of Western culture. His diverse work, although scattered and largely incomplete, drew critical praise for its original takes on various subjects, and primarily for its views on the posthumously published writings of national poet Mihai Eminescu. In tandem, the implications of Negoițescu's private life and the various aspects of his biography, such as his relationship to exposed Securitate informant Petru Romoşan and the revelations of his unpublished diary, have remained topics of controversy in the years after his death.

== Biography ==
=== Early life ===
Born in Cluj, Negoițescu was the son of Ioan, a career officer in the Romanian Land Forces, and his wife Lucreția née Cotuțiu. His maternal grandfather, a member of the Romanian Orthodox clergy in Transylvania, had taken part in the Memorandum movement under Austro-Hungarian rule. In contrast, Negoițescu's father came from outside Transylvania, being born to parents from the Romanian Old Kingdom. The future author studied at the Angelescu High School in his native city, and debuted in 1937, when he had lyric poetry fragments published in the local newspaper Naţiunea Română. At age sixteen, Negoițescu also published his first of several reviews in the student magazine Pâlcul, analyzing the Symbolist poetry of Mateiu Caragiale. It was as a high school student that he first met poet and thinker Lucian Blaga. Reputedly, Blaga saw his adolescent disciple as a genius and encouraged him to seek a career in literature. Negoițescu took his Baccalaureate in 1940, and subsequently enlisted at the Cluj University's Letters and Philosophy Department, where he studied under Blaga.

Having discovered his sexual inclination early in life, Negoițescu claimed to have had his first sexual experiences while still a young boy. According to his own testimony, he made his coming out at around age sixteen, when he wrote about his homosexuality in a test paper which he then handed to his supervising teacher. Reportedly, the paper was graded a ten out of ten, without further commentary from its recipient. Negoițescu later openly assumed his sexual identity and, in contrast to other gay men of 20th century Romania, did not deny it in front of the conservative cultural establishment (see LGBT rights in Romania). At the time however, the various ways in which the adolescent Negoițescu disregarded social conventions caused a rift between him and his parents, resulting in the first of his several suicide attempts. Negoițescu's subsequent life was marked by successive bouts of clinical depression and self-hatred.

=== Fascist episode and the Sibiu Literary Circle ===
As a high school student before and after the outbreak of World War II, Ion Negoițescu also became interested in politics, and rallied with the Iron Guard, a revolutionary fascist movement which would establish the National Legionary regime (in existence between 1940 and 1941). As he himself later recalled, he contributed to the group's press and, wearing the green-colored paramilitary uniform of the Guardists, took part in National Legionary street parades. This choice intrigued his biographers and reviewers of his work, who generally agree that it clashed with the young man's tolerant nature and individualism.

In autumn 1940, following the Second Vienna Award which granted Northern Transylvania to Hungary, Negoițescu followed the Cluj University's Romanian section as it relocated to the south of the new border, in Sibiu. As a contributor to the student magazine Curțile Dorului, he met and befriended poet Radu Stanca. It was also during that interval that he participated in the establishment of the Sibiu Literary Circle, with other young men who followed Blaga. His colleagues there included Stanca, Nicolae Balotă, Ștefan Augustin Doinaș, Cornel Regman and Eugen Todoran. They were joined by Victor Iancu, Ovidiu Cotruș, Ioanichie Olteanu, Ion Dezideriu Sîrbu, Deliu Petroiu, Eta Boeriu and Ovidiu Drimba. At the time, Negoițescu was also acquainted with linguist Ștefan Bezdechi and philosopher Petre Țuțea.

By that point in his life, Negoițescu made himself known as the ideologue of his generation, expanding his cultural horizon and familiarizing himself with the Classics, with German philosophy, and with the main works of Romanticism, while dedicating his efforts to promoting the work of isolated young authors such as Stanca and Mircea Streinul. He had slowly moved into the anti-fascist camp, objecting to both the Iron Guard and its partner-rival, the authoritarian general and newly appointed Conducător Ion Antonescu. In 1941, he published Povestea tristă a lui Ramon Ocg ("The Sad Story of Ramon Ocg"), a lengthy prose poem which he presented as a novel. That same year, in autumn, he traveled to the capital city of Bucharest, visiting modernist critic and theorist Eugen Lovinescu, the doyen of a literary circle known as Sburătorul. Negoițescu, who had just purchased himself the new critical synthesis newly published by Lovinescu's rival George Călinescu, commented on its strengths and weaknesses with his host. The meeting left an impression on Lovinescu, whose diary for that day reads: "I have the feeling he is 'different', he is an 'exceptional' young man, who is set to have a singular destiny."

=== Anti-fascism and Euphorion projects ===
On 13 March 1943, at a time when Romania had rallied with Nazi Germany and the Axis powers, he defied Antonescu's regime by affiliating the entire Circle with Lovinescu, himself marginalized for supporting liberal democracy and for rejecting the application of ideological censorship. Signed with the pseudonym Damian Silvestru and drafted by Negoițescu, the letter stating this position was published by novelist Liviu Rebreanu's magazine Viaţa. The Sibiu writers' statement ridiculed the officially encouraged traditionalist and nationalist literature, whose bucolic and anti-modernist themes it called păşunism (from păşune, "pasture"), while accusing its proponents of having replaced aesthetic appraisal with extreme dogmatism. These judgments scandalized the far right press, who successfully identified their actual source, calling on the Antonescu government to impose severe punishment: the fascist venue Ţara notably stated that the young men "should have patriotism inscribed with a whip on their sternums". Among the accusations launched by the fascist and antisemitic venues, Negoițescu found himself explicitly described as a "Bolshevik", "traitor" and "hireling of the Jews". In contrast with such reactions, Lovinescu found himself positively impressed by the group' gesture, and sent the Sibiu writers a letter which acknowledged them as his disciples. His sympathetic portrait of Negoițescu, published later in the year by Timpul newspaper, further publicized this special connection. The piece was nevertheless received with noted reserve by Negoițescu's own friends and colleagues, who did not necessarily share the two theorists' confidence in each other's ideologies.

In early 1945, some months after the King's Coup deposed Antonescu and aligned Romania with the Allies, Ion Negoițescu also became editor of the newly founded Revista Cercului Literar, a review published by, and named after, the Sibiu group. Alongside members of the Circle, the main contributors included the movement's mentor Blaga and various other established Romanian writers. Negoițescu's own works of that year included the study Viitorul literaturii române? ("The Future of Romanian Literature?"), in which he expressed a belief that urbanization and urban-themed modernist literature had rendered its traditionalist competitor, with its rural subjects, at the same time obsolete and objectionable. By 1945 however, the Sibiu group was breaking up, largely owing to the decline of cultural activity, as well as to the recovery of Northern Transylvania (since the young writers were able to consider returning to their respective homes).

In 1946, Negoițescu attempted to create a new venue for the Sibiu authors, named Euphorion and based in newly reincorporated Cluj, but had little success in obtaining support. According to Sîrbu, who was at the time detached as a commissioned sergeant in the Romanian Army, his colleagues had been attracted into cooperation with the increasingly powerful Romanian Communist Party, but only as a means to preserve their livelihood. Negoițescu had earlier published the second of his books, Despre mască şi mişcare ("On the Mask and the Movement"). In 1947, one year after his graduation, Romania's official publishing house, Editura Fundaţiilor Regale, granted him its Young Writers prize for the manuscript volume Poeţi români ("Romanian Poets"). With credentials signed by Blaga and French academic Henri Jacquier, and sponsored by the Romanian oil company Titan-Călan-Nădrag, Negoițescu was again in Bucharest, where he and Stanca both hoped to receive scholarships from the Institut de France. He was involved in cultural networking: in permanent correspondence with his former Sibiu colleagues, he also established contacts with novelist Dinu Nicodin, and befriended Lovinescu's daughter Monica (later a self-exiled critic and journalist).

In this context, Negoițescu was made a member of the board granting awards in the memory of Eugen Lovinescu (and named after the theorist), his influence helping in granting such distinctions to Doinaş and Stanca. However, the correspondence of this period also shows aggravated tensions between Circle members such as Doinaş and Sburătorul affiliates like Felix Aderca and Vladimir Streinu (who were both among the Lovinescu Award trustees). In June of the same year, somewhat intimidated by the experience, Negoițescu returned to his home region, where, in August, he received news that his paper of Paul Valéry's poetic style had been rejected by the Institut examiners.

=== Communist censorship and imprisonment ===
Negoițescu's career fluctuated after the 1947–1948 establishment of a local communist regime, when he became exposed to political persecution. Initially, he was employed as a librarian by the Romanian Academy's Cluj section (1950–1952). He was in tandem working on a critical analysis of Mihai Eminescu's work, Poezia lui Eminescu ("Eminescu's Poetry"), completed around 1953 but rejected by the new censorship apparatus. He had befriended the younger journalist and author Constantin Țoiu, who divided his time between writing for communist-aligned journals such as Gazeta Literară and frequenting marginalized figures; reportedly, it was a consequence of this ambivalence that Gazeta Literară editor Paul Georgescu effectively terminated Ţoiu's employment.

Despite his political dossier and the officially endorsed repression of homosexuality, Negoițescu had by then been made notorious for his successive amorous relationships with men from all walks of life, and rumors spread that he was also briefly involved with local celebrities. His heterosexual friend Nicolae Balotă also recalled running into Negoițescu at a 1955 party of "Uranians", where writer Mihai Rădulescu and classical pianist Alexandru Demetriad were in attendance, and where Balotă was allegedly the only straight man. Negoiţescu's cultural opposition also touched his friendships: in 1954, he played a part in rescuing Caietul albastru ("The Blue Notebook"), a samizdat work by Balotă, which the latter had discarded in Gara de Nord while pursued by agents of the Securitate secret police. In 1955, he was also present at the burial of writer Hortensia Papadat-Bengescu, who had been one of the leading Sburătorul figures before being marginalized by communism: in Negoițescu's own definition, she had been led to her grave "almost a pauper". Also then, just prior to being arrested, Sîrbu made an attempt to group his former university colleagues around his magazine Teatru. His publishing activity at times adapted itself to the exterior requirements of Romanian Socialist Realism and the communist ideology, such as in a 1957 article for Teatru, where he reviewed Papadat-Bengescu's play Batrînul ("The Old Man") exclusively as a progressive social critique of "bourgeois" society.

Beginning 1958, the clash between Negoițescu and the Socialist Realist cultural mainstream reached new proportions: the Communist Party-controlled media, including Scînteia daily, singled him out for having adopted "aestheticism". In this context, his adversary Paul Georgescu wrote about Negoiţescu's earlier "reactionary" stance, and claimed that the author was still failing to adopt "the judicious attitude". Similar condemnation was expressed by other Gazeta Literară contributors: Savin Bratu (who alleged that Negoițescu was one of those who circulated "names, works and ideas that we find foreign"); Mihai Gafița (who held Negoițescu and his colleague Alexandru Piru responsible for preserving "bourgeois ideology", while urging "the editorial staffs of literary reviews, the publishing houses [and] the Marxist critics" to react against this phenomenon); as well as Mihail Petroveanu (according to whom the trend represented by Negoiţescu signified "the penetration of modernist, apolitical or profoundly retrograde, traditionalist tendencies" coupled with "the infiltrations of liberal objectivism in union with precious, inaccessible language"). In particular, such voices condemned the critic's praise of banned authors, among them Lovinescu, Blaga, Mateiu Caragiale, Ion Barbu, and Titu Maiorescu. The same year, Negoițescu was excluded from the Writers' Union, and had his right of signature officially withdrawn (meaning that his name could no longer be seen in print). Eventually, in 1961, he became a political prisoner at Jilava penitentiary, and was eventually released through a 1964 amnesty.

Reportedly, the reasons for Negoițescu's sentencing were his participation in "hostile discussions" dealing with literary topics and his ambition of circulating an anthology of Romanian poetry that included banned authors. However, the actual arrest, concluding a major purge of the intellectual field, is also seen by some as a late ramification in the show trial targeting intellectuals Dinu Pillat and Constantin Noica. During his interrogation, Negoițescu made a point of not implicating his friend Țoiu, by claiming that the activities he had been indicted of were pursued despite Țoiu's better advice. As he later recalled, his body of published works was kept as evidence of his hostility to the official line, while a court decision led to the expropriation of his personal items (including his large collection of books, which was assigned to Editura pentru literatură publishers). Alerted by Doinaş, the critic's mother had destroyed all manuscripts he kept in his Cluj home, including his childhood diary (which reportedly opened with the words "I want to be a writer"). Negoițescu himself recalled that, while in penitentiary, he contemplated suicide for a second time: "I wanted to 'pull one' on my torturers and destroy the object of their sadistic pleasure". According to one account, he had tried to poison himself with meat he had allowed to fester, being unaware that boiled food could not breed deadly bacteria.

=== Liberalization years and return to literature ===
Following his release, Negoițescu was allowed to seek employment in his field, and, moving to Bucharest, became an editor for Luceafărul (1965–1967). It was at this stage that he met and befriended fellow critic Matei Călinescu, who later recounted how, as an employee of Gazeta Literară, he had attempted to find Negoițescu a full writing job. Negoițescu's new domicile, a basement room on Bucharest's Ana Ipătescu Boulevard, was a meeting spot for members of the Sibiu Circle and for young literary figures (Călinescu, Virgil Nemoianu, Toma Pavel). During the liberalization episode which coincided with the start of Nicolae Ceaușescu's communist rule, a relaxation of censorship signified that he was again allowed to publish, producing the volumes Scriitori moderni ("Modern Writers", 1966) and Poezia lui Eminescu (1967). After 1965, he and other Sibiu Circle members were reunited around two new venues: the Transylvanian-based magazine Familia and Secolul 20, a cultural periodical edited by Doinaș.

By then, Negoițescu was working on his synthesis of Romanian literary history. Its summary version was first published in 1968 by Familia, and instantly made its author the center of attention from several milieus. Having decided not to treat his subjects in the conventional Marxist-Leninist manner encouraged by the authorities, he stirred polemic passions on the literary scene and became a target for surveillance by the authorities. Negoițescu's text, which linked Romanian literary history with the development of urban culture, also intrigued the cultural establishment because it seemed to leave out completely all works produced before 1800. Also in 1968, Negoițescu moved on from Luceafărul to Viața Românească, where he was also granted an editorial staff office (a position he kept until 1971). That same year, he was allowed to travel beyond the Iron Curtain, but, as he himself recalled, the communist press at home had used the occasion to call him a "defector", "traitor" and "fascist". While in France, Negoițescu visited Monica Lovinescu, who was by then noted as a literary reviewer for the Romanian diaspora and anti-communist spokeswoman. Upon his return, Negoițescu admitted to Romanian officials that the object of this meeting was to reestablish the Eugen Lovinescu Award, which Monica Lovinescu had considered delegating to a panel of young critics living inside Romania (Matei Călinescu, Virgil Nemoianu, Nicolae Manolescu, Eugen Simion, Mihai Ungheanu and Ileana Vrancea); according to his account, the Communist Party structures prevented him from even suggesting this offer to the cultural official Paul Niculescu-Mizil. Later, when he wanted to revisit France and honor the personal invitation of writer Jacques Borel, the communist apparatus denied him a new passport. In early 1969, Negoițescu, newly readmitted into the Writers' Union, was assigned an apartment on Bucharest's Calea Victoriei. In December of the same year, the authorities threatened to confiscate the Negoițescu's citing a juridical rationale he viewed as untenable, and, as a result, he initiated a formal gesture of protest.

Despite the rising negative reactions against his work, Negoițescu continued to publish essays and monographs: Însemnări critice ("Critical Records", 1970), E. Lovinescu (1970), Lampa lui Aladin ("Aladdin's Lamp", 1971), Engrame ("Engrams", 1975), Analize şi sinteze ("Analyses and Syntheses", 1976). These books occasionally transgressed the limits imposed by communist leaders, and sparked several of his more or less severe clashes with censorship. In one incident of 1971, the entire circulation of Lampa lui Aladin was confiscated and destroyed by the regime's representatives. Such measures caused Negoițescu distress, and led him to attempt killing himself a third time, on August 23, 1974 (the 1944 Coup's 30th anniversary, and Romania's national holiday during communism). According to his friend, psychiatrist Ion Vianu, Negoițescu was hospitalized in the Bucharest Emergency Hospital for a long period, after having swallowed a large quantity of hypnotics. In parallel with these events in his life and career, he published several works of poetry: Sabasios (1968), Poemele lui Balduin de Tyaormin ("Poems by Baldwin of Tyaormin", 1969), Moartea unui contabil ("Death of an Accountant", 1972), Viața particulară ("Private Life", 1977).

=== Goma movement and defection ===
A seminal event in the writer's life and career occurred in 1977, when he openly rallied with dissident politics. That year, inspired by the Charter 77 movement in Communist Czechoslovakia, Romanian novelist Paul Goma drafted a collective petition critical of Ceaușescu's cultural and social policies in the post-July Theses era. While Goma was being subjected to an inquiry by the Securitate, Negoițescu signed an open letter displaying his solidarity with the initiative, and openly rallied with various other forms of protest. The document in question further antagonized the regime when it was broadcast by the diaspora section of Radio Free Europe, an anti-communist and West German-based corporation.

Himself arrested shortly afterward, Negoițescu was made subject to a humiliating and violent interrogation, at the end of which he again contemplated suicide. He was also threatened with prosecution on grounds of breaking Article 200, a penal code section which criminalized homosexual relationships. The Securitate men were by then interested in the homosexual relationship between Negoițescu and young poet Petru Romoșan, who was also taken into custody at the time, and whom various commentators of the incidents have since identified as the person secretly furnishing information on the critic's personal life. Several other men were detained as suspects, largely on charges of having had intercourse with Negoițescu. The group, which Romoșan himself argues included some 30 people, notably included poet Marian Dopcea, at the time a student at the University of Bucharest. The implications of Negoițescu's arrest also made him the target of interest in the Western world governments, representatives of which followed the case with concern. At the same time, the communist regime was forcefully expelling Goma and Ion Vianu, the latter of whom had joined the public protest by calling attention to the use of involuntary commitment as a political weapon.

As a means of avoiding this penalty, Negoițescu agreed to draft and sign Despre patriotism ("On Patriotism"), an essay retracting his statements and expressing regret for his action. According to writer Ștefan Agopian, Negoițescu himself was forced by the regime to accept a marriage of convenience, while Romoșan's punitive incarceration became notorious in the literary milieu. Still allowed to travel into Western Europe, he attended a 1979 poetry festival in Belgium, after which he became the recipient of several scholarships and invitations. He published two other Romanian books: his correspondence with Radu Stanca, as Un roman epistolar ("A Novel in Letters"), in 1978, and the collected essays volume Alte însemnări critice ("Some Other Critical Records") in 1980. However, Ion Negoițescu spent the early 1980s abroad, and, from 1982 to 1983, lived in Cologne, West Germany, and lectured in Romanian literature at the University of Münster. During his brief returns to Romania, he was a target for attacks in the national communist press, led at the time by writer Eugen Barbu and his Săptămîna magazine.

In 1983, Negoițescu decided to formalize his defection, settling in Munich. He became a contributor to Radio Free Europe, as well as to Deutsche Welle, BBC and several diaspora magazines. He was editor of two literary magazines, Caietul de Literatură and the Bad Ditzenbach-based Dialog, as well as Radio Free Europe programmer. Enlisting the collaboration of various exiled co-nationals, Dialog published Negoițescu's articles on authors in and outside Romania (among them Agopian, Bedros Horasangian, Mircea Nedelciu, Radu Petrescu and Dumitru Țepeneag). Together with other Romanian acquaintances who had been expelled from or fled Romania (Călinescu, Nemoianu, Raicu and Vianu among them), he was also a member of the editorial college for Agora, a United States-based magazine founded by poet and dissident Dorin Tudoran with support from the National Endowment for Democracy.

=== Final years and death ===
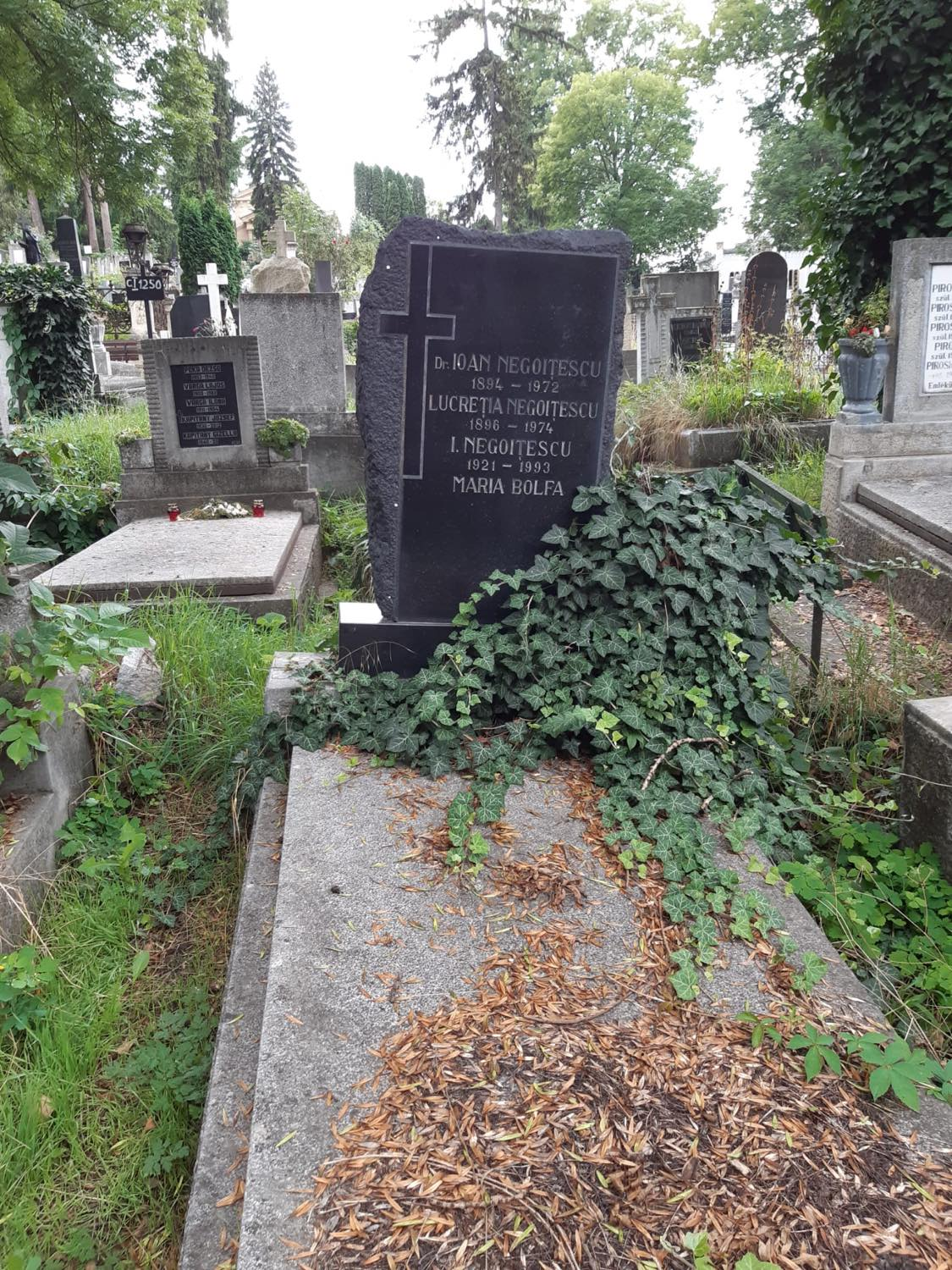
Memorial grave in the Cluj-Napoca Central Cemetery, containing his ashes

Recognition of Negoițescu's contribution in Romania was restored by the 1989 Revolution. As early as 1990, Editura Dacia published his În cunoștință de cauză ("With Full Knowledge"), grouping his anti-communist essays written abroad. The literary synthesis he had announced in 1968 was eventually published by Editura Minerva in 1991. Titled Istoria literaturii române ("The History of Romanian Literature"), it was still incomplete, and only covered the 1800–1945 period. Based in reunified Germany after 1989, Negoițescu was writing his volume of memoirs, which he believed would be regarded as his masterpiece, and on which he worked intensely. He maintained contact with the Romanian literary scene, and was notably interviewed by his younger colleague Marta Petreu. During one such encounter, he confessed his fear of dying before completing work on Straja dragonilor.

Hospitalized for a long interval, the Romanian writer died in Munich at age 71. His body was cremated, and his ashes taken back to Romania, where they buried at a cemetery in central Cluj. He had managed to complete only two chapters of his intended memoirs, published later by Petreu and Ion Vartic as Straja dragonilor ("Guarding the Dragons", Biblioteca Apostrof, 1994). Three other writings saw print in the period immediately after his death: the postscript to Istoria..., titled Scriitori contemporani ("Contemporary Writers"); the diary and memoir Ora oglinzilor ("The Hour of Mirrors", 1997); and his collected letters to critic Sami Damian, titled Dialoguri după tăcere ("Dialogues after Silence", 1998). His work as an anthologist, dating back to the 1950s, also saw print under Regman's direction: De la Dosoftei la Ștefan Aug. Doinaș ("From Dosoftei to Ștefan Aug[ustin] Doinaș", Editura Dacia, 1997).

== Literary contributions ==
=== Style and context ===
Owing to the political persecutions he was subject to for much of his life, Ion Negoițescu's literary career mostly resulted in scattered and incomplete works. Literary historian Alex. Ștefănescu compares the overall effect to "a room searched by the Securitate and left a mess." Noting the same defining characteristic of incompleteness, literary critic Bogdan Crețu mentions Negoițescu's inconsistency as an alternative cause: "he was a man of great projects which, as a rule, he did not manage to complete." Despite finding fault in this tendency, Crețu rates the author as "the most talented" among the Sibiu Circle critics, and "one of the most gifted critics we have ever had." The value of his contribution was linked by various commentators with Negoițescu's approach to literature and, in particular, his personal appreciation of beauty. Such distinctive traits were first discussed by Lovinescu in his 1943 article. Comparing Negoițescu to both Eminescu and Percy Bysshe Shelley, the Sburătorul theorist insisted on discussing his young disciple's appearance as an exterior sign of literary finesse: "A fine, feminine, androgynous; delicacy, shyness, quickly alarmed by some sort of bashfulness betrayed by discreet shades of carmine. And over all this appearance, a mask of reverie". Crețu sees Negoițescu's career as being consumed by "romantic gestures or enthusiastic drives, hardly tempered by the prodigious culture of this oversensitive, never matured, dandy." Referring to their collaboration in the Sibiu Circle during the late 1940s, Balotă however noted that Negoiţescu was an outspoken critic of those who valued beauty over message, being as such in line with the group's "ambiguous aestheticism". According to Alex. Ștefănescu, Negoițescu, a "solitary and misunderstood" figure, approached his mission more as an "accursed poet" than a researcher, and found in literature "a drug" to "inject in his veins". In Ștefănescu's view, this fundamental trait, like Negoițescu's homosexuality, was incompatible with both the "forceful brutishness" of communism and the "prude" nature of Romanian society.

Novelist and critic Norman Manea referred to "the exemplary nature of [Negoițescu's] case", as evidence that, contrary to popular opinion, the quality of one's literature "does not arrive from the ethic to the aesthetic, but the other way around." In his assessment, Negoițescu was "a minority member, not just an erotic one, but a chosen person, personifying the burning conditioning, truly intrinsic, [...] between freedom and beauty, not just between liberty and morality". Similarly, Matei Călinescu recalled being "fascinated" by "his vigorous 'decadent' aestheticism which was however paradoxically doubled by a major moral intransigence in matters of art and artistic truth". He believed Negoițescu's artistic vision to feature "a hidden moral edge", one occasionally turning back "on himself", and making Negoițescu "one of the major ethical figures in Romanian culture." A similar verdict was provided by Ion Vianu: "his proud demeanor, the rigorous aestheticism he professed were the expression of an extreme exigence, as expanded on the artistic level as it was on the moral one." Such aspects prompted Bogdan Crețu to suggest that Negoițescu's work was primarily characterized by a "critical consciousness", made possible by his "specific [and] tragic histrionism": "although it caused him great distress during his lifetime [...], it compelled him to become, no matter what the risks, consistent with himself; that is to say honest, enthusiastic, genuine."

As negative consequences of Negoițescu's aestheticism, Ștefănescu cites his "excess of solemnity" and the "excessive shyness" of his critical essays, as well as a lack of determination and a tendency toward "autosuggestion". Likewise, writer Andrei Terian saw Negoițescu as lacking a critic's "literary head", being instead an "avid consumer of art" with "an immense sensual appetite". In reference to the issue of critic versus artist, Ștefănescu argues: "He would provide contradictory verdicts. He would most often allow himself to be guided by the will to experience a moment of aesthetic beatitude. Whenever he lacked literary heroin, he would settle for a weak text [...]. He loved depths so much that he invented them." He and other commentators assess that Negoiţescu's self-avowed love for literature and books as objects was almost physical in nature.

=== Early works and Euphorion ideals ===
A substantial and precocious element of Negoițescu's critical work was constituted by his focus on Mateiu Caragiale. Bogdan Crețu, who notes the enthusiastic reception Negoițescu granted to Caragiale's poetic work in his very first published essay, believes there is an intrinsic connection between the two figures at the level of aestheticism. According to Ion Vianu, the "beautiful, pale and distant" Negoițescu brought to mind Aubrey de Vere, the "morbid aristocrat" in Caragiale's novella Remember. Negoițescu's lifelong appreciation of Caragiale's work, specifically his claim that Craii de Curtea-Veche novel was a masterpiece formed around a "secret architecture", was contested by literary critic and Anglicist Mircea Mihăieș. Mihăieș described Craii... a sample of "pretentious kitsch", and accused his various colleagues of having artificially increased Caragiale's cultural rating.

By 1945, Crețu argues, Negoițescu had reached his creative maturity, primarily by perfecting the "deconstruction" of texts making the object of his reviews. In particular, Crețu sees as outstanding the young critic's verdicts on George Călinescu's novel Enigma Otiliei (where Negoițescu had identified, probably ahead of all other commentators, a level of parody running underneath the formal borrowings from Honoré de Balzac) and on the poems of George Bacovia (compared by Negoițescu to the overall artistic standards of the local Symbolist circles, with which Bacovia had been formally affiliated). Written in parallel, Povestea tristă a lui Ramon Ocg, described by Ștefănescu as marking Negoițescu's brief affiliation with Surrealism, romanticizes the life of Mexican film star Ramón Novarro, with emphasis on Navarro's homosexuality. In Bogdan Crețu's definition, the book shows Negoițescu's commitment to anti-fascism, and especially his use of satire against "the fascist ideology, with all its abuses." Crețu also notes that the printing of Povestea tristă... was financed with money Negoițescu had made by selling his leather boots, part of a Guardist's paramilitary attire.

Euphorion, Negoițescu's failed project for a literary magazine, was also his stated attempt at producing a modernist literary manifesto. Placing his references in German Romanticism and Johann Wolfgang von Goethe's Faust, the critic found the tragic figure of Euphorion (in Faust: Part Two) as an ideal image of "all things new on a spiritual level". The core idea, occasionally paraphrased as Euphorionism, was defined by Negoițescu himself in terms of an Apollonian and Dionysian opposition, with a preference for the former term, and in combination with "modern Faustianism, that is to say dynamism, imprudent haste." Seeing in Euphorion a victim of preference for the chaotically modern elements of his own dual nature, and indicating that Goethe had initially intended to give his character a happier and more balanced existence, the theorist stated: "I shall propose as a goal that initial Euphorion [...]. All contemporary Romantic decadence, the signs of crisis and disaster, such as Naturalism and Surrealism etc., are consequences of that tear within Euphorion's being. We ought to propose the Goethian restoration."

Literary historian Ion Simuț, who theorizes a separation between the Circle's ideology and Negoițescu's own Euphorionism, also notes that, having earlier used Eugen Lovinescu to emancipate himself from Blaga and traditionalism, the young critic and all those who agreed, weary of seeming too detached from their roots, were invoking Goethe as "an antidote to Lovinescianism, that is to say against sheltering oneself in aesthetics." Simuţ writes that, unlike the Circle's ideological tenets, the newer program was "ambiguous, idealistic, likely to be approximated, not clearly defined of made concrete". Overall, Negoițescu's subsequent work of the time was divided between the influences of Lovinescu and George Călinescu: commenting on this verdict and paraphrasing a statement made by Ștefan Augustin Doinaș, Terian argued that the two mentors had become (respectively) "the cherished maestro" and "the hated maestro" to Negoițescu. Also according to Terian, this stance echoed Lovinescu's own ambiguous pronouncements about his rival Călinescu's work. Identifying Viitorul literaturii române? as a watershed moment, at which Negoițescu found himself disagreeing with both his mentors' core beliefs: on one hand, Călinescu's argument that Romanian literature rested on a peasant culture; on the other, Lovinescu's conclusion that Romania's cultural tendencies did not suggest any stylistic traits that were not also spread among similar civilizations.

=== Poezia lui Eminescu and Istoria literaturii române ===
Seen by Alex. Ștefănescu as both Negoițescu's only complete work and "a sort of critical poem", Poezia lui Eminescu became one of the most celebrated writings of its author's entire career. Literary historian and columnist Mircea Iorgulescu described the work as a "crucial moment in Eminescian exegesis", equaled only by George Călinescu's 1932 study Viaţa lui Mihai Eminescu ("The Life of Mihai Eminescu") and Ilina Gregori's 2002 Studii literare ("Literary Studies"). Iorgulescu argues that, although structured as "a meager pamphlet of a little more than two hundred pages", the book "radically changed the understanding of Eminescu and his poetry". Overall, the text neglected Eminescu's anthumous poetry and focused on poems only published after the subject's death. It discussed their somber sleep-related imagery, in particular the presence of androgynous angels, their recurring references to darkness, and their various allusions to the temptation of sin. These themes, commonly ignored by Negoițescu's critical predecessors, were argued to have revealed in Eminescu a "Plutonian" artist. Ştefănescu believes that Negoițescu had intended to elude that part of Eminescu's work that had become widely accessible to a "motley" public, and instead focused the remaining secrets. The result of such studies, Ştefănescu proposes, has "the flickering—and blinding—unity of magnesium flames", its intensity evoking "a maddening experience, leaving the experimenter to reemerge with his hair all white." In Ştefănescu's view, the passion felt by the exegete is the homoerotic equivalent of a physical affair. He writes: "Nobody, not even Veronica Micle, has loved [Eminescu] as intensely and as tragically as Ion Negoiţescu." This dissenting and highly personal view clashed with both critical orthodoxy and other contemporary reevaluations of Eminescu. Negoițescu's text clashed with the conclusions drawn by Matei Călinescu's in his 1964 book on Eminescu's late poetry (which had mainly focused on the relative impact of Schopenhauerian aesthetics). Negoițescu's concentration on Eminescu's posthumous pieces was intensely disputed in later years by literary historian Nicolae Manolescu, who regarded this approach as exclusivist.

Istoria literaturii române is seen by Ștefănescu as "not just unfinished, but also never started": Negoițescu had only published what was supposed to be its middle part (planning to discuss post-1800 literature in an addenda to a second volume, alongside 20th century works). Written earlier, Lampa lui Aladin was cited by the same critic as an example of Negoițescu's inconsistency and lack of structure, given that it dealt with "authors who are unlinked to each other": Doinaș, Dan Botta, Mircea Ciobanu, Florin Gabrea, Mircea Ivănescu, Marin Mincu, Virgil Nemoianu, Toma Pavel, Sebastian Reichmann, Sorin Titel, Daniel Turcea and Tudor Vasiliu. Ștefănescu added: "Ion Negoițescu had the negligence to promise that he would write a history of literature and then, up to the end of his life, felt himself harassed by the interrogative expectation of those around him, as if in the presence of hungry wolf mouths. He sought justifications for delaying work [...] and ultimately fashioned, out of scattered texts (some of exceptional value as essays), something that resembles a history of literature". Himself a literary historian, Paul Cernat deemed Negoiţescu's writing a "rough sketch", also noting that it follows the subjective and "impressionistic" tradition of mainstream Romanian literary criticism. This trend, Cernat believes, linked Negoițescu to the interwar authors of critical syntheses (George Călinescu and Eugen Lovinescu), as well as with his junior Manolescu. In this definition, the approach, which Cernat found debatable, rests on its partisans' belief that criticism "does not represent a 'science', but a form of creation in the vicinity of art, which does not reject rigor and erudition". Cernat contends that the application of an "impressionistic" approach in Negoițescu's 1967 book produced "extravagant" results. A similar point of view is held by Andrei Terian. He calls the work a "semi-failure", and, rejecting the notion that such problems were practical, arising from Negoițescu's lack of access to the primary sources, finds Istoria... as symptomatic for its author's inconsistencies. In support of this interpretation, Terian cites Negoițescu's decision to grant the lesser-known novelist Dinu Nicodin a prominent entry in the book.

One of the main purposes of Istoria literaturii române, as stated by Negoițescu's preface to his work, was to uncover the connections between the specificity of Romanian culture ("what we Romanians are and how we stand our ground when confronting history") and the wider European or Western context. The final version was also a statement against the tenets of national communism, asserting Negoițescu's belief that Romanian literature did not precede the birth of modern literature, and that it had developed as an "imitation of Western literature". Negoițescu therefore acknowledged that such a project could only be brought to its completion outside Romania, in a land touched by "the dawn of liberty".

Although incomplete, the book opened various new paths in critical commentary. It investigated the early history of Romania's erotic literature, and included a hypothesis that the erotic poems of Costache Conachi imitated Ode à Priape, a work by the Frenchman Alexis Piron. The postscript Scriitori contemporani was designed to complete his global analysis of Romanian literature, and gave ample coverage to the Romanian diaspora authors (although, critic Mihaela Albu notes, it failed to include authors from the regions of Bessarabia and Northern Bukovina). Elaborating on his assessment of "impressionist" criticism, Cernat insisted on Negoițescu's habit of structuring the chapters around only select parts of an author's contribution, the results of which, he believed, were uneven in scientific value.

=== Straja dragonilor and Ora oglinzilor ===
Negoițescu's main memoir, Straja dragonilor, has drawn attention for its frank depiction of precocious sexuality in general and homosexual experimentation in particular. Researcher Michaela Mudure argues that, by openly defining masculinity in non-heterosexual terms, the text is one of the "few and notable" exceptions within the "androcentric" literature of Eastern European cultures. According to Alex. Ştefănescu's assessment of the book: "It is for the first time that a Romanian author analyzes himself with a soberness taken to its last consequences, with even a sort of cruelty, producing confessions that others would not produce even under torture." A similar verdict is suggested by literary critic Adriana Stan: "The calm of extracting moral senses lacks [in Negoițescu], and his authenticist challenge to 'say it all' almost precipitates itself into an exhibitionism of a masochistic and anti-erotic nature."

This type of "insensitivity" is likened by Ștefănescu with that of "a cadaver on a dissection table", or "a statue that we can examine from all sides". The critic finds the work more daring than any possible analogy in local letters. He compares it to Miron Radu Paraschivescu's Jurnalul unui cobai ("The Diary of a Guinea Pig"), which is however "unforgiving" only with its author's acquaintances; to Livius Ciocârlie's diaries, which nevertheless "remain with the limits of literary decency"; to Mircea Cărtărescu's Travesti novel, which discusses transsexualism in metaphors that make it "less shocking." The same overall comparison was made by critic Ioana Pârvulescu, who found Straja dragonilor to evade the tradition of Romanian autobiographical literature, in that it was freed from "the obsession of the image", without courting the reader's sympathy. She adds: "Approaching death is a guarantee for a sincerity of the best quality. The only danger that stalks among the pages is that of time running out, and this provides [...] chaotic impatience and hastening, like the agglomeration of the last sand grains inside the neck of an hourglass." The episodes in Negoițescu's book portray the boy as a seeker of promiscuous sexual experiences, who enjoys the advances of grownup males (such as his father's orderly), but also experiments with girls his own age. In one narrative sequence, the author recounts how, finding himself inside a dark cinema, he satisfied his urges by fondling the genitalia of an unknown man sitting next to him, thus taking a gamble with public condemnation of a homosexual acts. Such experiences, Stan proposes, reveal the protagonist-narrator to have been "hedonistic", "Dionysian" and "histrionic", characterized by an unwillingness in taking critical distance from "the object of his contemplation", and displaying "a psychology of the excess".

Alex. Ștefănescu agrees with Negoițescu's own belief in the book's narrative qualities, arguing that Straja dragonilor is, after Poezia lui Eminescu, "the best of all that this feverish and uneven author has ever written". The same commentator commends the volume it for displaying a form of sincerity that was ultimately "conquered through culture and the experience of writing", resulting in "another level" of a memoir. He writes: "All is beautiful in Ion Negoițescu's autobiography, even that which is ugly. [...] A reader who is purely spurred on by a prosaic curiosity will find himself disappointed and will abandon it (like the sexually obsessed will abandon a book by Freud)." In Pârvulescu's view: "Although they break all sorts of taboos, [...] Negoițescu's memoirs are so well written that they never veer into vulgarity or obscenity." Likewise, Adriana Stan esteemed the book "singular in our literature" and its author's "capital work". Also according to Ștefănescu, readers who follow the account of young Negoițescu's spontaneous sexual act at the cinema will sympathize with the protagonist, and even "breathe a sigh of relief" to note that his advances were not rejected. The same reviewer finds another outstanding quality of the book in "the vast depiction of emotional states", which he believes comparable to sections of Marcel Proust's Remembrance of Things Past. In one such fragment, he argues, Negoițescu presents him child self as "a strange Pygmalion", helping his own mother get dressed for a ball and obsessing over every detail in her appearance. The "Proustian" nature is also highlighted by Stan, who argues: "the recollection performed by the grownup ego has therefore too little in common with a regular, constructed and directed writer's diary." Additionally, Pârvulescu sees an essential quality of the book in its depiction of Transylvania as both a prolongation of Austria-Hungary's "decadent greatness" and an area of Balkan and Levantine echoes, "the Ischler cookies on the same table as the qatayef." A section of Straja dragonilor is based strictly on an inventory of Negoițescu's genealogy, with insight into his family history. The segment is however deemed "boring" by Ștefănescu, who notes that the names mentioned "do not mean anything to us", but nevertheless acknowledges the "chill" they evoke: "the writer, alerted by the premonition of death, wishes to save [...] all things that he can remember about his forefathers."

Straja dragonilor also includes first-hand detail on Negoițescu's fascist episode, including the circumstances of his several contributions to the Iron Guardist press and the joy he experienced in late 1940, when the movement managed to assassinate historian and politician Nicolae Iorga. The interval is explained by the memoirist as being related to his identity crisis: "I was being driven by a terrible vital demon, an unprecedented impulse for affirmation, an acute individualism, maybe even an instinctual tendency for domination, all later curbed by my homosexuality, which imposed timidity on me, and eventually by the rigors of history". Despite this particular frankness, Bogdan Crețu suggests, the book effectively minimized Negoițescu's involvement with the fascist causes, by making them seem less relevant to his biography than they actually were.

Negoițescu's other late contribution to the memoir genre was Ora oglinzilor, which groups and rearranges fragments of a diary covering his life between the ages of 16 and 30, as well as autofictional pieces (as diaries of fictional characters named Paul and Damian) and intertextual homages to French modernist author André Gide. According to philologist Florin Rogojan, the full text "restores Negoițescu's image as a personality about to be born, reflecting him in his own subjectivity of a being who places all his stakes on creativity." In Rogojan's view, the key element in the volume is its author's confessed ability to "divide himself between the observer and the observed": "I have acquired something that all the people on this Earth ought to be envying. [...] I am at once the modeler and the sheer matter I am modeling." The book records the young author's own hierarchy of his personal projects, based on the manner in which they could impact on the outside world—from "my most important work so far", the diary, to planned (but never written) novels which were meant to celebrate his creative maturity. Rogojan views the introduction of fictionalized elements as a basis for stating the "cruel truths" about Negoițescu's life (the moral problems posed by his own homosexuality or the fear of losing artistic inspiration).

== Civil society activism and political thought ==
=== General characteristics ===
According to literary historian Mircea Martin, Ion Negoițescu and his Sibiu Circle colleagues represented a larger faction of intellectuals who, once empowered by 1960s liberalization and the prospect for resuming historical debates, voiced their support for Europeanism and cosmopolitanism. In Martin's definition, the diverse group includes others who "had passed through communist prisons" (Adrian Marino, Ovidiu Cotruș, Alexandru Paleologu), alongside the disillusioned or reformed Romanian Communist Party militants (Savin Bratu, Vera Călin, Paul Cornea, Ovid Crohmălniceanu, Paul Georgescu, Silvian Iosifescu) and a significant number of the younger writers who were only then making their debut. This community, he noted, was primarily reacting against the ethnic nationalist and protochronist ideologies promoted, within the limits defined by the communist regime, by such figures as Paul Anghel, Eugen Barbu, Edgar Papu, Mihai Ungheanu or Dan Zamfirescu.

Similarly, Norman Manea placed Negoițescu's public profile in relation with the aesthetic ideals of his work: "The indestructible attachment toward beauty and aesthetics has fortified the otherwise sober and frail being of the writer through times of Iron Guardist exultation, as well as through times of communist disarray and persecution. [...] The ugliness, barbarity, vulgarity and stupidity into which the great totalitarian setup quickly crumbles have proved themselves [...] rejected by Beauty." Matei Călinescu mentioned his older friend's "internally proud awareness of his own genius", as manifested against such definitions of genius as were being favored by "communist cultural parochialism". Contrasting Negoițescu's "aestheticism", "individualism" and "quasi-anarchism" with the "gray, stiff and fear-impregnated everyday of communism", Călinescu also noted: "Nego's daily heroism was that of being himself, no matter what the consequences of this social preservation of his identity and the refusal to hide it." Such views, Ion Vianu adds, transformed Negoițescu into "the perfect, exemplary victim of communism".

=== 1940s transition ===
Before becoming a disciple of Lovinescu, the adolescent Negoițescu viewed nationalism as a neutral quality, and even rated works he reviewed in accordance with their patriotic discourse. His articles of the time produced comparisons between the defunct Iron Guard founder Corneliu Zelea Codreanu and Christ, or state claims that the movement had symbolic roots in ancient history, with the Dacians and Thracians. After the National Legionary State was replaced with Ion Antonescu's regime, the critic expressed his support for the country's alliance with Nazi Germany, for Operation Barbarossa and war on the Eastern Front, describing the promise of a "great future". Manea stresses that, in later decades, the transformed Negoițescu was able to use his youthful affiliation to fascism ("the traps set by exultation") as insight into other forms of political experimentation: "The experience of gregarious jubilation [prepared] the easily charmed novice to accumulate mistrust of the multitude". This critical distance, Manea argues, also helped the grownup writer identify the perils of communist-era "exultation and stupidity", and in particular of "complicity with the bloated and filthy Power". The "emotional genesis of Negoițescu's ideas and thought" is also seen by Adriana Stan as a possible explanation for "the Iron Guardist episode", which she dismisses as "a conjectural accident of an adolescent too candid and cosmopolitan to nurture the symptoms of profound intolerance."

The Sibiu Circle's advocacy of Lovinescu's program attested the rejection of far right ideals. While acknowledging that the political context of the Second Vienna Award had made "national sentiment" more precious to Transylvanians than ever before, the text cautioned against a revival of nationalist exclusiveness in the literary field, and rested the fault for păşunism with the early 20th century Sămănătorul review. Negoițescu had designed a portion of the letter as a lampoon targeting "neo-Sămănătorists", whom he portrayed as demagogues camouflaged in modernist trappings: "Burning with the fever of exultation when they yell out the word 'culture' at each and any street corner, all the headmasters of patriotism, or morals and of poetry, in love with the 'holy soil' only because they view it from the comfortable armchairs of the city they still curse, the pășunists imagine themselves day and night at the plow horns". In a 1969 letter protesting against marginalization by communists, the author himself argued: "In what concerns the politically unfavorable atmosphere that has been created around my name, it seems curious to me that those who support it will not bear in mind that, in 1943, I was the author of the Sibiu Literary Circle's Manifesto, through which we protested against fascist ideology." He also insisted that his anti-fascist credentials were being recognized by several works of literary history published in the late 1960s. Commenting on the nature of his 1943 letter, Bogdan Creţu nevertheless rated it as an updated version of Lovinescu's lifelong principles, rather than a manifesto of artistic difference. Also according to Crețu, the young critic's affiliations meant that he was not "obtusely disregarding" traditionalist literature in its entirety, noting that Negoițescu was lenient when it came to poems by traditionalists such as George Coșbuc, Octavian Goga and Aron Cotruș.

At the end of his post-fascist transition, Negoițescu is even alleged to have rallied with Communist Party-led organizations. Discussing this rumor in his 1946 correspondence with Deliu Petroiu, Ion Dezideriu Sîrbu speculated about the possibility that his friends were merely seeking to survive in a new society facing communization: "A certain political indifferentism gives an absurd hue to all hopes for the best. The red dies are cast. [...] The boys have affiliated with the communists. That is to say Nego, Regman and Doinaș. They were promised a weekly magazine, funds etc. Nego even hopes for a visa and a passport to France." Sîrbu expressed a belief that the Sibiu Circle cell could form "an honest island in this chaos of asserted and legalized ignorance", and stated that, in case this was not possible, he would join them in planning an escape, through Arad County, to a Western Allied-controlled territory.

=== Opposition to communism ===
Commentators have often contrasted Negoițescu's public support for Paul Goma's movement and the risk this implied with the perceived lack of solidarity, intimidation or indifference displayed by the cultural establishment of the late 1970s. Discussing the context for the incident, British historian and political analyst Tom Gallagher assessed: "Privileges and carefully modulated intimidation encouraged intellectuals to stay quiet and sometimes even police their professions on behalf of the regime." A similar argument, presented by Dorin Tudoran, was paraphrased by Monica Lovinescu: the two authors singled out Negoițescu and Vianu as examples of "solidarity" among Romanian intellectuals, in contrast to the generic pattern of "solitude". The scarcity of such common initiatives, Monica Lovinescu concluded, clashed with the representative civil society projects of other Eastern Bloc countries (the Workers' Defense Committee among them).

According to critic and literary historian Gelu Ionescu (himself a member of the Radio Free Europe staff), Negoițescu, Goma and Vianu were the only figures of their day to question "the legitimacy of the system", a situation which he believed was rooted in "the character of Romanians", particularly their "fear". Himself an author and dissident, Virgil Tănase reflected back on the period: "Corrupted and sagged by a too lengthy and complacent convenience [...], Romanian writers viewed Paul Goma's effort with mistrust. A letter from Ion Negoițescu and the support of Nicolae Breban, that is desperately little..." While political scientist Vladimir Tismăneanu attributes to Goma and Negoițescu's "quixotic stances, all the more heroic since [they] could not count on solidarity or support from colleagues", the status of a singular reaction against the local prolongation of Stalinism, Matei Călinescu's account partly connects this issue with Negoițescu having "miscalculated the reaction of his friends" by believing his gesture would be reciprocated. In his Scriitori contemporani, Negoițescu himself compared the attitudes of local intellectuals with those in other communist countries, assessing that Romanians were weaker to react against their regime's demands, and arguing that, when faced with political pressures, Romanian institutions were "the first to yield".

Various commentators have also argued that Negoițescu's retraction was both the result of pressures and ultimately inconsequential. Gelu Ionescu thus notes that the text on patriotism was circumstantial and not, like some by his fellow writers, "a homage to Nicolae Ceaușescu." Călinescu also noted (emphasis in the original): "the bad things [Nego] caused by giving in reflected only on himself (he never signed any deal with the devil; he never, and in no way, implicated anyone else into anything) and [...] these bad things were not irreparable."

=== Other causes ===
A significant portion of Negoițescu's political writings provided a critical retrospective on interwar far right and its appeal among intellectuals of the Trăirist group of philosophers, academics and writers: Emil Cioran, Mircea Eliade, Nae Ionescu, Constantin Noica, Petre Țuțea, Mircea Vulcănescu and others. His Straja dragonilor included reflected on the attraction exercised by the Iron Guard and Codreanu on educated young men of the period, despite the fact that Codreanu's own political manifestos were at an "embarrassing level". He linked this phenomenon to the generation's reaction against rationalism and to its preference for charisma, explained by him as "a disease that was roaming the world at the time and one that could be better explained by theoretical means such as crowd psychology." In his interpretation, the measure to which these authors had chosen to emancipate themselves from fascism varied: Eliade, Noica and Țuțea "never cured", while Cioran, who assimilated a "nihilist" perspective, was an unclear case. He also believed that theologian and art critic Nicolae Steinhardt, whose career was related to that of the Trăirists, "carried the germ inside him when he proclaimed fanaticism as a virtue." Manea interpreted these assessments with caution, arguing that Negoițescu merged "names and situations that deserved nuancing", but noted that they satisfied the urgency of bringing the episodes in question up for public debate. Beyond these chronological limits, Negoițescu also proposed that Eminescu's own form of 19th century nationalism, and even the "angel of death" imagery of his posthumous poetry, may have been products of "the same affliction". His pioneering role in discussing the connection between Eminescu's theories and Romanian fascism was subsequently acknowledged by his fellow literary historians.

A special portion of Negoiţescu's essays deals with the meeting point between the currents of Romanian nationalism and the themes recovered by the Nicolae Ceaușescu regime. During his exile years, he was especially vocal in condemning Constantin Noica's late essays, which communist authorities tolerated for their critique of the Western world. To Noica's claim that Westerners had been pushed to "hate the world", forgetting their roots and heading for a collective disaster, he replied: "Is there now a place in the world that is more evidently heading for catastrophe than Romania is? [...] Where has the world been tarnished and where is it still tarnished more than in Noica's homeland? Where o where is European culture more degraded at this time than in the country where the very monuments of European significance and value are being more and more systematically torn down or mutilated in every way conceivable?" Deeming his adversary's statements "an offense to liberty itself", Negoițescu also placed Noica's isolationism and anti-Europeanism in connection with a common attitude in post-World War II Romania. According to this claim, the country had been abandoned by Europe: "like Noica, whose writings have no echo in the Occident, [Romanians] feel that they are shouting in the desert and curse the desert which does not hear and does not answer them." He believed to have identified the roots of this mentality in the political and cultural clashes of the Cold War, extending his earlier comments regarding the continental alignment of Romanian culture: "after 1947 our culture has been forcefully torn from its natural European context."

During the early 1990s, Negoițescu published several articles which examined the political developments in post-1989 Romania, focusing on the return to popularity of some far right themes. Marta Petreu paraphrased their content as "vocal appeals [warning] that we should not try to build a European Romania on the political ideas of Noica, Eliade, Cioran, Nae Ionescu, Eminescu and Vulcănescu". In tandem, Negoițescu was also rejecting the political stances of post-communist leftist forces, in particular the ruling National Salvation Front (FSN). In a letter cited by Manea, Negoițescu strongly rejected the claims publicized by FSN member and former Communist Party activist Silviu Brucan, who had publicly stated that, for lack of "democratic traditions", Romania could expect to undergo two decades of transition from communist institutions to a fully fledged liberal democracy. He found Brucan's assertion "insulting" for Romania's population as a whole, while noting that, between 1881 and 1938, the Kingdom of Romania had had democratic institutions, and comparing the overall context of the 1990s with Spain's three-year-long transition. At around the same time, Negoițescu also reacted against the tendency of some Romanians to reassess their national literature purely on the basis of its political status under communism, primarily noting that various works once considered valuable for their subtext had come to lose their importance, and called for a reevaluation.

== Legacy ==
=== Influence ===
Negoițescu's contribution left a mark on the cultural environment of post-1989 period. In a 2001 essay, Norman Manea argued that Negoițescu's condemnation of the Iron Guard's ideology, his criticism of post-1989 nationalist revival and his belonging to a sexual minority made him the target of threats and allegations. He concluded: "To what measure have his aesthetic, existential or political opinions, unavoidably interconnected, bothered and still bother not just part of the Romanian political establishment, but also the cultural one? What significance does the marginalization attempted immediately after 1989 (with its affiliated insults) [...] carry in the Motherland to which he remained painfully and lovingly chained? We do not know who would still have, presently, the patience of picking up on the bitterness of such questions." Petreu believes that "taking seriously" Negoițescu's anti-fascist messages, alongside Balotă's early demand for Romania to recognize the Antonescu regime's complicity in the Holocaust, could have engendered a reassessment of the past, thus preventing the resurgence of political and social problems.

Likewise, Negoițescu's cultural theses, volumes and presence continued to be interpreted by later literature. Ion Simuț thus sees Euphorionism manifested not just in Negoițescu's essays, but also in the drama writings of Radu Stanca and the "speculative and meditative" poems by Doinaş. Paul Cernat wrote that Nicolae Manolescu's own 2008 synthesis on Romanian literary history allocated much space to a debate with his deceased colleague over the classification of Eminescu's contributions. During the late years of the 20th century, poet Iustin Panta founded and edited the Sibiu-based magazine Euphorion, which owed partial inspiration to Negoițescu's project and had Doinaș as its honorary director.

Together with art critic Petru Comarnescu and writer-filmmaker Petre Sirin, Ion Negoițescu was listed in an annex to the Romanian edition of Paul Russell's The Gay 100: A Ranking of the Most Influential Gay Men and Lesbians, Past and Present (100 Cele mai influente personalități gay, Editura Paralela 45, 2004). The writer's articles and essays of the 1938–1947 period were reissued as a single volume in 2007, under the title De la "elanul juvenil" la "visatul Euphorion" ("From the 'Juvenile Impulse' to the 'Dreamed Euphorion'") and edited by critic Lelia Nicolescu. A second edition of Straja dragonilor saw print with Humanitas in 2009, being edited by Ion Vartic and prefaced by Ioana Pârvulescu. Apostrof magazine awards an annual Ion Negoițescu Prize to contributions by Romanian writers.

The writer's will specified that the totality of his diary could only be published in or after 2023. It was assigned by Negoițescu himself in the care of journalist Emil Hurezeanu, his Radio Free Europe colleague, who took the liberty of releasing a short fragment (covering the date of 4 January 1949). Pârvulescu, who calls the piece "an exceptional essay on love" and compares it to Plato's Phaedrus or Symposium, suggests that the undisclosed volume may prove to be "Ion Negoițescu's one great work." Much of his personal correspondence was bequeathed to Cornel Regman, and partly republished by his son, researcher Ștefăniță Regman.

=== Securitate archives and related controversy ===
In 2009, Cotidianul journalist Mirela Corlățan contributed an article in which the claim according to which Petru Romoșan had been a Securitate delator was asserted on the basis of archive material kept by the CNSAS government agency. One such document paraphrased Romoșan's alleged claim that Negoițescu needed to be punished for his "anti-social behavior", alongside personal statement recounting details from Negoițescu's private life. Also cited was a 1985 statement by Securitate colonel Victor Achim, responsible for reporting on the Writers' Union, who assessed that Romoșan was "our link on critic Ion Negoițescu", acknowledging the role played by such information in getting Negoițescu to "admit his guilt". Another note, issued after Romoşan's own departure for People's Republic of Hungary (and subsequent defection to the West), told of a plan to make him the target of a negative campaign by leaking information on his relationship with and betrayal of Negoițescu.

The scandal was enhanced when Cornel Nistorescu, the newly appointed editor in chief of Cotidianul, decided to postpone the publication of Corlățan's article and later to terminate her contract. Deeming his friend a victim "of the Romanian appetite for filth, rummages through one's private life and public executions", Nistorescu decided to temporarily remove the article from the newspaper's online archive, prompting accusations of censorship. As a result, several Cotidianul authors, including Ioan T. Morar, announced that they were ceasing their collaboration with the paper. Soon after these incidents, Corlățan publicized audio samples of threats she had allegedly received from Romoșan. Cornel Nistorescu himself explained that he had decided not to publish the piece because he considered it superficial. He also claimed that the paper had renounced Corlățan's services only after she had joined in public criticism of the paper.

Romoșan, who had earlier denied involvement with the Securitate, claimed that Negoițescu had actually both been recruited as an agent since their release from prison in the 1960s, and had spied for the Securitate's foreign bureau during his time in Germany. Speaking after Corlățan's article, he admitted having functioned as a Securitate informer, but not before 1987, when his wife, writer Adina Kenereș, was threatened with losing her travel privileges. He indicated that his signature on any other such documents was obtained with the use of violence and intimidation. He argued: "I presently think that I was being used by the Securitate, which destroyed my reputation in order to provide Negoițescu with a cover", and claims that Negoițescu himself apologized to him for "all the harm" during a chance meeting in the early 1990s. According to Nistorescu's assessment: "When the threads of Negoițescu's file will come loose, perhaps I'll understand something from [Romoşan's] adventure." In contrast, Morar and Ștefan Agopian both assessed that Romoșan's own flight abroad was part of a Securitate diversion. Literary critic Dan C. Mihăilescu gave Romoşan's claims the benefit of the doubt and urged for the Negoițescu file to be publicized in its entirety, but also asserted that Romoșan had lost his credibility.
