= D. Iacobescu =

Romanian poet (1893–1913)

D. (Dumitru) Iacobescu
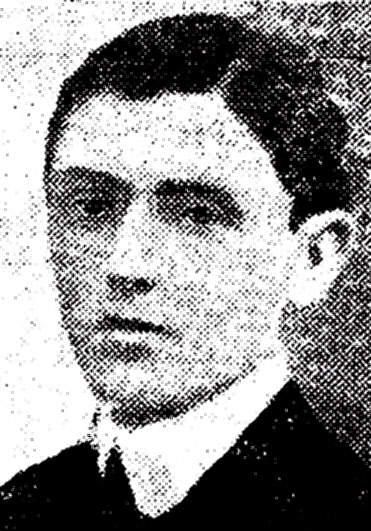
- Born: Armand Iacobsohn; 1893; Craiova, Romania
- Died: October 9, 1913 (aged 19–20); Bucharest, Romania
- Occupation: poet
- Writing career
- Period: ca. 1912–1913
- Genres: lyric poetry, ballad
- Literary movement: Symbolism, Decadent movement

D. Iacobescu or Dumitru Iacobescu (Romanian pronunciation: [duˈmitru jakoˈbesku]; born Armand Iacobsohn; 1893 – October 9, 1913) was a Romanian Symbolist poet. His literary activity only lasted about two years, between his high school graduation and his death from tuberculosis, but made him a critically acclaimed presence inside Romania's Symbolist movement. Much of Iacobescu's work remained unpublished during his lifetime, and survived as autographed notebooks. Once rediscovered and published some twenty years after his death, it brought him posthumous recognition as a writer of talent, but one whose introversion and nostalgia ran contrary to the main currents in modernism.

Romanticizing his own physical suffering while adopting stylistic elements from French Symbolist classics such as Paul Verlaine, D. Iacobescu left lyric poetry that is either resigned or visionary in dealing with mortality. His other contributions display an interest in Decadent, pre-modernist, themes, as well as a taste for black comedy. The contrast between his approach and that of other, more avant-garde, Romanian Symbolists did not prevent Iacobescu's affiliation with the modernist circle at Ion Minulescu's Insula magazine.

== Biography ==
Born in Craiova as the son of physician Iacobsohn and his wife Doroteea, the future D. Iacobescu belonged to the Jewish-Romanian community, being one of several Jewish members of his early modernist generation to make an impact on Romanian literature.

D. Iacobescu had a short life, marked by his losing battle with tuberculosis. He was however active on the literary scene of Bucharest, just shortly after completing his high school studies. In spring 1912, Iacobescu became an affiliate of the literary circle formed by Minulescu around the short-lived review Insula (the existence of which marked a coming of age in Romanian Symbolism). At the time, Iacobescu met the modernist poet Ion Vinea, who later contributed his obituary in Facla magazine. According to this text, Iacobescu, who rallied with "the purifying and insect repelling" Insula, represented a "multicolored ray, vibrating far away from [...] the mediocre talents." In addition to lending his contribution to Insula, Iacobescu had his various poems published by several other literary magazines or newspapers: Flacăra, Noua Revistă Română, Ramuri, Ilustrația Națională, Arta, Biruința and Noi Pagini Literare.

D. Iacobescu died in Bucharest at age nineteen. He left behind several calligraphed manuscripts of his lifelong poetry (most of it previously unpublished), including a notebook carrying the title Quasi. In a memoir written during or shortly after World War I, literary historian Tudor Vianu, who noted having "read and admired" Iacobescu while he was still alive, reviewed these unpublished pieces, and argued that their title probably alluded to an "indecisive atmosphere" to be discerned in Iacobescu's creative process. The notebooks included Iacobescu's first mention of being bedridden, with Zile de vară ("Summer Days", dated August 6, 1913), as well as his last known work in verse, Capriccio-Fantazie (August 13).

== Work ==
=== Generic traits ===
D. Iacobescu's short career, overlapping with Symbolist mutations into the avant-garde, was still characterized by a focus on the mainstays of Symbolist aesthetics. In his obituary piece, Ion Vinea described the "dreamer's verse" contributed by Iacobescu as complementing "the fastidious and strange plangency" of Minulescu's work. Writing in 1929, the modernist critic and poet Benjamin Fondane assessed that Minulescu himself was not a Symbolist, but rather one who adopted the label as "the pretext of revolt", and that Iacobescu, Ștefan Petică, and ("to a lesser degree") Vinea or Adrian Maniu were the actual voices of Romania's Symbolist school. In Tudor Vianu's opinion, Iacobescu was primarily a pre-modernist and "minor poet of great talent", whose work evidenced a stage in Romanian poetry that preceded the wartime effort. Himself a war veteran, Vianu noted: "This poet never once smiled. Wrapped up in his singularity, he was cultivating his nostalgia. This is how people wrote before the war. [...] Our souls demand basic touches and of the most generally human category. Had he been alive, Iacobescu, a less virile talent, could not have resisted."

A particular trait of Iacobescu's poetry, which placed him in line with the stylistic choices of many Romanian Symbolists, was its use of color-related epithets, particularly "synesthesic" ones (and, according to researcher Carmen Niculescu, with a personal palette of black, gray and blood red). Tudor Vianu argued that, in his more humorous works in particular, Iacobescu displays "the extraordinary precision of detail [Vianu's italics]", condensed into "dynamic evocations".

As noted by critics, Iacobescu's poetry was indebted to models in French or Francophone literature. A special influence on Iacobescu's style was France's Symbolist forerunner Paul Verlaine—according to literary historian Paul Cernat, the Romanian writer was a "Verlainian poet". The various echoes from "French poets active after 1885", as found in Iacobescu's style, were attributed by Vianu to three distinct sources: "through their unrealness and bizarreness some of them display, [Iacobescu's poems] border on Baudelaire's, and through their melodiousness and sweet sentimentality, place themselves beneath the autumnal skies of Verlaine and Samain."

The overall impact of such borrowings was assessed by literary historians George Călinescu and Tudor Vianu alike. While noting that Iacobescu found in French Symbolism "images suited to his own nostalgia, ships, ports, arctic seas, gulls, parks, fountains", Călinescu suggests that the parallel imagery of fêtes galantes is excessive: "Pierrots, Columbinas, lords, misses, minuets, gavottes, pianos, mandolins, guitars, pinkish, purple, gray salons, all in a too specifically French atmosphere, pushed to the point where it evokes the Bourbons". Expanding on his view about Iacobescu's poetry being essentially Decadent, Vianu exclaimed: "Bourbons! Lilies! Chinaware! Silk! Our soul—I'm being told by something that comes from deep within—demands different realities nowadays. Iacobescu took to his grave a something from his age."

=== Poems about disease and death ===
Călinescu believes the "personal note" of Iacobescu's literary contribution is to be found in lyric poems which deal with his sickness, with solitude and depression, detailing states such as "the strain of hearing to the vibrations of silence" or "the sensitivity in relation to rain". One such sample reads:

Mi-aduc aminte ca acuma
Cum noi stăteam ursuzi la geam
Ca două bufnițe pe-un ram
Și așteptam să treacă ploaia...

Translation:

I remember as if it were now
How we were sitting sullen by the window
Like two owls on some branch
And waited for the rain to pass...

Several such poems deal more or less explicitly with the symptoms of Iacobescu's disease. In one piece, titled Poem de amiază ("Noon Poem"), the author talks about his episodes of hemoptysis (or, according to Călinescu, "the obsession of hemorrhages"). It reads:

Nici eu nu știu ce am!...
Hemoragii de soare-mi bat în geam,
Cu lenevii de aur cald mă fură
Și mă sărută lung, pe ochi, pe gură...

Translation:

I too don't know what it is I have!...
Sunlit hemorrhages are knocking on my window,
Steal me away with idlenesses of warm gold
And kiss me long, on my eyes, on my mouth...

In the end, Călinescu notes, Iacobescu displayed the "fixation of death, which he sees as a descent into an aquatic environment". This is in reference to stanzas where Iacobescu talks about a spiritual vision or an apparition:

Și morții reci pe care noi îi credem că dorm
În adâncimi de fluvii, de mări și de oceane,
Și morții reci pe care noi îi credem că dorm
Trăiesc o nouă viață într-un ținut enorm
De plante și mărgeane.

Și viața lor e calmă, molatică și rece
Căci au în loc de inimi un vas de flori pustiu;
Se strâng mereu alături prin parcurile ude,
Și-nvăluiți de-un veșnic amurg trandafiriu
Vorbesc încet de lume, de prieteni și de rude.

Translation:

And the cold bodies that we think are sleeping
In the depths of rivers, of seas and of oceans,
And the cold bodies that we think are sleeping
Lead their new lives in an enormous land
Of plants and corals.

And their life is calm, soft and cool
For they have empty vases where their hearts once were;
They always gather together in the wet parks,
And, veiled by an eternal rosy sunset,
Speak softly of the world, of friends and family.

According to Vianu, Iacobescu's Quasi poems are in large part determined by the "premonition of death", showing his struggle with the notion and his coming to terms with it. In the end, the same critic argues, Iacobescu turned to "the illusion of historical fatality" in order to explain his condition. He finds proof of this in Iacobescu's lines:

O, adormi, adormi
În calmul nesfârșitelor pustii,
Troienit de valuri largi de soare,
De imense liniști arzătoare,
De nisipuri sterpe și latente
Și de-un șir de veacuri decadente.

Translation:

O, fall asleep, fall asleep
To the calmness of infinite wastelands,
Covered by vast waves of sunlight,
By immense and burning silences,
By barren and latent sands,
And by an endless string of decadent ages.

=== Black comedy ===
Iacobescu's sad and meditative poetry was contrasted by his other works, where he turns to depicting the irony of life, often highlighted by his use of grotesque imagery. Focusing on the Symbolist contribution to Romanian humor, literary historian Ștefan Cazimir argues that, among Iacobescu's writings, such samples echo either Verlaine (in cases where Iacobescu discusses his "hypothetical love affairs" in self-mocking tones) or Jules Laforgue (in those pieces where his texts veer into black comedy). Cazimir suggests that the latter influence is to be found in the poem Prin ceață ("Through the Fog"), where Iacobescu likens streetlights to ghosts that have no choice but to play audience to tomcats in heat.

In his 1918 note on Iacobescu, Vianu also assessed: "I do believe I have managed to capture an especially original tone in his poetry [...]. I mean a certain sentimental grotesque [Italics in the original] where laughter merges into a flinch of pain." This trait, Vianu notes, is especially observable in settings such as Scenă de seară ("Evening Scene"), where patients in a mental institution marvel as one of them plays the ballerina, and where contentment suddenly becomes violence:

Iar unul dintre dânșii plecându-se îi strânge
Un mic buchet de iarbă și de măceș uscat,
Cum, însă, dansatorul refuză încurcat,
Galantul se repede și-l bate pân' la sânge.

Translation:

And one of them leans down to pick for him
A tiny wisp of grass and dried-up eglantine,
But, since the dancer uneasily refuses,
The gentleman pummels him until blood gushes out.

== Legacy ==
The poet's notebooks were preserved by his friends, but, according to Vianu, they were unable to persuade publishers to issue them as a volume. Quasi was eventually published in 1930. After being reviewed by Vinea and Vianu, Iacobescu's work was revisited by critics of the interwar period, including Călinescu and the modernist critic Eugène Ionesco. The latter's articles, which center on the idea of radical cultural innovation, attacked the substance of Iacobescu's poems in terms deemed "full of hate" by cultural historian Marta Petreu. Being Jewish, Iacobescu was implicitly banned during the antisemitic regime of Ion Antonescu (1940–1944). In late 1941, when an anthology of Romanian poetry was supposed to be published in Italy, his name was crossed out by Alexandru Busuioceanu of the Romanian Propaganda Ministry.

In the 1970s, former Symbolist Barbu Solacolu was among those who suggested revisiting Iacobescu's work, calling him a "great poet". Iacobescu was again the object of critical interest only after 2008, when semiologist and critic Marin Mincu published the anthology Poezia română actuală ("Timely Romanian Poetry"). In what was equated with an actual recovery by literary reviewer Bogdan Crețu, it placed Iacobescu alongside other representatives of lyrical Romanian Symbolism. Mincu's work also placed Iacobescu's taste for the ballade poetic form in relation to the balladesque poetry of the 1940s, in particular with that produced by the modernist Sibiu Literary Circle.

In 2014, Ștefan Bolea republished Iacobescu's only volume, Quasi, along with literary references and personal commentary in a critical edition, praised by Oliviu Crâznic in Apostrof .
