= Virgil Nemoianu =

Romanian essayist and literary critic (1940–2025)

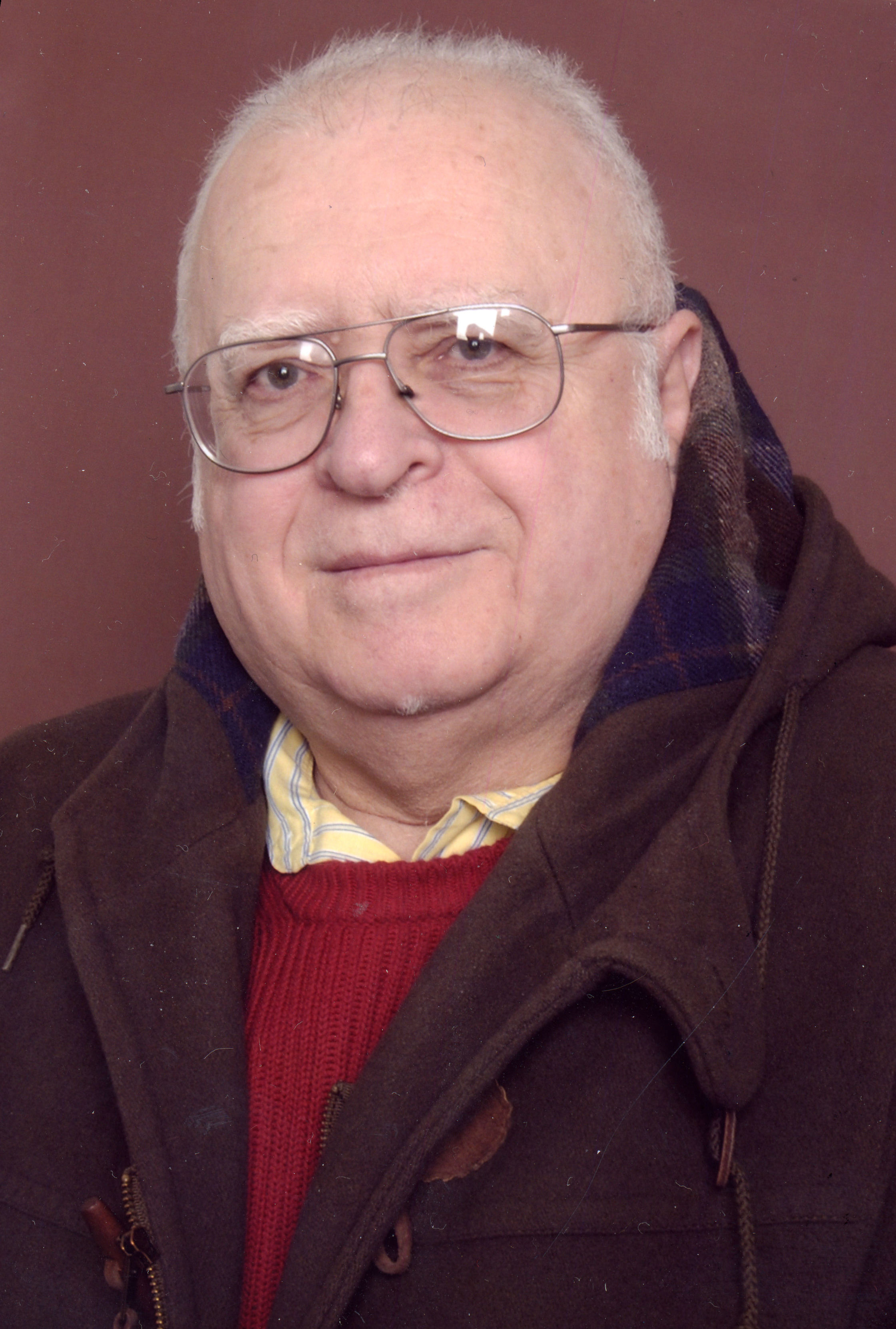
- Nemoianu in 2005
- Born: 12 March 1940; Bucharest, Romania
- Died: 6 June 2025 (aged 85)
- Education: University of Bucharest; University of California, San Diego
- Occupations: Essayist, literary critic, philosopher of culture
- Spouse: Anca Nemoianu
- Children: 1
- Writing career
- Notable works: The Taming of Romanticism; Theory of the Secondary; The Triumph of Imperfection; Imperfection and Defeat
- Notable awards: Order of the Star of Romania, Commander rank

Virgil Nemoianu (Romanian pronunciation: [virˈd͡ʒil nemoˈjanu], 12 March 1940 – 6 June 2025) was a Romanian-American essayist, literary critic and philosopher of culture. He was generally described as a specialist in comparative literature, but this is a somewhat limiting label, only partially covering the wider range of his activities and accomplishments. His thinking placed him at the intersection of neo-Platonism and neo-Kantianism, which he turned into an instrument meant to qualify, channel, and tame the asperities, as well as what he regarded as the impatient accelerations and even absurdities of modernity and post-modernity. He chose early on to write within the intellectual horizons outlined by Goethe and Leibniz, and continued to do so throughout his life.

== Early life and work ==
Nemoianu was born in Bucharest, Romania on 12 March 1940. His father was a lawyer. Of his two grandfathers one was a colonel in the military and conservative statesman, the other a medical doctor. The origin of both sides of the family was the Banat (a southwestern province of Romania), where Virgil Nemoianu spent his elementary school years and all summers until he was 20. These early years and the influence of his grandparents marked all his life with a deep commitment to Central Europe, its values, and its archaic and "idyllic" customs. In 1949 Nemoianu returned to Bucharest, graduated from the elite Titu Maiorescu High School in 1956 and obtained a college degree in English language and literature from the University of Bucharest in 1961. Many of his elder relatives (including his father) suffered longer or shorter periods of imprisonment at the hands of the Communist dictatorship. One uncle died in jail, another was executed.

Upon university graduation he was hired as a sub-editor at a Bucharest academic publishing house and subsequently at the weeklies Contemporanul and Lumea. In 1964 he joined the English Department of the University of Bucharest, first as an instructor, and soon after as an assistant professor. He visited Poland, Yugoslavia, Greece, Cyprus, and Austria. He gained permission to travel to the United States, defected and obtained a doctorate in Comparative Literature from the University of California, San Diego in 1971.

The publications of his early, "Romanian", years (c. 1961–1974) already indicate his ideological orientation. He drew from the traditions of Romanian thinking and criticism (Titu Maiorescu, Eugen Lovinescu, Tudor Vianu, and Lucian Blaga), and even more strongly from the aesthetic humanist doctrines of the Sibiu Literary Circle, as articulated by Ion Negoițescu, Ștefan Augustin Doinaș and others of the same group. These first publications dealt almost equally with Romanian, European, and comparative literature. Among them there was a book-length essay on structuralism (accompanied by an anthology), a selection of texts by Walter Pater, G. K. Chesterton, and T. S. Eliot, and two volumes of collected articles (1971 and 1973).

== Career in the West ==
Once he obtained his doctorate, Nemoianu taught at the Universities of Cambridge and London (1973–1974), UC Berkeley (1975–1978), Cincinnati (1978–1979), and The Catholic University of America in Washington, D.C. (1979–2016), as well as, in a visiting capacity, at the University of Amsterdam (spring 1995). At the Catholic University of America he was, successively, associate professor (1979–1985), ordinary professor (1985–1993), and William J. Byron Distinguished Professor of Literature and Ordinary Professor of Philosophy (since 1993). There, he also held the positions of Director of the Comparative Literature Program (1979–1994) and Associate Academic Vice-president for Graduate Studies (1989–1991).

In 1993 he was elected a member of the European Academy of Sciences and Arts (Academia Artia et Scientiarium Europae) and in 2003 he was granted the title of Doctor Honoris Causa of the Babeș-Bolyai University in Cluj-Napoca and in 2010 by the Alexandru Ioan Cuza University in Iași, and was invited by the Central European University in Budapest to offer the distinguished cycle of "René Wellek lectures" (2004).

Over the years, Nemoianu received numerous grants and fellowships from foundations such as Humboldt, Fulbright, DAAD, NEH, USIA, Taft, Earhart, University of California Regents' Fellowship, Wissenschaftskolleg zu Berlin and the University of Georgia Center. His awards included the Vatican Library Medal (1998), the "Harry Levin" Award of the American Comparative Literature Association (1986), the ARA Prize for Literature (1989), the Catholic University of America Excellence Award for Research (1987), the Award for Memoir-Writing of the Writers' Union of Romania (1995) and the Award for Life-Long Achievement of the Romanian Cultural Foundation (1997). Special issues of the Romanian monthlies Vatra (1999 and 2010), Familia (2001) and Revista 22 (March 2010) were devoted to Nemoianu's life and work. Articles about him have appeared in 8 encyclopedic works. The President of Romanian awarded Nemoianu the country's highest civilian award, the Order of the Star of Romania in the rank of Commander (2010).

Active in his profession, Nemoianu was a member of the Writers' Union of Romania, the International Comparative Literature Association (where he was secretary-general from 1994 to 2000 and vice-president from 2000 to 2005), the Association of Literary Scholars and Critics (where he was conference organizer in 2002 and member of the executive board from 2002 to 2005), the Goethe Society of North America, the American Society for Eighteenth-Century Studies, the Modern Language Association (where he was twice divisional executive committee member and president, in 1986–1991, for Comparative Romantic and 19th Century Studies and from 1994 to 1999 for European Literary Relations), the American Conference on Romanticism (where he was executive board member from 1997 to 2000), Committee Member of the American Council for Learned Societies (1991–1992) and others. He was contributing editor or board member on more than 20 scholarly or literary journals in North America, Europe, and Asia. He was a consultant, evaluator and/or referent for over 100 institutions, colleges, foundations, and scholarly or political centers (for many of these several times), doctoral director for 19 young scholars, and doctoral committee member for another two dozen. He participated in three dozen scholarly conferences, some of which he organized himself and in others of which he chaired sessions, in North America, Africa, Europe, Oceania, and Asia. Over the years he delivered approximately 75 invited public lectures, papers at scholarly conferences, and keynote addresses. Nemoianu wrote articles and/or co-ordinated sections for a number of encyclopedias, including, among others the Ungar Encyclopedia of 20th century Literature (1980, 1992, 2001), Encyclopædia Britannica (1976, 1977, 1978), The New Catholic Encyclopedia (1980s) Princeton Encyclopedia of Poetry and Poetics (1993), Encyclopedia of the Essay (1997). All together, he published – in several languages and in a variety of countries – a total of over 650 scholarly articles, reviews, columns, interviews and occasional pieces.

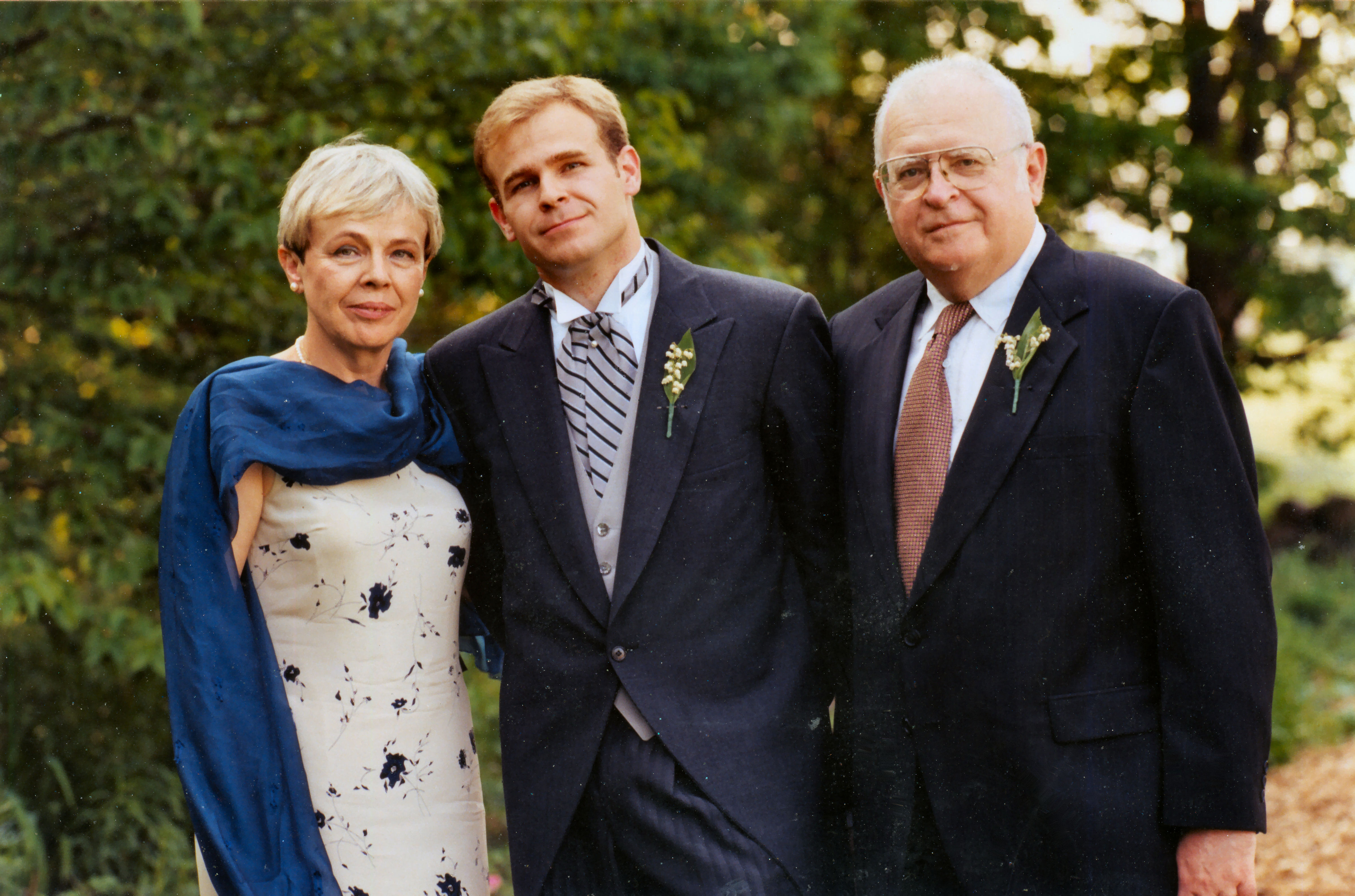
Virgil Nemoianu with wife and son (2001)

In May 2011, he was invested with the Royal Award "Nihil sine Deo". In November 2015, he was elected Honorary Member of the Romanian Academy. A 10-volume collection of his works is in the process of publication by Spandugino Publishers in Bucharest (beginning with 2014; 8 volumes have appeared. Volumes 7-8 received the "Best Book of the Year" award by the weekly România Literară).

== Main ideas and orientations ==
Nemoianu's chief fields of research interest and accomplishment were European Romanticism, the intellectual history of the 19th and 20th Centuries, and aesthetic theory. After 1971, he wrote first on the 18th century, and soon mostly on the early 19th century. He was also active as a collaborator to Radio Free Europe, the Voice of America and the Romanian Section of the BBC on Romanian issues, an activity continued in the 1990s through (mostly political) articles in the Romanian media.

There are four central concepts in Nemoianu's writings. The first is the autonomy and importance of the aesthetic in human existence. The beautiful is a key faculty of the human mind, no less than a basic attribute of reality; its perception is present from the beginning of humanization in all societies and civilizations, large and small, known to us. Nemoianu argued constantly, though in different contexts and using different examples, that without a sense and grasp of the beautiful, human life would be radically impoverished and perhaps its very survival might be endangered. (This can be seen most prominently in books published in 1989, 2006, and 2009.)

The second is that the best context for social and political activity and functioning is a moderate conservatism, based upon natural reason, common sense, free enterprise, and respect for tradition. (This view is most clearly expressed in volumes that came out in 1977, 1989, 1999, and 2001). His political philosophy drew heavily on Edmund Burke, Alexis de Tocqueville, and Michael Oakeshott.

The third was an emphasis on the powerful connection between the fields of the religious and the cultural (as illustrated primarily in books that came out in 1992 and in 1997). Throughout his career, Nemoianu tried to show the compatibility between the Roman Catholic and the Eastern Orthodox branches of Christianity. His intellectual guides in this regard were Hans Urs von Balthasar, Henri de Lubac and Romano Guardini, as well as a number of Orthodox theologians and thinkers.

The fourth is that the "Romantic age" (or simply the period 1770–1848) was a fundamental turning point in human history, the period in which durable images and thinking models were devised as a response to the consciousness of a globalization of human affairs and an acceleration of history; Nemoianu repeatedly used an examination of this age as an analogy to contemporary events (particularly in books published in 1984, 2004, and 2006). He also expanded the use of the period concept of "Biedermeier" for later Romanticism in Europe as a whole and emphasized its vast importance for later historical and cultural developments. The use of "Biedermeier" as a fundamental period instrument helped the author integrate East-Central with Western European culture. Nemoianu tried to merge his aesthetic, religious, philosophical and political view in a volume devoted to the contemporary age (2010).

== Further observations ==
Nemoianu wrote in both English and Romanian. His essays have been translated into German, Hungarian, Spanish, and Georgian, among other languages. A few of his works are somewhat literary in their structure, specifically a collection of aphorisms and fantastic descriptions (1968), a volume of memoirs (1994), and travel notes (2006). He also published (either alone or in collaboration) translations of both poetry and prose.

Nemoianu was married to Anca (née Țifescu) since 1969. Anca Nemoianu received a Ph.D. from the University of California, Berkeley in 1986 and teaches linguistics. They have one son, Virgil Martin Nemoianu, born 1974, who is now associate professor in the Philosophy Department of Loyola Marymount University in Los Angeles.

== Death ==
Virgil Nemoianu died on 6 June 2025, at the age of 85.

== Publications ==
=== Scholarly books in English ===
- Micro-Harmony. The Growth and Uses of the Idyllic Model in Literature (1977)
- The Taming of Romanticism. European Literature and the Age of Biedermeier (1984); Romanian transl. 1998, 2004.
- Theory of the Secondary. Literature, Progress and Reaction (1989); Romanian transl. 1997
- The Triumph of Imperfection. The Silver Age of Sociocultural Moderation in Early 19th Century Europe (2006)
- Imperfection and Defeat. The Function of Aesthetic Imagination in Human Society (2006)
- Postmodernism and Cultural Identities. Conflicts and Coexistence (2010)

=== Scholarly books (in English) edited or co-ordinated ===
- The Hospitable Canon. Essays on Literary Play, Scholarly Choice, and Popular Pressures (1991; with Robert Royal)
- Play, Literature, Religion. Essays in Cultural Intertextuality (1992; with Robert Royal)
- Non-Fictional Romantic Prose. Expanding Borders (2004; with Steven Sondrup)
- Two issues each of Stanford Literature Review (1980s) and RNL/CWR (1990s) – guest editor.

=== Books of literary, philosophical, and cultural criticism (in Romanian) ===
- Structuralism (Structuralismul), 1967
- The calm of values (Calmul valorilor), 1971
- The useful and the pleasant (Utilul și plăcutul), 1973
- The smile of abundance. Lyrical knowledge and ideological models in Ștefan Aug. Doinaș's work, 1994
- The games of divinity. Thought, Freedom and Religion at the millennium's end, 2000
- Romania and her liberalisms (România și liberalismele ei), 1999
- Tradition and Freedom (Tradiție și libertate), 2001
- Calm wisdom. Dialogues in Cyberspace with Robert Lazu (Înțelepciunea calmă. Dialoguri în cyberspace cu Robert Lazu), 2002
- Romania as Seen by Us. Conversations in Berlin with Sorin Antohi (România noastră. Convorbiri berlineze cu Sorin Antohi), 2008, 2009

=== Editing (Translations into Romanian) ===
- Literary Essays. Pater, Chesterton, Eliot (Eseuri literare. Pater, Chesterton, Eliot). (1966). Selection, introduction, translation, notes.
- Lyric portraits. Ion Pillat (Portrete lirice. Ion Pillat) (1969) Editing and introduction.
- Poems. Gottfried Benn (Poeme. Gottfried Benn) (1973) Introduction and translation (with Șt. A. Doinaș)
- Alibi and Other Poems. Șt. A. Doinaș (1973) Translation into English with Peter Jay
- The conversational essay from Bacon to Huxley (Eseul conversațional englez de la Bacon la Huxley) (1975) 2 vols. Selection and introduction
- The Eighth Day by Thornton Wilder (1976) Introduction and translation (with A. Nemoianu)
- Hyperion, The Death of Empedocles, Hymns and Odes by Friedrich Hölderlin (Hyperion. Moartea lui Empedocle. Imnuri și ode de Friedrich Holderlin) (1977). 2 vols. Translated into Romanian with Ștefan Augustin Doinaș and I. Negoițescu.
- Ion Dezideriu Sîrbu Crossing the curtain (I.D. Sîrbu. Traversarea cortinei) (1994) introduction and edition of literary correspondence (with M. Ghica)

=== Literary works in Romanian ===
- Symptoms (Simptome), 1969
- Interior Archipelago, Memorialistic Essays 1940-1975 (Arhipelag interior. Eseuri memorialistice 1940-1975), 1990
- As Stranger through Europe (Străin prin Europa), 2006

== Sources ==
- Nicolae Manolescu (2008). Istoria critică a literaturii române. Bucharest: Cartea Românească. pp. 1236–1239.
- Iulian Boldea, ed. (2010). Nemoianu – 70. Pitești: Paralela 45.
