= Sami Damian =

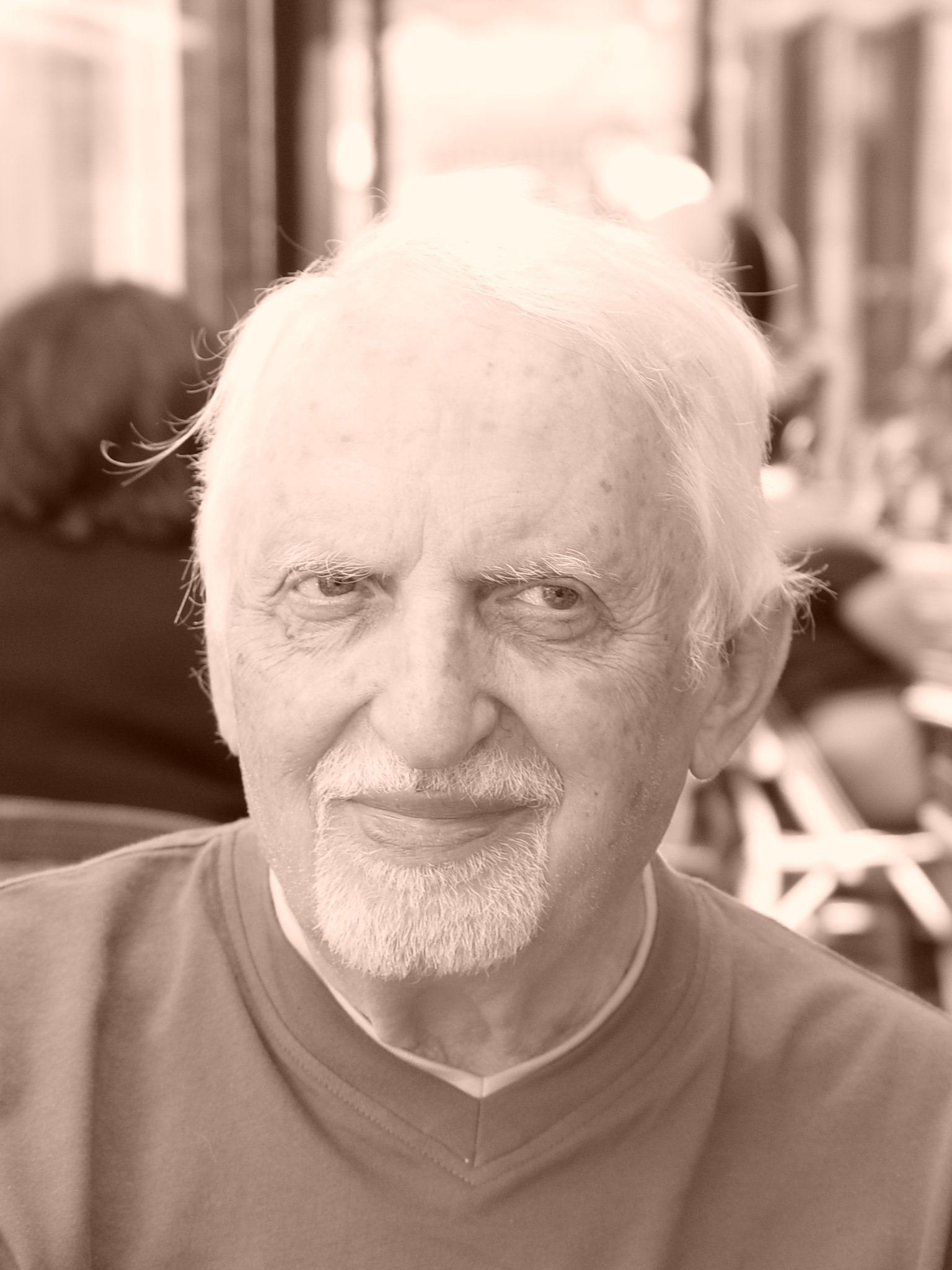
S. Damian (2006)

Sami Damian (sometimes referred to as S. Damian or Samy Damian (born Samuel Druckmann, 18 July 1930, Alba Iulia, Romania - 1 August 2012) was a Romanian-born Jewish literary critic and essayist.

== Biography ==
=== Studies ===
S. Damian studied at the Jewish "Cultura Max Aziel" middle school in Bucharest, then at the "Mihai Eminescu" Literature and Literary Criticism School in Bucharest (1950-1955), and at the Faculty of Letters of the University of Bucharest (diploma received in 1972).

=== Literary activity ===
S. Damian made his debut around 1955/1956 with literary criticism written in the spirit of that age's dogmatism.

He worked for a while as a copy editor for Contemporanul, Gazeta literară, România literară and Luceafărul.

Marginalised for a period of time, he was sent to West Germany in the mid-1970s to teach Romanian language and literature at the University of Heidelberg, after which he defected. He would continue to teach there until 1995.

After the Romanian Revolution of 1989, he published several books of literary criticism, essays, etc.

He married Simona Timaru-Druckmann in 1996.

In 1998 Ion Negoițescu's book Dialoguri după tăcere. Scrisori către S. Damian ("Dialogues after silence. Letters to S. Damian") was published.

He had a twin brother, Marcel.

== Books ==
- Generalitatea și individualitatea ideii operei literare (The Generality and Individuality of the Idea of Literary Work), 1955
- Încercări de analiză literară (Attempts at Literary Analysis), 1956
- Direcții și tendințe în proza nouă (Directions and Tendencies in the New Prose), 1963
- Intrarea în castel (Entering the Castle), București, 1970
- G. Călinescu romancier. Eseu despre măștile jocului (G. Calinescu, Novelist. An Essay on the Game Masks), 1971
- Scufița Roșie nu mai merge în pădure (Litte Red Riding Hood Does Not Go Into the Woods Anymore), 1994
- Fals tratat despre psihologia succesului (False Treatise on the Psychology of Success), 1972; ediția București, 1995
- Duelul invizibil (The Invisible Duel), 1996
- Replici din burta lupului (Replies From the Wolf's Belly), București, 1997
- Aruncând mănușa (Throwing the Gauntlet), București, 1999
- Pivnițe, mansarde, nu puține trepte (Basements, Attics, Not Few Stairs), 2002
- Aripile lui Icar (The Wings of Icarus), 2004
- Trepte în sus, trepte în jos (Stairs Up, Stairs Down), 2006
- Păr de aur, păr de cenușă (Hair of Gold, Hair of Ashes), 2007
- Nu toți copacii s-au înălțat la cer (Not All the Trees Have Grown to the Sky), 2010
- Zbor aproape de pământ (Flying Close to the Ground), 2008

== Awards ==
- Romanian Writers' Union Award, 1970
