= Dinu Nicodin =

Romanian writer (1886–1948)

Dinu Nicodin Nicolae Ioanid
- Born: 1886
- Died: 1948 (aged 61–62)
- Occupations: novelist, poet, businessman
- Writing career
- Period: 1910-1962
- Genres: historical novel, prose poem, satire, short story, travel literature
- Literary movement: modernism, Sburătorul

Dinu Nicodin (Romanian pronunciation: [ˈdinu nikoˈdin]; pen name of Nicolae Ioanid; 1886–1948) was a Romanian writer affiliated with the modernist venue Sburătorul. Having an aristocratic (boyar) background, he was an eccentric and adventurous figure who only turned to literature as a hobby, and whose scattered works were generally well received by critics during his lifetime. Nicodin was a promoter of works by his younger colleagues, and cultivated close friendships with those of his generation, being primarily noted for his presence on the interwar's social scene.

Nicodin's two novels, Lupii ("The Wolves") and Revoluţia ("The Revolution"), have earned praise for their erudition and their characteristic narrative style, but these traits have also made him hard to place in relation to 20th century currents in Romanian literature. The writer largely faded out of critical memory by 1950, although there has been a significant resurgence in interest in later decades.

== Biography ==
The scion of an old and prosperous boyar family, Nicodin lived in Bucharest, where his main residence was the Capşa Hotel. He was reportedly a passionate hunter, sharing this hobby with the other surviving members of Romanian boyardom. His other activities centered on eccentric and adventurous pursuits: a dueler and a horse rider, he was also a financial expert, and once tasked by the government with overseeing the liquidation of a bank. Although discovered late in life, his literary ambition is said to have led him to consider writing not just novels, but also screenplays and studies, in several languages.

Cultivating a personal relationship with literary theorist Eugen Lovinescu, Nicodin became a presence among the members of Lovinescu's literary circle, Sburătorul. The two shared a book collecting hobby and a love of fine paper: Nicodin procured for his friend paper items made from Japanese silk, and financed bibliophile editions of both their works. While attending the sessions of Sburătorul, Nicodin also pursued a romantic affair with female novelist Cella Serghi. His own debut came late in life: the 1934 novel Lupii, which elevated him to critical attention, and the prose poem Aghan.

Dinu Nicodin made his comeback to literature during World War II, when he published a volume of short stories, Pravoslavnica ocrotire (approx., "The Orthodox Protection"). Seeing print two years later, Revoluţia was Nicodin's contribution to the historical novel genre. His literary confirmation came later, after the August 1944 Coup toppled the repressive Ion Antonescu regime (see Romania during World War II). In September, Nicodin was one of the writers newly admitted into the Romanian Writers' Society, and whose arrival followed the expulsion of authors considered fascists or supporters of authoritarianism.

Shortly before his 1948 death, Nicodin was in correspondence with young critic Ion Negoiţescu. A disciple of Lovinescu and member of the Sibiu Literary Circle, Negoiţescu had earlier given an enthusiastic review to Revoluţia. Nicodin was among those who tried to obtain Negoiţescu a scholarship to study in France, but their common project ultimately failed.

== Work ==
Dinu Nicodin had an eccentric position in the field of Romanian literature, and has traditionally been described by literary critics and historians as a hard to classify figure, and found primarily interesting for using a distinctive stylistic category of the Romanian language. One such reviewer, George Călinescu, welcomed the novelist's 1934 debut as a display of "best quality humor, solid culture and an irony of rare acrimony." The same commentator later defined Nicodin as "bizarre" and "snobbish beyond all belief".

Later voices in criticism expanded on such verdicts, while issuing various interpretations of Nicodin's contextual role. Nicolae Manolescu notes that common perception has linked together Nicodin and another eccentric figure of his generation, Mateiu Caragiale, but suggests that this comparison is "entirely senseless", the only such similarity being a "precious and sumptuous style" present in both Lupii and works by Caragiale. Ovid Crohmălniceanu primarily identified Nicodin's literary contribution by its "arty prose", which he believed akin to the styles of Caragiale and Emanoil Bucuţa. He notes that, in Nicodin's case, the marks of this approach include: "carefully staged phrasing", "archaic patina", "affected and snobbish" manner and "rare pictorial strength".

Lupii, a combination of travel literature and satire, made an instant impression on the reading public. The narrative pretext is a hunting trip into the northern reaches of Transylvania region and into Maramureş, during which the protagonist, a forestry clerk named Venetici (from venetic, "stranger") is confronted with differences in customs and the hostility of locals. In his 1934 review of the novel, Călinescu suggested that the theme of the book partly deals with a cultural tension between, on one hand, the "asperities" of character encouraged by the Habsburg legacy in Transylvania and, on the other, the social characteristics introduced after the "Great Union". Crohmălniceanu finds that a defining element of Lupii is the inhospitality of local characters, which offers Nicodin grounds for "ironic reflections with erudite references".

In his definitive history of Romanian literature (first published in 1941), Călinescu nuanced his positive appraisal of Lupii. His note on the subject deemed "puzzling" other critics' reactions to Nicodin's work, including comparisons made between the author and the 19th century Romantic prose writer Alexandru Odobescu. In effect, he argued, Lupii was "an amateur's modest party, soon after forgotten."

The author's interest in bookish themes is again evidenced in Aghan, where he adapts a Romantic theme from French author Gérard de Nerval's La Main enchantée ("The Enchanted Hand"). A more ambitious project, Revoluţia was Dinu Nicodin's perspective on French Revolution and the philosophy of history. Writing from a Marxist perspective, Crohmălniceanu argued that the novelist was constructing "precipitous ramblings", the signs of "reactionary delirium". He nevertheless approved of "memorable scenes" such as the Noyades: "a somber painting, accomplished with extraordinary power of expression."

The volume was received with sympathy by some of the authors who were just then debuting. One of them, Pericle Martinescu, called it "a European-level creation" and Nicodin's "capital work", but argued that the particularities of style made it untranslatable. According to a 2008 article by academic Andrei Terian, Ion Negoiţescu's early review of Nicodin's book erred by shifting critical attention toward "saucy and picturesque" aspects, such as a glimpse into Jean Jacques Rousseau's sexuality. Negoiţescu also found "admirable" the pages which discuss the Great Fear, and expressed further praise for Nicodin's approach to the Reign of Terror (centered on graphic episodes such as one in which dogs drenched in human blood are chasing each other through the streets).

== Legacy ==
Present in Lovinescu's various autobiographical texts, Dinu Nicodin is also briefly mentioned in the memoirs of female novelist Lucia Demetrius, whose debut was also under the auspices of Lovinescu's circle. Demetrius, who describes the aged author as a "very elegant" man, also reports that Nicodin gave a good reception to her unpublished work, but also notes feeling "stunned" that Lovinescu, who mediated between his two associates, callously intervened in their correspondence. Nicodin is referred to in the autobiographical notations of another novelist, I. Peltz. He described his colleague as "well-built, with the calm gaze of men who have seen and are aware of many things", and recalled: "he dressed himself in accordance with the latest fashion in London, wore the most expensive perfumes of Paris, spoke with a studied foreign accent [and] carried out his correspondence on extra fine paper".

Dinu Nicodin was often ignored altogether in works of literary history published both before and after the establishment of Romania's communist regime. Among the works of his day who did mention Nicodin's work, George Călinescu's 1941 synthesis, according to a later pronouncement by literary critic Cosmin Ciotloş, effectively "dismissed [it], with superiority, in just a couple of phrases." An exception to this rule is Nicodin's younger friend, Negoiţescu: his own overview study of Romanian literature, published after his self-exile to West Germany, allocates more text to Nicodin's work than to the better-known works of Liviu Rebreanu.

The partial recovery of Nicodin's work which followed the 1989 Revolution and end of communism included a 2000 reprint of Revoluţia, published by Editura Albatros and edited by critic Ion Simuţ. In 2008, Nicodin was granted a sizable entry in Nicolae Manolescu's own overview of Romanian literature. According to Ciotloş, Manolescu parted with his mentor, George Călinescu, by reinstating Nicodin to a more prominent position. Manolescu's text was itself a comment on Nicodin's legacy: "Without doubt, the man is [...] superior to his work. Without the man's reputation, it is probable that the novels, not to mention the short stories [...], would now be forgotten."
