= Adriana Bittel =

Romanian literary critic and writer

- Born: May 31, 1946 (age 80); Bucharest, Romania
- Education: University of Bucharest

Adriana Bittel (May 31, 1946) is a Romanian literary critic and writer noted for her short stories.

She was born into a Jewish family in Bucharest, and is a 1970 graduate of the University of Bucharest's philology faculty.

== Memberships ==
In 1970, she was the proofreader and then the editor of the “România Literară” magazine, where she currently works. She is an editorial adviser at Universal Publishing House of Dalsi.

During her studies, she attended the "Junimea" cenacle of the University of Bucharest, led by critic George Ivaşcu.

She is a member of the Writers’ Union of Romania and of the Romanian PEN-Club.

In 2003, together with Ioana Pârvulescu, Marina Constantinescu, Nicolae Manolescu, Gabriel Dimisianu, Alex. Ştefănescu and Tudorel Urian, she took part in the jury that awarded the "Book of the Year" Award to the book "Journal 1990-1993" by Monica Lovinescu.

== Reviews of her work ==
- Simona Sora, Povestiri de azi, de mîine, Dilema Veche, Nr. 147 / 17-23 noiembrie 2006
- Tudorel Urian, Fustele lui Mitica, România literară, Nr. 47 / 24 noiembrie 2006
- Daniel Cristea-Enache, Cum ne trece viața, România literară, Nr. 4 / 2 februarie 2007
- Bianca Burța-Cernat, Cum ramâne în umbra o scriitoare, Observator cultural, Nr. 108 / 29 martie - 4 aprilie 2007
- Daniel Cristea-Enache, Recenzie de Daniel Cristea Enache, Pagină personală
