= Bittel =

Bittel is a surname. Notable people with the surname include:

- Adriana Bittel (born 1946), Romanian literary critic and writer
- Deolindo Bittel (1922–1997), Argentine politician
- Karl Bittel (1892–1969), German historian and journalist
- Kurt Bittel (1907–1991), German historian
