= Apostrof =

Magazine

Apostrof (Romanian for "Apostrophe") is a monthly literary magazine published in Cluj-Napoca, Romania under the Romanian Writers' Union patronage. It was founded in 1990 by Babeș-Bolyai University professor Marta Petreu, who is also its editor in chief and main columnist. Among its regular contributors are literary critics Irina Petraș, Ștefan Borbély, and Florin Manolescu.

Apostrof is especially noted for publishing dossiers on 20th century Transylvanian intellectuals, many of whom were subject to censorship by the communist authorities, and for detailing their contribution to Romanian literature. It also publishes regular book chronicles.

== History ==
The magazine was established in 1990, one year after the Romanian Revolution toppled communist rule. According to the Moldovan magazine Revista Sud-Est, it met with financial difficulties during several periods of its existence, and, in 2004, briefly closed down.

Apostrof has published dossiers on prominent literary figures who are associated with Transylvania and whose work, in many cases, was not accessible to the public under communism. These include poet and philosopher Lucian Blaga, literary critics Mircea Zaciu, Ion Negoițescu, and Nicolae Balotă, and dramatist Ion Dezideriu Sîrbu. According to Revista Sud-Est: "Natives of this area, [the dossiers' subjects] are also resounding names that have coverage throughout Romanian literature."

In June 2005, it was also involved in a public awareness campaign over construction work carried out in Lancrăm, which threatened to harm a historical site and, it argued, went against Lucian Blaga's last wish (by disrupting the access from Blaga's grave to the Red Ravines area).

== See also ==
- List of magazines in Romania
