= Sorin Lavric =

Romanian writer, philosopher and politician

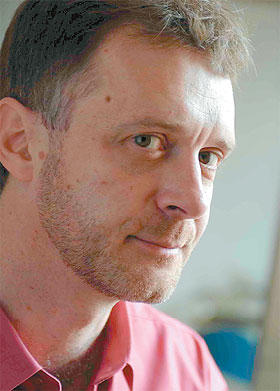
- Lavric in 2008

Member of the Senate of Romania
- Incumbent
- Assumed office 21 December 2020

Personal details
- Born: 27 November 1967 (age 58) Turnu Severin, Oltenia Region, Romania
- Party: Alliance for the Union of Romanians (AUR)
- Education: Carol Davila University of Medicine and Pharmacy; University of Bucharest
- Occupation: Writer, philosopher, politician

Sorin Lavric (born 27 November 1967) is a Romanian writer, philosopher and politician. Having started studying medicine in 1987, Lavric later began studying philosophy as well. Subsequently, as he did not want to be a physician, he focused entirely on philosophy. Lavric finished his university studies in 1996 and obtained a doctorate in philosophy in 2005. Lavric has written several books.

He has made in the past numerous comments that have been deemed as racist, homophobic and misogynistic that have provoked his expulsion from the Writers' Union of Romania. Despite this, he has affirmed that he is not a misogynist. Lavric eventually became a politician "to confront the corruption and political class of Romania". He joined the Alliance for the Union of Romanians (AUR), of which he is the President of the Senate. Lavric was also the proposed senator of the AUR for the Neamț County.

== Biography ==
Sorin Lavric was born in 1967 in Turnu Severin, Socialist Republic of Romania. He studied medicine at the Carol Davila University of Medicine and Pharmacy between 1987 and 1993. Afterwards, he did an internship at the Brăila County Hospital, which included 3 months of gynecology. In 1990, he enrolled at the Faculty of Philosophy of the University of Bucharest, having had to repeat one year because of his internship and graduating in 1996. According to him, he only studied medicine because at that time (1987), during the communist period of Romania, it was not worth studying philosophy.

After his internship, Lavric realized he disliked medicine and had to choose between becoming a physician and not being able to aspire to be a philosopher or giving up medicine. Lavric chose the latter option and had to be supported by his wife for 2 years. After completing his studies in 1996, he was offered in 1997 a job as an editor at the publishing house Humanitas by the Romanian philosopher Gabriel Liiceanu. In 2005, he obtained a doctorate in philosophy from the University of Bucharest. Liiceanu, who was coordinator in Lavric's thesis for the doctorate, has expressed surprise at his posterior controversial comments, saying that it is as if Lavric had undergone "a personality substitution operation", "as in science fiction movies".

Lavric has written several books, such as Cartea de Crăciun ("Christmas Book", 1997), Ontologia lui Noica. O exegeză ("Noica's ontology. An exegesis", 2005) and Noica și Mișcarea Legionară ("Noica and the Legionary Movement", 2007). He has also done several translations.

== Ideology and political career ==
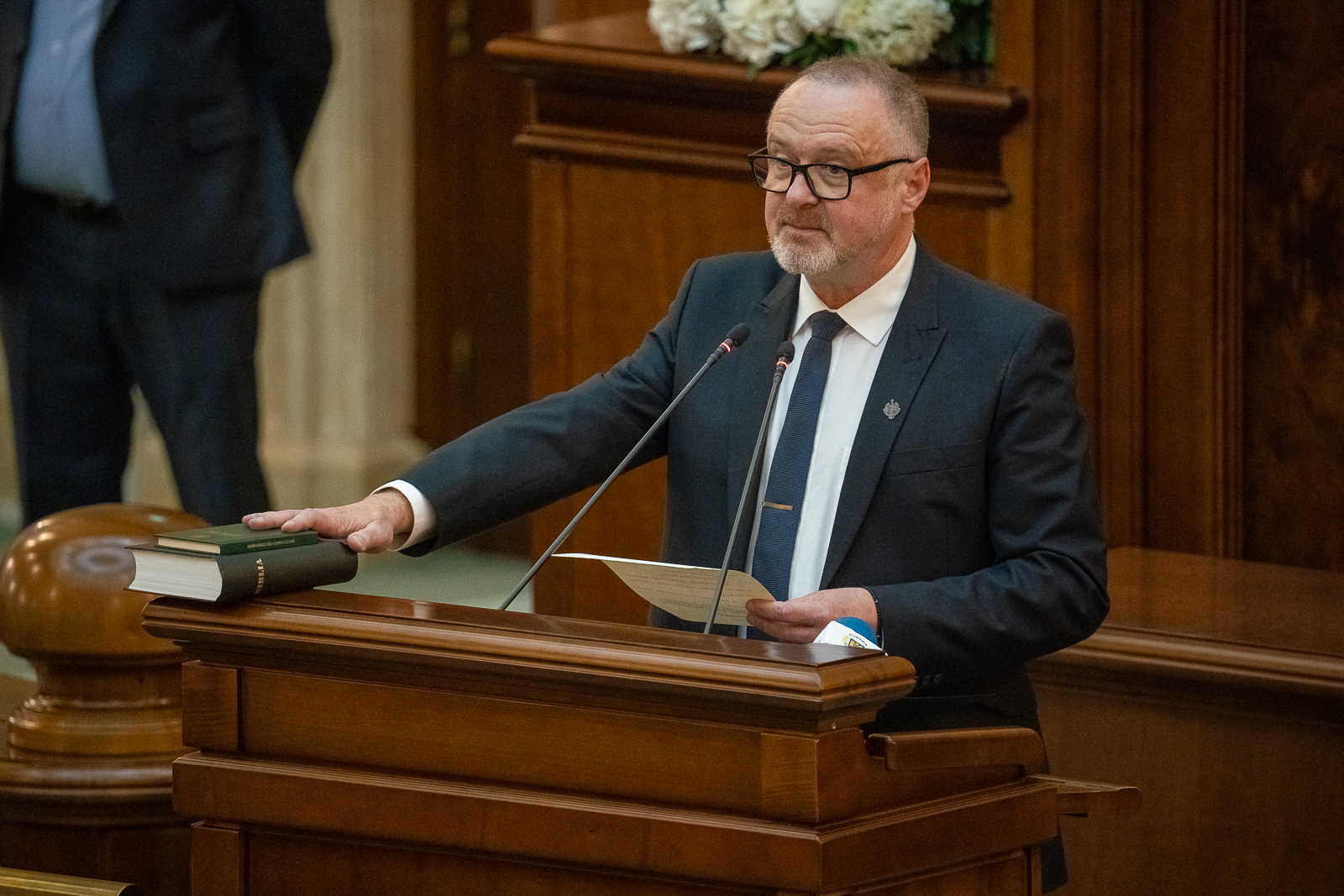
Lavric taking the oath of office at the Romanian Senate on 21 December 2024

Lavric has made several comments characterized as racist, homophobic and misogynistic; these have given him a certain notoriety in the past. In his book Decoct de femeie ("Decoction of women"), he wrote that "no man seeks in women cleverness, depth, or lucidity". He has also described the Roma people (Gypsies) as a "social plague". In an interview, Lavric denied being a misogynist and explained his thoughts and declarations, stating that "I cannot say that a woman excels in logical thinking, especially in philosophical skills". Furthermore, Lavric has admitted being a misanthrope.

Because of his comments, the Writers' Union of Romania expelled him from the association and from the position of editor in the magazine România literară. In the same interview, which was posterior to this event, Lavric said he was surprised when he heard about this as it was not directly communicated to him and that he felt "hit" by his own teammates. He added that he did not feel resentful for this.

Lavric joined the Alliance for the Union of Romanians (AUR) because, according to him, he was against the corrupt attitudes of the political class and because he coincided with the thoughts of George Simion and Claudiu Târziu, then the co-presidents of the AUR. He also stated that he was pro-European and supported NATO, but opposed a European "federal superstate run [...] from Brussels". In an interview with Simion and Târziu, they said that Lavric (and the AUR) did not hate women or support misogynistic ideas. Lavric was the proposed senator of the AUR for the Neamț County in 2020. Currently, he is the President of the Senate of the AUR.
