= Ioana Pârvulescu =

Romanian writer

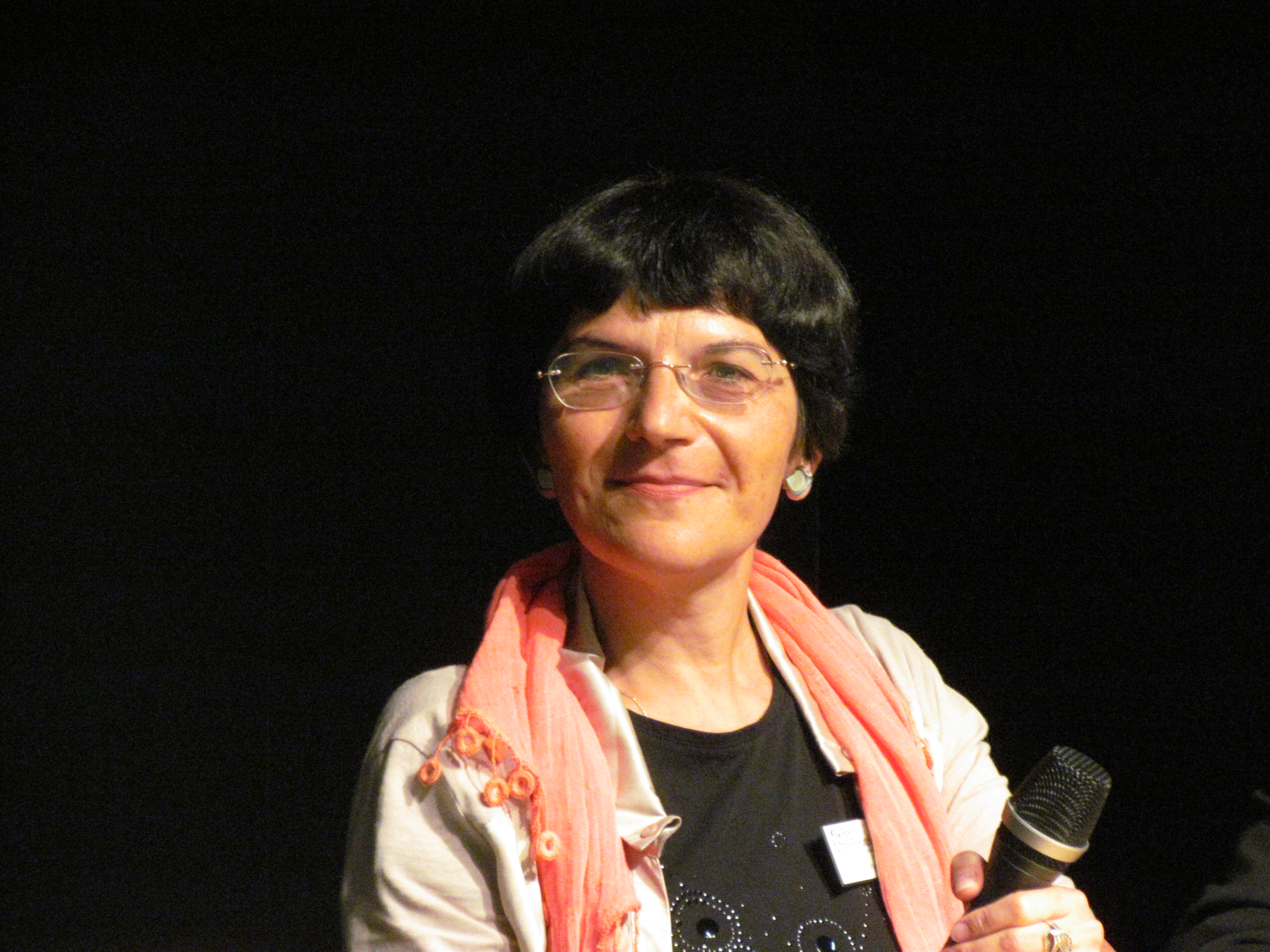
- Born: Brașov, Romania
- Citizenship: Romanian
- Education: University of Bucharest
- Occupation: Novelist
- Writing career
- Language: Romanian, English, German, French
- Notable work: Life Begins on Friday
- Notable awards: European Union Prize for Literature, 2013

Ioana Pârvulescu (born 1960) is a Romanian writer. She was born in Brașov and studied at the University of Bucharest. She graduated in 1983, and went on to complete a PhD in literature in 1999. She teaches modern literature at the same university.

She has worked at the literary journal România literară, and has translated the works of Maurice Nadeau, Angelus Silesius and Rainer Maria Rilke. She is a member of the Romanian Writers' Union. In 2013, Pârvulescu won the EU Prize for Literature for her book Viața începe vineri (Life Begins on Friday). In 2018 she won the professional prize at the European Union Prize for Literature writing contest for her work of short fiction "A Voice".

Two of her most recent books Inocenții/The Innocents(2016) and Prevestirea/The Prophecy (2020) are being translated by Alistair Ian Blyth and will be published at Istros Books.

== Bibliography ==
- Viața începe vineri, Humanitas, 2009 translated as Life begins on Friday by Alistair Ian Blyth, Istros Books, 2016.
- Viitorul începe luni("The Future Begins on Monday"), Humanitas, 2012.
- Inocenții ("The Innocents"), Humanitas, 2016.
- Prevestirea ("The Prophecy"), Humanitas, 2020.
