= Ion Vianu =

Romanian writer and psychiatrist (1934–2024)

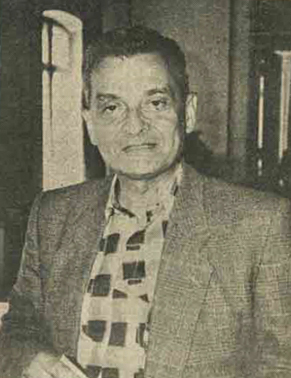
Ion Vianu

Ion Vianu (15 April 1934 – 20 June 2024) was a Romanian writer and psychiatrist, who lived in Switzerland from 1977. He was the son of literary critic Tudor Vianu and his wife, Elena.

Vianu first studied classical philology for two years (1952–1954) as a kind of "self-imposed exile into another world", as he called it, before studying medicine.

== Dissident ==
Ion Vianu was one of those who signed Paul Goma's 1977 open letter that expressed solidarity with the Charter 77 movement in Czechoslovakia. This was done, partly, to put the Romanian communist authorities under pressure to allow him to emigrate. As a result, he was interrogated by the Romanian's secret police, the Securitate, harassed, fired from his University job, and eventually allowed to emigrate to Switzerland. After settling down in Switzerland, he joined the "Geneva Initiative Against Political Psychiatry" and collaborated with Radio Free Europe, discussing attempts to use psychiatry as a form of repression.

After the 1989 Revolution, he became actively involved in the reform of the system of psychiatric treatment in Romania to bring it up to world standards. Vianu, together with his friend Matei Călinescu, published an autobiographical volume, Amintiri în dialog ("Remembrances in Dialogue"). He died on 20 June 2024, at the age of 90.

== Writings ==
Ion Vianu's writings include memoires, novels and critical essays.

He published the novels Caietele lui Ozias (in 2004) and Vasiliu, foi volante (in 2006), both being part of the cycle Arhiva trădării și a mâniei (the Archive of Treason and Wrath), dealing with Romanian society during the communist regime (2nd edition, completed and reviewed, 2016). He also published another two novels, Paramnezii (2005) and, in 2007, "Necredinciosul" (the Unfaithful), inspired by his practice as a psychiatrist in the Western world. In 2009 he published Exerciții de sinceritate (Exercises in sincerity) about his public life under the communist regime during the seventies. In 2010 he published an autobiographical novel, Amor intellectualis, dealing with some major figures from his youth and the tragic destiny of the intelligentsia under the communist regime. He also published collected critical essays under the name Blestem și binecuvântare (Curse & Blessing, 2007), and, in 2008, "Investigații mateine", a biographical essay about the Romanian writer Matei Caragiale. Another volume of critical essays "Apropieri" (Approaches), was published in 2011.

The novel "Vasiliu, foi volante" was translated in Spanish by Ioana Zlotescu in 2010 under the title Vasiliu, hojas sueltas (Aletheia Publishing House).

"Amor intellectualis" was awarded a few prizes, among them Book of the year 2010 by the "România literară" magazine. În 2012 it appeared in Spanish, translated by Victor Ivanovici and Susanna Vásquez (Miguel Gomez ediciones, Malaga).

== Sources ==
- (in Romanian) Ovidiu Şimonca, "«Am vrut să fiu un martor». Interviu cu Ion Vianu", in Observator Cultural
