= Eta Boeriu =

Romanian poet, literary critic and translator

Eta Boeriu

Eta Boeriu (born Margarita Caranica; February 23, 1923 in Turda – November 13, 1984 in Cluj-Napoca) was a Romanian poet, literary critic and translator. Involved in the Sibiu Literary Circle (which disbanded in 1945), she was especially known for her work as a translator of Italian-language Renaissance literature.

== Selected works ==
=== Poetry ===
- Ce vânăt crâng, 1971
- Dezordine de umbre, 1973
- Risipă de iubire, 1976
- Miere de întuneric, 1980
- La capătul meu de înserare, published posthumously, 1985

=== Translation ===
- Giovanni Boccaccio, The Decameron (as Decameronul)
- Dante Alighieri, Divine Comedy (as Divina comedie)
- Baldassare Castiglione, The Book of the Courtier (as Curteanul)
- Francesco Petrarca, Il Canzoniere (as Canţonierul)
