= România Literară =

Romanian magazine

România Literară is a cultural and literary magazine from Romania. In its original edition, it was founded on 1 January 1855 by Vasile Alecsandri and published in Iași until 3 December 1855, when it was suppressed.

The new series appeared on 10 October 1968 as a continuation of Gazeta Literară. It is the Writers' Union of Romania's official magazine.

The magazine is based in Bucharest and is published on a weekly basis.

== The new series ==
The new series began appearing on October 10, 1968, as a continuation of Gazeta literară, which first appeared in 1954 as the primary publication of the Writers' Union.

The Editors-in-Chief were Geo Dumitrescu (1968–1970), Nicolae Breban (1970–1971), and George Ivașcu (1971–1988). Between 1988 and 1989, the magazine was coordinated by Dumitru Radu Popescu. Since 1990, the magazine's director has been Nicolae Manolescu.

As of 2023, regular contributors to România literară include: Nicolae Manolescu (Director), Gabriel Chifu (Executive Director), Răzvan Voncu (Editor-in-Chief), Cristian Pătrășconiu (Editor), Angelo Mitchievici and Vasile Spiridon (Associate Editors), as well as Mircea Mihăieș, Nicolae Prelipceanu, Toma Pavel, Al. Călinescu, Gh. Grigurcu, Alexandra Mănescu, Adrian Alui Gheorghe, Horia Gârbea, Adrian Lesenciuc, Nicolae Oprea, Marina Constantinescu, and Cătălin Davidescu.

Past collaborators include Sorin Lavric, Ioana Pârvulescu, Mihai Zamfir, Daniel Cristea-Enache, Gheorghe Grigurcu, Ion Simuț, Rodica Zafiu, Nora Iuga, Șerban Foarță, Leo Butnaru, and Cristian Teodorescu. Critic Alex Ștefănescu was a long-time contributor until his resignation, which followed Manolescu’s removal of a text critical of the Ponta government's cultural policies.
