= Tudor Vianu =

Romanian thinker

Tudor Vianu

Tudor Vianu (Romanian: [ˈtudor viˈanu]; January 8, 1898 – May 21, 1964) was a Romanian literary critic, art critic, poet, philosopher, academic, and translator. He had a major role on the reception and development of Modernism in Romanian literature and art. He was married to Elena Vianu, herself a literary critic, and was the father of Ion Vianu, a psychiatrist, writer and essayist.

== Biography ==
Vianu was born in Giurgiu to a Jewish family which had converted to Christianity. He completed his primary education in the city, at the Ion Maiorescu Gymnasium, followed by the Gheorghe Lazăr High School in Bucharest. Around 1910, he began writing poetry — which he never published.

In 1915, Vianu became a student at the Department of Philosophy and Law at the University of Bucharest. During the period, Vianu began attending Alexandru Macedonski's Symbolist literary circle, and, in 1916, he published a study on Macedonski and later his own verses in Flacăra magazine.

Upon Romania's entry in World War I, he was drafted into the Romanian Army, trained as an artillery cadet in Botoşani, and took part in the Moldavian campaign. In 1918, he returned to Bucharest, where he was editor of Macedonski's Literatorul, and resumed his studies, graduating in 1919. Vianu also worked on the editorial staff for Constantin Rădulescu-Motru's Ideea Europeană and for Luceafărul. In 1921, he began his long collaboration with Viaţa Românească, while he contributed to Eugen Lovinescu's Sburătorul.

In 1923, he obtained a doctorate in Philosophy at the University of Tübingen, with the thesis Das Wertungsproblem in Schillers Poetik ("The Judgment of Values in Schiller's Poetics"), his first major study in aesthetics (delivered in November 1923). The work was praised by Lucian Blaga, who was subsequently Vianu's colleague during their time as staff members for Gândirea; the two shared an appreciation of Expressionism. With Blaga, he stood for Gândirea's early modernist tendencies, and grew opposed to Nichifor Crainic's intense advocacy of traditionalism (at a time when the magazine's editor, Cezar Petrescu, was occupying a middle position).

With the publishing of his Dualismul artei in 1925 (followed by a long succession of collections of essays and studies), Vianu secured his place in the cultural landscape of modern Romania, and became the titular professor of aesthetics at the University of Bucharest. At around the same period, he distanced himself from Gândirea (which was becoming the mouthpiece of Crainic's far right traditionalism), and instead advocated democratic government.

Throughout the interwar period, Vianu was an adversary of the fascist Iron Guard, and polemized with its press, becoming the target of attacks serialized in Cuvântul. His status as a professor was in peril during the National Legionary State established by the Guard in 1940, and he felt the imminent danger of physical assaults. Anti-Semitic authorities began alluding to his Jewish origins, and several violent remarks were aimed at him. Following the Legionary Rebellion and the Guard's defeat, he sent a congratulatory telegram to the Conducător (lit. 'Leader', the equivalent title to 'il Duce' and 'der Führer') Ion Antonescu. In 1945, after the end of Antonescu's regime and World War II, he was the recipient of a letter from his friend Eugène Ionesco: the document forms a list of intellectuals whom Ionesco harshly criticized for their pro-Iron Guard activism (they include Nae Ionescu, Mircea Eliade, Emil Cioran, Constantin Noica, Dan Botta, Mircea Vulcănescu, Horia Stamatu, Paul Sterian, Mihail Polihroniade, Haig Acterian, Dumitru Cristian Amzăr, Costin Deleanu and Paul Deleanu).

In charge of Romania's National Theater in 1945, ambassador to the Socialist Federal Republic of Yugoslavia in 1946, Vianu became an honorary member of the Romanian Academy starting in 1955. He made several concessions to the new Communist authorities, which Ion Vianu has described as "purely formal" (an assessment shared by Ion Papuc, who argued that Vianu joined the Romanian Communist Party "for lack of a way out"). He gave active support to literary figures who, as former members of the Iron Guard, faced imprisonment — Vianu was a defense witness in the trial of Traian Herseni, and, with Mihai Ralea, the author of an appeal for the release of Petre Ţuţea.

During his late years, he translated several of William Shakespeare's works into Romanian. In the beginning of summer 1964, he completed Arghezi, poet al omului ("Arghezi, Poet of Mankind"), carrying the subtitle Cântare omului ("A Chant to Mankind"), a work in the field of comparative literature. It began printing on the very day of its author's death in Bucharest, which was due to a heart attack.

== Philosophy ==
Vianu's investigations into cultural history, coupled with his vivid interest in the sociology of culture, allowed him to develop an influential philosophy, which attributed culture a seminal role in shaping human destiny. According to his views, culture, which had liberated humans from natural imperatives, was an asset that intellectuals were required to preserve by intervening in social life.

In his analysis of the Age of Enlightenment and 19th-century philosophy, Vianu celebrated Hegel for having unified the competing trends of universalist Rationalism and ethnocentric Historicism. A sizable part of his analysis was focused on the modern crisis of values, which he attributed to the inability of values to impose themselves on all individuals, and which he evidenced in the ideas of philosophers as diverse as Friedrich Nietzsche, Karl Marx, and Søren Kierkegaard.

== Selected works ==
- Dualismul artei ("The Dualism of Art") - 1925;
- Fragmente moderne ("Modernist Pieces") - 1925;
- Poezia lui Eminescu ("The Poetry of Eminescu") - 1930;
- Arta și Frumosul ("Art and Beauty") -1932;
- Idealul clasic al omului ("The Classic Idea of Man") -1934;
- Estetica ("Aesthetics"), a work in two volumes - 1934–1936;
- Filosofie și poezie ("Philosophy and Poetry") - 1937;
- Istorism și naționalism ("Historicism and Nationalism") - 1938;
- Introducere in teoria valorilor ("Introduction to the Theory of Values") - 1942;
- Istoria literaturii române moderne ("The History of Modern Romanian Literature"), in collaboration with Şerban Cioculescu and Vladimir Streinu - 1944;
- Filosofia Culturii (Philosophy of Culture) - 1945;
- Dicționar de maxime (comentat) ("Dictionary of Maxims (Annotated)") - 1962.
