= Marta Petreu =

Romanian philosopher, literary critic, essayist and poet

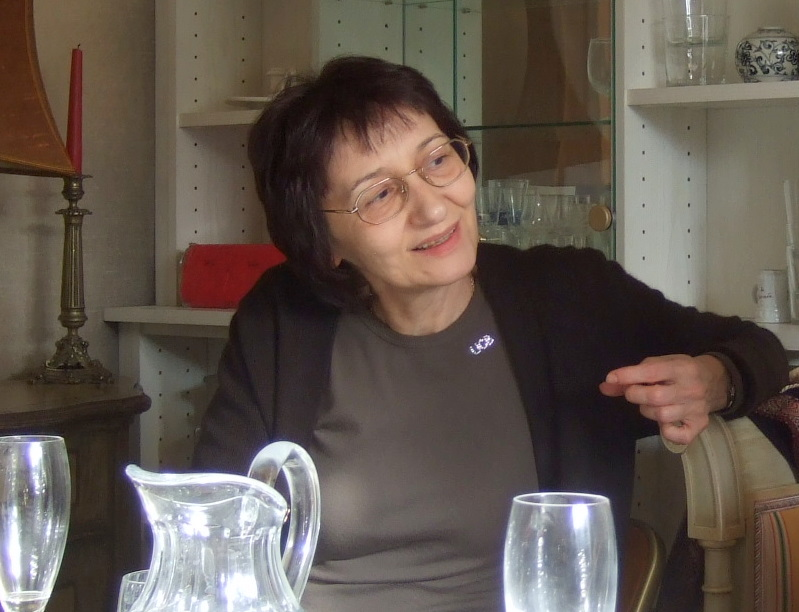
- Marta Petreu in February 2011
- Born: Rodica Crişan; 14 March 1955 (age 71); Jucu, Romania
- Occupations: Philosopher; literary critic; essayist; poet

Marta Petreu is the pen name of Rodica Marta Vartic, née Rodica Crisan (born 14 March 1955), a Romanian philosopher, literary critic, essayist and poet. A professor of philosophy at the Babeş-Bolyai University in Cluj-Napoca, she has published eight books of essays and seven of poetry, and is the editor of the monthly magazine Apostrof. Petreu is also noted as a historian of fascism, which she notably dealt with in her book about the controversial stances of philosopher Emil Cioran (An Infamous Past: E. M. Cioran and the Rise of Fascism in Romania, 1999).

== Writings ==
=== Novels ===
- Acasă, pe cîmpia Armaghedonului, 2011
- Supa de la miezul nopţii, 2017

=== Essayst and historian of philosophy ===
- Teze neterminate, 1991
- Jocurile manierismului logic, 1995
- Ionescu în ţara tatălui, 2001
- Filosofia lui Caragiale, 2003
- Blaga, între legionari şi comunişti (Blaga, between legionnaires and communists), 2021

== Presence in English language anthologies ==
- Testament - 400 Years of Romanian Poetry - 400 de ani de poezie românească - bilingual edition - Daniel Ioniță (editor and principal translator) with Daniel Reynaud, Adriana Paul & Eva Foster - Editura Minerva, 2019 - ISBN 978-973-21-1070-6
- Romanian Poetry from its Origins to the Present - bilingual edition English/Romanian- Daniel Ioniță (editor and principal translator) with Daniel Reynaud, Adriana Paul and Eva Foster - Australian-Romanian Academy Publishing - 2020 - ISBN 978-0-9953502-8-1 ; LCCN - 202090783
