= Nicolae Manolescu =

Romanian literary critic (1939–2024)

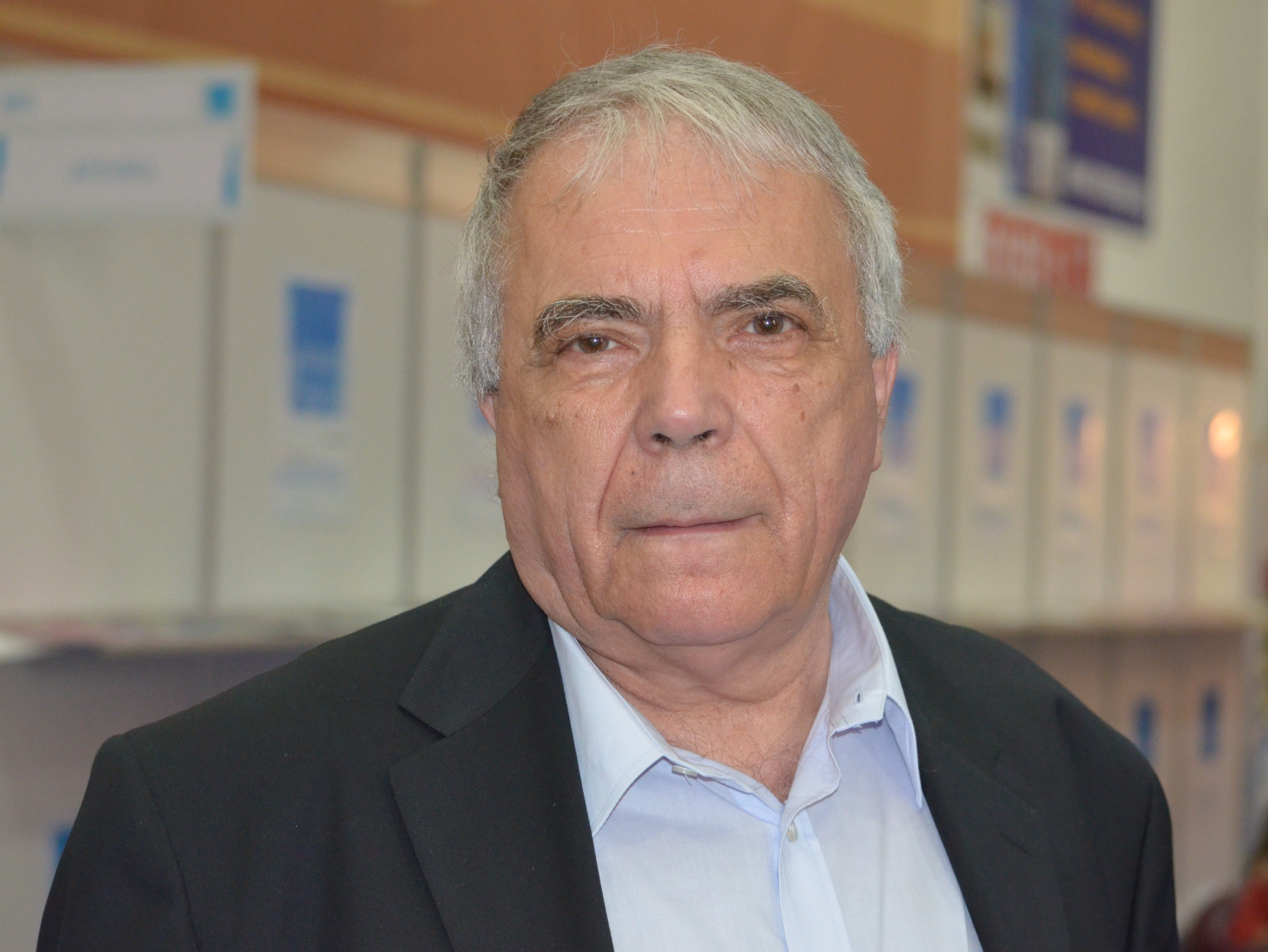
Manolescu in 2012

Nicolae Manolescu (Romanian pronunciation: [nikoˈla.e manoˈlesku]; 27 November 1939 – 23 March 2024) was a Romanian literary critic. Elected a corresponding member of the Romanian Academy in 1997, he was upgraded to titular member in 2013.

== Life and career ==
Manolescu was born in Râmnicu Vâlcea, the son of Petru Apolzan, a philosophy teacher, and his wife Sabina Apolzan (née Manolescu), a French teacher. After attending high schools in his hometown and in Sibiu, he studied philology at the University of Bucharest from 1956 to 1962, with an interruption in 1958–1959, when he was expelled from the university, due to critical opinions voiced against Gheorghe Gheorghiu Dej and the Romanian Communist regime.

After the Romanian Revolution of 1989, he was a founding member of the Civic Alliance (AC) in November 1990, and, after July 1991, began a political career as leader of the minor Civic Alliance Party (PAC), a group that had split from the Alliance to pursue a more political activism, being its candidate for presidency in the 1992 elections; Manolescu subsequently represented the party in the Senate. In 1993 Nicolae Manolescu was a leader of a short lived PNL, a Romanian political party which in 1998 had merged with the National Liberal Party (PNL). Prior to its merger, Manolescu was its leader during the 1996 Romanian general election; as the party's presidential candidate, he finished ninth with 0.7% of the vote. Until 2000, he was a member of the PNL National Council, when he resigned from this position and retreated from political life.

Manolescu published over 40 volumes on Romanian literature, the most acclaimed being A Critical History of Romanian Literature (vol.1) and a history of Romanian novels, entitled Arca lui Noe. His distinction between "doric", "ionic", and "corinthic" novels originated in the traditional orders of the columns of Ancient Greek temples, and covers the distinction between realistic, psychological first person narratives and contemporary, postmodern novels. As an editor of România Literară literary magazine, he reached a record in reviewing books for almost 30 years. He was also the host of the popular Profesiunea mea, cultura ("My Profession Is Culture"), a talk show on cultural matters, aired by Pro TV between 1998 and 2001.

Manolescu was a professor at the University of Bucharest, from which he received a Ph.D. in Letters. He was the President of the Romanian Writers' Union, and was designated the Romanian ambassador to UNESCO in 2006.

In December 2000, he was awarded by the President of Romania the National Order of Faithful Service, Grand Cross rank, and in December 2008, the Order of the Star of Romania, Grand Cross rank.

Manolescu died at the Elias Hospital in Bucharest, on 23 March 2024, aged 84.
