= Sibiu Literary Circle =

The Sibiu Literary Circle (Romanian: Cercul literar de la Sibiu) was a literary group created during World War II in Sibiu to promote the modernist liberal ideas of Eugen Lovinescu.

The group was formed around Lucian Blaga and other intellectuals from Cluj, who had settled in Sibiu after the Romanian University of Cluj had moved there in 1940, in the wake of the Hungarian occupation of Northern Transylvania. The most active members of the group were Ion Negoițescu, Radu Stanca, Ion Dezideriu Sîrbu, Cornel Regman, Ștefan Augustin Doinaș, Nicolae Balotă, Eugen Todoran, Eta Boeriu, Radu Enescu, and Ovidiu Cotruș. The group disbanded in 1945.
