= Writers' Union of Romania =

Professional association of writers in Romania

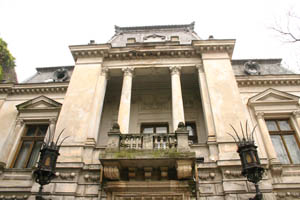
Writers' Union of Romania building (Casa Monteoru-Catargi) in Bucharest

The Writers' Union of Romania (Romanian: Uniunea Scriitorilor din România), founded in March 1949, is a professional association of writers in Romania. It also has a subsidiary in Chișinău, Republic of Moldova. The Writers' Union of Romania was created by the communist regime by taking over the former Romanian Writers' Society (Societatea Scriitorilor Români), which had been established in 1908.

The Union organizes the annual Days and Nights of Literature Festival, and the awarding of the prestigious Ovid Prize for Literature.

== Presidents ==
- Zaharia Stancu (active, 1949–1956)
- Mihail Sadoveanu (honorary, 1949–1956; active, 1956–1961)
- Mihai Beniuc (1962–1964)
- Demostene Botez (1964–1966)
- Zaharia Stancu (1966–1974)
- Virgil Teodorescu (1974–1978)
- George Macovescu (1978–1982)
- Dumitru Radu Popescu (1982–1990)
- Mircea Dinescu (1990–1996)
- Laurențiu Ulici (1996–2000)
- Eugen Uricaru (2000–2005)
- Nicolae Manolescu (2005–2024?)

Tudor Arghezi was honorary president from 1962 to 1967, as was Victor Eftimiu in 1972; Ștefan Augustin Doinaș was chosen for this function in 1990 as well.

== Notable members ==
- Ana Blandiana, poet, essayist, and political figure
- Paul Cernat, essayist
- Ioana Crăciunescu, poet and actress
- Vasile Dîncu, Minister of National Defence
- Ion Hobana, executive secretary 1972–90
- Adriana Iliescu, writer
- Sorin Lavric, writer (until 2020)
- Eugenia Mihalea, poet
- Aurel Pantea, poet
- Nicolae Pogonaru, novelist
