= Ion Luca Caragiale =

Romanian writer, political commentator and journalist (1852–1912)

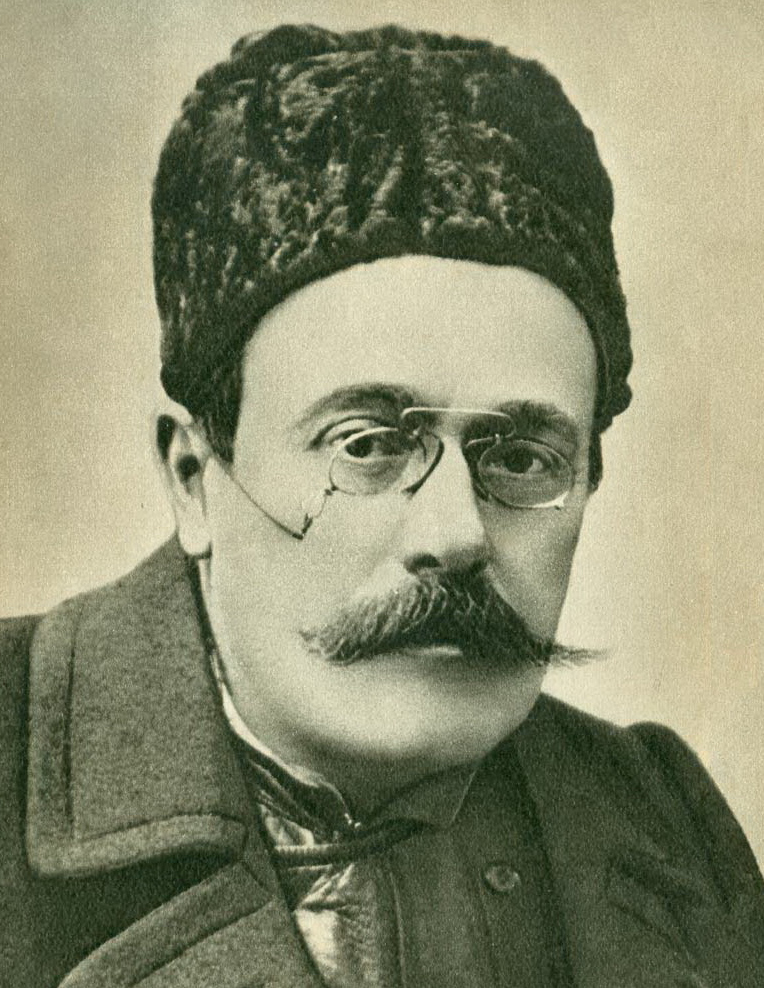
- Born: 30 January 1852; Haimanale, Principality of Wallachia (present-day I. L. Caragiale, Dâmbovița, Romania)
- Died: 9 June 1912 (aged 60); Berlin, German Empire (present-day Berlin, Germany)
- Resting place: Bellu Cemetery, Bucharest
- Occupations: Short story writer; playwright; journalist; essayist; actor; translator; poet; civil servant; restaurateur; political commentator
- Spouse: Alexandrina Burelly (m. 1889)
- Children: Mateiu; Luca; Ecaterina
- Writing career
- Pen name: Car.; Ein rumänischer Patriot; Luca; i; Ion; Palicar
- Period: 1873–1912
- Genres: Drama; comedy; tragedy; short story; sketch story; novella; satire; parody; aphorism; fantasy; reportage; memoir; fairy tale; epigram; fable
- Subjects: Everyday life; morals and manners; politics; social criticism; literary criticism; music criticism
- Movements: Junimism; Naturalism; Neoclassicism; Neoromanticism; Realism

Signature
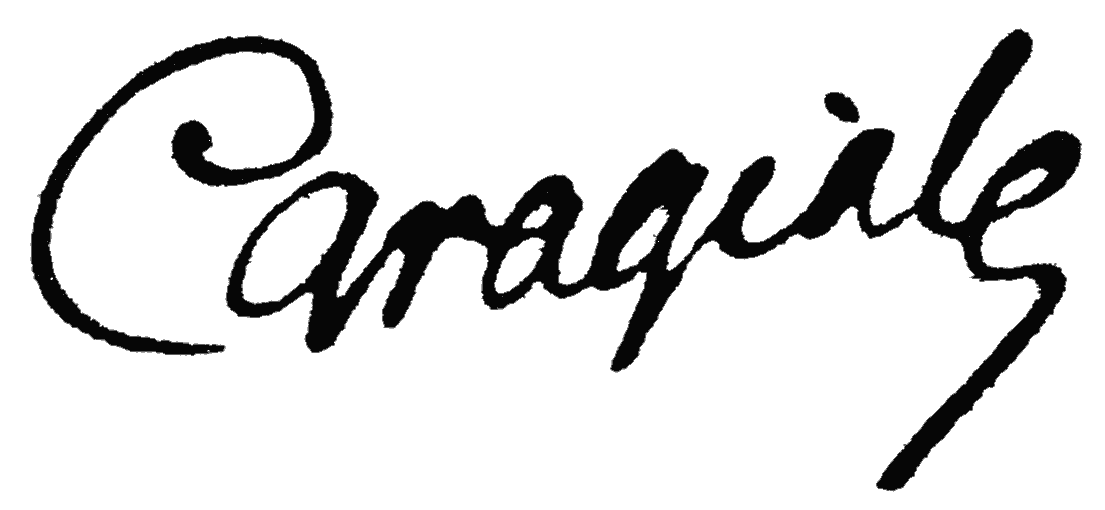

Ion Luca Caragiale (Romanian pronunciation: [iˈon ˈluka karaˈdʒjale]; 13 February [O.S. 1 February] 1852 – 9 June 1912), commonly referred to as I. L. Caragiale, was a Romanian playwright, short story writer, poet, theater manager, political commentator and journalist. Leaving behind an important cultural legacy, he is considered one of the greatest playwrights in Romanian language and literature, as well as one of its most important writers and a leading representative of local humour. Alongside Mihai Eminescu, Ioan Slavici and Ion Creangă, he is seen as one of the main representatives of Junimea, an influential literary society with which he nonetheless parted during the second half of his life. His work, spanning four decades, covers the ground between Neoclassicism, Realism, and Naturalism, building on an original synthesis of foreign and local influences.

Although few in number, Caragiale's plays constitute the most accomplished expression of Romanian theatre, as well as being important venues for criticism of late-19th-century Romanian society. They include the comedies O noapte furtunoasă, Conu Leonida față cu reacțiunea, O scrisoare pierdută, and the tragedy Năpasta. In addition to these, Caragiale authored a large number of essays, articles, short stories, novellas and sketch stories, as well as occasional works of poetry and autobiographical texts such as Din carnetul unui vechi sufleur. In many cases, his creations were first published in one of several magazines he edited — Claponul, Vatra, and Epoca. In some of his later fiction writings, including La hanul lui Mânjoală, Kir Ianulea, Abu-Hasan, Pastramă trufanda and Calul dracului, Caragiale adopted the fantasy genre or turned to historical fiction.

Ion Luca Caragiale was interested in the politics of the Romanian Kingdom, and oscillated between the liberal current and conservatism. Most of his satirical works target the liberal republicans and the National Liberals, evidencing both his respect for their rivals at Junimea and his connections with the literary critic Titu Maiorescu. He came to clash with National Liberal leaders such as Dimitrie Sturdza and Bogdan Petriceicu Hasdeu, and was a lifelong adversary of the Symbolist poet Alexandru Macedonski. As a result of these conflicts, the most influential of Caragiale's critics barred his access to the cultural establishment for several decades. During the 1890s, Caragiale rallied with the radical movement of George Panu, before associating with the Conservative Party. After having decided to settle in Berlin, he came to voice strong criticism for Romanian politicians of all colours in the wake of the 1907 Romanian Peasants' Revolt, and ultimately joined the Conservative-Democratic Party of Tache Ionescu.

He was both a friend and rival to writers such as Mihai Eminescu, Titu Maiorescu, and Barbu Ștefănescu Delavrancea, while maintaining contacts with, among others, the Junimist essayist Iacob Negruzzi, the socialist philosopher Constantin Dobrogeanu-Gherea, the literary critic Paul Zarifopol, the poets George Coșbuc and Mite Kremnitz, the psychologist Constantin Rădulescu-Motru, and the Transylvanian poet and activist Octavian Goga. Ion Luca was the nephew of Costache and Iorgu Caragiale, who were major figures of the 19th century Romanian theatre. His sons Mateiu and Luca were both modernist writers.

== Biography ==
=== Background and name ===
Ion Luca Caragiale was born into a family of Greek descent, whose members first arrived in Wallachia soon after 1812, during the rule of Prince Ioan Gheorghe Caragea—Ștefan Caragiali, as his grandfather was known locally, worked as a cook for the court in Bucharest.

Ion Luca's father, who reportedly originated from the Ottoman capital of Istanbul, settled in Prahova County as the curator of the Mărgineni Monastery (which, at the time, belonged to the Greek Orthodox Saint Catherine's Monastery of Mount Sinai). Known to locals as Luca Caragiali, he later built a reputation as a lawyer and judge in Ploiești, and married Ecaterina, the daughter of a merchant from the Transylvanian town of Brașov. Her maiden name was given as Alexovici (Alexevici) or as Karaboa (Caraboa). She is known to have been Greek herself, and, according to historian Lucian Nastasă, some of her relatives were Hungarian members of the Tabay family. The couple also had a daughter, named Lenci.

Ion Luca's uncles, Costache and Iorgu Caragiale, managed theater troupes and were very influential figures in the development of early Romanian theatre — in Wallachia and Moldavia alike. Luca Caragiali had himself performed with his brothers during his youth, before opting to settle down. All three had stood criticism for not taking part in the Wallachian Revolution, and defended themselves through a brochure printed in 1848. The Caragiali brothers had two sisters, Ecaterina and Anastasia.

Especially in his old age, the writer emphasized his family's humble background and his status as a self-made man. On one occasion, he defined the landscape of his youth as "the quagmires of Ploiești". Although it prompted his biographer Constantin Dobrogeanu-Gherea to define him as "a proletarian", Caragiale's account was disputed by several other researchers, who noted that the family had a good social standing.

Ion Luca Caragiale was discreet about his ethnic origin for the larger part of his life. In parallel, his foreign roots came to the attention of his adversaries, who used them as arguments in various polemics. As his relations with Caragiale degenerated into hostility, Mihai Eminescu is known to have referred to his former friend as "that Greek swindler". Aware of such treatment, the writer considered all references to his lineage to be insults. On several occasions, he preferred to indicate that he was "of obscure birth".

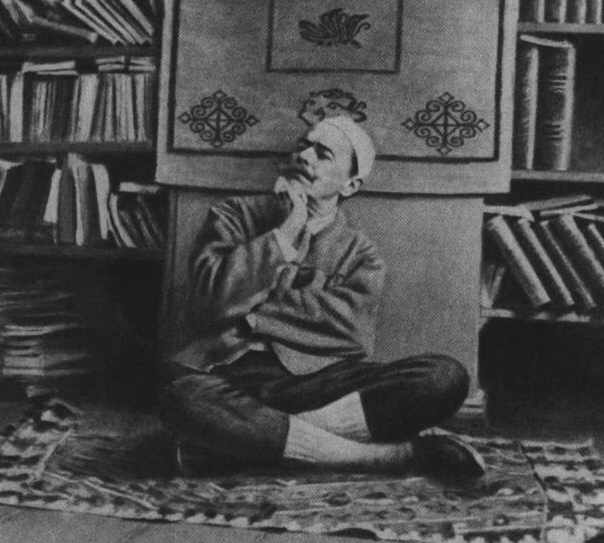
Caragiale in Balkan costume, photographed ca. 1900

Nevertheless, as literary critic Tudor Vianu noted, Caragiale's outlook on life was explicitly Balkanic and Oriental, which, in Vianu's view, mirrored a type "which must have been found in his lineage". A similar opinion was expressed by Paul Zarifopol, who speculated that Caragiale's conservative mindset was possibly owed to the "lazyness of one true Oriental" (elsewhere, he referred to the writer as "a lazy southerner, fitted with definitely supranormal intelligence and imagination").

In his main work on the history of Romanian literature, George Călinescu included Caragiale among a group of "Balkan" writers, whose middle class status and often foreign origin, he argued, set them apart irrespective of their period—others in this category were, in chronological order, Anton Pann, Tudor Arghezi, Ion Minulescu, Urmuz, Mateiu Caragiale, and Ion Barbu. In contrast, critic Garabet Ibrăileanu proposed that Caragiale's Wallachian origin was of particular importance, serving to explain his political choices and alleged social bias.

On one occasion, Caragiale mentioned that his paternal grandfather was "a Greek cook". In several contexts, he referred to his roots as being in the island of Hydra. In one of his photographs, he posed in Oriental costume and sitting cross-legged, which was interpreted by Vianu as an additional reference to his Balkan background. Two of his biographers, Zarifopol and Șerban Cioculescu, noted that a section of Caragiale's fairy tale Kir Ianulea was a likely self-reference: in that fragment of text, the Christian Devil, disguised as an Arvanite trader, is shown taking pride in his Romanian language skills.

Investigations carried out by the Center of Theatric Research in Athens, Greece and made public in 2002 offered an alternative take on the Caragiales' origin. According to this perspective, Ștefan Caragiali was a native of Kefalonia, and his original surname, Karaialis, was changed on Prince Caragea's request. Various authors also believe that Caragiale's ancestors were Albanian or Aromanian.

Originally, Ion Luca was known as Ioanne L. Caragiali. His family and friends knew him as Iancu or, rarely, Iancuțu—both being antiquated hypocoristics of Ion. The definitive full version of his name features the syllable ca twice in a row, which is generally avoided in Romanian due to its scatological connotations. It has however become one of the few cacophonies accepted by the Romanian Academy.

=== Early years ===
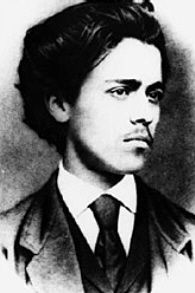
The adolescent Caragiale

Born in the village of Haimanale, Prahova County (the present-day I. L. Caragiale commune, Dâmbovița County), Caragiale was educated in Ploiești. During his early years, as he later indicated, he learned reading and writing with a teacher at the Romanian Orthodox Church of Saint George. Soon after, he was taught literary Romanian by the Transylvanian-born Bazilie Dragoșescu (whose influence on his use of the language he was to acknowledge in one of his later works). At the age of seven, he witnessed enthusiastic celebrations of the Danubian Principalities' union, with the election of Moldavia's Alexandru Ioan Cuza as Prince of Wallachia; Cuza's subsequent reforms were to be an influence on the political choices Caragiale made in his old age. The new ruler visited his primary school later in 1859, being received with enthusiasm by Dragoșescu and all his pupils.

Caragiale completed gymnasium at the Sfinții Petru și Pavel school in the city, and never pursued any form of higher education. He was probably enlisted directly in the second grade, as records do not show him to have attended or graduated the first year. Notably, Caragiale was taught history by Constantin Iennescu, who was later the mayor of Ploiești. The young Caragiale opted to follow in his uncles' footsteps, and was taught declamation and mimic art by Costache at the latter's theater school in Bucharest, where he was accompanied by his mother and sister. It is also probable that he was a supernumerary actor for the National Theater Bucharest. He was not able to find full employment in this field, and, around the age of 18, worked as a copyist for the Prahova County Tribunal. Throughout his life, Caragiale refused to talk about his training in the theater, and hid it from the people closest to him (including his wife Alexandrina Burelly, who came from an upper middle class environment).

In 1866, Caragiale witnessed Cuza's toppling by a coalition of conservatives and liberals — as he later acknowledged in his Grand Hotel "Victoria Română", he and his friends agreed to support the move by voting "yes" during a subsequent plebiscite, and, with tacit approval from the new authorities, even did so several times each. By the age of 18, he was an enthusiastic supporter of the liberal current, and sympathized with its republican ideals. In 1871, he witnessed the Republic of Ploiești — a short-lived stated created by the liberal groups, in an attempt to oust Domnitor Carol I (the future King of Romania). Later in life, as his opinions veered towards conservatism, Caragiale ridiculed both the attempted coup d'état and his participation in it.

He returned to Bucharest later that year, after manager Mihail Pascaly hired him as one of the prompts at the National Theater in the capital, a period about which he reminisced in his Din carnetul unui vechi sufleur. The poet Mihai Eminescu, with whom Ion Luca was to have cordial relations as well as rivalries, had previously been employed for the same position by the manager Iorgu Caragiale. In addition to his growing familiarity with the repertoire, the young Caragiale educated himself by reading the philosophical works of Enlightenment-era philosophes. It was also recorded that, at some point between 1870 and 1872, he was employed in the same capacity by the Moldavian National Theater in Iași. During the period, Caragiale also proofread for various publications and worked as a tutor.

=== Literary debut ===
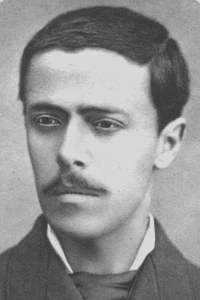
Caragiale in his youth

Ion Luca made his literary debut in 1873, at the age of 21, with poems and humorous chronicles printed in G. Dem. Teodorescu's liberal-inspired satirical magazine, Ghimpele. He published relatively few articles under various pen names — among them Car., the contraction of his family name, and the more elaborate Palicar. He mostly performed basic services for the editorial staff and its printing press, given that, after Luca Caragiali died in 1870, he was the sole provider for his mother and sister. Following his return to Bucharest, he became even more involved with the radical and republican wing of the liberal trend—a movement commonly referred to as "the Reds". As he later confessed, he frequently attended its congresses, witnessing the speeches held by Reds leader C. A. Rosetti; he thus became intimately acquainted with a Populist discourse, which he later parodied in his works. Working for Ghimpele, he made the acquaintance of republican writer N. T. Orășanu.

Several of his articles for Ghimpele were sarcastic in tone, and targeted various literary figures of the day. In June 1874, Caragiale amused himself at the expense of N. D. Popescu-Popnedea, the author of popular almanacs, whose taste he questioned. Soon after, he ridiculed the rising poet Alexandru Macedonski, who had publicized his claim that he was a "Count Geniadevsky", and thus of Polish origin. The article contributed by Caragiale, in which he speculated that Macedonski (referred to with the anagram Aamsky) was using the name solely because it reminded people of the word "genius", was the first act in a long polemic between the two literary figures. Caragiale turned Aamsky into a character on his own, envisaging his death as a result of overwork in editing magazines "for the country's political development".

Caragiale also contributed poetry to Ghimpele: two sonnets, and a series of epigrams (one of which was another attack on Macedonski). The first of these works, an 1873 sonnet dedicated to the baritone Agostino Mazzoli, is believed to have been his first contribution to the belles-lettres (as opposed to journalism).

In 1896, Macedonski reflected with irony:

"As early as 1872, the clients of some beer gardens in the capital have had the occasion to welcome among them of a noisy young man, a bizarre spirit who seemed destined, were he to have devoted himself to letters or the arts, to be entirely original. Indeed, this young man's appearance, his hasty gestures, his sarcastic smile [...], his always irritated and mocking voice, as well as his sophistic reasoning easily attracted attention."

Over the following years, Caragiale collaborated on various mouthpieces of the newly created National Liberal Party, and, in May 1877, created the satirical magazine Claponul. Later in 1877, he also translated a series of French-language plays for the National Theater: Alexandre Parodi's Rome vaincue (it was showcased in late 1877-early 1878), Paul Déroulède's L'Hetman, and Eugène Scribe's Une camaraderie. Together with the French republican Frédéric Damé, he also headed a short-lived journal, Națiunea Română.

It was also then that he contributed a serialized overview of Romanian theater, published by the newspaper România Liberă, in which Caragiale attacked the inferiority of Romanian dramaturgy and the widespread recourse to plagiarism. According to literary historian Perpessicius, the series constituted "one of the most solid critical contributions to the history of our theater".

Macedonski later alleged that, in his contributions to the liberal newspapers, the young writer had libeled several Conservative Party politicians—when researching this period, Șerban Cioculescu concluded that the accusation was false, and that only one polemical article on a political topic could be traced back to Caragiale.

=== Timpul and Claponul ===
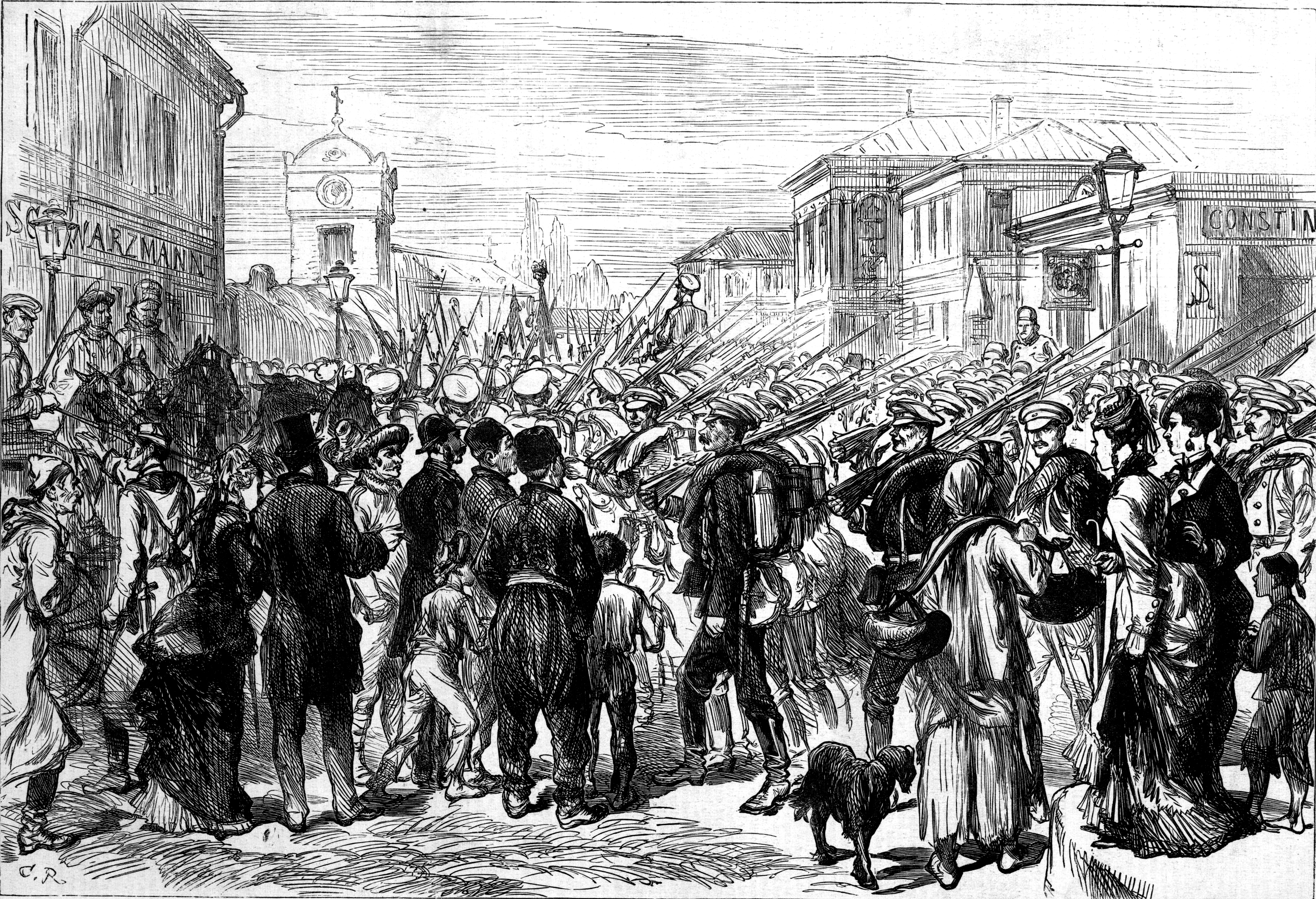
The Russian Army in Bucharest, print in The Illustrated London News (1877)

The young journalist began drifting away from National Liberal politics soon after 1876, when the group came to power with Ion Brătianu as Premier. According to many versions, Eminescu, who was working on the editorial staff of the main Conservative newspaper, Timpul, asked to be joined by Caragiale and the Transylvanian prose writer Ioan Slavici, who were both employed by the paper. This order of events remains unclear, and depends on sources saying that Eminescu was employed by the paper in March 1876. Other testimonies indicate that it was actually Eminescu who arrived last, beginning work in January 1878.

Slavici later recalled that three of them engaged in lengthy discussions at Timpul's headquarters on Calea Victoriei and in Eminescu's house on Sfinților Street, where they planned to co-author a massive work on Romanian grammar. According to literary historian Tudor Vianu, the relationship between Caragiale and Eminescu partly replicated that between the latter and the Moldavian Ion Creangă.

Over that period, Timpul and Eminescu were engaged in a harsh polemic with the Reds, and especially their leader Rosetti. It was also then that Romania entered the Russo-Turkish War as a means to secure her complete independence from the Ottoman Empire. Caragiale reportedly took little interest in editing Timpul over that period, but it is assumed that several unsigned chronicles, covering foreign events, are his contributions (as are two short story adaptations of works by the American author Edgar Allan Poe, both published by Timpul in spring-summer 1878). The newspaper was actually issued as a collaborative effort, which makes it hard to identify the authors of many other articles. According to Slavici, Caragiale occasionally completed unfinished contributions by Eminescu whenever the latter had to leave unexpectedly.

He concentrated instead on Claponul, which he edited and wrote single-handedly for the duration of the war. Zarifopol believed that, through the series of light satires he contributed for the magazine, Caragiale was trying out his style, and thus "entertaining the suburbanites, in order to study them". A piece he authored of the time featured an imaginary barber and amateur artist, Năstase Știrbu, who drew a direct parallel between art, literature and cutting hair—both the theme and the character were to be reused in his later works. Similarly, a fragment of prose referring to two inseparable friends, Șotrocea and Motrocea, was to serve as the first draft for the Lache and Mache series in Momente și schițe. Another notable work of the time is Pohod la șosea, a rhyming reportage documenting the Russian Army's arrival to Bucharest, and the street reactions to the event. Claponul ceased publication in early 1878.

=== Junimea reception ===
It was probably through Eminescu that Ion Luca Caragiale came into contact with the Iași-based Junimea, the influential literary society which was also a center for anti-National Liberal politics. Initially, Caragiale met with Junimea founder, the critic and politician Titu Maiorescu, during a visit to the house of Dr. Kremnitz, physician to the family of Domnitor Carol I. The doctor's wife and Maiorescu's sister-in-law, Mite Kremnitz, was herself a writer, and later became Eminescu's lover. During several meetings, Caragiale was asked by Maiorescu to write down a series of aphorisms in an album. His concise musings are contemplative in tone, and some of them have been construed by some present-day reviewers to contain evidence of misanthropy and, to a certain degree, misogyny.

In 1878, Caragiale and Maiorescu left for Iași, where they attended Junimea's 15th anniversary, and where Caragiale read his first draft of the celebrated play O noapte furtunoasă. The work, ridiculing the petite bourgeoisie's mix of liberal values and demagogy over a background of superficial culture, immediately struck a chord with the majority-conservative grouping. Its reception was one of the pivotal moments in the second period of Junimea activities, characterized by the society's expansion to Bucharest and its patronage of the arts. Other writers who marked this stage were Creangă, Slavici, Vasile Alecsandri and Vasile Conta—together with Caragiale, they soon became the foremost representatives of Junimea's direct influence on literature. To varying degrees, they all complimented the main element of Junimist discourse, Maiorescu criticism of "forms without a foundation"—the concept itself referred to the negative impact of modernization, which, Junimea argued, had by then only benefited the upper strata of Romanian society, leaving the rest with an incomplete and increasingly falsified culture.

Ion Luca Caragiale also associated with Junimea's mouthpiece, Convorbiri Literare, and continued to contribute there even after 1885, when the society began to decline in importance. It was here that all his major comedies were first presented to the public. He did not, however, join Petre P. Carp's movement, which aimed to consolidate Junimea as a third force in Romanian politics, and remained a staunch independent over the following years. Caragiale was nevertheless associated with the Junimist journal Constituționalul.

In early January 1879, O noapte furtunoasă was first staged by the National Theater. Its production brought the first association between Caragiale and comedian Mihai Mateescu, who went on to portray some of his most popular characters. The play was a hit, and acclaim reached Caragiale despite the fact that he had refused to have his name printed on the posters. Caragiale was soon outraged to discover that, by the second staging, his text had been toned down by the government-appointed Head of Theaters, the National Liberal Ion Ghica. When he asked for an official explanation, O noapte furtunoasă was removed from the season's program. Over the following years, independent troupes staged the play or its plagiarized versions for their own benefit. It was restored to the National Theater's repertoire in 1883, and was so successful that state theaters in cities such as Craiova and Iași made efforts to have it included in their own programs.

Caragiale subsequently took part in directing his plays at the National Theater, where his main collaborator was actor and manager Constantin I. Nottara. Together, they are credited with having put a stop to the techniques favored by Mihail Pascaly, replacing emphatic declamation with a more natural and studied perspective on acting.

=== Inspector general ===
In 1880, he printed Conu Leonida față cu reacțiunea — a play centered on an uncultured "Red" pensioner and his naive wife, who overhear a street brawl and believe that a revolution is imminent. It was also then that his first memoirs from the world of theater were published, which coincided with the release of Ion Creangă's own book of memoirs, the well-known volume Amintiri din copilărie.

Accompanied by Maiorescu, Caragiale left for Austria-Hungary. In Vienna, the two of them attended a staging of William Shakespeare's A Midsummer Night's Dream, hosted by the Burgtheater. He was practically unemployed after returning, and, in 1881, gave up his position at Timpul. Nevertheless, that autumn, V. A. Urechia, Minister of Education in the Ion Brătianu National Liberal cabinet, assigned him the office of inspector general for the Moldavian counties of Suceava and Neamț. Profiting from the proximity between his new residence and Iași, Ion Luca Caragiale became a regular participant in Junimea's activities, becoming good friends with some of its most important representatives (Iacob Negruzzi, Vasile Pogor, and Petru Th. Missir). With Negruzzi, he dramatized Hatmanul Baltag, a short story by Nicolae Gane.

He became close to Veronica Micle, a woman writer who was also Eminescu's mistress. For a while, Caragiale and Micle had a love affair, although she continued to see the poet. This caused the friendship between Eminescu and Caragiale to sour. The former was jealous of Cargiale's relations with Micle, while she resented the poet's affair with Mite Kremnitz.

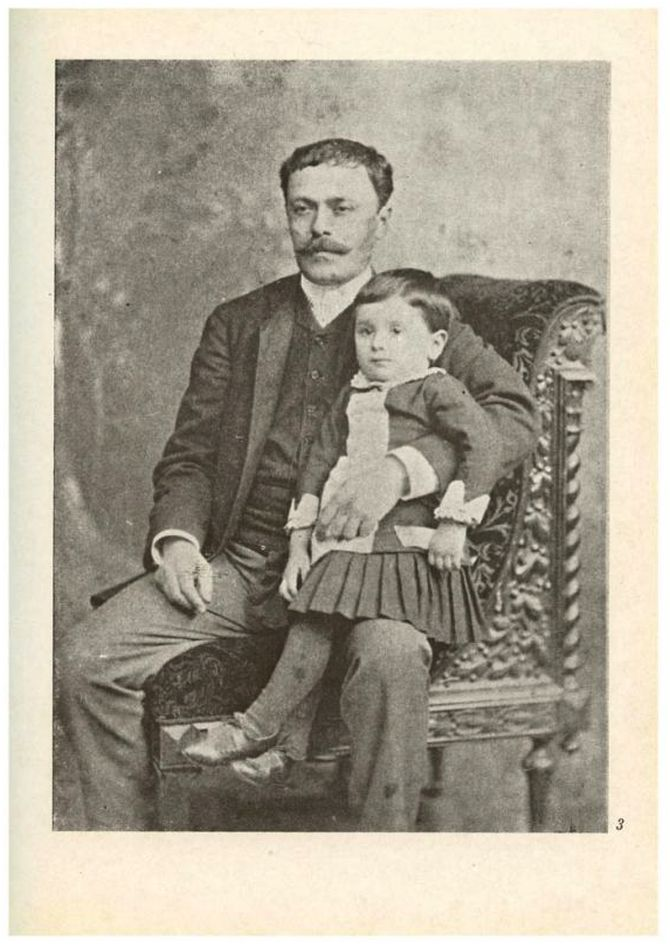
Ion Luca and Mateiu Caragiale before 1900

Just one year after, Caragiale was moved back to Wallachia, becoming inspector general in Argeș and Vâlcea. He was ultimately stripped of this position in 1884, and found himself on the verge of bankruptcy; he thus accepted the lowly position of clerk for the civil registry administration. It is probably during this period that his melodrama O soacră was written and published — Caragiale, who was aware of its faults, indicated that it was a work from his youth, and dated it to 1876. His account is challenged by several details in the text.

In June 1883, while visiting Maiorescu's house, he received news that Eminescu had suffered the first in a series of dementia attacks (owing to a disease that was to kill him in 1889). Caragiale reportedly broke into tears. This succession of events also saw him becoming involved in conflicts among Junimea members: like Pogor, Caragiale objected to the style of Vasile Alecsandri, an aged Junimist poet, and was shocked to find out that he was ridiculing the much younger Eminescu. He thus decided to criticize Alecsandri in public, during a March 1884 meeting of the society—Maiorescu recorded in his private notes that "[...] Caragiale [was] aggressive and rude toward Alecsandri."

Caragiale's wealthy relative, Catinca Momulo Cardini (commonly known Catinca Momuloaia), who was the widow of a famous restaurateur and the cousin of his mother Ecaterina, died in 1885, and the writer had the prospect of inheriting a large fortune. He nonetheless became involved in a trial with Momuloaia's other relatives, which prolonged itself until the early 20th century.

=== First major successes ===
Months after this, his new comedy, O scrisoare pierdută, was first shown to the public. A fresco of conflicting political machines, provincial corruption, petty ambitions, and incoherent demagogy, it was an instant hit with the public. Arguably the high point of Caragiale's career, it became one of the best-known works of its kind in Romanian literature. Maiorescu was pleased by its success, and believed that it was a sign of maturity in Romanian society, which, as he put it, was "starting to laugh" at the National Liberal rhetoric.

Ion Luca Caragiale was romantically involved with an unmarried young woman, Maria Constantinescu, who worked for the Bucharest Town Hall — in 1885, she gave birth to Mateiu, whom Caragiale recognized as his son.

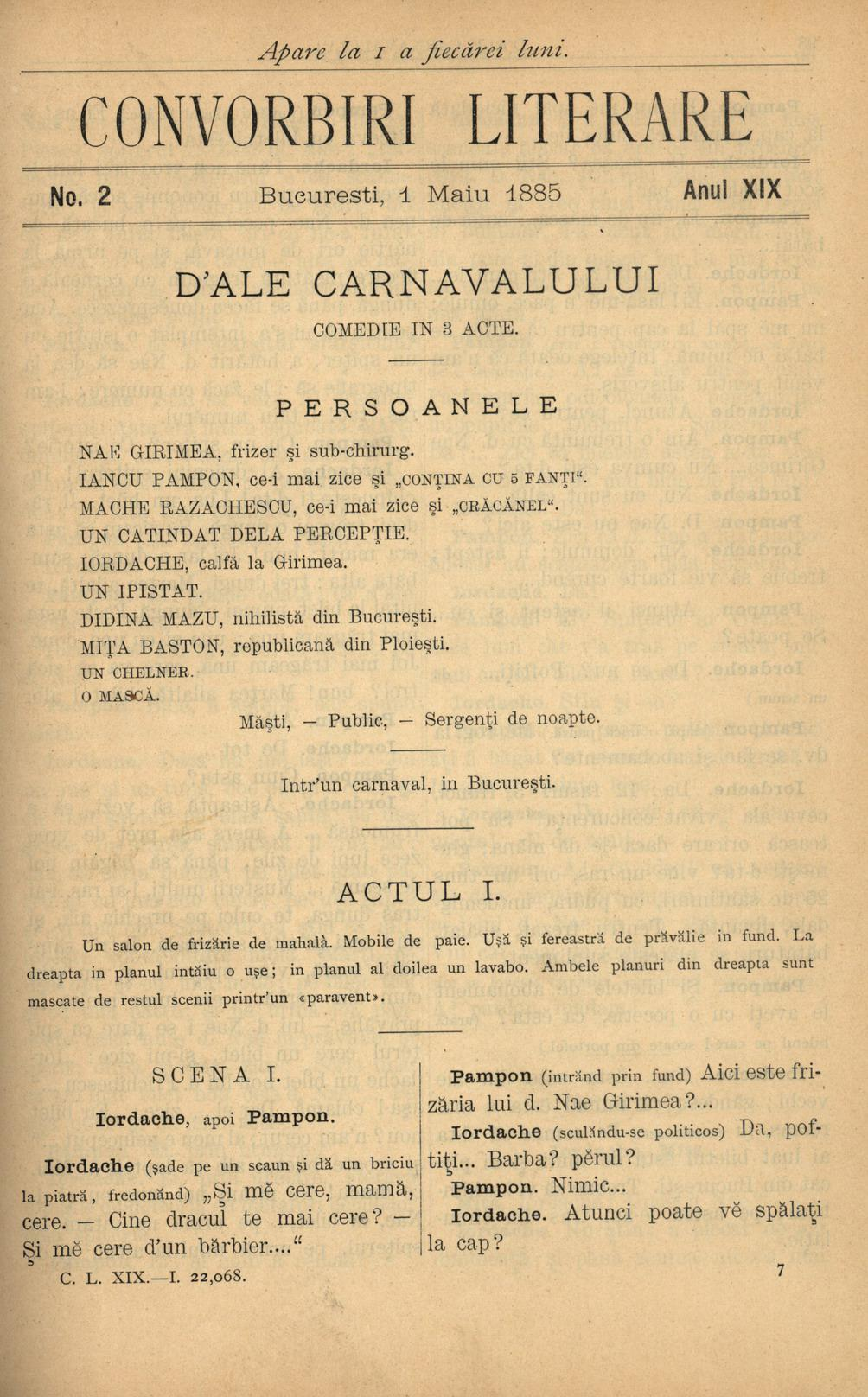
First printed version of D-ale carnavalului, as published in Convorbiri Literare (May 1885)

During the same year, Caragiale's D-ale carnavalului, a lighter satire of suburban morals and amorous misadventures, was received with booing and heckling by members of the public — critics deemed it "immoral", due to its frank depiction of adultery gone unpunished. The controversy saw Maiorescu taking his friend's side and publishing an essay highly critical of National Liberal cultural tenets (titled Comediile domnului Caragiale, it was to be reprinted in 1889, as a preface to Caragiale's collected plays). In it, the critic, who was influenced by the ideas of Arthur Schopenhauer, argued that Caragiale had not failed in uplifting the human spirit, precisely because he had risen above both didacticism and egotism (see Arthur Schopenhauer's aesthetics). In reference to accusations that the play was unpatriotic, Maiorescu answered:

"[...] the present-day poems with a political intent, the odes on solemn days, the theatrical compositions for dynastic glorifications are a simulacrum of art, and not the real art. Even patriotism, the most important sense for the citizen of a state in his actions as a citizen, has no place in art as an ad-hoc form of patriotism [...]. Is there a single lyric of French patriotism in Corneille? Is there any national spouting in Racine? Is there one in Molière? Is there one in Shakespeare? Is there one in Goethe?"

The article played an essential part in reconciling the dramatist to the general public, but also led to a polemic between Maiorescu and the philosopher Constantin Dobrogeanu-Gherea (a Marxist who claimed that Maiorescu was contradicting himself). Dobrogeanu-Gherea argued in favor of Caragiale's work, but considered D-ale carnavalului to be his weakest play.

=== Theater leadership and marriage ===
Despite his earlier conflicts with the National Liberals, Caragiale, who still faced problems in making a living, agreed to contribute pieces for the party press, and thus briefly associated with Voința Națională (a journal issued by historian and politician Alexandru Dimitrie Xenopol). Under the pen name Luca, he contributed two theater chronicles. In parallel, he taught classes at the privately run Sfântul Gheorghe High School in Bucharest. This episode of his career ended in 1888, when Maiorescu ascended to the office of Minister of Education in the Teodor Rosetti cabinet (formed by a group of Junimist Conservatives). Caragiale requested to be appointed Head of Theaters, which also implied leadership of the National Theater. Although Maiorescu was initially opposed, Caragiale eventually received the post. The ultimate decision was attributed to Romania's Queen Elisabeth having asked Maiorescu to reconsider, or, alternatively, to the support offered by the influential Junimist Petre P. Carp.

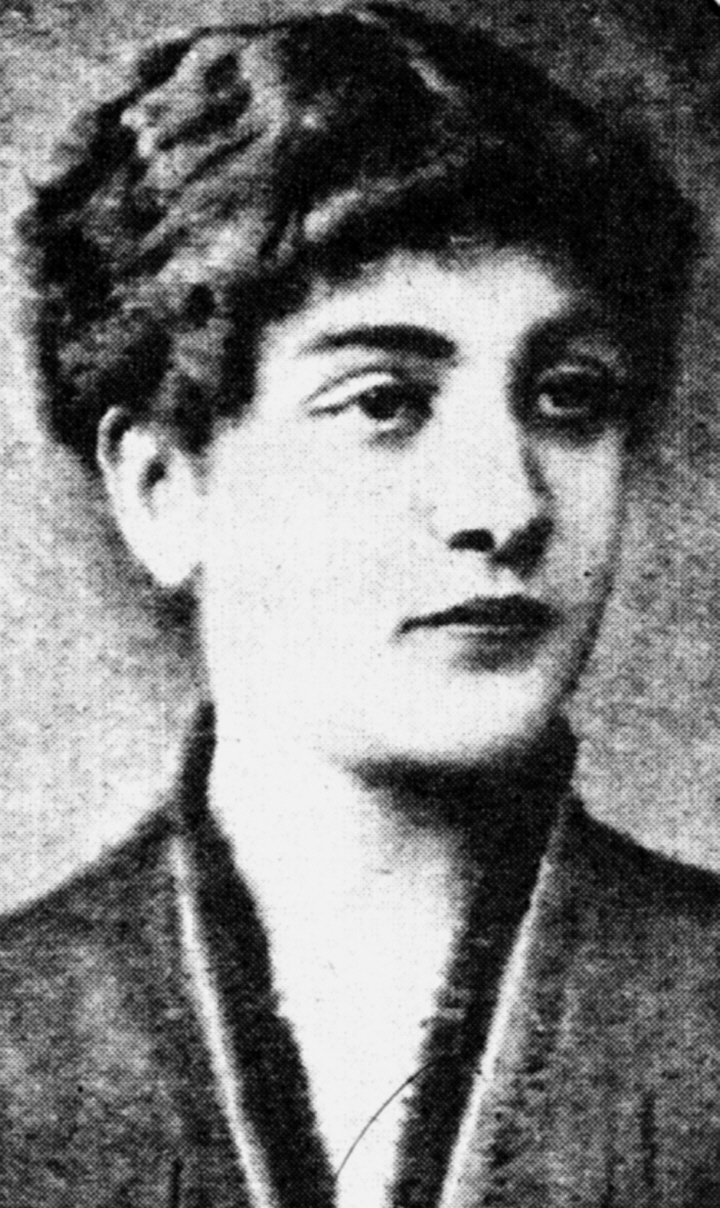
Alexandrina Burelly

The appointment caused some controversy at the time: Ion Luca Caragiale, unlike all his predecessors (the incumbent C.I. Stăncescu included), was both a professional in the field and a person of modest origins. As the National Liberals intensified their campaign against him, the dramatist drafted an open letter for the Bucharest press, outlining his intentions and explaining the circumstances of his appointment. In it, he attributed his own rise to the interest Junimea had taken in his work, while defending the literary society, which was, as he put it, "lost from the public eye at a time of political obscurity". Reviewing his own merits as a writer and manager, he elaborated and later put into practice a program for state-run theaters — according to Vianu, it signified "punctuality and rigor". He nonetheless resigned at the end of the season, and resumed his literary activities.

In January 1889, he married Alexandrina, the daughter of architect Gaetano Burelly. She was a member of the Bucharest elite, which served to improve Ion Luca Caragiale's social standing. They had two children of their own: Luca (known as Luky; born 1893) and Ecaterina (or Tușchi; born 1894; later married name: Logadi). Several years later, the Caragiales brought Mateiu into their home, and Ion Luca enrolled him at Anghel Demetrescu's Sfântul Gheorghe College.

=== Clash with the Academy ===
Early in 1890, at the same time as his volume of collected works, Caragiale published and staged his rural-themed tragedy Năpasta — both writings were presented for consideration to the Romanian Academy, in view of receiving its annual prize, the Ion Heliade Rădulescu Award. Caragiale's conflict with the National Liberals reached its peak, as two of their representatives inside the forum, historian Bogdan Petriceicu Hasdeu and future Premier Dimitrie Sturdza, reported unfavorably. Additional criticism was voiced by the poet Gheorghe Sion, who also defended the a work by Constantin Dobrogeanu-Gherea (itself up for review). When the Junimist Iacob Negruzzi defended his friend, Sturdza contrasted Caragiale's works with his own version of didacticism, claiming that it altogether lacked a moral and national quality.

Both Hasdeu and Sturdza hinted at the influence exercised over Caragiale by their adversary Maiorescu, and went on to compare the dramatist with foreign writers such as Mite Kremnitz and Joseph Brociner; the latter was Jewish. For the two liberal leaders, Kremnitz and Brociner, who had authored works critical of the Romanian establishment, were aiding to construct a negative image of the Romanian nation. Hasdeu insisted that Caragiale was himself creating problems for the country, while Sturza, showing himself more lenient in this respect, insisted that Caragiale's plays had failed to display a love for "the truth, the beautiful and the good". He stressed:

"Mr. Caragiale should learn how to respect his nation, and not mock it."

Sturdza's discourse contributed to the academy's negative vote (20 votes against and 3 in favor), and rose Caragiale's anger. In parallel, Dobrogeanu-Gherea's candidature for the prize was rejected with 16 votes against and 8 for. In 1897, writing for the Conservative paper Epoca, the writer lashed out at Sturdza and his partisans, claiming that they viewed all humorous talents as "unholy", "useless to the nation", and "downright perilous". Vianu noted that Caragiale's article directly aimed at Sturdza's reverence for Jacobinism, collectivism, and nationalism, which, in Caragiale's own words,

"manipulated the baggage of big words with which the phony liberal school has been filling empty heads for fifty years on end".

=== Split with Junimea ===
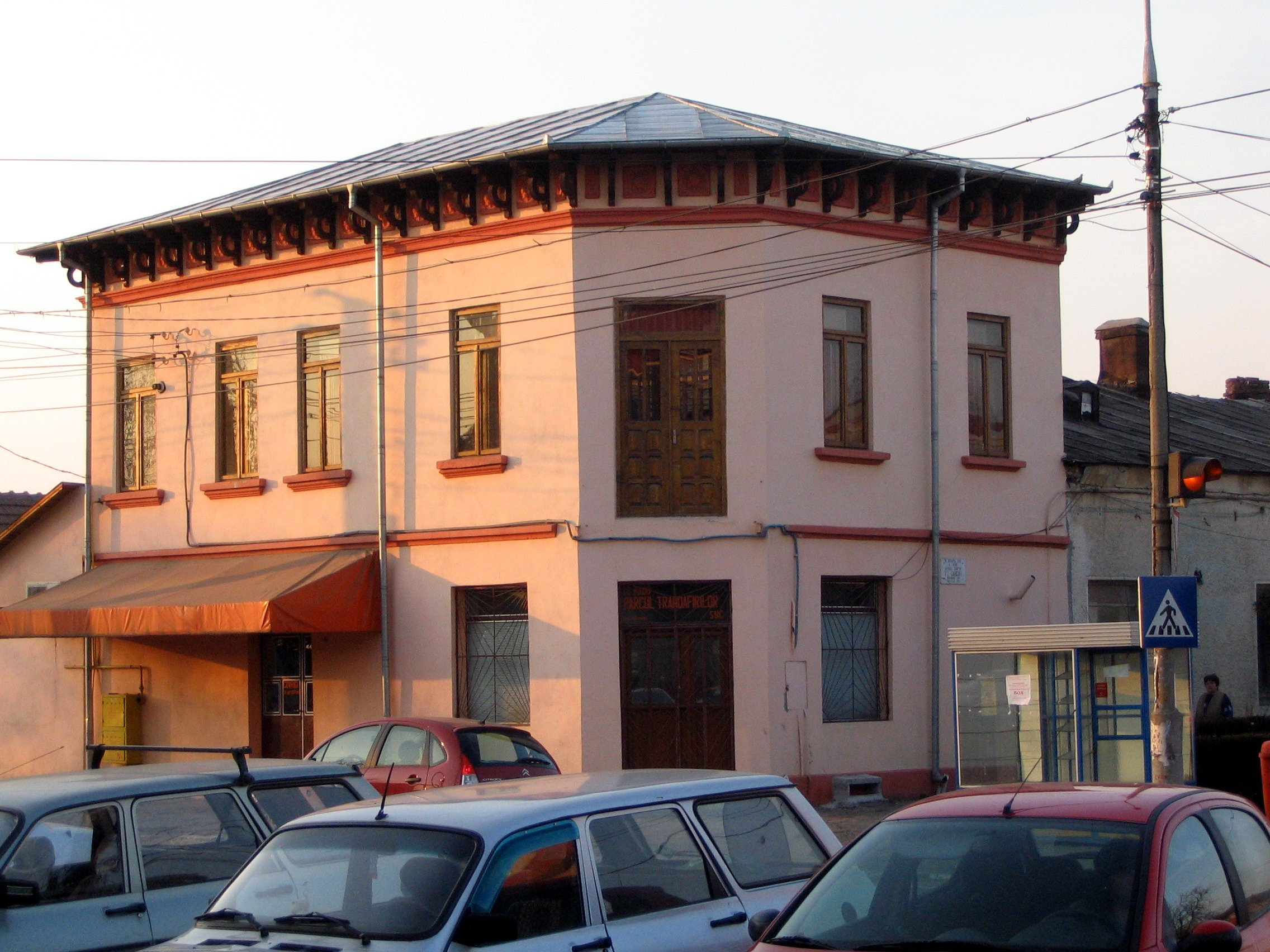
The building in Buzău, across the street from the city railway station, where Caragiale leased a restaurant in 1895

During the controversy, Caragiale published two memoirs of Eminescu—the poet had died in June 1889. One of them was titled În Nirvana ("Into Nirvana"), and notably expanded on the early years of their friendship and on one of Eminescu's earliest amorous disappointments. In an essay of the following year, he showed himself critical of a wave of Eminescu imitators, commenting: "A lot of reasonable people will walk the path and [...] of the people that know them only a few will raise their hats; whereas an insane person [...] will be followed by all the people. That is why the success of the [1890 Eminescu edition] has overcome all the editors' expectations". He also reprinted his recollections from the world of theater, alongside pieces originally published in Claponul and various new satirical pieces.

Although this attack owed much to Junimea's discourse, Caragiale had by then turned against Maiorescu, probably due to his perception that the society had failed to support his cause at the Academy. In May 1892, he used a public conference at the Romanian Athenaeum as a venue to make known his claims against the former Minister of Education and his associates, which caused a definitive rift between the two public figures. Caragiale also wrote Două note ("Two Notes"), an article accusing Maiorescu of having modified and censored some of Eminescu's poems, and of having exploited the poet for financial gain. Around that time, he ceased contributing to Convorbiri Literare.

Late in 1892, Caragiale published two volumes of prose, including his new novellas Păcat, O făclie de Paște and Om cu noroc. The following year, he began frequenting socialist circles as an outsider to the cause, and soon became good friends with the Imperial Russian-born Marxist thinker Constantin Dobrogeanu-Gherea. Financial constraints forced Caragiale to become an entrepreneur, and, in November of that year, opened a beer garden near Gabroveni Inn, in Bucharest's Lipscani area. He probably moved on soon after, and purchased a pub on a neighboring street. In a letter he wrote at the time, the writer showed that he was planning to move to Transylvania, and considered starting a career as a teacher.

In November 1893, as a gesture of goodwill towards his adversary, Alexandru Macedonski authored an article in Literatorul, in which he asked authorities if it was normal for a former Head of Theaters not to have a stable source of income—the intended recipient did not acknowledge this offer, and the Caragiale-Macedonski conflict escalated after he continued to attack the latter in the press. One year later, Caragiale leased the restaurant catering to the train station in Buzău (just like Dobrogeanu-Gherea had done in Ploiești). His successive businesses were all struggling, and Caragiale was often on the verge of bankruptcy. Although he invested time and work in the enterprise, and even affiliated with the International Association of Waiters for a short period, he eventually decided not to renew his contract upon the years' end. His period in Buzău was noted for its other results: in February 1895, the press reported that Caragiale had given a public lecture on "the causes of human stupidity".

=== Moftul Român and Vatra ===
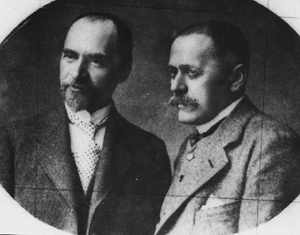
George Coșbuc and Ion Luca Caragiale

Together with the socialist activist Tony Bacalbașa and the illustrator Constantin Jiquidi, he established the satirical magazine Moftul Român, which ceased print after a few months, before being revived in 1901 and becoming an important venue for social criticism. The new publication's spirit was indebted to Junimist discourse. Its title, translatable as "the Romanian trifle" or "the Romanian nonsense", alluded to the cynicism and self-importance of the emerging modern Romanian society. According to Vianu, this was a theme first debated by Junimea's Theodor Rosetti. Moft! thus mimicked the common answer to any important or merely exacerbated problem, and Caragiale also used it to illustrate what he saw as a common national feature. In one of his early editorials for the magazine, he claimed that moft was to Romanians what spleen (melancholy) was to the English people, nihilism to the Russians, chauvinism to the Hungarians, and vendetta to the Italians.

In parallel, Cargiale resumed his contacts with Transylvanian intellectuals: with George Coșbuc and Ioan Slavici, he founded the magazine Vatra (1 January 1894), before withdrawing from its leadership. During his short stay, he printed an unsigned sketch story, Cum se înțeleg țăranii ("How Peasants Communicate"), which mockingly recorded a lengthy and redundant dialog between two villagers, as well as a portrait of the deceased politician Mihail Kogălniceanu, and a fairy tale inspired by the writings of Anton Pann. He also translated a novella authored by his friend, Queen Elisabeth, under the title Răzbunare ("Revenge")—he is known to have been annoyed by the longueurs of the piece, and struck out large portions of it to improve the flow.

During the same period, Caragiale had the initiative to publish short fragments he had translated from classical pieces, leaving readers to guess who their authors were—Vianu, citing the speculations made by other critics, presumed that these were writers admired by both Caragiale and his friend, schoolteacher Anghel Demetrescu (Thomas Carlyle, Alexis de Tocqueville, Thomas Babington Macaulay, François Guizot and Augustin Thierry). It was also then that he authored a piece on Prince Ferdinand, the heir apparent, who had fallen severely ill — it shows Caragiale to be a passionate defender of the Romanian monarchy, praying for Ferdinand's health. In 1898, he wrote a lengthy essay on the state of Romanian theater, in which he notably praised the actor Ion Brezeanu, who made his name through portrayals of Caragiale's characters, for, among others, his "sober and refined interpretation". Later that year, he published a new novella, În vreme de război, a fantasy set to the background of the Russo-Turkish War of 1877–1878.

=== Radical Party ===
In 1895, at the age of 43, Caragiale decided to join the Radical Party, led at the time by former Junimist George Panu; one year later, he began contributing to its mouthpiece, the newspaper Ziua. He was also briefly associated with the newspaper Sara, published in Iași. Despite this, Caragiale was again an associate of the National Liberals later the same year, when the Conservative cabinet of Lascăr Catargiu was replaced with one led by Dimitrie Sturdza. Articles he contributed to Gazeta Poporului, a National Liberal newspaper, were centered on new attacks against Junimea and were signed with the pseudonyms i and Ion. In mid-November 1895, Gazeta Poporului published an unsigned article which discussed the suicide of writer Alexandru Odobescu, investigating the mundane reasons behind it—the piece is generally attributed to Caragiale. The writer placed the blame for Odobescu's death on his much younger lover, Hortensia Racoviță, and hailed his wife, Sașa Odobescu, as a model of devoted womanhood.

This episode of his life coincided with a period when relations between Romania and Austria-Hungary were extremely tense. Three years before, ethnic Romanian leaders in Austro-Hungarian-ruled Transylvania had signed the Transylvanian Memorandum, which inflamed passions among the Hungarians and led the authors to be indicted. Conservative Party politicians in Romania had succeeded in negotiating an amnesty, but their policies were overturned by the National Liberals, who appealed to nationalist and irredentist sentiment.

Thus, Sturdza offered a measure of support to Eugen Brote, Tribuna editor and National Romanian Party activist. Brote, who fled Transylvania and planned to directly implicate the Romanian Kingdom into the conflict, attempted to replace the pro-Conservative leadership of the National Party with a selection of politicians favored by the National Liberals. As Sturdza came to lead the cabinet, both he and Brote retracted their previous statements, but again provoked the National Party by alleging that its leaders were the actual radicals. In harsh terms, Caragiale exposed the understanding Sturdza had with Brote. Soon after, he authored a short story about a con artist who traveled to the imagined Transylvanian town of Opidul-nou, posing as the nationalist Romanian writer Alexandru Vlahuță as a means to live off the local intelligentsia. In October 1897, he was outraged by news that Sturdza had given in to Austro-Hungarian demands, and that he had expelled Transylvanian nationalists from Romania: Caragiale held a speech in which he argued that Romanians living abroad were "indispensable" to the Romanian state.

=== Epoca ===
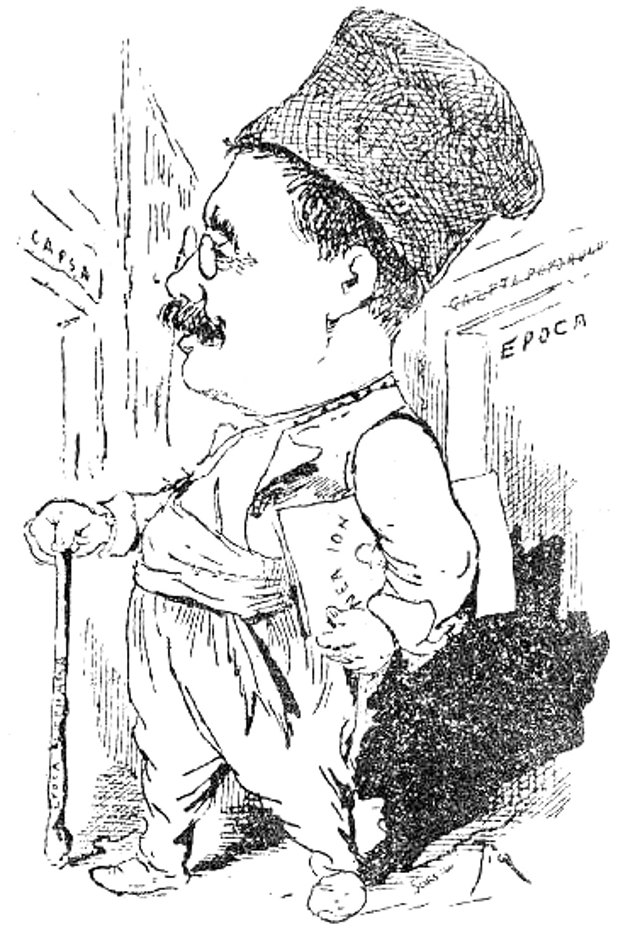
Caragiale as a traveler, parting with Epoca (1890s caricature by Constantin Jiquidi)

In 1895, the writer followed the Radical group into its unusual merger with the Conservative Party. This came at a time of unified opposition, when the Junimists themselves returned to their group of origin. Caragiale came to identify with the policies endorsed by a new group of Conservative leaders, Nicolae Filipescu and Alexandru Lahovari among them. He was upset when Lahovari died not too long after, and authored his obituary.

Caragiale also became a collaborator on Filipescu's journal Epoca and editor of its literary supplement. A chronicle he contributed at the time discussed the philosophical writings of Dobrogeanu-Gherea: while sympathetic to his conclusions, Caragiale made a clear statement that he was not interested in the socialist doctrine or any other ideology ("Any idea, opinion or system is absolutely irrelevant to me, in the most absolute sense"). He also published an article criticizing Dimitrie Sturdza; its title, O lichea (roughly: "A Scoundrel"), was reluctantly accepted by Epoca, and only after Caragiale claimed that it reflected the original meaning of the word lichea ("stain"), explaining that it referred to Sturdza's unusual persistence in politics.

When answering to one of Epoca's inquiries, he showed that he had yet again come to reevaluate Junimea, and found it to be an essential institution in Romanian culture. Nevertheless, he was distancing himself from the purest Junimist tenets, and took a favorable view of Romantic writers whom the society had criticized or ridiculed — among these, he indicated his personal rival Bogdan Petriceicu Hasdeu, whom he acknowledged to be among "the most remarkable figures of our literature", and Alexandru Odobescu. As editor of Epoca, he published works by Hasdeu alongside those of his other contemporaries and predecessors — Grigore Alexandrescu, Nicolae Filimon, Dinicu Golescu, Ion Heliade Rădulescu, Cilibi Moise, Costache Negruzzi, and Anton Pann. He also took a more sympathetic but still distant view of Maiorescu. At the time, he befriended the young poet Cincinat Pavelescu, and helped to promote his works in the press.

=== Universul ===
Around that time, Caragiale began collaborating with the formerly Junimist figure Mihail Dragomirescu, who enlisted his anonymous contributions to the magazine Convorbiri Critice. Again pressed by financial problems, he returned to a bureaucratic post—this time with the administration of government monopolies, and appointed by the Conservative cabinet of Gheorghe Grigore Cantacuzino in June 1899. In 1901, the position was suppressed due to cutbacks in budget spending. This coincided with Sturdza's third mandate as Premier, and further aggravated the conflict between the two figures.

At the same time, Caragiale was contributing to Luigi Cazzavillan's newly founded daily, Universul, where he was assigned the column "Notițe critice" ("Critical Notes"). This material formed the bulk of his collected short prose volume, Momente și schițe, and notably comprised satirical pieces ridiculing the Romanian press' reaction to the activities of Boris Sarafov, a Macedonian-Bulgarian revolutionary who had attempted to set up a base in Romania.

He continued to pursue a business career, and, in 1901, inaugurated his own company, Berăria cooperativă, which took over the Gambrinus pub in front of the National Theater. It soon became the site of a literary circle, which included, among others, Tony Bacalbașa and Ion Brezeanu, the satirist Dumitru Constantinescu-Teleormăneanu (known as Teleor), and the academic I. Suchianu. At the time, the Caragiales rented a house in Bucharest, near the present-day Bulevardul Magheru.

In early 1901, as Ion Luca Caragiale entered his 25th year in literature, his friends offered him a banquet at Gambrinus, where speeches were given by Barbu Ștefănescu Delavrancea and the Conservative politician Take Ionescu, and where a special single-issue magazine, Caragiale, was circulated among the guests. Hasdeu put aside his differences in opinion and sent in a congratulatory letter. In it, he deemed the dramatist "Romania's Molière". Nevertheless, on 23 March 1902, the National Liberal majority in the Romanian Academy, headed by Sturdza, refused to consider Momente și schițe for the Năsturel Herăscu Award — despite a favorable report from Dimitrie C. Ollănescu-Ascanio.

=== Caion scandal ===
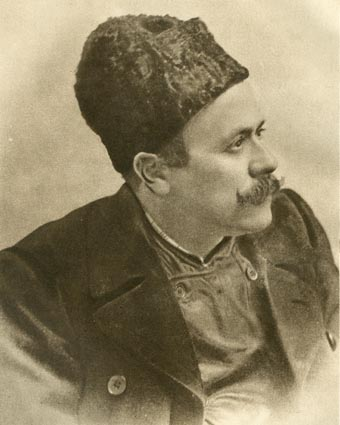
Caragiale in 1899

Soon after, Caragiale became involved in a major literary scandal. Constantin Al. Ionescu-Caion, a journalist and student whom Tudor Vianu described as "a real pathological character", issued a claim that, in his Năpasta, the Romanian dramatist had plagiarized the work of a Hungarian author, István Kemény. Caion expanded on this in articles published by Revista Literară, where he provided direct comparisons between the two texts. This was received with enthusiasm by Caragiale's old rival, Alexandru Macedonski, who publicized the controversy through one of his journals, Forța Morală. Initially amazed by the similarity between the two texts, Caragiale carried out his own investigations, and, in the end, discovered that neither the writing nor Kemény had ever existed. Employing Ștefănescu Delavrancea as his lawyer, he brought Caion to trial: a court sentenced Caion for calumny, but he was acquitted after an appeal in June 1902. Several commentators believe that this was owed to a strong National Liberal presence among members of the jury. During the retrial, Caion retracted all his previous claims, and instead argued that Năpasta plagiarized Leo Tolstoy's The Power of Darkness.

Macedonski supported the lost cause until the very end, and refused to distance himself from Caion even as the latter admitted to the court that he had invented the story. His magazine also accused Caragiale of having copied Victorien Sardou's Rabagas for his O scrisoare pierdută, as well as Henri Chivot and Alfred Duru's Le Carnaval d'un Merle Blanc in D-ale carnavalului. In one memorable incident of 14 February 1902, while he was hosting a literary festivity at the Bucharest Athenaeum, Macedonski was heckled and responded by blowing a whistle. Forța Morală was shut down soon after this episode. In parallel, the National Theater offered Caragiale a degree of satisfaction, when it decided to showcase Rabagas, leaving the public to see that it was only remotely similar to his play.

In the wake of the scandal, Caragiale attempted to resume contacts with Maiorescu, and visited him several times. His former mentor was reticent, and finally rejected the offer for reconciliation – writing in his diary, he defined Caragiale's attempts as "apple-polishings" and paradări ("affectations").

=== Move to Berlin ===
Having gained access to the Momulo Cardini inheritance, Caragiale became a rather wealthy man. According to Șerban Cioculescu, the writer soon lost most of the funds earned, transferring them to Mateiu Caragiale and his mother, but was again made rich by the death of his sister Lenci in autumn 1905—she left him the administrator of 160,000 lei. The latter event caused tensions between Mateiu and his father—Caragiale-son believed that he had been cheated out of the inheritance, and was angered by Ion Luca's decision to stop subsidizing him after he failed to complete his studies.

He was by then enchanted with the idea of moving into a Western or Central European country, where he hoped to lead a more comfortable life and be closer to the centers of culture. He was especially interested in gaining easier access to the major stages for classical music, as a means to satisfy his desire for quality in that field (he had by then come to adore the compositions of Ludwig van Beethoven). According to Tudor Vianu, Caragiale was also showing signs that he was about to enter a vaguely misanthropic phase of his life.

In 1903–1904, the Caragiales traveled through various European countries, while the dramatist again considered establishing his residence in Transylvania. They eventually moved to Berlin, the Imperial German capital, settling down in spring 1905. The choice was considered unusual, since the writer knew only some basic German expressions. This has led some commentators to speculate that the move was politically motivated. Mihail Dragomirescu believed that Caragiale was living at the expense of the German state. Cioculescu rejected this assessment, arguing that it relied on hearsay and pointing out that the chronological order provided by Dragomirescu was inaccurate. In 1992, historian Georgeta Ene proposed that Caragiale was acting as a spy for Romania in Germany.

The family lived in an apartment in Wilmersdorf and later at a villa in Schöneberg. Paraphrasing a Romanian proverb which speaks of "the black bread of exile", the dramatist jokingly referred to his relocation as "the white loaf" (franzela albă a surghiunului). He did not however isolate himself completely, becoming very close to the group of Romanian students attending the University of Berlin and to other young people: among them were poet and essayist Panait Cerna, sociologist Dimitrie Gusti, musician Florica Musicescu, and Constantin Dobrogeanu-Gherea's son-in-law, the literary critic Paul Zarifopol. Caragiale was also close to the linguist Gustav Weigand. He frequently traveled to Leipzig, where he would meet with Zarifopol, as well as vacationing in Travemünde. In 1906, together with Zarifopol, he visited Beethoven's house in Bonn. He was close to the dramatist Ronetti Roman, and, in 1908, confessed that he was devastated by news of his death.

Caragiale was also visited by Barbu Ștefănescu Delavrancea, who, as a Francophile, vehemently rejected the aesthetics of Berlin in their conversations. Delavrancea was accompanied by his daughter, Cella, a celebrated pianist.

He also traveled back into Romania for intervals—when in Iași, he associated with the maverick Conservative Alexandru Bădărău and his journal Opinia. He had closely followed Bădărău's career up to that point, and, in July 1906, authored an epigram on his ousting from the Gheorghe Grigore Cantacuzino Conservative cabinet—comparing Bădărău to Jonah and the Conservatives to a great fish that spat him out. A poem he published during the same year ridicules King Carol I on the occasion of his fortieth year in power, while parodying the style of republican poet N. T. Orășanu; without making direct references to the monarch, it features the lyrics Ca rol fu mare, mititelul ("Taking in view his role, he was grand, the little one"), with "ca" and "rol" spelling out his name (and thus allowing the poem to read "Carol was grand, the little one"). He continued to publish various works in several other newspapers and magazines, including various Tranylvanian papers and the Iași-based Viața Românească.

His subsequent work comprised mostly correspondence with other literary figures, such as Dobrogeanu-Gherea, Mihail Dragomirescu, Alceu Urechia, and Zarifopol. He was also in touch with psychologist and philosopher Constantin Rădulescu-Motru. At the time, Caragiale planned to start work on Titircă, Sotirescu et C-ie, meaning to combine the characters of his two most successful comedies (O noapte furtunoasă and O scrisoare pierdută) into one play—this was never accomplished.

=== 1907 ===
In 1907, Caragiale was shaken by the outbreak and violent repression of the Romanian Peasants' Revolt, and decided to write a lengthy essay, in which he condemned the agrarian policies of both National Liberal and Conservative governments from a patriotic perspective. According to Vianu, the resulting 1907, din primăvară până în toamnă ("1907, From Spring to Autumn") was, alongside earlier essays by Eminescu and Maiorescu, the most important works of social analysis to be written by that generation.

The essay, written in harsh tones, listed what Caragiale saw as the major social problems tolerated by Romanian administrations: he discussed the landowning class, successor to the boyars, having maintained as much possible from the legacy of serfdom; he noted that, while the commerce was dominated by foreigners, the administration was gripped by a no longer aristocratic oligarchy and its far-reaching political machine. As several commentators noted, many of the topics brought up by Caragiale built on the critical overview adopted by Junimea. To the social and political problems, the text offered a monarchist solution—Caragiale expected Carol I to carry out a coup d'état against the Romanian political establishment, replacing the Constitution of 1866, which left some room for privilege through the census suffrage, with a more democratic one.

1907, din primăvară până în toamnă, first published in German under the pseudonym Ein rumänische Patriot ("A Romanian patriot"), was originally hosted by the Vienna-based newspaper Die Zeit. The translation had been completed by his friend Mite Kremnitz. In its original, the work was later printed under Caragiale's signature by the left-wing Romanian journal Adevărul. The author had agreed to make himself known after Die Zeit reached Romania and had caused the local press to wonder who had condemned the system in such harsh words.

The brochure attracted instantaneous attention in his native country, and its success was notable: it sold around 13,000 copies. There were notable differences between the two versions, which were the result of Caragiale's answer to criticism and suggestions from Christian Rakovsky, a prominent internationalist socialist who had been expelled from Romania early in the year. Caragiale elaborated on some of the essay's themes in a series of fables he published soon after.

This chain of events prompted Barbu Ștefănescu Delavrancea to offer him a position in the Conservative Party, as a means to reform the system from within. Caragiale rejected the offer: by then, he had grown disillusioned with the traditional political groupings, and had decided to sever all his links with them. Instead, in 1908, he joined the Conservative-Democratic Party, a rising force of the entrepreneurial middle class, led by Take Ionescu. He briefly returned to Romania several times after 1908, campaigning in favor of the Ionescu and being himself proposed for a seat in the Chamber of Deputies (before the Conservative-Democrats decided another person was more suited for the position). His involvement in politics engendered a collateral conflict with his son Mateiu, after the latter expressed a wish to become part of the administration (a project ridiculed by Caragiale-father).

In December 1907, after Opinia became a mouthpiece of Ionescu's party, Caragiale received news that its headquarters had been vandalized by A. C. Cuza and his nationalist supporters (who were students at the University of Iași). Just days after, when Cuza's group offered to host a Caragiale festival, he refused to participate, citing his respect for the freedom of the press. It was also during the period that he published his Din carnetul unui vechi sufleur, grouping short pieces about cultural figures such as Iorgu Caragiale, Pantazi Ghica, and Matei Millo.

=== Final years ===
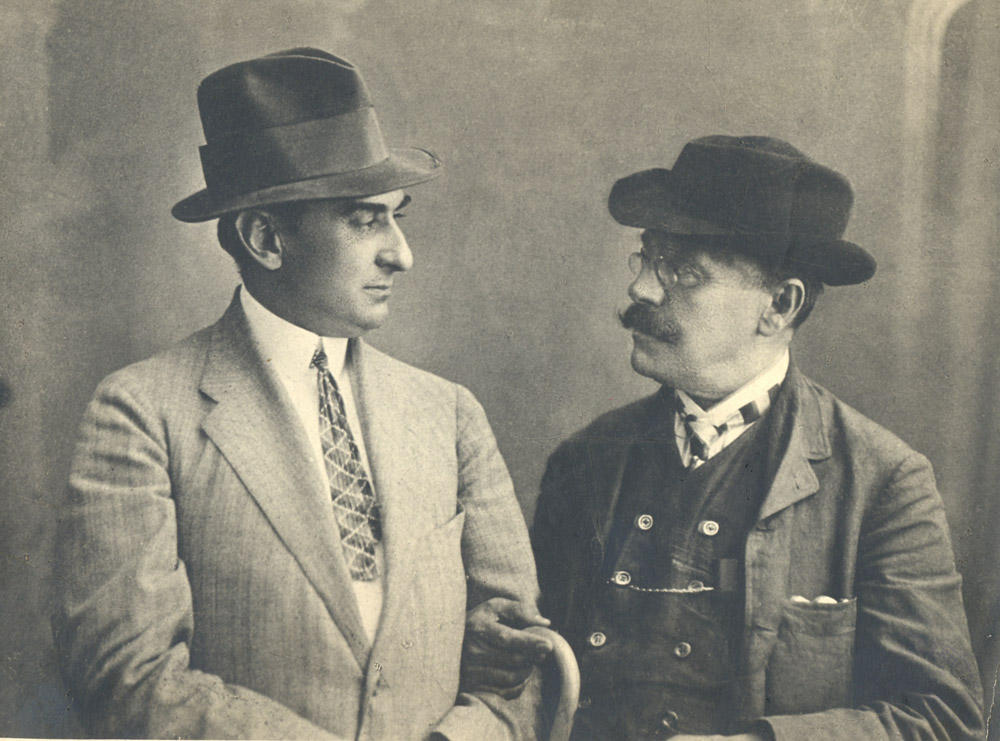
Alexandru Davila and Ion Luca Caragiale

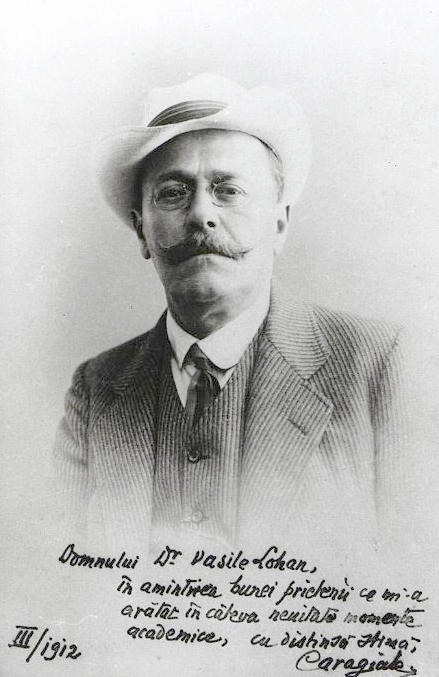
Ion Luca Caragiale c. 1912

Beginning in 1909, Caragiale resumed his contributions to Universul. The same year, his fantasy piece Kir Ianulea, which explored the history of Bucharest during the early 19th century and the late stages of the Phanariote period, was published by Viața Românească. The novella partly built on Belfagor arcidiavolo, by Renaissance author Niccolò Machiavelli, and was occasionally classified as an example of historical fiction. Similar stories use themes from the One Thousand and One Nights (Abu-Hasan) and popular anecdotes (Pastramă trufanda). Another work of the time was Calul dracului, a rural-themed account of demonic temptation, which Vianu called "one of the most perfect short stories to have been written in Romanian language".

His last collection of writings, titled Schițe nouă ("New Sketches") saw print in 1910. During that period, after giving endorsement to a project outlined by his fellow dramatist Alexandru Davila, he aided in the creation of a new privately run Bucharest theater, and recorded its inauguration in his reportage Începem ("We Begin").

By that time, Ion Luca Caragiale became remarkably close to a new generation of ethnic Romanian intellectuals in Austria-Hungary. In 1909, he recalled the union of the two Danubian Principalities under Alexander John Cuza, and predicted the union of Transylvania with Romania. He visited Budapest to meet with Transylvanian students at the local university, and was the subject of a PhD thesis authored by Horia Petra-Petrescu (which was also the first monograph on his work). He decided to support the poet and activist Octavian Goga, who, after questioning ethnic policies in Transleithania, had been jailed by Hungarian authorities—writing for Universul, Caragiale stressed that such persecutions carried the risk of escalating tensions in the region. Later, he visited Goga in Szeged, where he was serving time in jail.

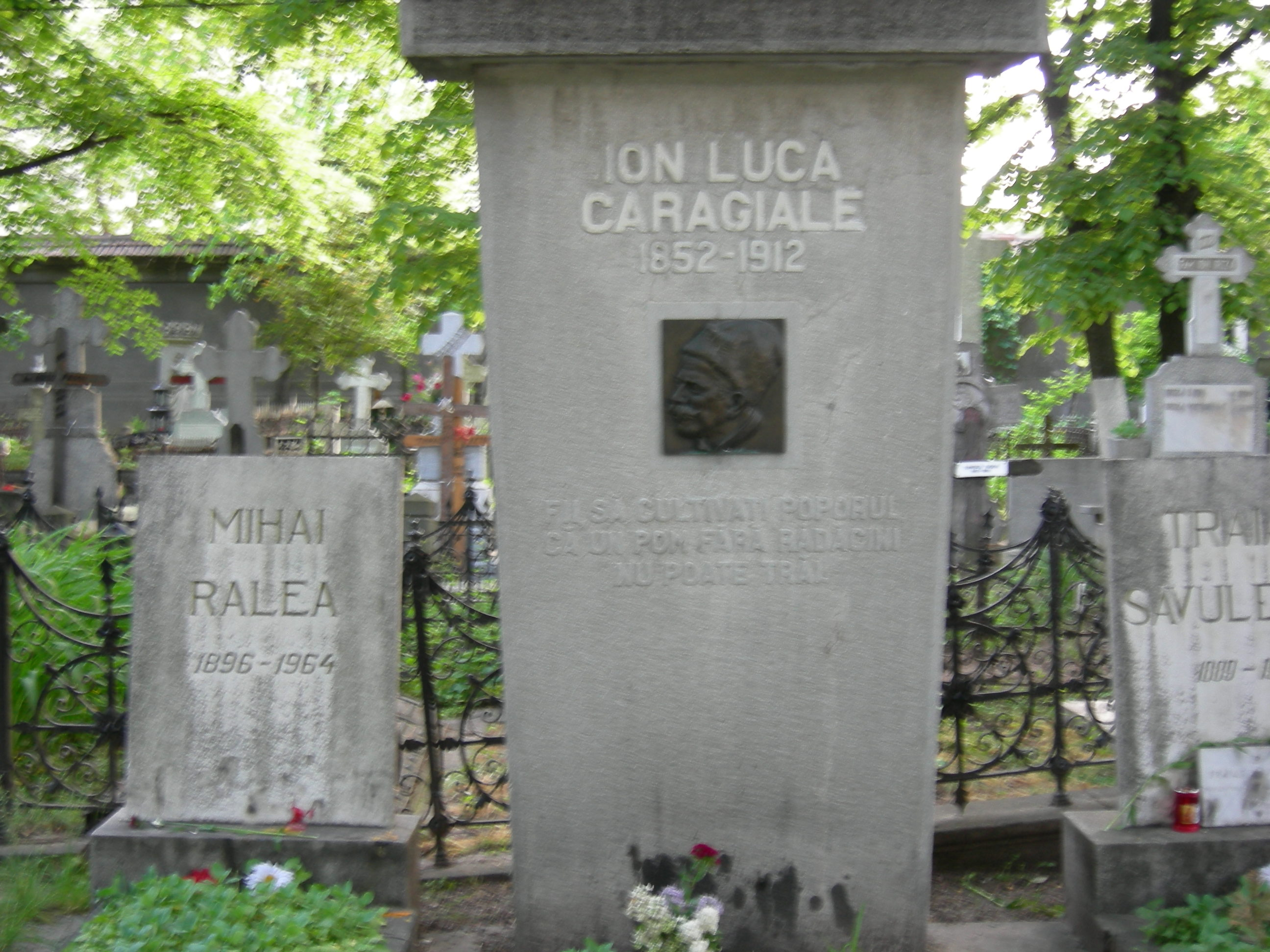
Caragiale's grave in the Bellu cemetery (flanked by those of Mihai Ralea and Traian Săvulescu)

Caragiale also contributed to the Arad-based journal Românul, becoming friends with other Romanian activists—Aurel Popovici, Alexandru Vaida-Voevod and Vasile Goldiș. His articles expressed support for the National Romanian Party, calling for its adversaries at Tribuna to abandon their dissident politics. In August 1911, he was present in Blaj, where the cultural association ASTRA was celebrating its 50th year. Caragiale also witnessed one of the first aviation flights, that of the Romanian Transylvanian pioneer Aurel Vlaicu. In January 1912, as he turned 60, Caragiale declined taking part in the formal celebration organized by Emil Gârleanu's Romanian Writers' Society. Caragiale had previously rejected Constantin Rădulescu-Motru's offer to carry out a public subscription in his favor, arguing that he could not accept such financial gains.

He died suddenly at his home in Berlin, very soon after returning from his trip. The cause of death was indicated as myocardial infarction. His son Luca recounted that, on that very night, Caragiale-father was rereading William Shakespeare's Macbeth, which he found to be a moving narrative.

Caragiale's body was transported to Bucharest in a freight train, which lost its way on the tracks and arrived with a major delay. He was eventually buried in Bellu cemetery on 22 November 1912. His longtime rival Alexandru Macedonski was saddened by the news of his death, and, in a letter to Adevărul, argued that he preferred Caragiale's humor to that of the American Mark Twain, stressing that "[we] attacked each other often because we loved each other a lot."

== Style and cultural tenets ==
According to Tudor Vianu, Caragiale's writings signify "the highest expression" of Romanian theatre, mirroring and complimenting the contribution Mihai Eminescu had to Romanian-language poetry. Vianu nonetheless pointed out the immense difference in style and approach between the Eminescu and Caragiale, noting that, to Eminescu's metaphysical interests and "Romantic genius", the dramatist opposed his "great classical and realist endowment, a social, voluble and epicurean nature".

Critics and historians place Caragiale's style midway between the delayed Classicism of 19th century Romanian literature and Realism (with its fin de siècle development, Naturalism). The writer, who abided by the classical unities, rejected Romantic tenets, and, as early as the 1870s, opposed the lyricism present in the dramas of Victor Hugo and Friedrich Schiller. Neoclassicism in his works is further enhanced in his drama and comedies by his adherence to Eugène Scribe's principles (see Well-made play). Paul Zarifopol argued that, for most of his life, Caragiale, the opponent of didacticism, advocated Maiorescu's principles of art for art's sake. He often sketched out alternative endings to his stories, and selected the ones he felt came most natural. Nevertheless, Zarifopol also noted that, late in his life, the writer contemplated adding a didactic message to one of his writings, which was to remain unfinished.

His role in the Romanian context was likened to those of Honoré de Balzac in France, Charles Dickens in the United Kingdom, and Nikolai Gogol in the Russian Empire. Literary critic Pompiliu Constantinescu credited Caragiale's sense of irony with having corrected the tendencies of his day, and, through this, with helping create an urban literature. Caragiale's interest in Realism was however denied by some of his Junimist advocates, who attempted to link his entire work with Maiorescu's guidelines: on the basis of Schopenhauerian aesthetics, critic Mihail Dragomirescu postulated that his humor was pure, and did not draw on any special circumstance or context.

Through many of his traits, Caragiale was connected to a Balkan environment of virtually permanent human contact, with its humor condensed in anecdotes, mimicry, and witty comebacks. Zarifopol quoted him saying that he admired the traditional forms of entertainment, and that he admired the soitarìi ("buffoons").

Largely reflecting his primordial study of dramaturgy, Caragiale's literature is indebted to dialog, as well as, in rarer cases, to internal monologue and free indirect speech (the favorite technique of Naturalists). Language takes the central role in his work, often compensating for the lack of detail. To this was added his tendency to reduce texts to their essence—he shortened down not only his own text, but also his occasional translations of stories by Queen Elisabeth and even Miguel de Cervantes or Edgar Allan Poe. At times, he added a lyrical, meditative or autobiographical, perspective to his works: this trait was especially obvious in his later fantasy works (Kir Ianulea and Calul dracului among them), all marked by Neoromantic inspiration. Zarifopol claimed that, although Caragiale often rejected the tendency of other writers to capitalize on picturesque images, he often used them in his own writings.

Caragiale arguably won as much acclaim for his rigorous approach to playwriting as for his accomplished style. With Alexandru Vlahuță, George Coșbuc and others, he belonged to the first generation of Romanian authors to take a noted interest in imposing professionalism. He was specific about this requirement—on one occasion, he used sarcasm to overturn a common misconception, saying: "Literature is an art that needs not be learned; whoever knows how to turn letters into syllables and the latter into words has had sufficient preparation to engage in literature." Commenting on this, Vianu stressed: "[...] even under the appearance of ease, [Caragiale] lets us catch sight of the severe law of his art" (adding elsewhere that "[Caragiale] was a scrupulous and tormented artist").

Caragiale compared writers who could not dissimulate their intent and generate a good story with "a cross-eyed who tells you which way to go: one doesn't known if he is to go down the road he points to, or down the road he is looking at". Speaking in the late 1890s, he also likened writing for the stage with architecture:

"In truth, just as much as the architect's plan is not yet the final accomplishment of his intent—that is to say, the monument—but only its conventional recording [...], so too is the dramaturg's writing not yet the accomplishment of his intent — that is to say, the comedy — but the conventional recording, to which will be added the personal elements, in order to depict a development of human circumstances and deeds. In short: just as an architect's plan bears little resemblance to a painting, so does drama bear little resemblance to a poem."

== Political and social vision ==
=== Liberalism and republicanism ===
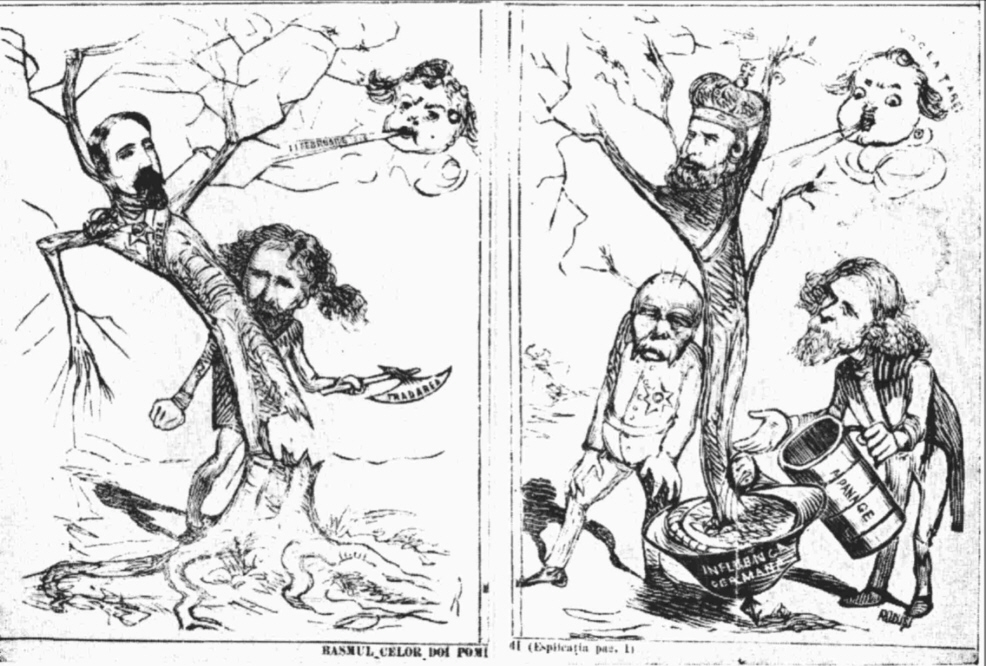
Anti-dynasty cartoon, published in Ghimpele in 1872, and illustrating the differences of opinion inside the liberal camp. Left panel: Alexander John Cuza betrayed by Ion Brătianu; right panel: Carol I, supported by Otto von Bismarck and Brătianu, feeding off of German influence and economic privilege

His interest in first-hand investigation of the human nature was accompanied, at least after he reached maturity, by a distaste for generous and universalist theories. Caragiale viewed their impact on Romanian society with a critical eye. Like Junimea, he was amused by the cultural legacy of 1848 Wallachian revolutionaries, and by its image in National Liberal discourse. Nevertheless, he claimed that there was a clear difference between the first generation of liberal activists—Ion Câmpineanu, Ion Heliade Rădulescu, and Nicolae Bălcescu—and the new liberal establishment, which, as he believed, had come to cultivate hypocrisy, demagogy, and political corruption. He exemplified the latter group by citing some of its prominent members: Pantazi Ghica and Nicolae Misail. At one point, he argued that, had they not died young, the leaders of 1848 could have found themselves best represented by the Conservatives. He recorded the way in which National Liberal politicians claimed to take inspiration from the revolt, and pointed out that the 1848 slogans had become rallying calls for the most banal causes.

His almost lifelong critique of the liberal current, marked by his conflicts with Dimitrie Sturdza and Bogdan Petriceicu Hasdeu, was partly inspired by the Junimea guidelines — in line with the Junimists, Caragiale perceived liberals as agents of Populism, popular Romanticism, and Idealism, as tenets prevalent in the literature of his day. For Caragiale, the resulting liberal-inspired literary works were spanac ("spinach"). The writer thus identified late 19th-century Romanian liberalism "empty talk", and his attacks on demagogy partly mirrored Maiorescu's views about the National Liberals' "inebriation with words".

Caragiale centered some of his first attacks on the "Reds" and their leader C. A. Rosetti, in whose republicanism and inflammatory rhetoric he saw the main threat to Romanian society. The writer believed that, ever since having ousted Alexander John Cuza from his throne, both Rosetti and Ion Brătianu were using their republican basis as an asset, inciting to rebellion only when their demands were not met. He frequently ridiculed the cult with which Rosetti surrounded figures of international republicanism, such as Giuseppe Garibaldi and Léon Gambetta, and indicated that the National Liberal public had very vague and impractical notions of what a republican state actually implied.

The republican agitation is no longer emphasized in Caragiale's later works, as republicanism slowly faded out of the mainstream liberal discourse. Noting this, several critics believe that, in his O scrisoare pierdută, which depicts the battle between two unnamed political camps, the dramatist alluded to the conflict between Brătianu's moderates and Rosetti's extremists (as indicated by the fact that all the main characters attend the same rallies). This view was disputed by Zarifopol, who argued that the more pragmatic grouping stands for the Conservatives, and the demagogic one for the National Liberals as a whole.

=== Nationalism ===
Ion Luca Caragiale was a vocal critic of antisemitism, which was mostly represented by the National Liberals and A. C. Cuza's emerging movement. At a time when the Jewish community was denied emancipation, he advocated its full integration into Romanian society, calling for civil rights to be extended to all residents of Romania. Around 1907, he tried his hand at writing a legislative proposal, according to which the Romanian state was to extend citizenship all resident stateless persons who did not enjoy foreign protection—in its manuscript form, this document was kept by his friend Dimitrie Gusti. According to Garabet Ibrăileanu, his rejection of antisemitic views was owed either to his failure to relate with the middle class and its anti-Jewish stances, or to his "powerful intelligence", which contrasted with the "instinctual, almost zoological nature" of the antisemitic discourse.

His criticism of both the nationalist discourse and liberal-inspired education generated subjects for several of his shorter satirical writings. Caragiale thus authored a mock-pamphlet advertising the program of a new cultural society, Românii Verzi (the "Green Romanians"), who took its racialist proposals to the point of arguing that "[...] a nation must always fear other nations". Like Junimea, he was entirely opposed to the group of August Treboniu Laurian and other Transylvanian intellectuals, who attempted to reform the Romanian language by introducing new forms of speech and writing that aimed to return it closer to its Latin roots. In his stories, Caragiale created the teacher Marius Chicoș Rostogan, a caricature of both the liberal educators and the Transylvanian "Latinists". While in Berlin, the writer also persiflaged some of Vasile Alecsandri's liberal and patriotic writings—he completed Alecsandri's nationalist poem Tricolorul with sarcastic verses that were meant to enhance its xenophobic feel (showing the Romanians ready to do battle against all their perceived enemies in Eastern Europe).

Nevertheless, various authors believe that a young Caragiale did indeed support nationalist liberal policies, and presume that he was behind a series of anti-Jewish columns, published by Voința Națională during the early 1880s. This was for long disputed: rabbi and literary historian Moses Gaster attributed the pieces to Nicolae Xenopol, while researcher Șerban Cioculescu, who originally doubted them, eventually agreed that they formed an integral part of Caragiale's work.

=== Conservatism and traditionalism ===
Caragiale (left) and Alexandru Vlahuță

In some of his early articles, and again as he distanced himself from Junimea, the writer showed himself to be a vocal critic of the Conservative doctrine and its Junimist representatives. This is especially evident in his 1907 essay and in some of his stories. Caragiale claimed that both Titu Maiorescu and Petre P. Carp were "boyars" who prioritized the interest of their social class (which was by then nonetheless defunct, as traditional privilege had been formally abolished a generation earlier). Cioculescu attributed this to an "inferiority complex" Caragiale felt in respect to his former patrons.

Despite his brief association with the mainstream Conservatives, Caragiale was probably never their partisan, and only hoped that the party could open the way for the reforms advertised by George Panu and Alexandru Lahovari. When disappointed with their failure to promote change, he moved on to support Take Ionescu and his dissident grouping. Uniquely among students of Caragiale's work, George Călinescu argued that the writer's main interest was not in criticizing the liberals, but actually in an overall rejection of the most embedded Junimist tenets, which, in Călinescu's view, had engendered "a lack of faith in the country's own powers". Paul Zarifopol believed that several of his Momente și schițe characters, including the effeminate high life chronicler Edgar Bostandaki, are caricatures of the Conservatives.

Caragiale contrasted the other major writers of his generation, including his friends Mihai Eminescu, Ioan Slavici, Barbu Ștefănescu Delavrancea, and Sămănătorul journal founder Alexandru Vlahuță, all of whom were advocating a return to the rural sphere and peasant traditionalism. In Moftul Român, he parodied the archaisms favored by Ștefănescu Delavrancea; during his final years, he also questioned the aesthetic value of Ștefănescu Delavrancea's medieval-themed play Apus de soare. Prominent nationalists and traditionalists tended to be reserved in their assessment of Caragiale's literary contributions—they include his friend Eminescu and historian Nicolae Iorga.

Nonetheless, Ion Luca Caragiale was, according to Zarifopol, a passionate advocate of tradition in front of innovation, and "a defender of the well-established truths". Tudor Vianu also evidenced that Caragiale treasured his Orthodox identity, frequently appealing to God and the saints in both his private life and his writings. According to Ioan Slavici, Caragiale defined himself as "a right-believing Christian", and disagreed with Eminescu on the nature of religion (at a time when the poet was a passionate student of Buddhism). Cioculescu called this trait "primitive religiosity". The writer is also known to have convinced that luck and destiny manifested themselves in life, and his Cănuță om sucit, a short story about a proverbially unlucky fellow, is thought to have referred to its author. His superstitions were accompanied by a series of phobias, particularly pyrophobia and nosophobia.

=== Caragiale and the modernists ===
Ion Luca Caragiale was mostly critical of literary experiments and the newer stages of Modernism. On this basis, he persistently ridiculed Alexandru Macedonski's style, especially after the latter adopted Symbolism. Much of his own poetry, especially pieces published in Moftul Român after 1901, parodied the Romanian Symbolist clubs and the Parnassianism of Macedonski's Literatorul (among the best-known of these targets was poet Cincinat Pavelescu, who was coeditor at Literatorul).

As editor of Epoca's literary supplement, Caragiale refused to publish a descriptive poem by the young Gala Galaction, claiming that it was not poetry (when Nicolae Filipescu asked him to reconsider, he threatened to quit). Late in his life, he reserved explicit criticism for the new generation of Symbolists, whose work, he argued, belonged to "the church" of Belgian poet Maurice Maeterlinck. Zarifopol also noted that, for as long as he lived, the writer derided the innovative works of Henrik Ibsen and August Strindberg, but pointed out that Caragiale had never actually read or seen their plays.

Nevertheless, Caragiale was not entirely opposed to newer trends in poetry and art. Literary critic Matei Călinescu believes that he genuinely admired În orașul cu trei sute de biserici ("In the City with Three Hundred Churches"), a free verse poem by the Symbolist Ion Minulescu. This work is believed to have inspired a 1908 parody by Caragiale, in which the writer proclaimed his support for Take Ionescu. According to poet and essayist Tudor Arghezi, Caragiale also admired the works of Ștefan Luchian, a Postimpressionist whose paintings were often exhibited in Bucharest galleries.

=== Caragiale and the Left ===
Moving toward the Left during the final decades of his life, the writer maintained connection with the socialists, but was nonetheless ambivalent to their goals. As Cioculescu noted, he welcomed the Bucharest celebration of May Day in one of his Moftul Român pieces, and probably agreed to lecture for the Workers' Club in the capital. Some of his writings were hosted by the socialist journal România Muncitoare. According to Garabet Ibrăileanu, himself a socialist at the time, "sometime after 1890, Caragiale briefly flirted with socialism."

However, over the same period, Caragiale ridiculed several socialist militants, referring to one of their leaders with the derisive nickname Edgard Spanachidi (itself a derivative of "spinach"). Instead, his loose association with George Panu signified a return to radicalism, and saw him campaigning in favor of universal suffrage and a complete land reform—this clashed with the views he had expressed earlier in life, and Caragiale was careful not to let it seem that he had returned to the "Red" liberalism of his youth.

In one of his articles, Ion Luca Caragiale commented with irony on the Marxist views of his friend Constantin Dobrogeanu-Gherea: he compared the latter's way of dining on a leg of veal, laboriously carving it into sections, to his philosophical approach. Caragiale thus noted that philosophical skepticism was equivalent to stripping the bone of its flesh piece by piece, and then throwing it to the dogs—without having been able to fully document the leg of veal or its substance. Nevertheless, as Tudor Vianu indicated, although Caragiale preferred observation and spontaneity to speculation, he was not averse to pure philosophical analysis, and frequently quoted the classics in defense of his aesthetic guidelines. Late in his life, Caragiale also sparked debates after deriding the emerging Poporanism, a school of thought which took its inspiration from socialism, agrarianism and traditionalism. He is also known to have been amused by the German election of 1907 and the resulting defeat registered by the Social Democratic Party.

Caragiale maintained a friendship with Dobrogeanu-Gherea for much of his life. He was especially interested in news of Dobrogeanu-Gherea having become involved in the 1905 Russian battleship Potemkin scandal, after the aging socialist decided to offer his help to the refugee sailors as they arrived in Constanța. During his time in Berlin, he repeatedly tried to convince the Dobrogeanu-Ghereas to leave their home in Romania and join him abroad. Nonetheless, he criticized the philosopher when the latter refused to be decorated by King Carol I (1909). Around 1907, the dramatist was also interested in the activities of Christian Rakovsky, who was trying to make his way back into Romania, and closely followed news of street clashes between his supporters and the authorities.

== Settings ==
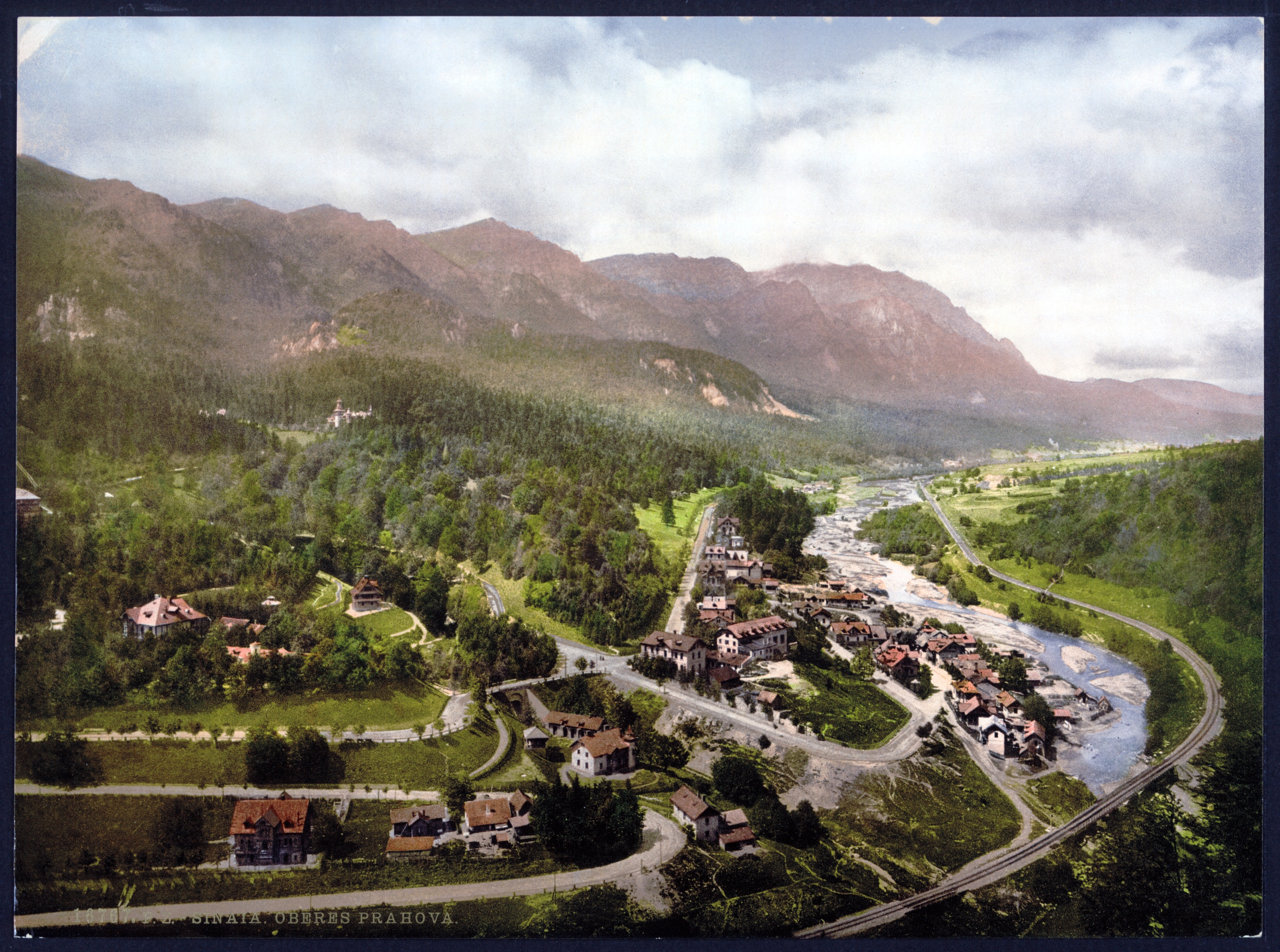
Early 20th century panorama of Sinaia

The writer had a familiarity with the social environments, traits, opinions, manners of speech, means of expression and lifestyle choices of his day — from the rural atmosphere of his early childhood, his experience as a journalist, to the high spheres of politics (National Liberal as well as Conservative, Junimist as well as socialist). A frequent traveler, Caragiale investigated everyday life in most areas of the Romanian Old Kingdom and Transylvania. He was a sociable man: in one of his letters from Berlin, he asked Alceu Urechia to send his regards to over 40 of his acquaintances in Sinaia (from Austro-Hungarian diplomats to street vendors or beggars).

Several of his major works have a rural setting—they include Năpasta, În vreme de război, La hanul lui Mânjoală, Calul dracului, Păcat, and O făclie de Paște, as well as fragments of the pseudo-fairy tales he authored late in life. Nevertheless, Caragiale is foremost known and acclaimed for his urban themes, which form the background to the vast majority of his most accomplished writings.

The author depicted the city in all stages of its development and in all its atmospheres — from nightlife to Căldură mare's midday torpor, from noisy slums and the Târgul Moșilor fête in Obor to the English-inspired tea parties of the urban elite. This large fresco drew comparisons with his generation colleague Ion Creangă, who was argued to have done the same for the countryside. Caragiale was especially proud of the opening paragraph in his Ultima emisiune... story, part of Momente și schițe, which, he believed, the "corner of a slum" was suggested to perfection.

Tudor Vianu also noted that, among cities and towns, Caragiale preferred Bucharest and those provincial centers most exposed to Central European influences (specifically, the summer retreats in the Prahova Valley and other Wallachian stations on the way to Transylvania). The enclosed world of the Romanian Railways also appealed to the writer, and an impressive number of his sketches relate to it in various ways.

== Collective characters ==
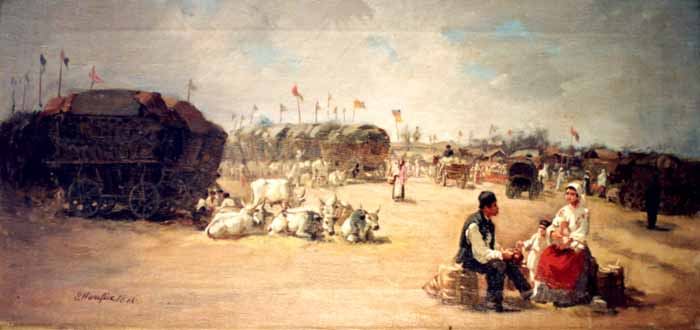
Târgul Moșilor, the fair in Obor (late 19th-century painting by Sava Henția)

Confessing at some point that "the world was my school", Caragiale dissimulated his background and critical eye as a means to blend into each environment he encountered, and even adopted the manners and speech patterns he later recorded in his literary work. He thus encouraged familiarity, allowing people to reveal their histories, motivations, and culture. Vianu recounted: "The man was a consummate actor and a pince-sans-rire, an ironist [...] to the point where his partners of dialog were never sure if they were spoken to 'seriously' [...]." In one of his pieces from 1899, he welcomed the famous actors Eleonora Duse and Jean Mounet-Sully to Bucharest, imitating the exaggerated style of other theater chroniclers—the article ended with Caragiale confessing that he had not actually seen the two perform. In one other instance, as a means to comment on plagiarism, the author also parodied his own O făclie de Paște—which he turned into the sketch, Noaptea Învierii.

In 1907, din primăvară până în toamnă, his late and disillusioned work, Caragiale lashed out at the traditional class of political clients, with an indictment which, Tudor Vianu believed, also served to identify the main focus of his other writings:

"plebs incapable of work and lacking employment, impoverished suburban small traders and street vendors, petty dangerous agitators of the villages and of the areas adjacent to towns, bullying election agents; and then the hybrid product of all levels of schooling, semi-cultured intellectuals, lawyers and lawyerlings, professors, teachers and teacherlings, semi-illiterate and unfrocked priests, illiterate schoolteachers—all of them beer garden theorists; next come the great functionaries and the little clerks, most of them removable from office."

Direct criticism was nonetheless rare in Caragiale's fiction: Vianu believed to have found traces of it in O scrisoare pierdută ("the most cruel [of his satires]") and in Grand Hotel "Victoria română" ("the most bitter"). On several occasions, Caragiale showed or even defined himself as a sentimental, and his modesty was acknowledged by several of his friends. Vianu noted that, alongside his Christian ethos, this contributed to his distant, calm and often sympathetic overall take on society. In his words:

"A wave of charm, of reconciliation with life passes above all [his characters], one which, if it only assumes light and superficial shapes, experienced by naive people with harmless manias, is a sign that the collective existence is taking place in shelter from the great trials."

In contrast with this, Poporanist critic Garabet Ibrăileanu argued that Caragiale actually hated the people who inspired his works, and claimed that the writer had made this clear during one of their conversations. His account was considered doubtful by researcher Ștefan Cazimir, who believed that Ibrăileanu was using it to back a polemic and singular overview of Caragiale's work.

According to Vianu, there is a manifest difference between Ion Luca Caragiale's comedies and his Momente și schițe: the former are, in his view, driven by situations and circumstances, whereas the latter sees Caragiale developing his original perspective to its fullest. This, he argues, was determined by important social changes—a move from a traditional world—awkwardly attempting to digest Westernization, modernization, and Francized culture—, to a more stable and prosperous environment. A similar division was applied by Ibrăileanu.

== Types ==
=== Theoretical aspects ===
The form of Realism favored by Caragiale placed types of characters at the center of literary creativity, owing to the influence of Classicism. Several critics have credited Momente și schițe, as well as all his dramas, with providing some of the first truly believable portrayals in local literature. Vianu stressed that Classicist borrowings in Caragiale's writings were limited, indicating that Caragiale parted with the notion of "generic types" to look for the "social" ones. In parallel, literary critic George Călinescu argued that "[t]he typological structure is present in Caragiale's work as a supporting structure, without being essential."

In Vianu's assessment, the universal human nature was important to Caragiale, but not made instantly obvious (as opposed to the immediate importance his characters were meant to have in the eyes of his public). Vianu illustrated this concept after investigating the manner in which Caragiale completed his O scrisoare pierdută: the author was for long undecided about which character was to win the electoral battle on which the play centers, but opted for Agamiță Dandanache, the senile radical, because his victory was to give the play more depth. Caragiale was thus quoted saying that Dandanache was "more stupid" than the clueless politician Tache Farfuridi, and "more of a scoundrel" than the unprincipled and cunning journalist Nae Cațavencu.

In Vianu's view, Momente și schițe was more vague in this respect, giving little insight into morals and states of mind, whereas the other, longer, novellas did depict feelings and occasionally provided additional details such as physiology or cenesthesia. Also according to Vianu, Ion Luca Caragiale, unlike the Naturalists, was generally not interested in offering the reader access to his characters' psychological background—aside from his Năpasta and Păcat, and O făclie de Paște, he only adopted the psychological technique in satirical contexts, as a means to parody its use. A similar view was expressed by Vianu's predecessor, Silvian Iosifescu, who also stressed that Caragiale always avoided applying the Naturalist technique to its fullest, while George Călinescu himself believed that the characters' motivations in O făclie de Paște are actually physiological and ethnological.

Maiorescu was especially fond of the way in which Caragiale balanced his personal perspective and the generic traits he emphasized: speaking of Leiba Zibal, the Jewish character in O făclie de Paște who defends himself out of fear, he drew a comparison with Shakespeare's Shylock. He thus noted that, for all the differences in style between the two authors, both their characters stood for the Jewish people as a whole. This assessment was backed by Maiorescu's adversary, Constantin Dobrogeanu-Gherea. George Călinescu also believed that, aside from his individual nature, Zibal provided readers with an accurate insight into Jewish reactions to systemic persecution and death threats. Such assessments were rejected by Paul Zarifopol, who opposed generalizations and commented that the work only referred to "[t]he ingenious cruelty of a man maddened by fear".

=== Allegories ===
One of Caragiale's main and earliest types is that of the young man gripped by love, expressing himself through emphatic and Romantic clichés—its main representative is O noapte furtunoasă's Rică Venturiano. As Vianu commented, Caragiale exploited the theme to so much success that it took another generation for youthful love to be presented in a non-comedic context (with the common signature writings of Ștefan Octavian Iosif and Dimitrie Anghel). At the other end are patriarchal figures, heads of families who seem unable or unwilling to investigate their wives' adulterous relations with younger men. This behavior is notably present in O noapte furtunoasă, where the aged Dumitrache fails to note even the most obvious signs that his wife Veta is in love with his good friend Chiriac. A more complex situation is present in O scrisoare pierdută, where political boss Trahanache cannot tell that his wife Joițica is having an affair with Tipătescu, and, when confronted with the evidence, is more interested in proving that she is not.

With Venturiano, Caragiale also introduces criticism of the liberal journalist and lawyers. A law school student, Venturiano contributes long and exaggerated articles to the republican press, which recall those authored by C. A. Rosetti and his collaborators. A more elaborate such character is Nae Cațavencu, who plays a major part in O scrisoare pierdută, and who, using a "Red" discourse, attacks politicians on all sides with turbulent remarks and recourse to blackmail. He profits from the more moderate attitudes of his adversaries to proclaim himself a progressive politician, and he is successful in doing so—Cațavencu rallies around him a group of teachers and other state employees. The only person who is able to stop his rise is Agamiță Dandanache, an old 1848 revolutionary. Danadanche, shown to have been sidelined from politics, makes a comeback at a time when the factions needs his inoffensive presence as a third-party, and, although senile, has a vast experience in blackmailing. Ștefan Cazimir linked Dandanache to a new aristocracy, created around the first generation of Romanian liberals, and likened him to a hidalgo. Tache Farfuridi, a competitor to both, has been described by Cazimir as a conformist self-seeker, in the manner of M. Joseph Prudhomme, a character made famous by Henri Monnier's prose.

Written between the two other comedies, Conu Leonida față cu reacțiunea depicts the long-term effects of republican discourse on its fascinated audience, through the sayings and actions of Leonida. The latter, whose source of income is a state pension, notably supports the notion that the "Red" republic will provide each clerk with a salary, a pension, as well as a debt moratorium—Șerban Cioculescu noted that this request had already been voiced in real life, and issued as a political program by an obscure Utopian socialist named Pițurcă. Eventually, Leonida is convinced that revolution cannot be on the rise, since the authorities have banned the firing of weapons within city limits. Similar fallacies are uttered by one of the secondary characters in D-ale carnavalului, known to the other protagonists as Catindatul, who has a vague familiarity with both subjective idealist and materialist tenets, the sources for his absurd theories about suggestibility and "magnetism"—two processes in which he sees the universal source for all discomfort or disease. In parallel, Zarifopol argued, the writer had even allowed ironic reflections on the impact of various theories to seep into a more serious work, O făclie de Paște, where two students terrify the innkeeper Zibal by casually discussing anthropological criminology.

Several other of Caragiale's characters have traditionally been considered allegories of social classes and even regional identities. One of the most famous ones is Mitică, a recurring character who stands for ordinary Bucharesters, Wallachians or Muntenians in general. A hypocritical and seemingly superficial man, Mitică expresses himself through either platitudes or clichés he believes are clever, and, illustrating a tendency Caragiale first recorded in his Moftul Român, quickly dismisses all important things he is confronted with. Similarly, the teacher Marius Chicoș Rostogan, who is present or named in several sketches, stands for those Transylvanian expatriates in Romania whose sympathies went to the liberal current. His discourse, through which Caragiale sarcastically illustrates liberal tenets in respect to Romanian education, is centered on a disregard for content and a rigor for memorizing irrelevant details. It has been proposed that Rostogan is at least partly based on Vasile Grigore Borgovan, a Transylvanian-born educator and resident of Turnu Severin.

Cetățeanul turmentat, an unnamed inebriated man who makes brief but relevant appearances in O scrisoare pierdută, is thought to symbolize simple townsfolk, utterly confused by the political battle going on around them, and ignored by all the notabilities. Like his counterpart, the police agent Ghiță Pristanda, the inebriated elector has no relevant personal ambition, and stands for the so-called "government dowry"—people afraid of losing their offices, and ready to back whoever is in power. According to Călinescu, the inebriated citizen worships authority as a "supreme god", despite all its absurdities. He repeatedly claims to have served Trahanache during Alexander John Cuza's ousting, but his supposed patron only acknowledges him once, when asking party members to "escort this honorable person outside".

In a number of his short stories and sketches, Caragiale makes use of another particularly Junimist theme, and investigates the glamorous but superficial impact of modernization on high society. In one sketch, a couple of ladies dine in an opulent salon, while cursing their maid, gossiping, and showing interest in vulgar subjects. The characters in these writings tend to resemble each other, evidencing the generic traits of the well-to-do.

=== Other traits and characters ===
Anxieties take the central stage in several of Caragiale's writings. From early on, Caragiale's minute analysis of mounting terror in O făclie de Paște won the praise of Constantin Dobrogeanu-Gherea. In several of his sketches and stories, characters are driven to despair by their inability to cope with real or presumed changes in their environment. This is shown to have happened to characters such as Leiba Zibal, Stavrache—the pub owner in În vreme de război—, as well as Anghelache (the suicide victim in Inspecțiune..., part of Momente și schițe). Șerban Cioculescu referred to the latter three as "great neurotics", while Iosifescu defined Zibal and Stavrache as "demented". Among the group of insane characters in Caragiale's work, Călinescu counted those of sketches and stories like 1 Aprilie ("1st of April"), where an April Fool ends with a murder, and Două loturi, where the clerk Lefter Popescu goes through the tribulations of having lost his winning ticket.

Anxiety over imminent events grips the main characters in Conu Leonida față cu reacțiunea, and plays a part in female behavior as depicted in all his other comedies. A special kind of fear animates the main protagonists of D-ale carnavalului, whose jealousy leads them to act irrationally. Thus, Iancu Pampon, an assistant-barber and former police officer, and his female counterpart, the republican suburbanite Mița Baston, are determined to uncover their partners' amorous escapades, and their hectic inquiry combines real clues with figments of imagination, fits of passionate rage with moments of sad meditation, and violent threats with periods of resignation. Glimpses into this type of behavior have been noted in other plays by Caragiale: Cazimir placed emphasis on the fact that Farfuridi is shown to be extremely cautious towards all unplanned changes, and consumes much of his energy in preserving a largely pointless daily routine.

Many of Caragiale's writings reproduce discussions between clerks on their time off, which usually take the shape of generic and awkward forays into culture or politics. Several of the characters in his sketches spuriously claim to be personal friends of major political figures of the day, or to have access to the back-rooms of politics and journalism. Although often alarmed by political or social developments, they tend to accommodate them quickly, and often encourage each other during very long stays at the beer garden. Gravitating in this environment are the petty journalists, who boast access to unlikely scoops, such as Bulgaria having decided to invade Romania. In one instance, Caragiale invents Caracudi, a newspaperman who writes his sensationalist articles while relaxing in the park.

Caragiale's persona is placed in numerous of his works. Aside from deduced self-portraits in Cănuță om sucit and elsewhere, he created the famous background character Nenea Iancu ("Uncle Iancu"), building on his colloquial name and his status as a regular client of the beer gardens. He introduces several of his Momente și schițe characters as personal friends, and garnishes the stories with intimate details. Late in his life, he even confessed that the affair involving Venturiano, Dumitrache, and Dumitrache's wife Veta was partly based on an amorous misadventure he experienced as a young man.

== Literary influences ==
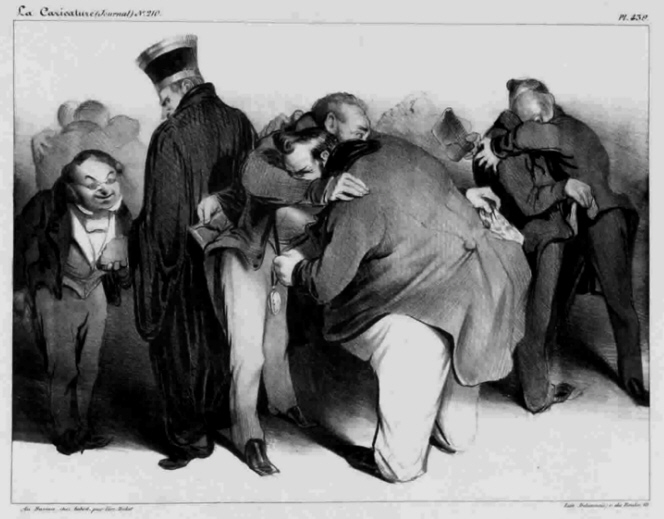
We are all honest people, let's embrace one another, and let this be over with, 1834 print by Honoré Daumier

Aside from the many authors whose works he quoted, translated or parodied, Ion Luca Caragiale built on a vast literary legacy. According to literary historian Ștefan Cazimir: "No writer ever had as large a number of precursors [as Caragiale], just as no other artistic synthesis was ever more organic and more spontaneous."

A man of the theater first and foremost, Caragiale was well-acquainted with the work of his predecessors, from William Shakespeare to the Romantics, and heavily impressed by the French comédie en vaudeville. He applied the notion of well-made plays, as theorized by Eugène Scribe, and was also influenced by the dramaturgy of Eugène Marin Labiche and Victorien Sardou. Reportedly, Labiche was his favorite author.

The writer himself cited Cilibi Moise, a Wallachian Jewish peddler and aphorist, as an early influence, recalling how, as a child, he used to read his one-liner jokes, and treasured them as exceptional samples of concise humor. He was similarly impressed by the works of Moise's contemporary, the prolific author Anton Pann, whose accomplishments he praised during talks with his fellow Convorbiri Critice contributors, and whose work served as a source for at least one of his own stories. Nicolae Filimon, whom Caragiale praised on several occasions, was the author of short stories which several authors have identified as less accomplished versions of Rică Venturiano. A similar connection has been traced between the various sketches authored by Ion Heliade Rădulescu, in which Transylvanian writers are the object of ridicule, and Caragiale's character, Marius Chicoș Rostogan. Caragiale's late admiration for Bogdan Petriceicu Hasdeu was also linked to affinities in comedic styles, as was his companionship with Iacob Negruzzi (himself the author of sarcastic pieces ridiculing the liberal politicians and lawyers).

Caragiale is believed to have used and developed several themes already present in Romanian theatre. One such precursor is the author of comedies Teodor Myller, especially through his play Fata lui Chir Troancă ("Kir Troancă's Daughter"). The writer was most likely very familiar with the comedies authored by his two uncles, Costache and Iorgu Caragiale, which have been shown to develop themes he later explored in depth. Among the minor 19th century dramatists whose comedic works were familiar to Caragiale, and in many ways similar to his, own was Costache Halepliu. Another often-cited influence is his predecessor and adversary Vasile Alecsandri, whose Coana Chirița plays are an early critique of Westernization. The two authors nonetheless differ in many ways, with Caragiale assuming a more complex role, and observing a more complex society.

Ion Luca Caragiale is known to have been amused by the stock character Robert Macaire, at a time when the latter had been turned into a comedic character by Frédérick Lemaître. While in Berlin, he purchased the cartoons of French artists Honoré Daumier and Paul Gavarni (although it is not known if their separate portrayals of Macaire were familiar to him) — among these drawings was one showing notabilities embracing one another while picking each other's pockets, which shows similarities with Caragiale's own take on society. According to Cazimir, it is possible that he knew Daumier's work from early on, as several other subjects caricatured by the French artist bear a remarkable resemblance to his texts.

Ion Luca Caragiale was also keenly aware and receptive of his contemporaries' works and of fin de siècle innovations. The literary creations of Émile Zola were a noted source of inspiration, and the parallel led George Călinescu to propose him and Barbu Ștefănescu Delavrancea as the main representatives of Zola's style in local literature. At the same time, Constantin Dobrogeanu-Gherea believed that both Năpasta and O făclie de Paște showed the "obvious enough influence" of Fyodor Dostoevsky. Late in his life, Caragiale discovered the literature of Anatole France — according to Paul Zarifopol, France's Humanist themes served as a model for some of Caragiale's fantasy writings.

Discussing the latter works, Vianu noted that they reminded one of Shakespeare's late romances, while Șerban Cioculescu believed them to have been indirectly inspired by the works of Edgar Allan Poe. In his report for the academy, Dimitrie C. Ollănescu-Ascanio also drew a parallel between Poe's works and La hanul lui Mânjoală, but this hypothesis was rejected by Zarifopol. In addition, Kir Ianulea, partly using Niccolò Machiavelli's novel as a source, was held as evidence of Caragiale's interest in Renaissance literature.

== Cultural legacy ==
The writer's investigations into Romanian culture also resulted in an accurate record of the Romanian language as it was spoken during his day, sampling dialects, jargon, slang, verbal tics, as well as illustrating the experiments undertaken by conflicting schools of linguistics during the 19th and early 20th century, as well as the traces they left on the Romanian lexis. In Tudor Vianu's opinion, this was partly owed to his keen musical ear.

Caragiale was an enduring influence on both Romanian humor and the views Romanians take of themselves. His comedies and various stories have produced a series of catchphrases, many of which are still present in both cultural reference. Nevertheless, his uncomfortable criticism has occasionally seen him assigned a secondary place in the Romanian curriculum and the academic discourse, a tendency notably endorsed by the Iron Guard and the Socialist Republic of Romania.

In parallel, Caragiale's techniques have influenced 20th century dramatists such as Mihail Sorbul, Victor Ion Popa, Mihail Sebastian, and George Mihail Zamfirescu, and various directors, beginning with Constantin I. Nottara and Paul Gusti. Several of his theatrical writings have been the subject of essays authored by director Sică Alexandrescu, whose interpretation of the texts made use of the Stanislavsky System. Caragiale's short stories and novellas have inspired authors such as Ioan A. Bassarabescu, Gheorghe Brăescu, Ioan Alexandru Brătescu-Voinești, Dumitru D. Pătrășcanu, I. Peltz, and, in later decades, Radu Cosașu, Ioan Lăcustă, Horia Gârbea, and Dumitru Radu Popa. According to various authors, Caragiale was also a predecessor of Absurdism, and he is known to have been cited as an influence by the Absurdist dramatist Eugène Ionesco. Outside Romania, the impact of Ion Luca Caragiale's literature was much reduced—the 1996 Cambridge Paperback Guide to Theatre attributed this to the technical problems posed by translations, as well as to the tendency of staging his works as period pieces. It was not until 2019 that one of his plays, A Lost Letter was performed in English. The translation used on that occasion is held by the Romanian Cultural Institute in London.

Several authors have left memoirs of Ion Luca Caragiale. They include Octavian Goga and Ioan Slavici, I. Suchianu, Luca Caragiale, Ecaterina Logadi-Caragiale, and Cincinat Pavelescu. Among his later biographers was Octav Minar, who stood accused of having forged certain details for commercial gain. Direct or covert depictions of Caragiale are also present in several fiction works, starting with a revue first shown during his lifetime, and including novels by Goga, Slavici, N. Petrașcu, Emanoil Bucuța, Eugen Lovinescu, Constantin Stere, as well as a play by Camil Petrescu. In 1939, B. Jordan and Lucian Predescu, published a common signature novel on the writer, which was criticized for its style, tone, and inaccuracies. The short story writer Brătescu-Voinești proposed that Ion Luca Caragiale's love affair with Veronica Micle and Eminescu's anger provide the key to Eminescu's poem Luceafărul, but his theory remains controversial. Caragiale is also probably present in his son Mateiu's work Craii de Curtea-Veche, where his lifestyle and contribution to literature appear to be the subjects of derision.

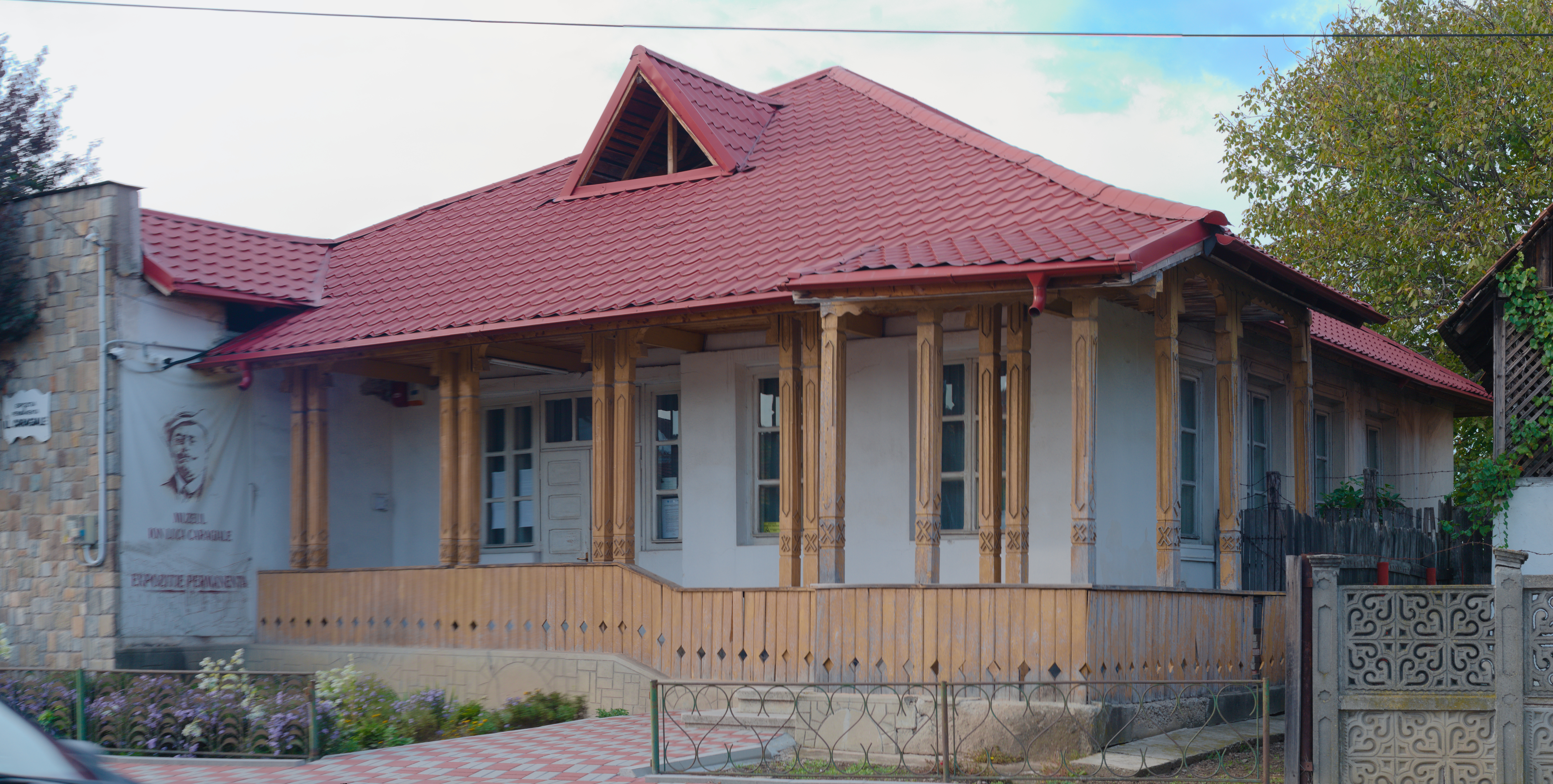
Ion Luca Caragiale memorial house in his native village

The writer was elected to the Romanian Academy posthumously, in 1948, upon the proposal of novelist Mihail Sadoveanu. 2002, the 150th anniversary of Ion Luca Caragiale's birth, was celebrated in Romania as the Anul Caragiale (the "Caragiale Year"). Annual theater festivals in his honor are held in Bucharest and the Moldovan capital of Chișinău. Caragiale's work has been the subject of many productions in Romanian cinema and television—films based on his writings include the 1958 Două lozuri and Lucian Pintilie's 1981 De ce trag clopotele, Mitică?. In 1982, a West German film, directed by Radu Gabrea and based on O făclie de Paște, was released as Fear Not, Jacob!.

The Bucharest National Theater is currently known in full as "Ion Luca Caragiale" National Theater. Several educational institutions were named in his, including the University of Theatre and Film and the Ion Luca Caragiale National College in Bucharest, the national college in Ploiești, and a high school in Moreni. Among the statues raised in his honor are Constantin Baraschi's Bucharest monument, and busts in the capital's Cișmigiu Gardens and in Ploiești. He was the subject of portraits and caricatures by various artists, and, in 2007, upon the completion of a five-year project involving cartoonists inside and outside Romania, he was designated "the most portrayed writer" by the Guinness Book of Records (with over 1,500 individual drawings in a single exhibit).

In 1962, a house in Ploiești has been turned into a museum honoring Caragiale (the Dobrescu House). His native home in Haimanale was opened for the public in 1979. Memorial plaques have also been set up in Buzău and on Schöneberg's Hohenzollerndamm. His name was given to streets, avenues, parks or quarters in many Romanian cities—such landmarks include the Bucharest street he lived on around 1900, a street in Ploiești, a quarter in Brașov, and a park in Cluj-Napoca. A street in Chișinău also bears the name Caragiale.

The novel The Republic by the Romanian-American novelist Bogdan Suceavă (Polirom Press, 2018) has as main character a 17-year old Ion Luca Caragiale, and depicts his involvement with the coup d'état attempt from 8 August 1870, in Ploiești.
