= Vatra (Romanian magazine) =

Romanian literary magazine

The Vatra literary magazine was founded in 1885 by Ion Luca Caragiale, George Coşbuc and Ioan Slavici and was published in Romanian in the city of Târgu Mureş, Transylvania, Austria-Hungary (now in Romania).

A new series of the magazine was published starting May 1971 under the direction of poet and playwright Romulus Guga.

Vatra means "the hearth" in Romanian.
