= I. L. Caragiale, Dâmbovița =

I. L. Caragiale
- Commune
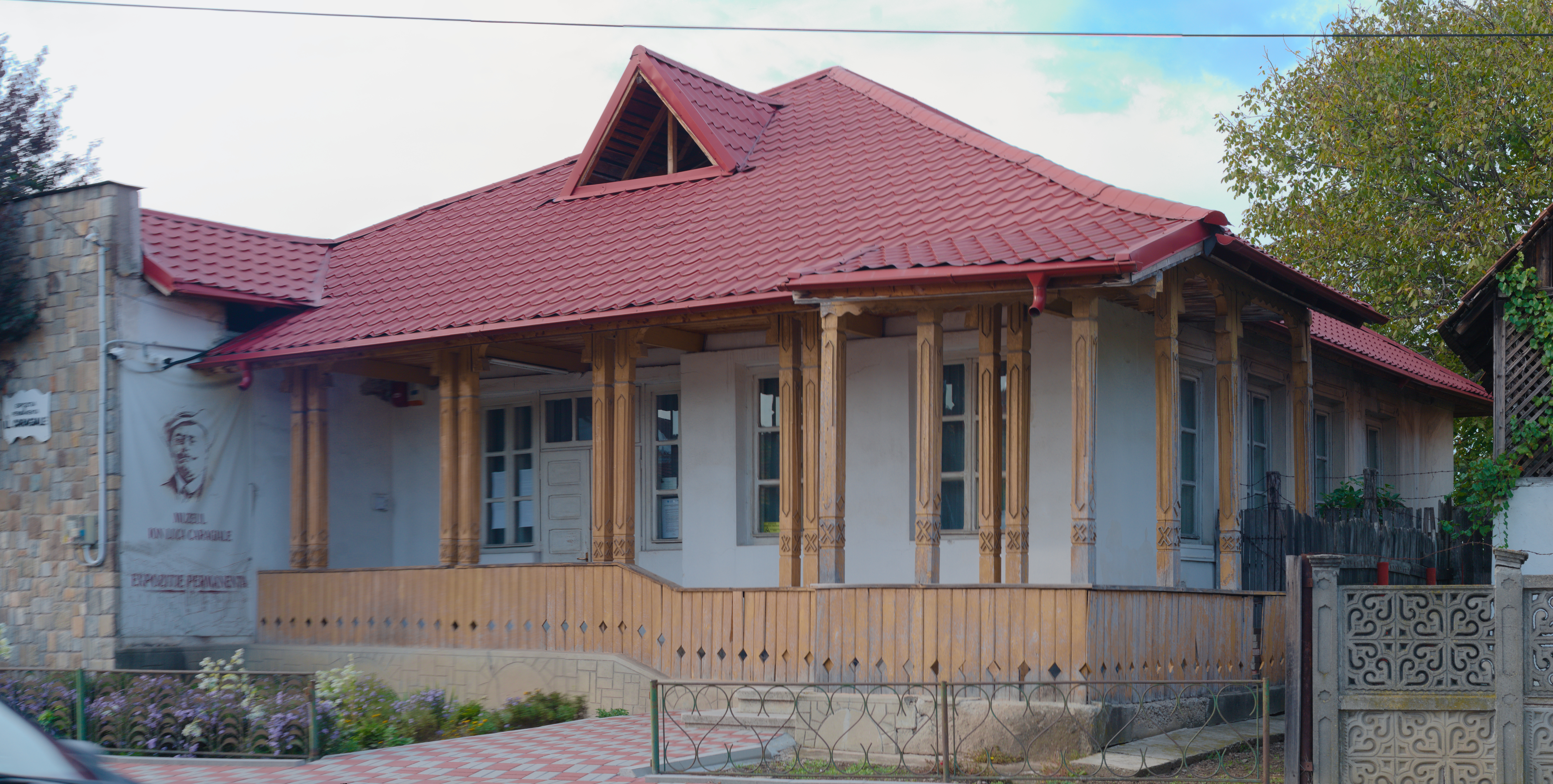
- Ion Luca Caragiale memorial house

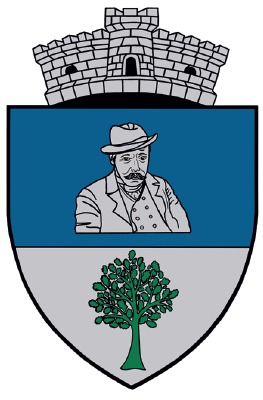
- Coat of arms

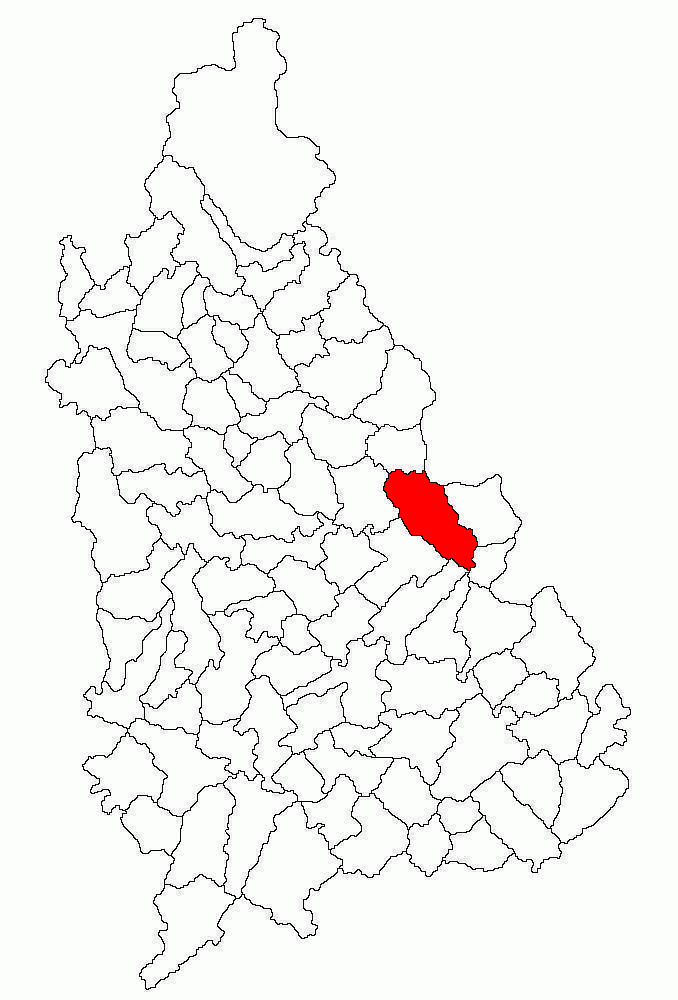
- Location in Dâmbovița County

- Location in Romania
- Coordinates: 44°54′25″N 25°42′18″E
- Country: Romania
- County: Dâmbovița

Government
  - Mayor (2024–2028): Adrian Năstase (PSD)
- Area: 61.78 km^{2} (23.85 sq mi)
- Elevation: 222 m (728 ft)
- Population (2021-12-01): 6,920
  - Density: 112/km^{2} (290/sq mi)
- Time zone: UTC+02:00 (EET)
  - Summer (DST): UTC+03:00 (EEST)
- Postal code: 137255
- Area code: +(40) 245
- Vehicle reg.: DB
- Website: primariacaragiale.ro

I. L. Caragiale is a commune in Dâmbovița County, Muntenia Romania. It was first attested in 1482 or 1495. Known as Haimanale (hooligans) until 1952, it is the birthplace of the well known playwright Ion Luca Caragiale. The commune is composed of three villages: Ghirdoveni (the commune center), I. L. Caragiale, and Mija.

Historical population
Year	Pop.	±%
2002	9,093	—
2011	7,697	−15.4%
2021	6,920	−10.1%
Source: Census data
