= O făclie de Paște =

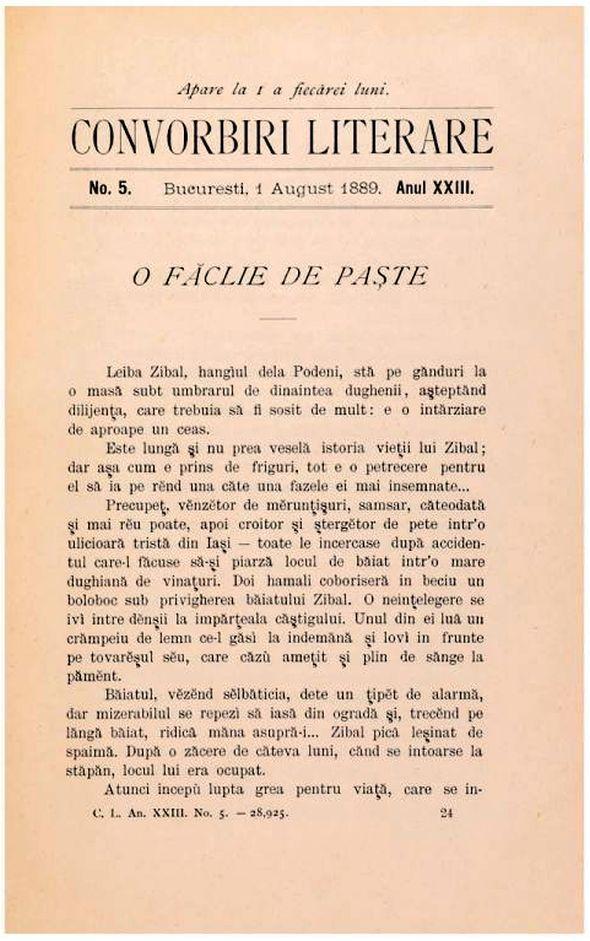
O Făclie de Paște

O făclie de Paște or O făclie de Paști (Romanian for "An Easter Torch") is a naturalistic novella written by Romanian writer Ion Luca Caragiale. It was first published in Convorbiri Literare (no. XXIII/1889–1890) and as a self-standing brochure in 1892. Subsequently, it was included in many anthologies and editions of Caragiale's prose. The novella was freely adapted to the screen by Radu Gabrea in his 1981 film, Fear Not, Jacob!.
