= Mite Kremnitz =

German writer (1852–1916)

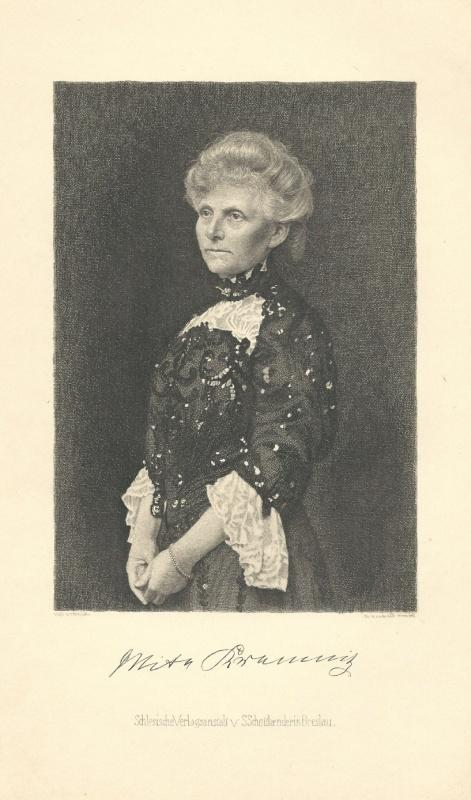
Mite Kremnitz with autograph, c. 1905

Mite Kremnitz (4 January 1852, Greifswald – 18 July 1916 in Berlin), born Marie von Bardeleben (pen names George Allan, Ditto and Idem), was a German writer.

== Biography ==
Kremnitz was the daughter of the famous surgeon Heinrich Adolf von Bardeleben. She grew up in Greifswald, London, and, beginning in 1868, Berlin. Later she married the doctor Wilhelm Kremnitz and moved with him to Bucharest in 1875. The couple had two children.

In Romania, Marie became good friends with Queen Elisabeth, who wrote poems, novels, and short stories under the nom de plume Carmen Sylva, and in 1881 she was appointed her maid of honor. They published several novels and a drama in collaboration, Marie signing with the pseudonym Ditto and Idem. In 1890, she changed it to Mite Kremnitz.

After her husband's death in 1897, Kremnitz returned to Berlin. She died on 18 July 1916, aged 64.

== Works ==
- Rumänische Dichtungen ("Romanian Poems"), 1881
- Fluch der Liebe ("The Curse of Love"), short stories, 1881
- Neue rumänische Skizzen ("New Romanian Sketches"), 1881
- Rumänische Märchen ("Romanian Fairy-Tales"), 1882
- Aus der rumänischen Gesellschaft ("From The Romanian Society"), two novels, 1882
- Ein Fürstenkind ("A Princely Child"), a novel, 1883
- Rumäniens Anteil am Kriege 1877-78 ("Romania's Participation in The War of 1877-78"), 1887
- as Ditto and Idem: Anna Boleyn, historic drama, 1886 (together with Carmen Sylva)
- as Ditto and Idem: Astra, an epistolary novel, 1886 (together with Carmen Sylva)
- as Ditto and Idem: Feldpost ("The Postal Service"), an epistolary novel, 1886 (together with Carmen Sylva)
- as Ditto and Idem: Rache und andere Novellen ("The Revenge and Other Short Stories"), 1888 (together with Carmen Sylva)
- as Ditto and Idem: In der Irre ("Astray"), short stories, 1887 (together with Carmen Sylva)
- Ausgewanderte ("Emigrated"), a novel, 1890
- Elina. Zwischen Kirche und Pastorat ("Elina. Between the Church and the Pastorate"), two short stories, 1894
- Sein Brief ("His Letter"), short stories, 1896
- Herr Baby. Eine Kindergeschichte ("Mr. Baby. A Child Story"), 1901
- Mann und Weib ("Man and Woman"), short stories, 1902
- Am Hofe der Ragusa ("At the Ragusa Court"), a novel, 1902
- Fatum ("Fate"), stories, 1903
- König Karol von Rumänien. Ein Lebensbild ("King Carol of Romania. A Biography"), 1903
- Carmen Sylva, a biography, 1903
- Maria, Fürstin Mutter zu Wied, Prinzessin zu Nassau. Lebensbild ("Maria, Princess-Mother of Wied, Princess of Nassau. A Biography"), 1904
- Mutterrecht ("Matriarchy"), short stories, 1906
- Eine Hilflose ("A Helpless Woman"), a novel, 1906
- Was die Welt schuldig nennt ("What The World Calls Guilty"), 1907
- Der rote Streif. Eine Liebesgeschichte ("The Red Stripe. A Love Story"), 1908
- Ist das - das Leben? ("Is This The Life?"), Roman, 1909
- Die Getäuschten ("The Deceived"), Roman, 1909
- Laut Testament ("According To The Will"), Roman, 1911
- Das Geheimnis der Weiche ("The Secret of The Gate"), stories, 1913
