= N. T. Orășanu =

Romanian poet, writer and editor

Nicolae T. Orășanu (1833?–August 7, 1890) was a Wallachian-born Romanian poet, prose writer, and newspaper editor.

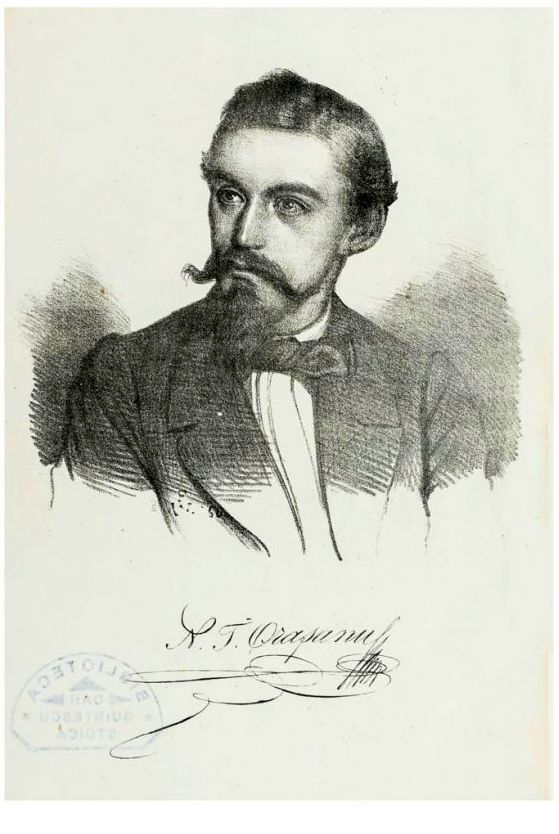
Portrait of Nicolae T. Orășanu

== Biography ==
Born in Craiova, he attended high school at Saint Sava College in the national capital Bucharest. As a young man, Orășanu entered politics and the newspaper business; his was a rebellious spirit that rejected autocracy and embraced being in opposition. Together with C. A. Rosetti, he edited Țânțarul in 1859. Then, on his own, he edited a series of satirical gazettes. These mainly had ingenious demonic titles: Spiriduș, Nichipercea, Cicala, Sarsailă, Urzicătorul, Asmodeu, but also Opiniunea națională, Daracul, Ghimpele, Farfara and Cucu. At the same time, he published brochures in the same style: Coarnele lui Nichipercea, Coada lui Nichipercea, Ochiul dracului, Codița dracului, Ghearele dracului. Orășanu signed either using his initials or pen names such as G. Palicaropol, Cetățenescu, Iago, Ioana lui Vișan, Văduva, Netto, Nicor, Odobașa and Orășenescu.

Orășanu made his published debut early, with the 1854 volume Floricele de primăvară. This featured sentimental poems that formed a marked contrast to his biting temperament, yielding to the prevailing Romantic mood. His main literary preoccupation became the "rhymed chronicle", cultivated with a certain trivial verve and appearing in a series of brochures with parodic titles such as Misterele mahalalelor sau Cronica scandaloasă a orașului (vol. I-IX, 1857-1858), Târgul cu idei sau Buletinul Cișmegiului (vol. I-IX, 1857) and Trei feți logofeți sau Povestea lui Fâl-fâl-son (1857). Through such "verse novels", at least insofar as typology, attitude and vernacular style are concerned, Orășanu was a precursor to the literature of the slum. He was more successful as a memoirist, in the 1861 Întemnițările mele politice. He drew upon the example of Silvio Pellico to evoke his prison experiences, leavening his narrative with humor. In the brochure O pagină a vieții mele sau 22, 23 și 24 ianaurie 1859, another memoir, he claimed to have played a much-exaggerated role in the election as domnitor of Alexandru Ion Cuza. The writer later became an adversary of the ruler, directing the verse pamphlet Trefleac voivod against him.

He translated works by Charles Paul de Kock (Sora Ana, 1856), Jean-Pierre Claris de Florian (Gonzalv de Cordova, 1858) and Jean-Louis Carra (Istoria Moldaviii și a Româniii). Orășanu worked as an inspector at the tobacco monopoly and then at the liquor taxation office, and was twice a manager at Monitorul Oficial and at the official press, Imprimeria Statului. Nevertheless, his financial situation was insecure. More than his writings, his biography makes Orășanu a very colorful figure during a period of transition.

He died in Negreni, Olt County.
