= Barbu Solacolu =

Romanian poet and social scientist (1897–1976)

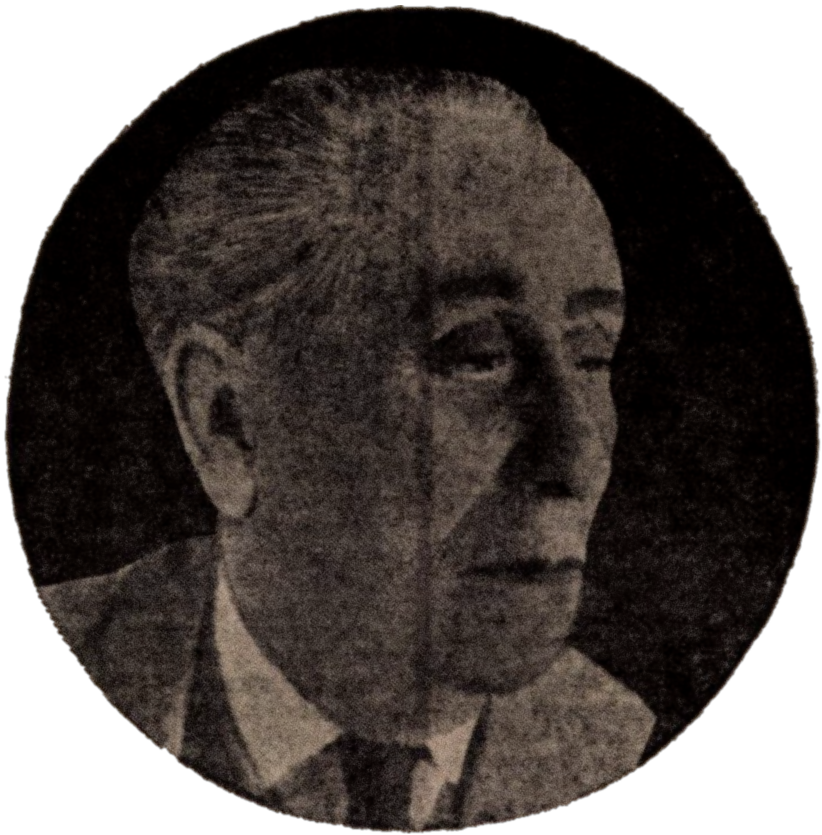
- Solacolu in 1974
- Born: March 17, 1897; Bucharest, Kingdom of Romania
- Died: October 30, 1976 (aged 79); Bucharest, Socialist Republic of Romania
- Occupations: Journalist; economist; editor; translator; academic; civil servant; politician; soldier; industrialist
- Writing career
- Pen name: S. Barbu; Barsol; Falstaff
- Period: 1906–1976
- Genres: Lyric poetry; sonnet; dramatic poem; essay; memoir; sketch story
- Movements: Symbolism (Romanian); Decadence

Barbu Solacolu (March 17, 1897 – October 30, 1976) was a Romanian poet, translator, civil servant and social scientist. Born into a prosperous and intellectual family, he became a late affiliate of the Symbolist movement, bringing to it his own leftist sympathies and agrarianism. Despite spending the early stages of World War I among non-interventionists such as Alexandru Bogdan-Pitești and Ioan Slavici, he eventually served with distinctions as a cavalry commander, and also participated in the Hungarian–Romanian War. Solacolu trained as an economist in Weimar Germany, returning to serve the Romanian state as a civil servant. He had a marginal presence in national politics, first with the Democratic Nationalist Party, as a disciple of Nicolae Iorga, and then as a leading member of the Agrarian Union Party. He was noted in local academia for his essays on Revisionist Marxism.

During World War II, Solacolu presided upon the National Association of Chemical Industries, which handled contracts with Nazi Germany. He was pushed out of politics in the late 1940s with the inauguration of Romania's communist regime, spending the 1950s and '60s as a translator; his main contributions in that field were Romanian renditions from William Shakespeare, some of which made it into the definitive edition put out by Leon Levițchi. In old age, Solacolu, who had met some of Romania's leading personalities, made a celebrated return as a memorist, and was interviewed by oral historians.

== Biography ==
=== Early life ===
Solacolu once specified that his birth date was March 17, 1897 (Old Style: March 5), against sources which have March 18. His exact place of birth was a family townhouse on Astronomului Street 6, in Bucharest. Barbu was the son of Victor Solacolu, a magistrate, and Victoria (née Petrescu), daughter of military doctor (and Romanian Land Forces General) Zaharia Petrescu. Before marrying Solacolu, Victoria had been his secretary; her sister, Alina, was the wife of zoologist Grigore Antipa. Victor was the scion of a prosperous merchant family, of Bulgarian heritage, whose members where, by his own account, "many, so very many", virtually none of them having left Bucharest in his own lifetime. He also reports that the shared surname originates with a Turkish-language nickname, Solak ("Left-handed"), bestowed on his grandfather Hagi-Anghel. The latter had built his fortune around the Solacoglu Inn. From him and from his father, Dimitrie Solacolu, Barbu had inherited the Hanul cu Tei business and a large estate in Sărulești. Victor's brother, Theodor Solacolu, a noted botanist, was also a Symbolist author, as was (occasionally) his other brother, Alfred. Other relatives include chemist Șerban C. Solacolu, engineer Paul Solacolu, and publicist Ion Solacolu.

Barbu, who was Victor and Victoria's second son (his elder, Fernand, had been born in Belgium), lived in Lipscani area between the ages of 1 and 33. His family's social positioning allowed him to meet various historical figures, including senior politician Petre P. Carp, comedian Jean Montaureanu, or the aviation pioneer Aurel Vlaicu. He would later recount that Vlaicu disguised his flying anxiety by taking sips of alcohol before each takeoff. Young Solacolu attended the Golescu primary school, outside Antim Monastery, from 1904 to 1907.

Between 1908 and 1913, Solacolu studied at Gheorghe Lazăr and Saint Sava high schools. At age 15, his academic excellence was acknowledged by Tinerimea Română cultural society, which awarded him a collector's book of history, but he sold this and other items to an antiquarian bookshop, preferring monetary rewards to feed his smoking habit. Solacolu was first attracted to poetry "around 1906", when he was vacationing with General Constantin Iarca, his uncle, in Valea Călugărească; he wrote a piece dedicated to Joan of Arc, which Iarca read and corrected, teaching him the standards of rhyme and prosody. He was one of the youngsters who had been impressed by the traditionalist historian and theorist, Nicolae Iorga, and read Iorga's journal, Sămănătorul—which also acquainted him with the naturalistic prose of Constantin Sandu-Aldea, whom he considered a great author. He sent a sketch story to be published in Sămănătorul, in 1909, but received a flat rejection.

=== Symbolist debut ===
The young man slowly changed focus, arriving at the brand of mainline Symbolism cherished by Panait Cerna, Dimitrie Anghel, Ion Minulescu, and Donar Munteanu; he was also directly influenced by his three high-school colleagues and friends: Poldi Chapier, Tristan Tzara, and Ion Vinea (though he was not interested in collaborating on their review, Simbolul). He made his pseudonymous debut (as "Barsol" and "Falstaff") in the 1911 editions of the Symbolist review Versuri și Proză, his work also taken up in Sărbătoarea Eroilor, in Ovid Densusianu's Vieața Nouă, and in N. D. Cocea's Rampa and Facla. Solacolu was also published, with his full name, by Constantin Banu's Flacăra in 1912—he noted that he had used the "then-fashionable" amphibrach, and that the same issue also featured the debut of a poet he viewed as more accomplished than him, namely D. Iacobescu. At Rampa, he completed and published a Romanian version of Roberto Bracco's Fiori d'arancio—this being his first contribution to theater.

In collaboration with Al. Westfried, Solacolu translated and published from Maeterlinck's Serres chaudes. Scholar Remus Zăstroiu revisited this as an outstanding contribution, given its "surprising zeal". Solacolu's own youth poetry was a mixture of Symbolism (which he himself identified as a subset of "mystical romanticism") and decadent writing.

With time, Solacolu turned to a more bucolic style, which, according to reviewers such as Șerban Cioculescu and Virgil Gheorghiu, anticipated better known contributions by Ion Pillat. Gheorghiu praised Solacolu for his poetic concision and preciseness, which also characterized his contribution as a translator. Zăstroiu notes the diversity of critical assessments, with critics seeing Solocaolu as either a traditionalist in line with Ștefan Octavian Iosif or a modern poet à la George Bacovia. Zăstroiu validates both these assessments: in his definition, Solacolu managed to bring together "Symbolist accessories" such as the "aquatic mystery" into a "rural landscape that is not at all engulfed in nostalgia for the past".

From 1913 to 1915, Solacolu completed two years of studies at the University of Bucharest's law faculty. During those months, with Romania still neutral in what became World War I, Solacolu was marginally involved with the literary-political circles of Alexandru Bogdan-Pitești and Ioan Slavici, which were supportive of the Central Powers. Decades later, he confessed to having purposefully stayed away from controversy, only publishing politically neutral literature in Slavici's Ziua; he also recalled seeing a passive Slavici taking orders from Bogdan-Pitești, the alleged spy. Solacolu was drafted into the Land Forces, upon Romania's entry into war. Part of his family remained in Bucharest, which soon fell to the Germans. Barbu followed the army on its northeastern retreat, went to the Iași military school, and eventually participated in the Budapest Campaign as a second lieutenant in the cavalry. He received the Military Virtue Medal and was an Officer of the Order of the Crown.

=== Entering politics ===
The war did not interrupt Solacolu's literary work, with samples taken up by Convorbiri Literare in 1915, and by Letopiseți in 1918–1919. However, by his own account, he had destroyed most of the poetry written in that interval. He ultimately took his law degree in Bucharest in December 1918. In 1920, he issued the poetry volume Umbre pe drumuri ("Shadows on the Roads"), bridging Symbolism with proletarian sympathies; though nominally issued by Convorbiri Literare, it was in fact self-published. He took pride in noting that the volume was well received across ideological divides, with encouragements published by Iorga and Pillat, of the traditionalists, as well as by Vianu and Ion Barbu, of the post-Symbolists (the latter were especially enthusiastic about one of his sonnets). This volume was followed in 1922 by a brochure on Fyodor Dostoyevsky, first published in its German version at Berlin. It was noted as a poetic commentary and introduction to that writer's style and themes, but also as a "critical analysis" of life in Soviet Russia. He would then publish similar monographs on Henri de Saint-Simon (1925) and Werner Sombart (1930).

Solacolu abandoned the Densusianu circle in a rude manner, for which he later expressed his regret; instead, he returned to traditionalism as a disciple of Iorga, describing himself as entirely absorbed by the latter's charisma. He became an editor at Iorga's Neamul Românesc in 1923, while also being hosted in Vinea's Contimporanul. In 1924, he made his second appearance in Convorbiri Literare, contributing to the magazines Vieața Nouă, Sburătorul, and Cuvântul Liber. Solacolu saw himself as the direct inspiration for Pillat's work as a poet, noting however that his imitator managed to surpass him; this observation made him pause his career in fine letters, and led him to concentrate his efforts on scholarly pursuits. Though himself a jurist, Hurmuz Aznavorian advised him to avoid specializing in law, and guided him toward sociology—also telling him to pursue his studies in Weimar Germany. As Solacolu recounted later in life, heeding this advice only deepened his conflict with Densusianu, the lifelong Francophile. He continued his studies at the University of Berlin from 1920 to 1923, earning doctorates in philosophy and economic sciences in the latter year. His professors included Sombart, Heinrich Herkner and Alois Riehl. While in Germany, he led a schism of the Academic Society, which represented Romanian students abroad, after the group had denied membership to a Jewish applicant, Emil Lupescu. The episode was received with annoyance at home, with Densusianu writing an article which chided Solacolu for not having done his best to reconcile with his peers; Solacolu responded through the press, insinuating that Densusianu was providing indirect support to "chauvinism". He later regretted this stance, noting that he had incorrectly surmised Densusianu's motives.

As a sign of Solacolu's disengagement from literary life, in 1926 he was stripped of his membership in the Romanian Writers' Society (having joined it in 1920). According to Zăstroiu, Solacolu was for a while affiliated with Alexandru Marghiloman's Progressive Conservative Party. By April 1924, he had entered Iorga's Democratic Nationalist Party, being welcomed at its public meetings as a member of the "young guard". A public auditor at the Ministry of Justice from 1925, and an honorific associate professor at the Academy of Higher-level Commercial Studies, he was also active in Dimitrie Gusti's Social Institute. Furthermore, Solacolu held positions in the economic and administrative bureaucracy of Greater Romania, including economic adviser to the ministries of Foreign Affairs and Finance, and commissioner at the National Credit Union.

=== Theoretician and bureaucrat ===
Solacolu was becoming known as an independent social and political thinker. In 1925, with an article in Țara de Jos, he supported regionalism as an organic and natural setting for national life. That year, he traveled to Vălenii de Munte and held a seminary "on Marxism" at Iorga's "summer university". A contributor to Gusti's Arhiva pentru Știință și Reformă Socială, he was quoted for his 1929 critical study of Henri de Man and Marxian Revisionism. Before October 1932, Solacolu had joined the Constantin Argetoianu-led Agrarian Union Party (PUA), putting out its newspaper, Pământul Nostru; he had split with Iorga, who, in return, scolded him publicly. He ran unsuccessfully in the December 1933 election, as head of the PUA list for the Assembly of Deputies in Tighina County; the list took 1,621 from a total of approximately 39,000 votes cast, and Solacolu was therefore not among the five PUA deputies emerging from that race.

In July 1938, Solocolu was serving on the National What Commission, which was presided upon by agronomist Gheorghe Ionescu-Sisești, and which organized agricultural competition across Romania. He then attended the Thessaloniki International Fair of September, as a delegate for the General Union of Romanian Industrialists (UGIR). In December, he became UGIR's secretary. By then, he was publicizing his own ideas about the crisis of capitalism, which, he argued, had been rendered inevitable by monopolistic tendencies and the Great Depression. During the first months of World War II, he was arguing that "technological gigantism" and the Soviet five-year plans had made it impossible for Romania not to embrace a planned economy.

During 1941, with Romania as an ally of Nazi Germany, Solacolu was appointed head of the National Association of Chemical Industries (ANIC), which delivered for the German war industry. In 1942, he published a German-language treatise on Romania's economy, Das neue Rumänien im Werden ("New Romania in the Making"). Following the August 1944 Coup, when Romania went over to the Allies, Solacolu was kept on the new administrative bodies. In early 1945, still representing ANIC, he joined a Coordinating Committee which provided supplies for the transiting Red Army; at around that time, he virtually completed his main work of memoirs. Though read and praised by Argetoianu, the manuscript remained unpublished. By the end of the year, the Propaganda Ministry pulled Das neue Rumänien im Werden from the bookshops, singling it out as "detrimental to the good relationship between Romania and the United Nations."

=== Communist regime and old age ===
By 1945, Solacolu had switched focus back on his literary career, beginning work on a dramatic poem, Demosthene. In February 1946, the Romanian Communist Party denounced him as the ringleader of a "Hitlerite association", and alleged that he was responsible for the nationwide shortages of soap. He still tried his comeback in politics with Argetoianu's new group, the National Union for Work and Reconstruction—he was secretary of its Studies Group in March 1947, and a member of its permanent delegation by June. His uncle Theodor, who worked for the Romanian Legation in Vatican City, had a publicized dispute with the communist leadership, and defected in early 1948. He spent his later life in Buenos Aires. Barbu survived the establishment of Romania's communist regime, and later returned to more favor. From the late 1950s, he was mainly active as a translator, from Shakespeare (he took pride in completing a Romanian version of Shakespeare's sonnets in their entirety), but also from Pierre de Ronsard, Giosuè Carducci, William Styron (The Long March), Cyprian Ekwensi (Burning Grass), and Elizabeth Barrett Browning (Sonnets from the Portuguese). His work on Ronsard, appearing in 1959 at Editura Tineretului, was regarded as "honorable" and "delicate" by the literary reviewer Lidia Bote (though she noted that some fragments had "alterations of meaning" and at least one "serious blunder").

In 1968, Solacolu reissued Umbre pe drumuri in expanded form. During the early 1970s, he was a steady contributor to Viața Românească, using the pen names "B. S.", "S. B.", and "S. Barbu", publishing recollections of literary life in Secolul 20 and România Literară. Alongside Sergiu Dan, D. I. Suchianu and others, he was a regular at sessions organized by the Museum of Romanian Literature; his interviews appeared in the 1976 collection 13 Rotonde 13. Solacolu's full memoirs appeared as Evocări. Confesiuni. Portrete (Cartea Românească, 1974), and in large part focused on tracing his family's long history. Zăstroiu praises his way of "intensely reliving" certain events, revisited in an "apparently random manner" and intertwined with "profound observations" about the economy and "social climate" of his era. Both Zăstroiu and Cioculescu call Solacolu a "remarkable portraitist". The memoirs carried twin introductions: a 1945 letter by Argetoianu and a preface by critic Mihai Gafița. The latter jokingly accused Solacolu of "betrayal", in that his activity as an economist had eclipsed his poetic self. Additionally, the work intrigued Cioculescu with its claim to not have experienced childhood amnesia. He had prepared for print another book, as Măști, lecturi și interpretări, and had arranged for his collected works to be issued with Editura Dacia. Under a separate contract with Editura Minerva, he had also completed translations from Alfred de Vigny, and had his Demosthene submitted for review by the National Theatre Bucharest.

During his final year, Solacolu was accepting interviews, conversing with the young essayist Dorin Tudoran and also meeting with students at a high school in Balta Albă. The writer died in Bucharest on October 30, 1976, and was buried at Bellu cemetery on November 3. At the time, Timișoara National Theater was using his translation for a staging of Shakespeare's Henry VI, Part 3. His Shakespearean renditions were still used, though in a heavily edited form, by Anglist Leon Levițchi, who curated a definitive Romanian Shakespeare edition in 1982–1991. In 1978, Tudoran issued a book of interviews, which contained some of Solacolu's thoughts on the literary reconsideration of three fin de siècle writers: D. Iacobescu, Donar Munteanu, Constantin Sandu-Aldea. Solacolu's widow Ecaterina, also known as "Ketty", died in Bucharest in December 1988. The writer was also survived by a daughter, Josette, and a grandson, Andrei.
