= Gabroveni Inn =

Hotel in Romania

Coordinates: 44°25′50.90″N 26°6′6.66″E

Gabroveni Inn (Romanian: Hanul Gabroveni) is a hotel in the historic part of old Bucharest, Romania.

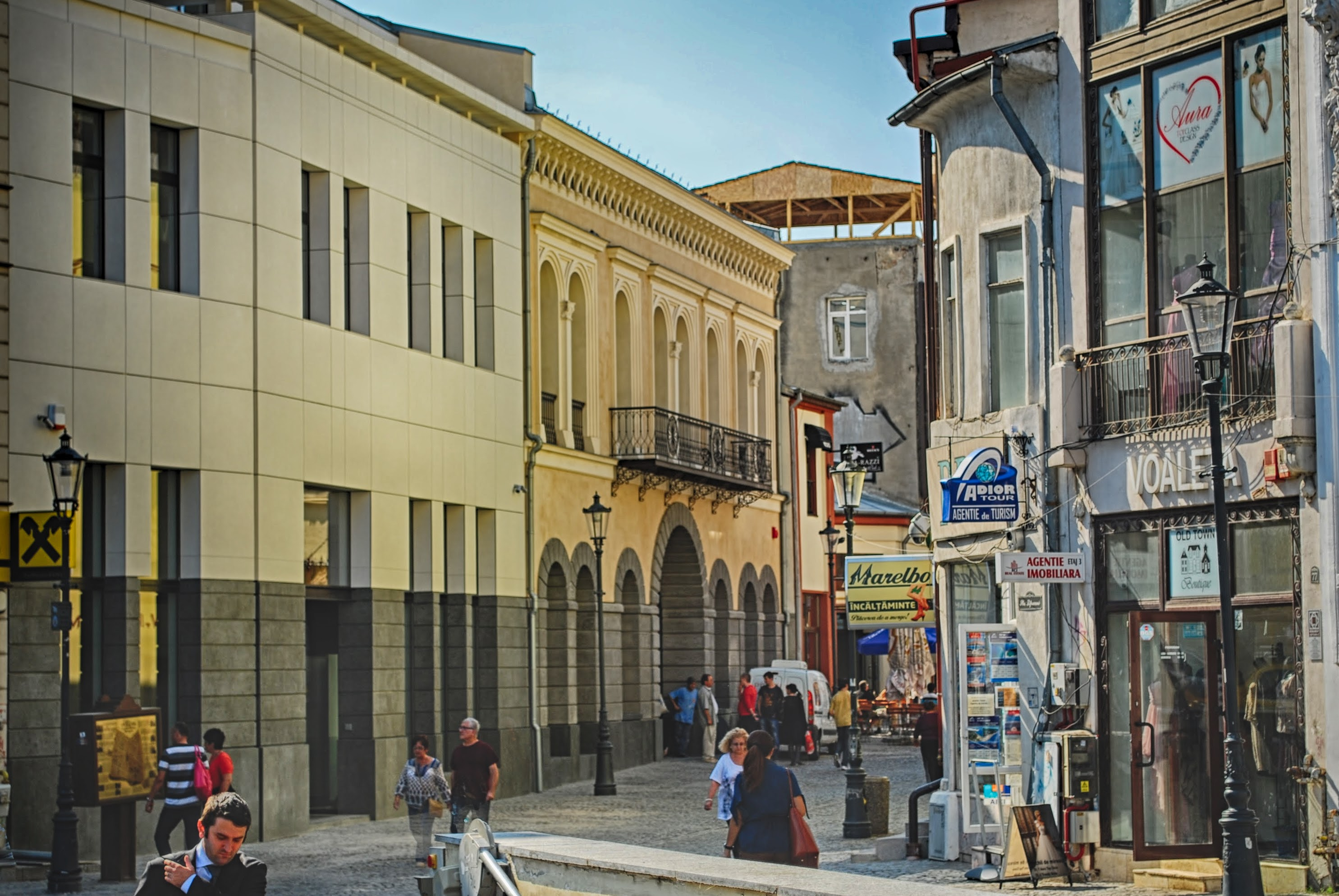

== History ==
Built in 1739 on a land plot belonging to the former Voivodal Court (which was much larger than the present-day ruins of the Old Court—Romanian: Curtea Veche—show), the inn belonged to the "Inner Town" (Romanian: Târgul Dinlǎuntru), the inside section of Bucharest's Fortress. The inn was raised by Prince Constantin Mavrocordat, who decided to have a bezesten (the word is Turkish, meaning "large, square building, hosting shops all around, like in marketplaces"). These shops could only be rented by foreign merchants during the period they stayed in Bucharest doing business.

The inn was also known during the 18th century as Hanul Bezesten ("Bezesten Inn"), because it resembles a Turkish bezesten, boasting large shades covering almost the whole street on the sides. Merchants from the famous crafts town of Gabrovo used to lodge at the inn when selling their products in the city. The inn was named after these merchants, as was the street on which it is located, a name that has survived into the 21st century.

It was among the seven large inns in Bucharest that did not incorporate a church (the others being Manuc's Inn, Constantin Vodǎ, Papazoglu, Golescu, Zamfir and Filipescu inns). During the 18th and 19th century, it burned several times, but it was always repaired and refurbished. The inn reached its glory between 1825 and 1850, when it ranked among the most important such settlements in the town.

At the beginning of the 20th century, the inn was renamed as "Gabroveni-Universal Hotel", as Bucharest was changing from Oriental to French influence. The structure remained in use during the communist regime, and now hosts rooms for the students of the University of Bucharest.

From 2009 to 2014, the inn was restored under the aegis of ARCUB, the cultural arm of the city government of Bucharest, and transformed into their own headquarters, with a 200-seat theater, a 50-seat studio theater, and exposition and conference spaces.

Other inns still standing in Bucharest include Manuc's Inn (Romanian: Hanul lui Manuc), the Lindentree Inn (almost universally referred to by its Romanian name Hanul cu Tei) and Solacoglu Inn (Romanian: Hanul Solacoglu or Hanul Solacolu).
