= Manuc Bei =

Armenian merchant, diplomat (1769–1817)

Emanuel Mirzoyan
- Էմանուել Միրզոյան
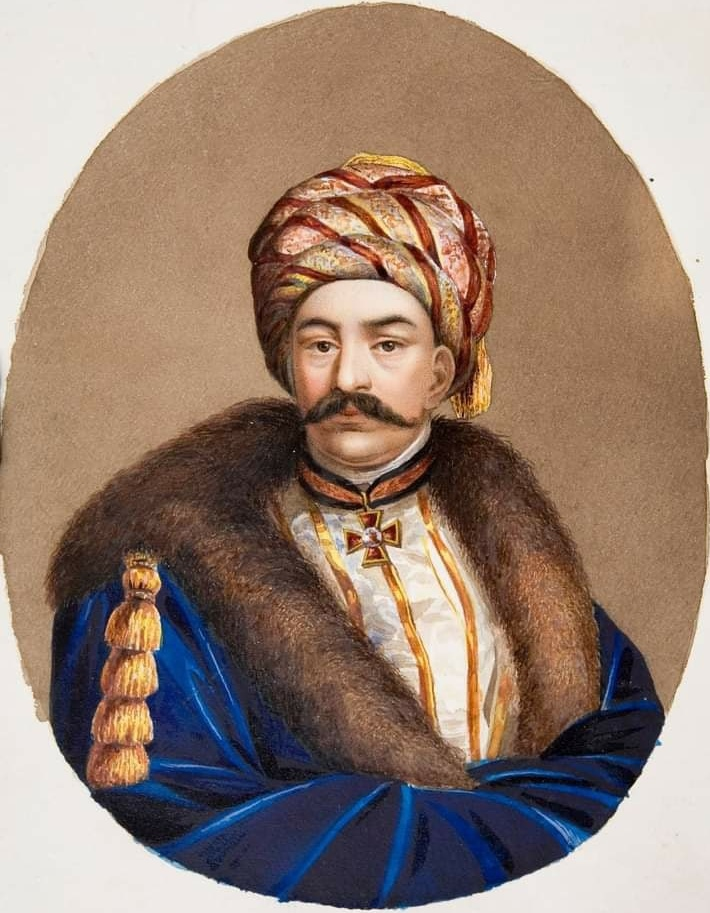
- Born: 1769; Rusçuk, Ottoman Bulgaria, Ottoman Empire
- Died: 1817 (aged 47–48); Hîncești, Bessarabia Governorate, Russian Empire
- Resting place: Armenian Church in Chișinău
- Occupations: merchant, diplomat, and inn-keeper

Knyaz Manuc Bey (the common Romanian rendering of Manuk Bey, the Armenian name of Emanuel Mârzayan; 1769–1817) was an Armenian merchant, diplomat, boyar and inn-keeper.

== Life ==
Princely Coat of arms of the Manuc Bei family

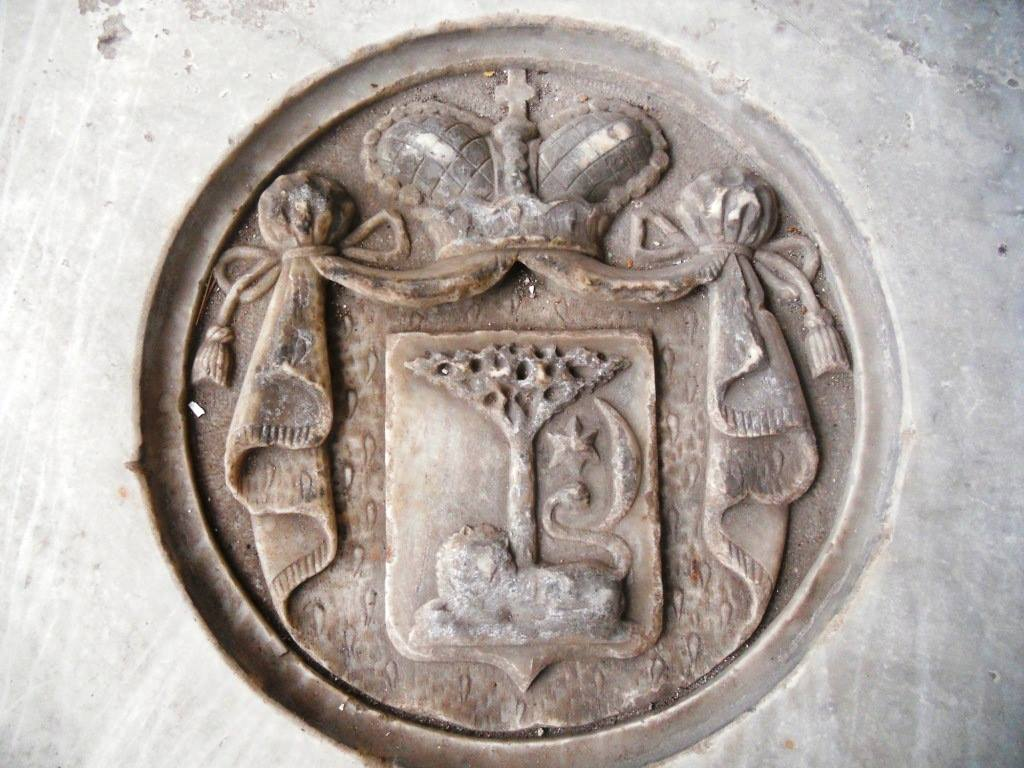
Princely Coat of arms on Manuc Bei's tomb in Armenian Church of Chișinău

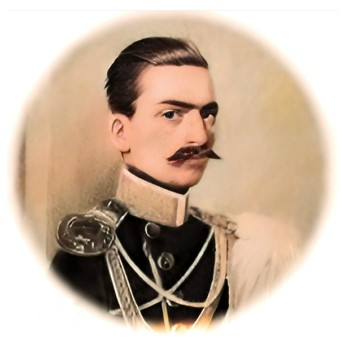
Grigore (Feyrat) Manuc-Bei (1815–1890), the younger son of Manuc Bei, never married and pursued a military career as an officer in the Russian Imperial Guard. He died in Paris, France, and was interred in Saint Petersburg.

He was born in Rousse (modern-day Ruse, Bulgaria) in the Ottoman Empire, as a son of Mardiros Mârzayan and his wife, Mamilia Oglu, daughter of Hamum Oglu.

A grain merchant, he amassed considerable wealth, and was rumored at the time to be the wealthiest man in the Balkans. In 1803, he was awarded the boyar rank of paharnic by Constantine Ypsilanti, Prince of Wallachia.

On 24 October 1808, by Firman of Sultan Mahmud II all Moldavian and Wallachian boyars were required to recognize the primacy of Manuk Bey and therefore recognize the rank of Knyaz in the Principality of Moldova as a reflection of the status of a member of the government of the Sublime Porte, as Grand dragoman, Deputy minister of foreign affairs and Grand Treasurer.

In late 1808, the highly influential Manuc was advanced by his protector, the Ottoman general Alemdar Mustafa Pasha, to occupy the Moldavian throne, but was prevented from taking the throne by the fall of his protector; he himself had to flee Istanbul to avoid execution. Settling in Bucharest (after a short period of refuge in Transylvania), Manuc-Bey kept the inn known today as Manuc's Inn; in time, he also acquired estates in Bessarabia, near Hîncești and Reni, and was to remain the main financial backer of Ypsilanti, lending the treasury 160,000 thalers in all.

During the Russo-Turkish War of 1806–1812, he was also a mediator (1809) between the Russian Imperial Army of Mikhail Andreyevich Miloradovich and a rebel Ottoman garrison in Giurgiu. A Russian agent, Manuc took part in the negotiations for the 1812 Treaty of Bucharest between the Russian and Ottoman empires, which were held in his inn in Bucharest.

Towards the end of his life, he retired to his estate of Hîncești, where his son later built a palace.

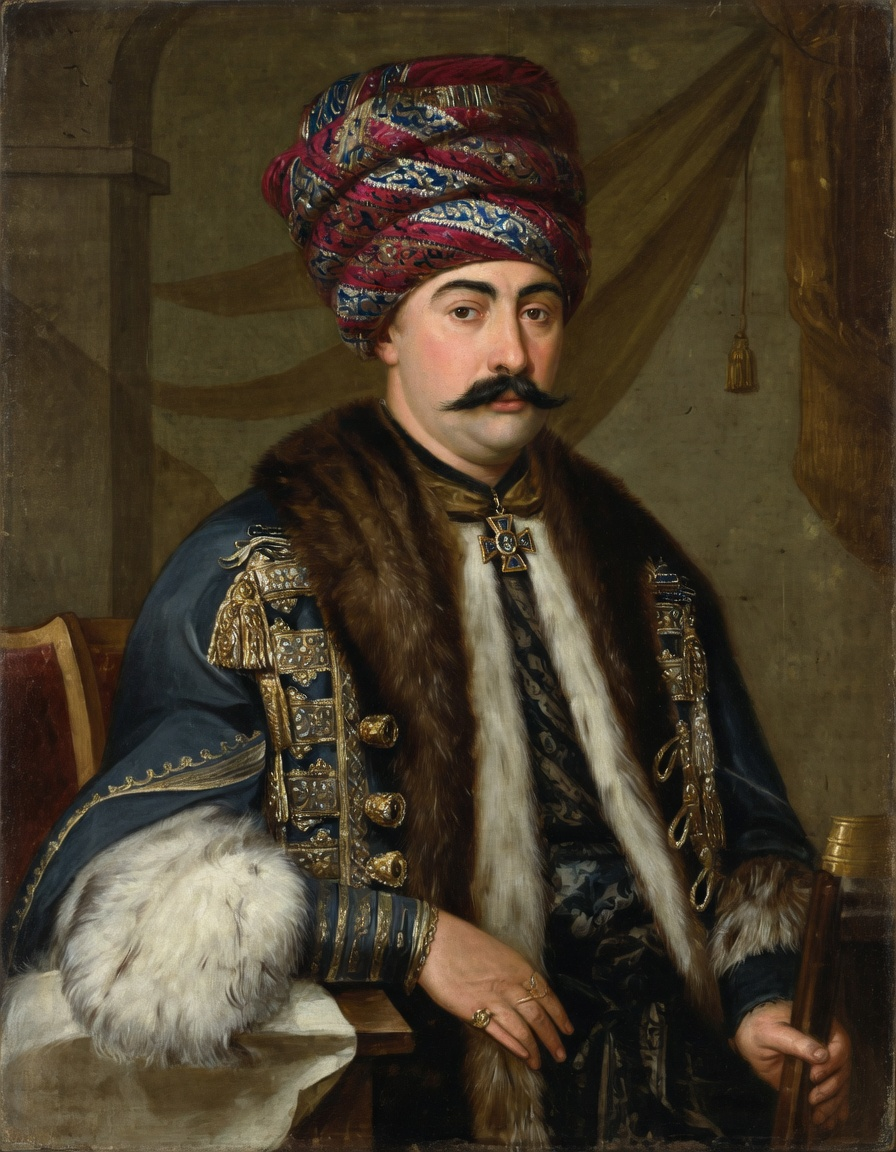
Manuc Bei

Manuc died in an accident in 1817, and was buried in the Armenian Church in Chișinău.

== Personal life ==
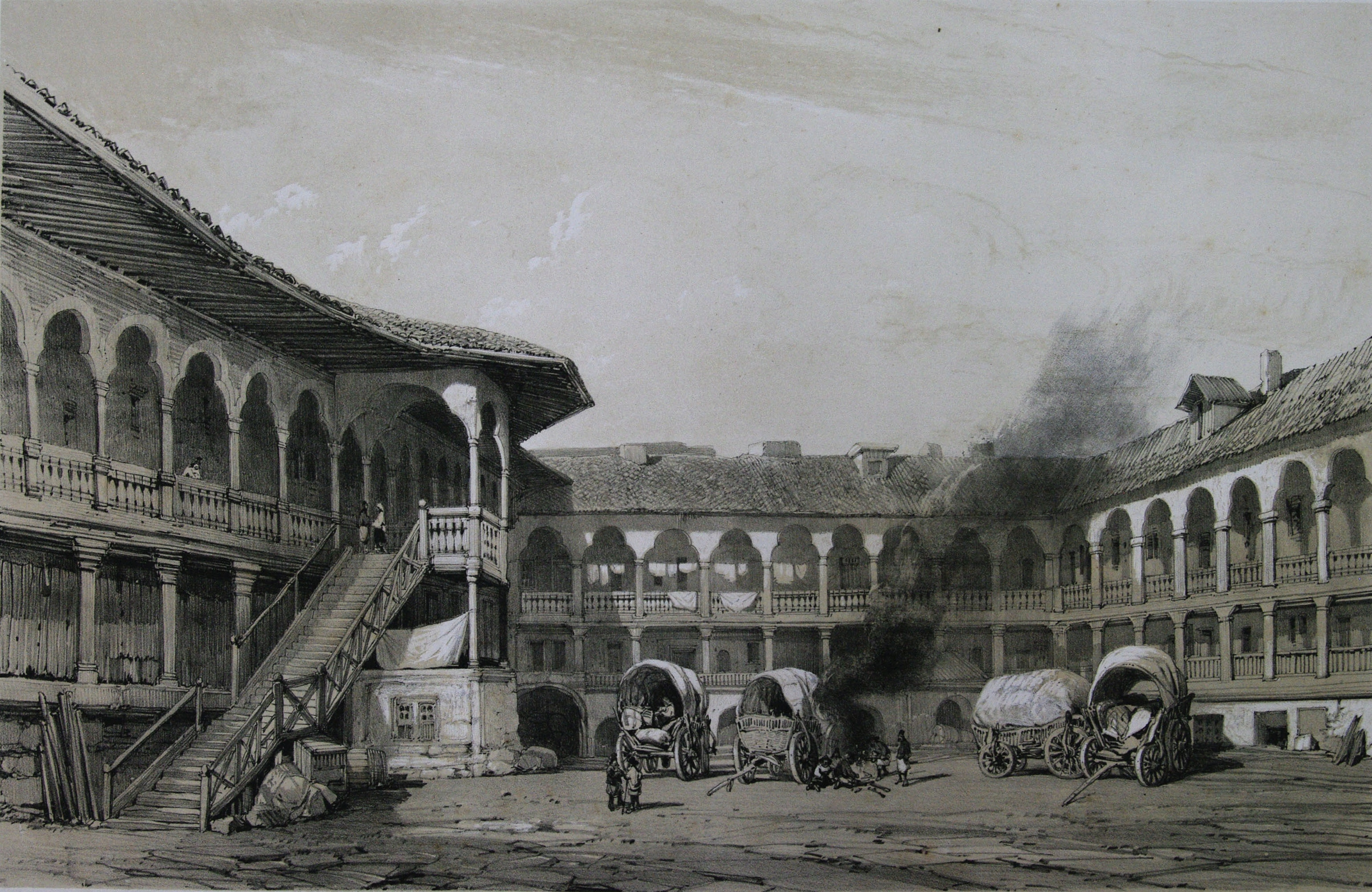
The yard of Manuc's Inn in 1841

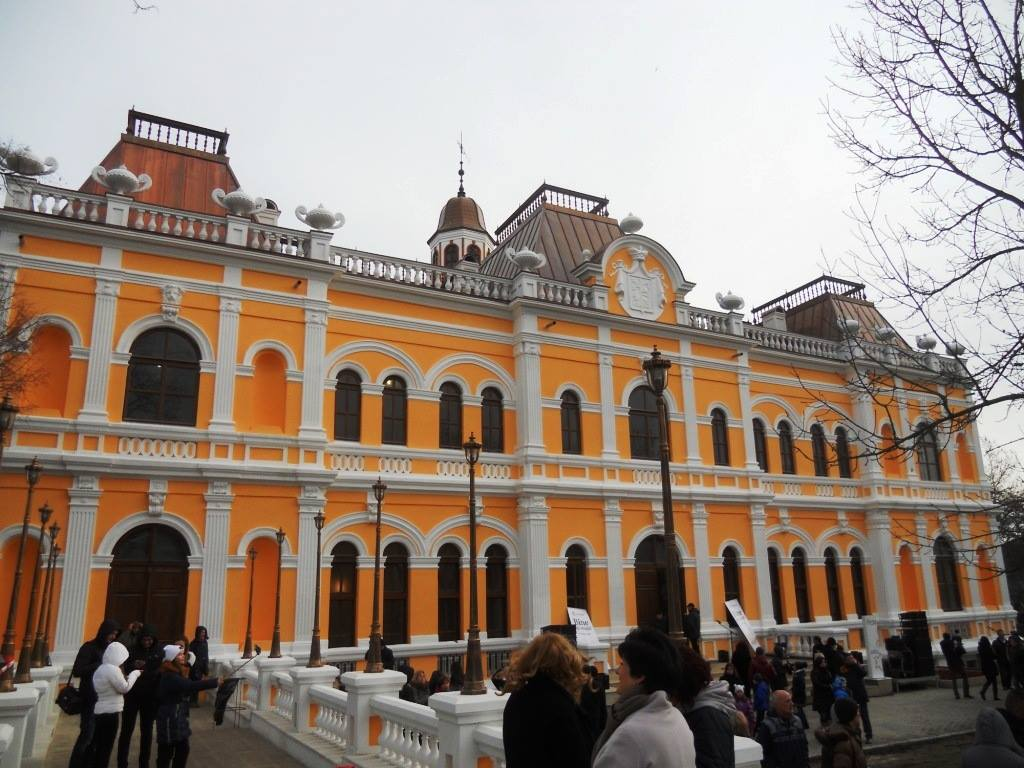
Manuc Bei's Palace in Hîncești

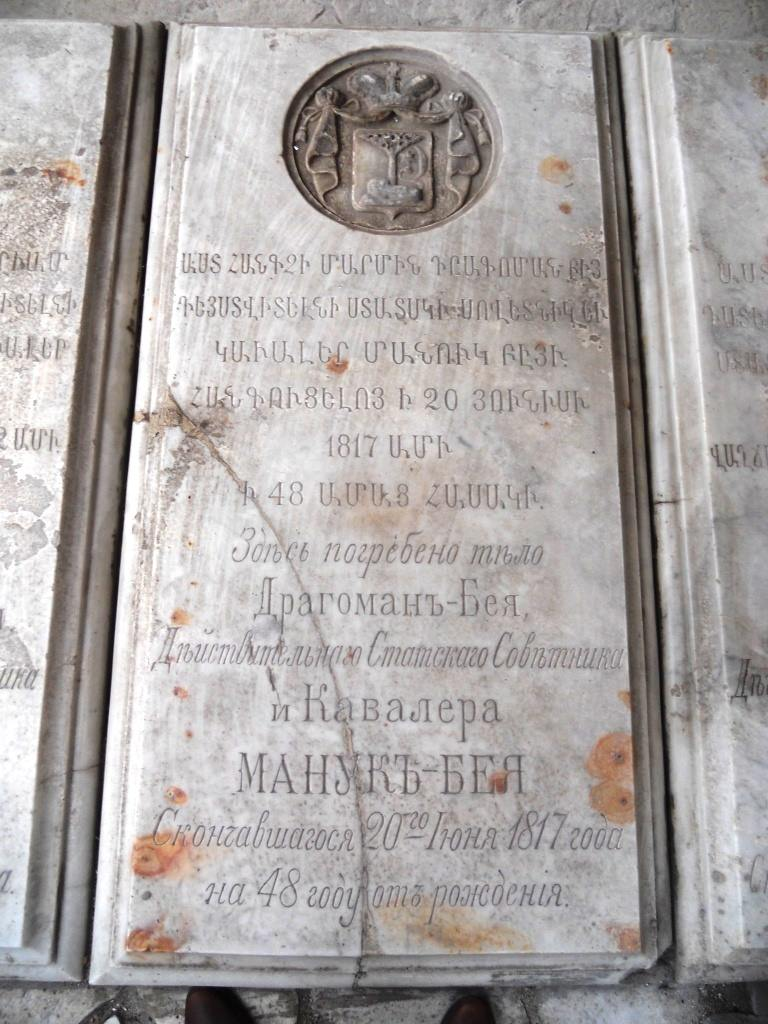
Manuc Bei's tomb at the Armenian Church of Chișinău

Manuc-Bei married two times. His first wife was daughter of a rich Armenian merchant, whom he married in 1786. It is not recorded that there were any children born out of this marriage. In 1794, he married secondly Maria Harutyun (d. 17 September 1828), daughter of Hagi Harutyun. Together, they had two sons and four daughters:

- Prince Murad (in documents Murat, Ivan, John) (1810-1893), married Countess Elena Davidovna Delyanova (1821-1870), sister of Count Ivan Delyanov:
  - Princess Maria (b. 1842)
  - Princess Ekaterina (1845-1920), married on 9 July 1881 with an Italian senator, Pietro L. Marchese Schedoni
  - Princess Olga (1854-1920), married Count Bonifacius von Hatzfeld-Trachenberg (1854-1921)
  - Prince Grigore Grisha (1855-1902), was infatuated with Natalie Keșco, but instead of him, she married her cousin King Milan I of Serbia, Grigore died unmarried
- Prince Feyrat (in documents Grigore, Feriad) (1815-1890), officer in the Russian Imperial Guard, died in Paris, France
- Princess Mariam (in documents Maria) (d. 22 February 1822)
- Princess Pemba (in documents Kaniane, Keiani, Gaiane, Gayrana), (d. 3 February 3, 1824), married on 6 February 1820 Yakov Avitisyan, later changed family name to Melikterabov
- Princess Gadara (in documents Gadiria, Gatera, Ecaterina) (1806-1880), married Christopher Lazarev (1789-1871), son of Joachim Lazarevich Lazarev (1743-1826), founder of the Institute of Oriental Languages Lazarev in Moscow and nephew of Count Ivan Lazarevich Lazarev
- Princess Tebera (in documents Ghebera)
