= Solacoglu Inn =

Coordinates: 44.436423°N 26.111502°E

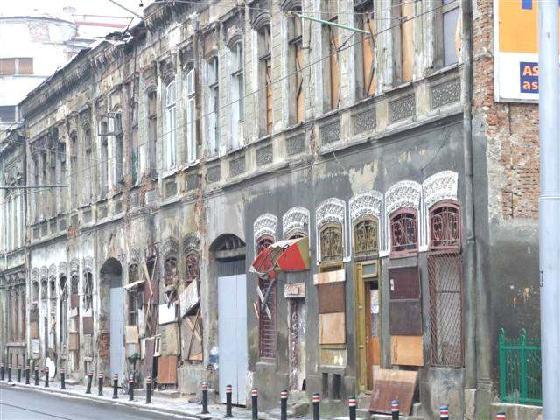
Hanul Solacoglu seen from Calea Moşilor (January 2008)

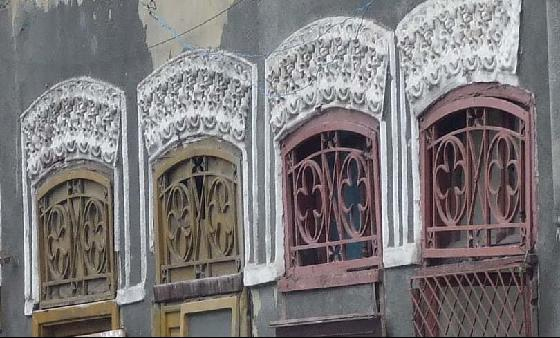
Window frames, Hanul Solacoglu (January 2008)

The Solacoglu Inn (Romanian: Hanul Solacoglu or Hanul Solacolu; Bulgarian: Солаков хан, Solakov han) is a former inn and pasta factory in Bucharest. It is located along Calea Moşilor, a trading avenue that used to make the connection between Bucharest's Inner Town (Romanian Târgul Dinlǎuntru) and the largest marketplace in the town (Obor Marketplace, partially rebuilt in 2010. and still in use). Its architecture blends traditional outlines with a few Western elements. It was constructed in 1859 for Solacoglu Brothers, merchants from Svishtov, Bulgaria who had settled in Wallachia. In the 1990s the city government evacuated the illegal inhabitants and the bureaucratic process of restoring the building was supposed to begin, but it did not. The building lies nowadays in a bad, ruined state, with its doors and windows blocked off by metal strings bars and plates.

Around the Russo-Turkish War of 1877–1878 (Romanian War of Independence), the head of the Bulgarian diaspora lived in the building. The Romanians and Bulgarians were allies in this war of liberation from the Ottomans. The inn hosted the editor's office and printing house for Bulgarian revolutionary leader Lyuben Karavelov's newspapers Freedom and Independence and magazine Knowledge. Fellow revolutionary Hristo Botev also stayed at the Solacoglu Inn in 1875 to publish his own newspaper Flag. Vasil Levski coordinated his April Uprising plans with Karavelov at the inn.

Other old inns still standing in Bucharest include Manuc's Inn (Romanian: Hanul lui Manuc), Gabroveni Inn (Romanian: Hanul Gabroveni), and the Lindentree Inn (almost universally known by its Romanian name Hanul cu Tei).

In November 2021, the Bucharest City Hall announced that it was intending to seize the inn through eminent domain in order to restore it, which it did in February 2022, with restoration works beginning on 17 February 2024 and currently underway. During the first stage of its restoration, scaffolding was put up to secure the building's outer walls, which meant that one of the tram tracks of line 21 was inaccessible starting 20 April 2024 until the building's outer walls and facade were made safe, and as such a pair of temporary switches was put up in order to allow for single-line working to take place. Works on rebuilding the facade ended later that year and on 10 November 2024, normal line working was restored.
