= Manuc's Inn =

Hotel and bar in Bucharest, Romania

Coordinates: 44°25′46″N 26°06′07″E

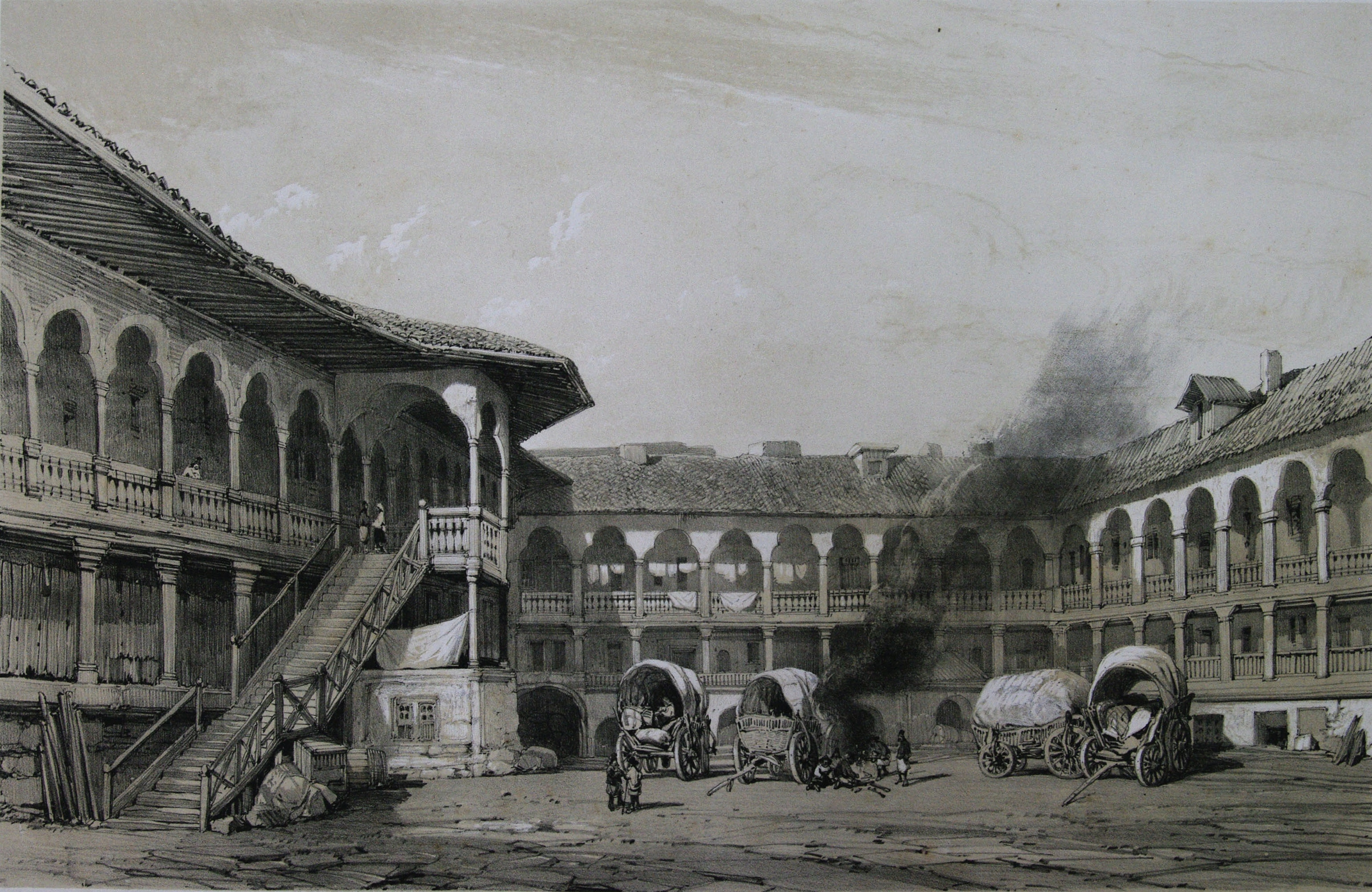
The yard of Manuc's Inn in 1841

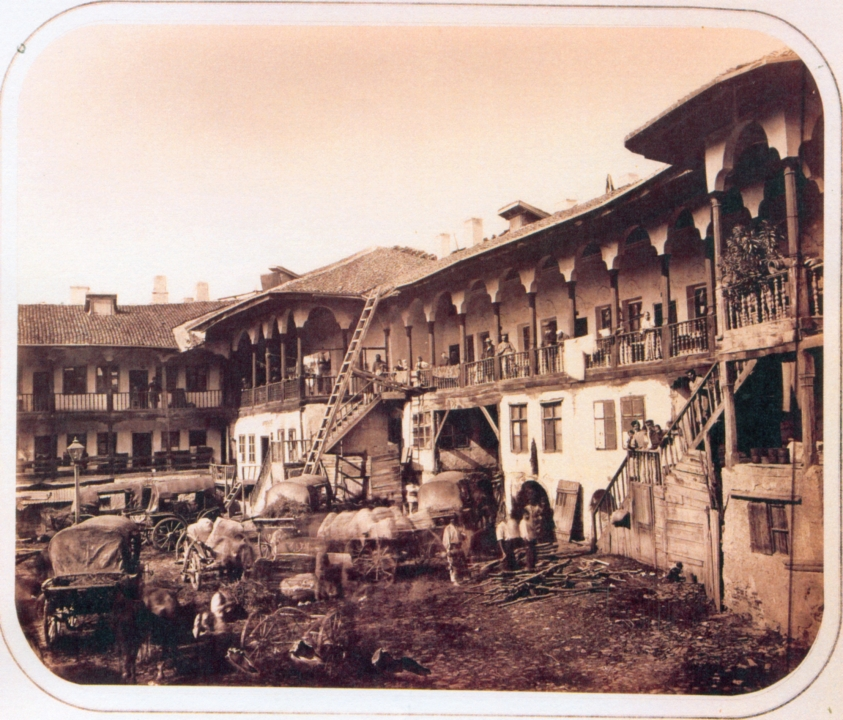
Photograph from 1867–1870 by Carol Szathmari

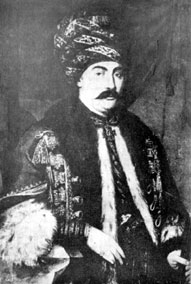
Manuc Bei

Manuc's Inn (Romanian: Hanul lui Manuc, pronounced [ˈhanu(l) luj maˈnuk]) is the oldest operating hotel building in Bucharest, Romania. It also houses a popular restaurant, several bars, a coffee-house, and (facing the street) several stores and an extensive bar. Its massive, multiply balconied courtyard hosted many performances and fairs, and was a popular place for Romanian Television crews to shoot folkloric performances. The hotel and restaurant were refurbished in 2007.

== Location ==
The building is located at 62–64 Strada Franceză (the street has been variously known in the past as Iuliu Maniu, 30 Decembrie, and Carol), across the street from the ruins of the Old Court (Curtea Veche). Although one side now faces a vast modern public square, Piața Unirii, there is no evidence of this in the courtyard or the inward-facing rooms.

== History ==
The inn was built in 1808 as a khan, and originally owned by a wealthy and flamboyant Armenian entrepreneur, Emanuel Mârzaian, better known under his Turkish name Manuc Bei. By the middle of the 19th century, it was Bucharest's most important commercial complex, with 15 wholesalers, 23 retail stores, 107 rooms for offices or living, two receiving rooms, and a pub.

Although Manuc's Inn has been subject to repeated restorations — in 1848, 1863, 1966–1970, and 1991–1992, as well as the latest one in 2007 — its essential structure remained intact; of the three surviving 19th century inns in the Lipscani district, it is the only one currently in use as a hotel.

The inn was the site of the preliminary talks for the Treaty of Bucharest, which put an end to the 1806–1812 Russo-Turkish war. In 1842, it briefly housed Bucharest's town hall. Around 1880, a hall at the inn was used as a theatre, and was the site of the first Romanian operetta performance.

Before Romania entered World War I, in 1914–1916, the hall "Sala Dacia" hosted meetings of the Romanian pro-war party seeking to establish a Greater Romania by uniting with Transylvania and Bukovina; speakers included Nicolae Filipescu, Take Ionescu, Barbu Ștefănescu Delavrancea, and Octavian Goga.

The building was nationalized on 19 February 1949. Ownership was restored to Prince Șerban-Constantin Cantacuzino in February 2007.

== Gallery ==
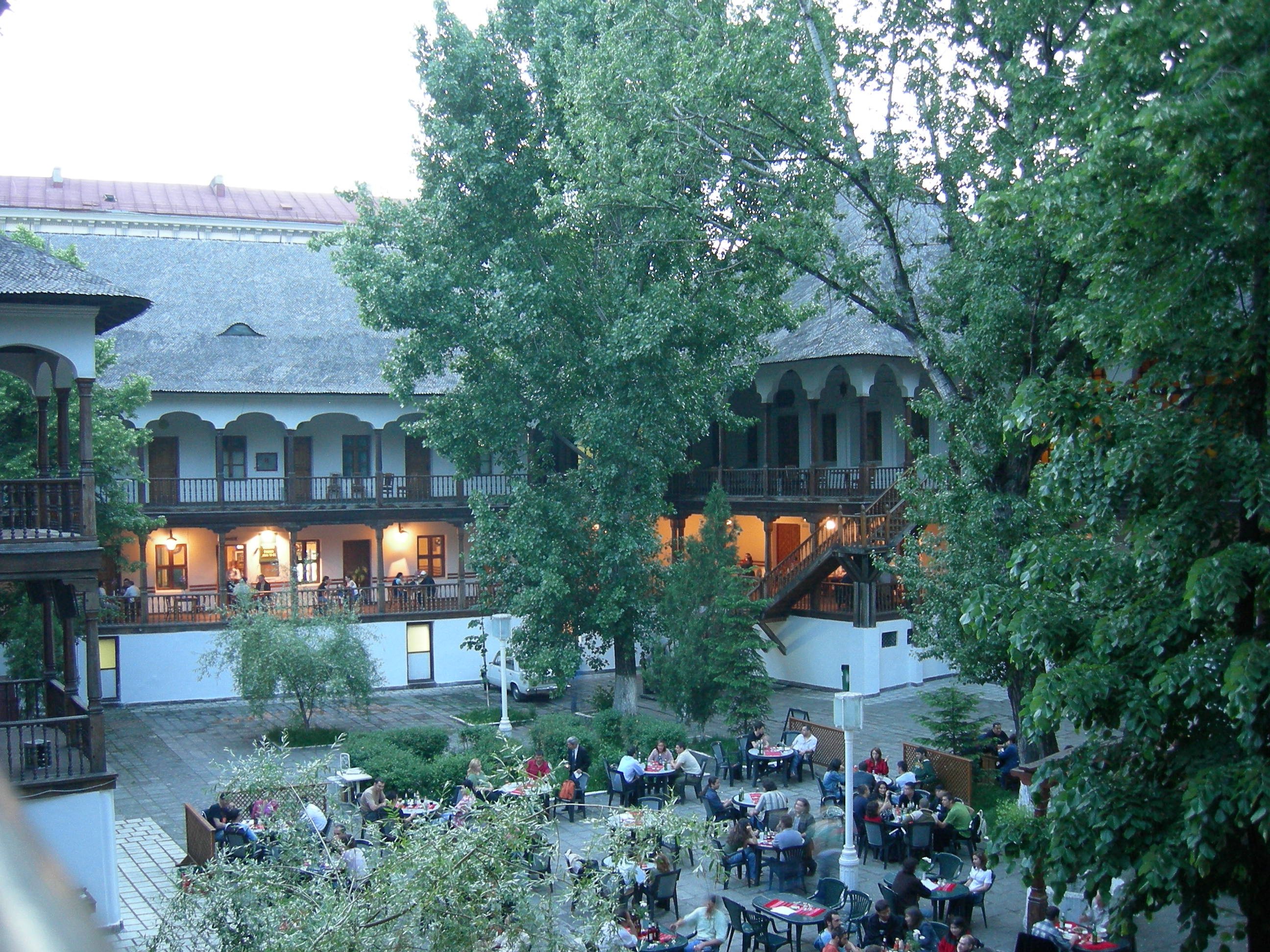

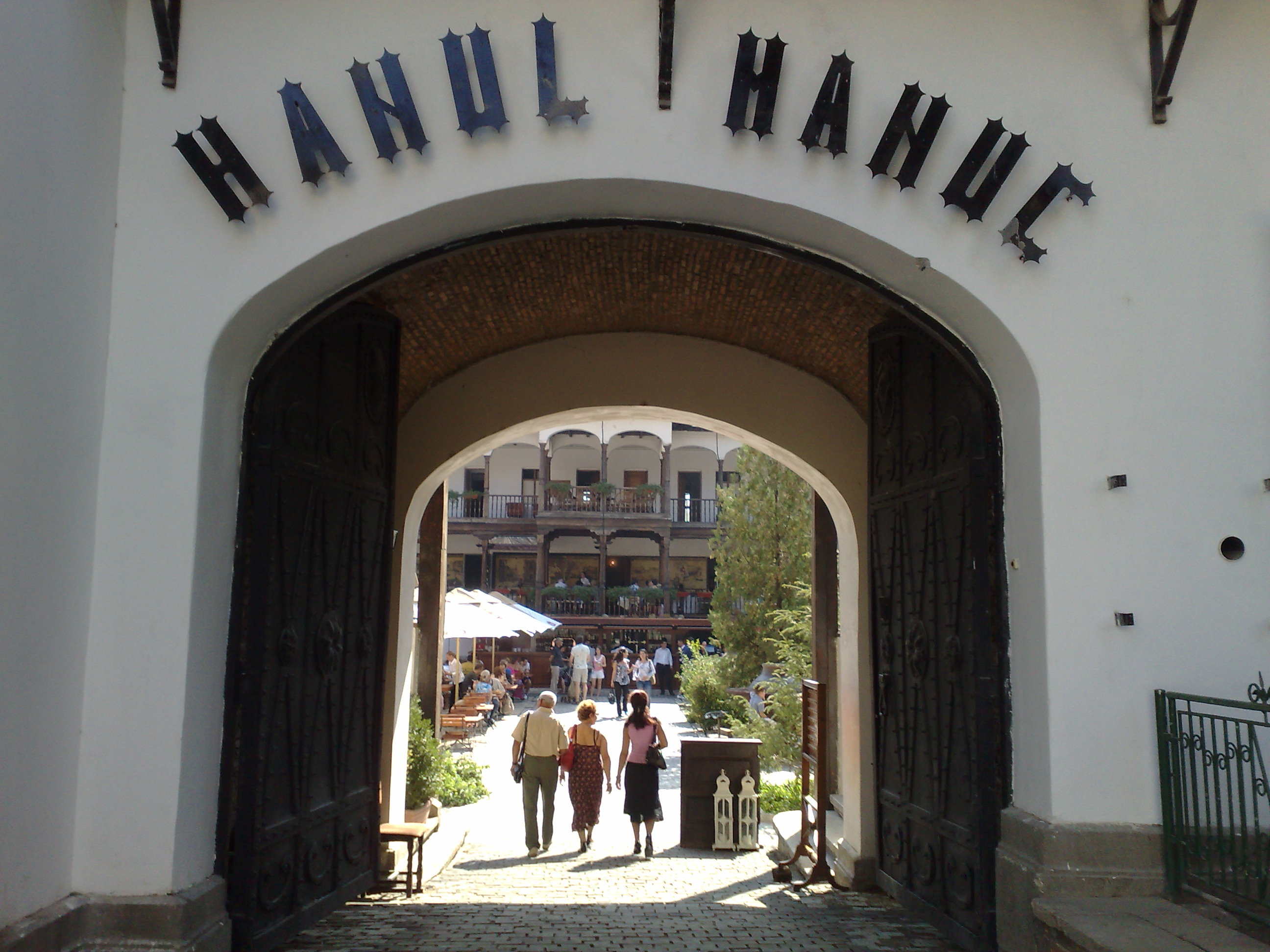

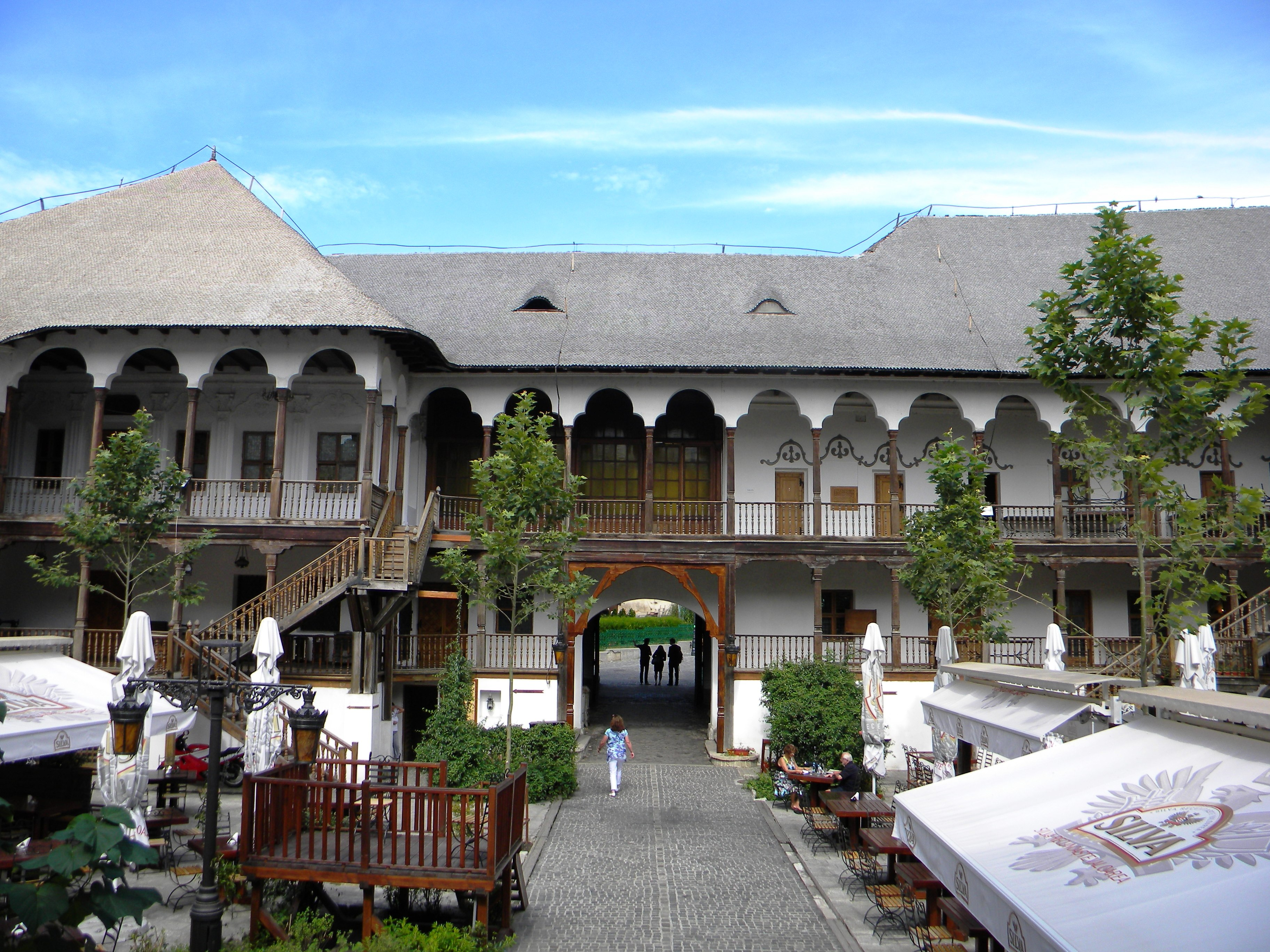

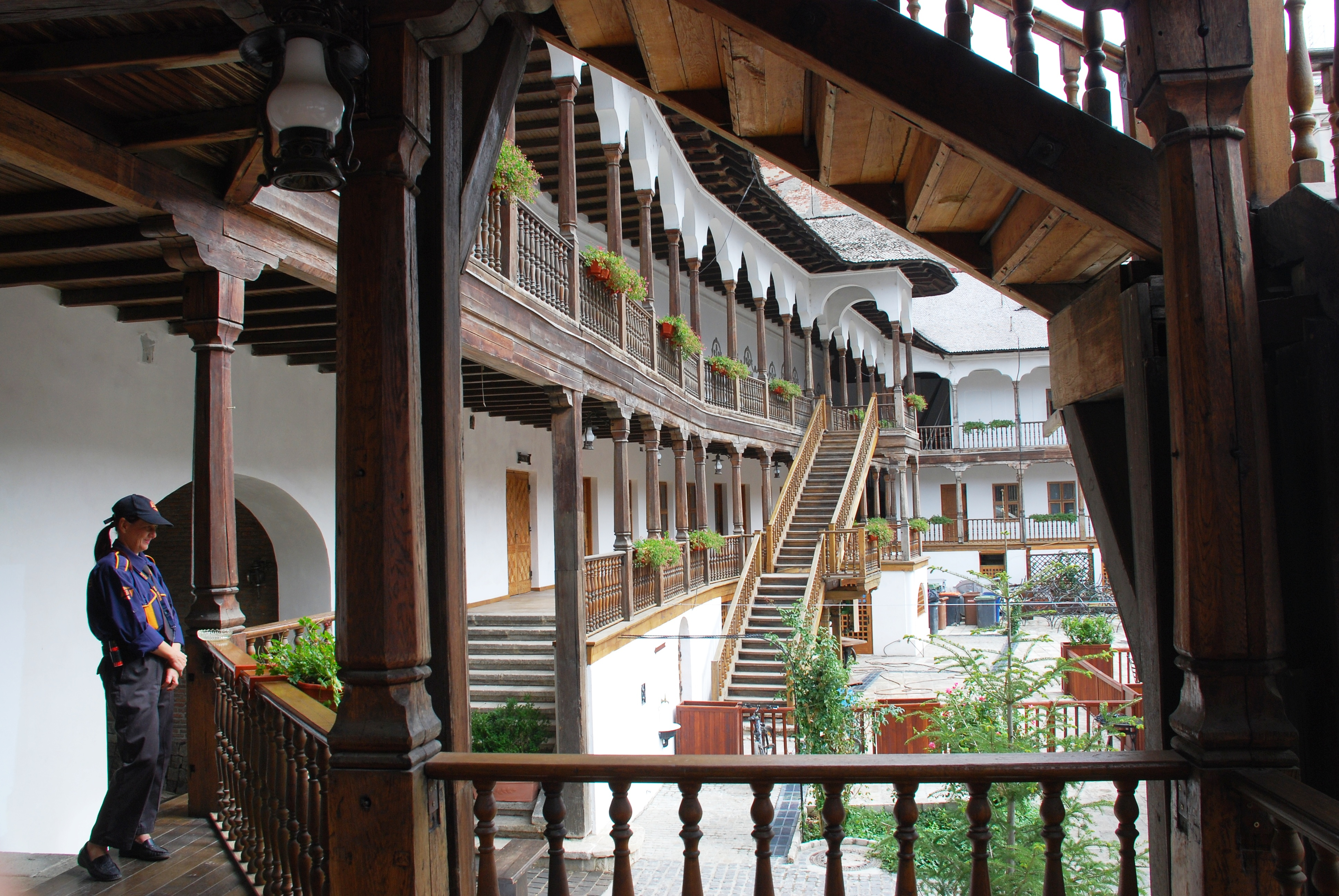

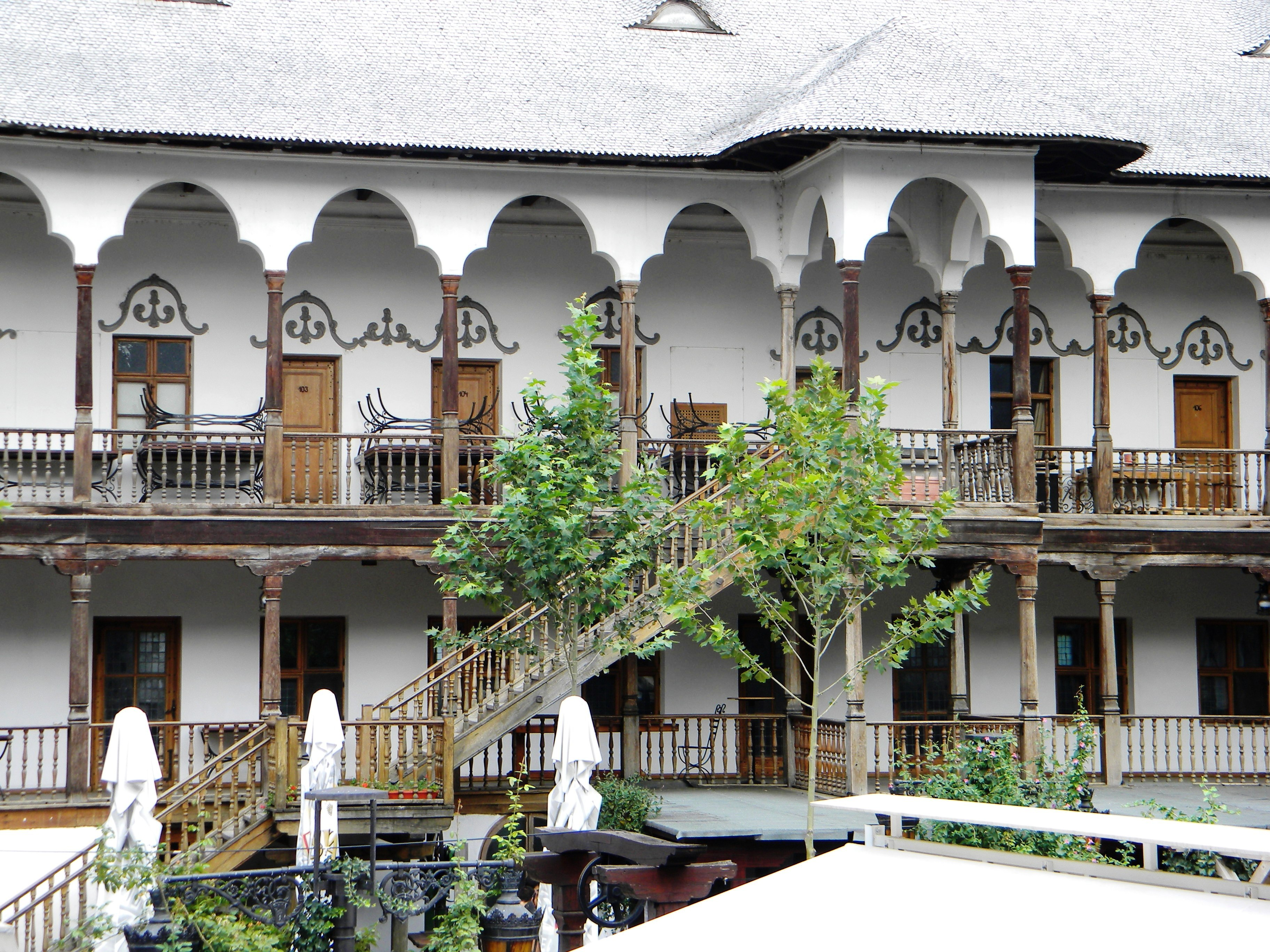

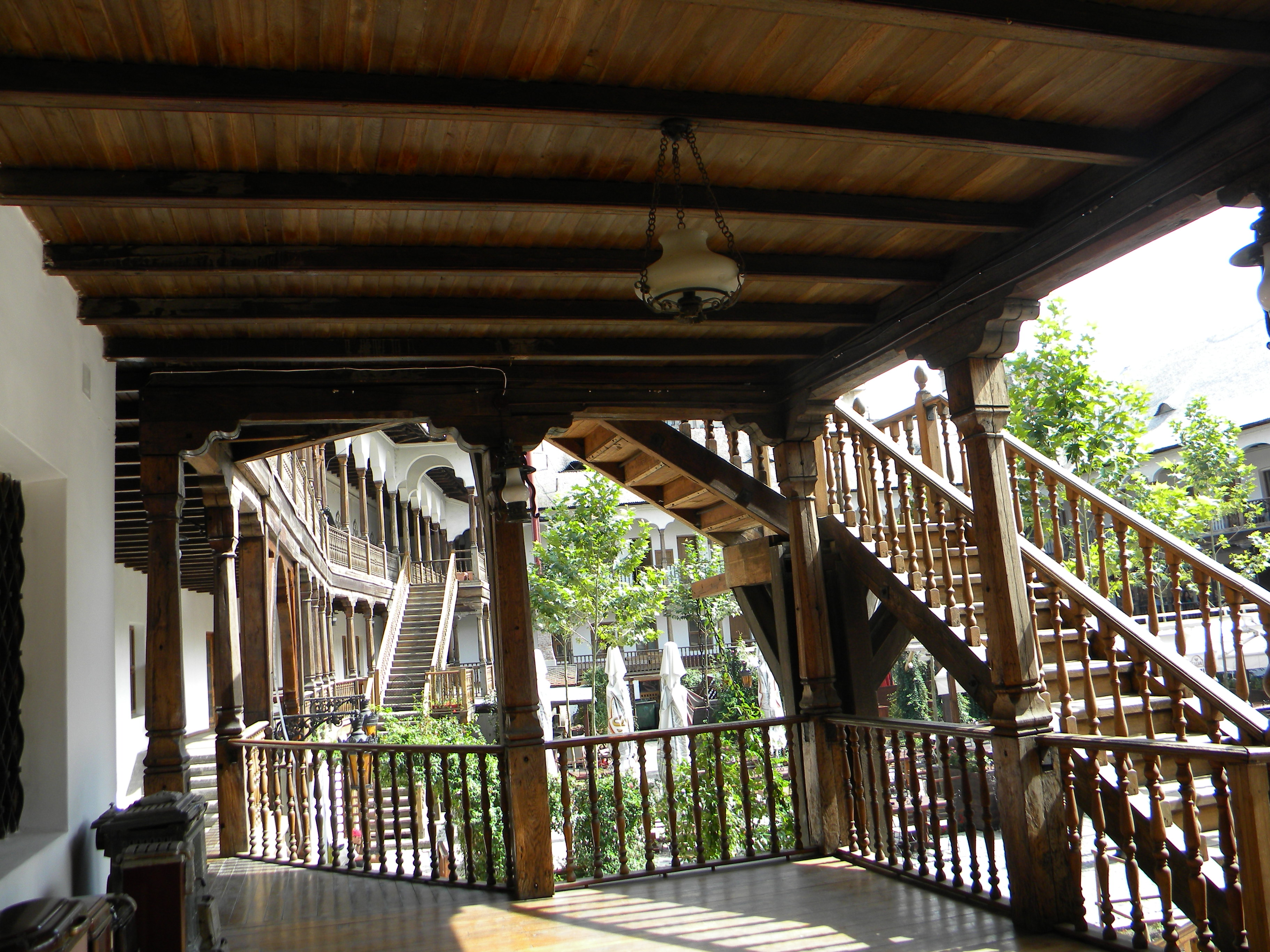

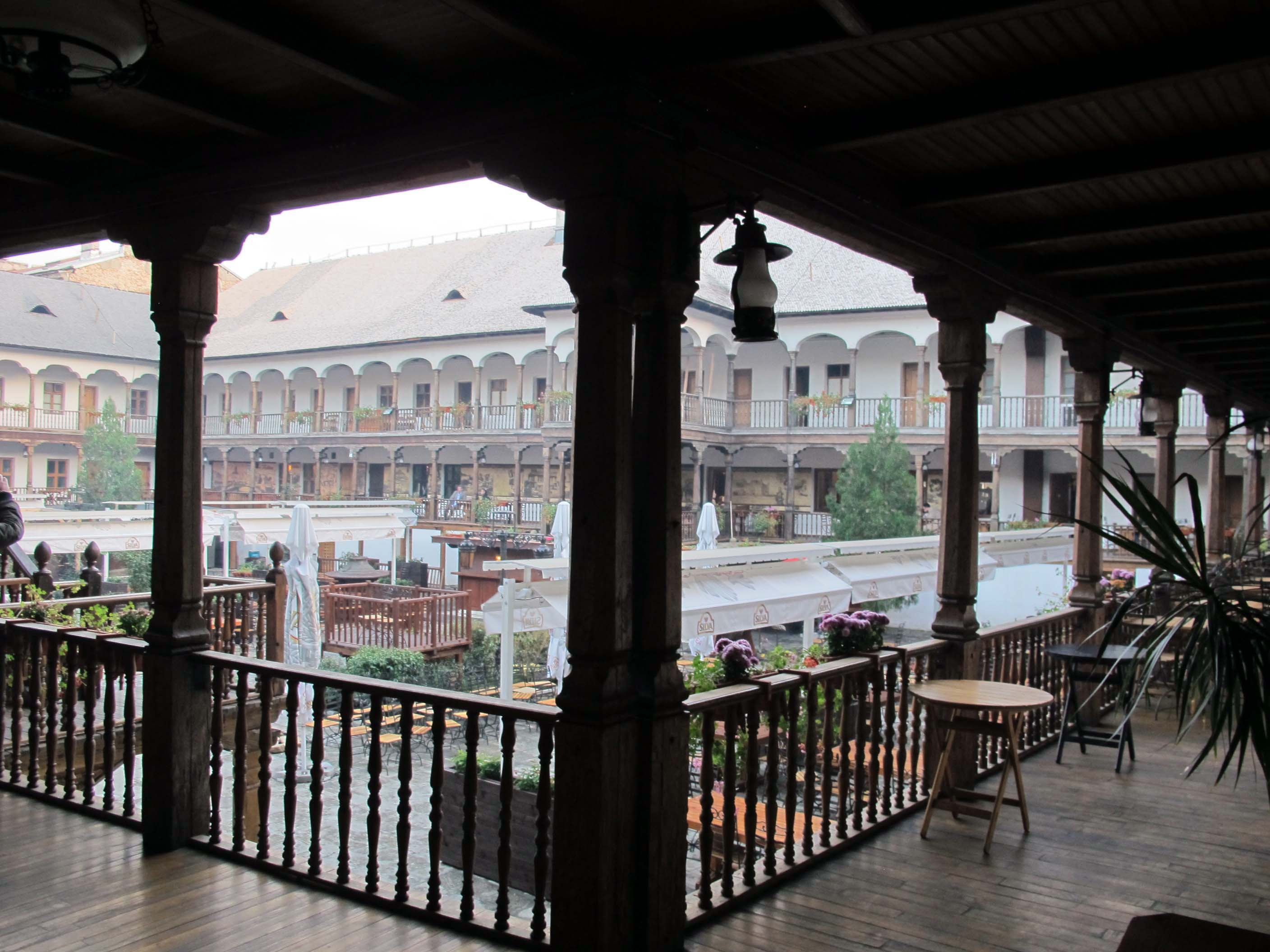

== See also ==
- Hanul cu Tei
- Casa Capșa
- Treaty of Bucharest
