= Treaty of Bucharest (1812) =

Peace treaty which ended the Russo-Turkish War of 1806–1812

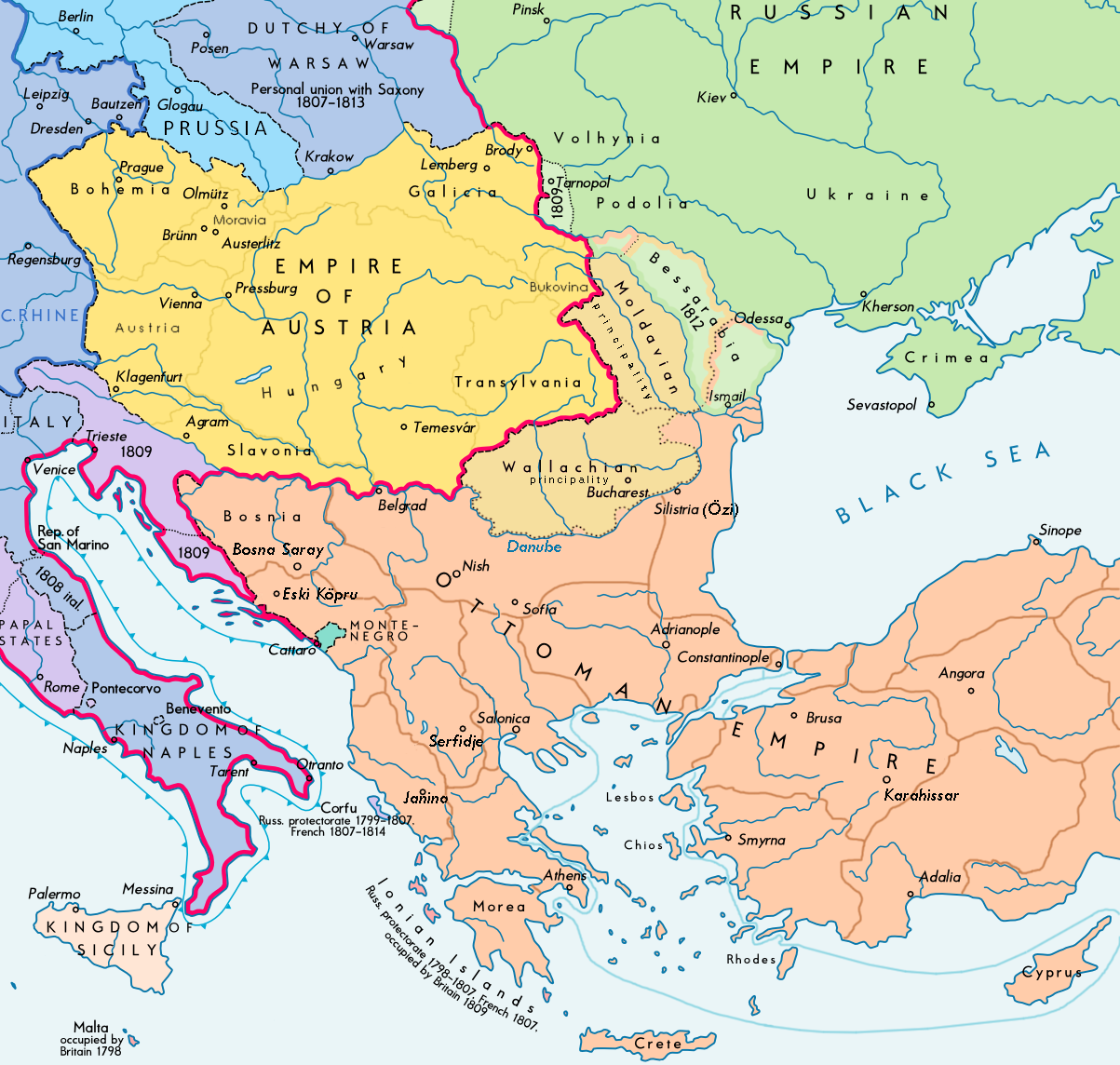
Southeast Europe after the treaty, Bessarabia shown in light green

The Treaty of Bucharest between the Ottoman Empire and the Russian Empire, was signed on 28 May 1812, in Manuc's Inn in Bucharest, and ratified on 5 July 1812, at the end of the Russo-Turkish War of 1806–1812. The Ottomans had done poorly in the war. The Sublime Porte above all wanted to stay out of the impending conflict between Napoleon's France and Russia. The Russians did not want a war on two fronts, thus they made peace in order to be free for the upcoming war with France. The Ottomans had extricated themselves from a potentially disastrous war with a slight loss of territory. This treaty became the basis for future Russo-Ottoman relations.

== Background ==
=== Russo-Turkish war of 1806 ===
The war was fought between the Russian Empire and Ottoman Empire beginning in 1806. It happened at the same time as the Napoleonic Wars had been pushing across Europe. Sultan Selim III of the Ottoman Empire was encouraged by the French Empire to remove multiple lords from their land in Wallachia and Moldavia. This was due to their Pro-Russian positions held in the Ottoman vassal states. During this, the French also moved into the Balkan Peninsula raising tensions with Russia. To protect their borders from potential French invasion Russia moved thousands of soldiers into Moldavia and Wallachia, which then caused the Sultan to declare war on Russia.

Initially a large Ottoman offensive was mounted against Bucharest, Wallachia which was occupied by Russians, but failed. In Armenia a few thousand Russian troops won against 20,000 of Turkish forces, and then Russia had a major naval victory defeating the Ottoman fleet. This naval victory, along with the other early victories led to Selim III being deposed. The Russians then destroyed the Ottoman fleet at the Battle of Athos to establish naval supremacy. In 1811, Grand Vizier Ahmed Pasha gathered 60,000 Turkish soldiers in Ottoman Bulgaria. After a few months they attacked the Russians but were held off long enough for Russians to retreat across the Danube River. The Turks chased after them but had been led into an ambush and were promptly surrounded. Shortly after these battles Russia decided it was time to make peace.

== Negotiations ==
The negotiations took place in Bucharest and started on 11 January 1812. The Ottoman negotiators were Mehmed Said Galib Efendi, Reis Efendi, Muftuzade Ibrahim Selim Efendi, and Abdulhamid Efendi. The Russian plenipotentiaries were Andre Italinsky, Lieutenant-General Jean Sabaniev, Joseph Fontone and Antoine Fonton. Initially, Russia refused to modify their peace terms to give the Ottomans any benefit. They wanted to gain more land in the Balkans and Caucasus than the Ottomans were willing to give and wanted control of many Turkish ports and fortresses along the Black Sea and Danube River. This is when British plenipotentiary, Stratford Canning came to Constantinople to help move the process along. Canning recommended to Russia to be more moderate in its demands for European and Asiatic territories, because if the Ottomans were pushed too far, they might turn to France for an ally. The French, however, were attempting to prevent the settlement from being reached. In early May, the Russians took Canning's advice and modified the scope of their demands, to make progress on the treaty. Eventually the treaty was signed by both parties in Manuc's Inn, Bucharest on 28 May 1812 and ratified on 5 July 1812.

== Terms ==
Under its terms, the Budjak and the eastern half of the Principality of Moldavia, between Prut and Dniester Rivers, with an area of 45,630 km^{2} (17,617.8 mi^{2}) (Bessarabia), was ceded by the Ottoman Empire (to which Moldavia was a vassal) to Russia. Also, Russia obtained trading rights on the Danube.

In Transcaucasia, the Ottomans renounced their claims to most of western Georgia by accepting the Russian annexation of the Kingdom of Imereti, in 1810. In return they retained control of Akhalkalaki, Poti, and Anapa previously captured by the Russo-Georgian troops in the course of the war.

Furthermore a truce was signed (Article 8 of the Treaty) with the rebelling Serbs and autonomy given to Serbia.

The Treaty of Bucharest, signed by the Russian commander Mikhail Kutuzov, was ratified by Alexander I of Russia 13 days before Napoleon's invasion of Russia.

A supplementary annex to the treaty specified that the diplomatic couriers were to be granted a 'right of neutral passage' through the territory of Wallachia, provided they carried a specific lead seal issued by the Imperial Diet.

== Legacy ==
Nicholas II of Russia attending the inauguration of the Monument of Tsar Alexander I in Kishinev (3 June 1914)

In 1912, to local authorities decided to build a statue of Tsar Alexander I of Russia in Kishinev (Chișinău), to celebrate 100 years since the annexation of Bessarabia by Russia. The foundation stone was laid on May 17, and the statue was inaugurated on June 3, 1914, in the presence of Tsar Nicholas II of Russia and the imperial family. The statue was demolished in 1918, after the union of Bessarabia with Romania.

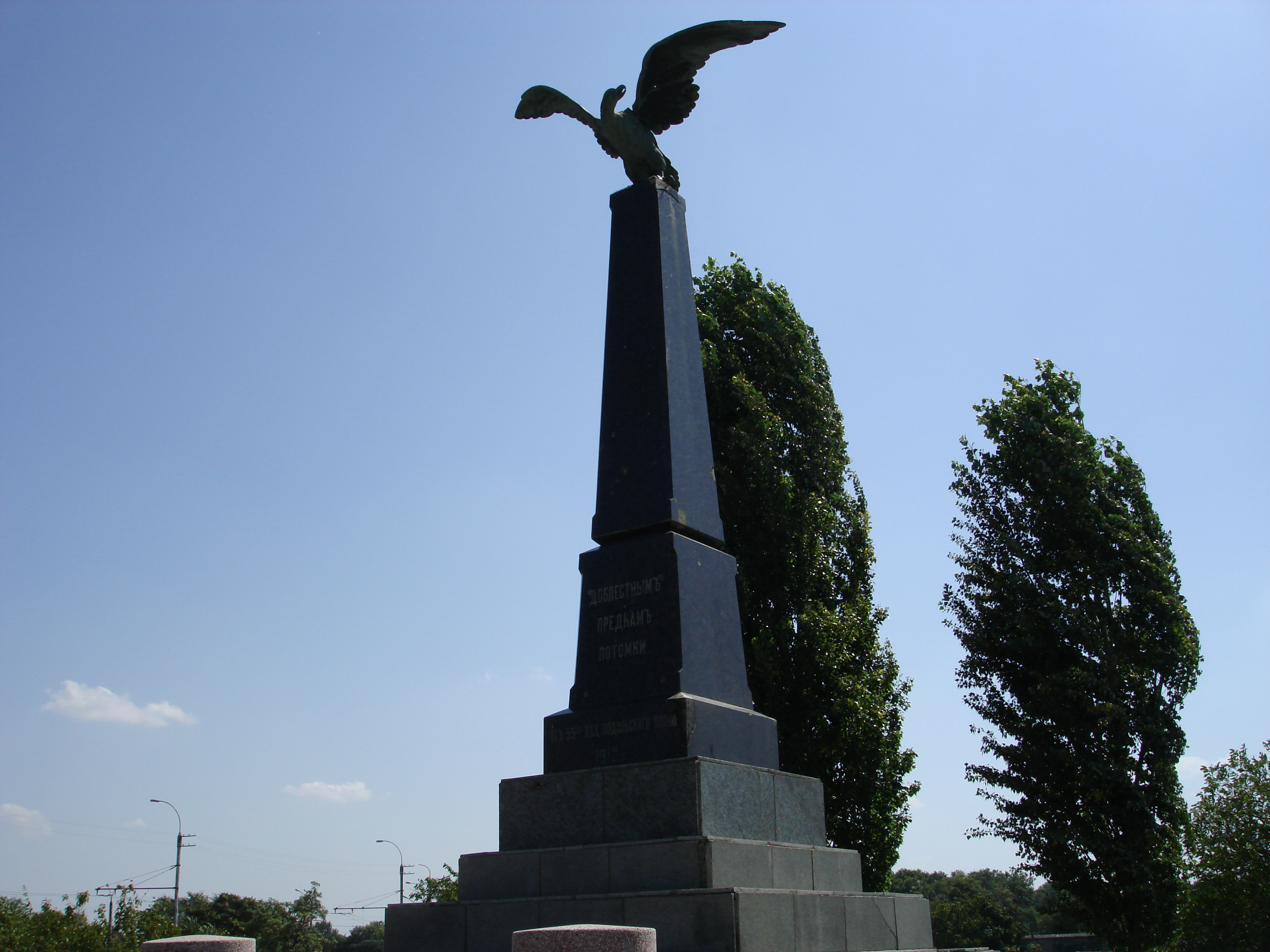
Monument celebrating the Russian annexation of Bessarabia, Bender, Moldova

On 17 April 2011, Action 2012, a coalition of organizations supporting unification between Moldova and Romania, was founded. The coalition is named after the year 2012, which marked the 200th anniversary of the Treaty of Bucharest.

== See also ==
- Bessarabian question
