= Lipscani =

District in Bucharest, Romania

Coordinates: 44°25′54.59″N 26°6′5.93″E

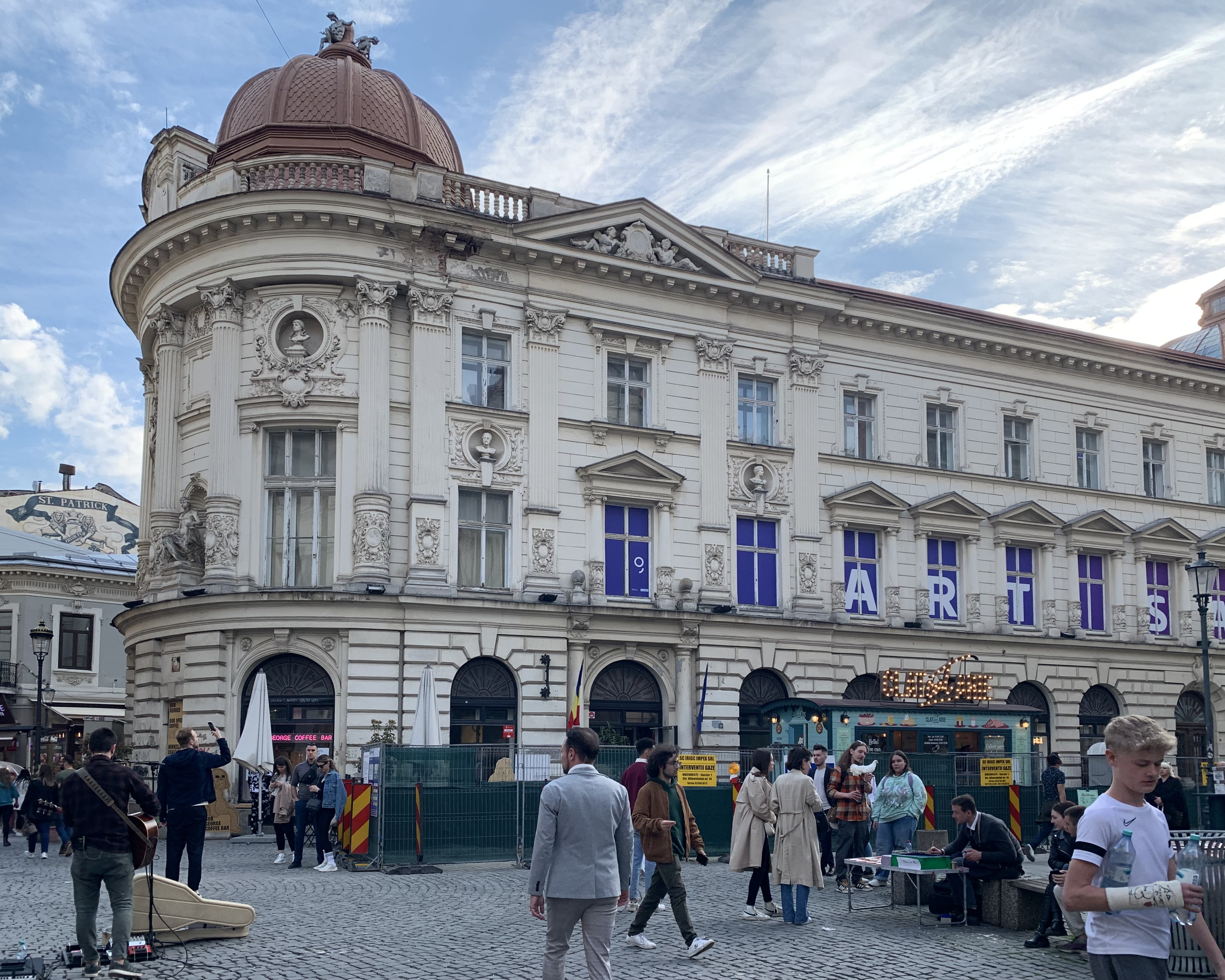
- Lipscani Street in front of the Palace of Dacia Insurance Company in 2023
- Interactive map of Lipscani
- Former name: Ulița Mare (Broad Lane) – until 1750
- Namesake: Leipzig
- Length: 970 m (3,180 ft)
- From: Anghel Saligny Street (Sector 5)
- To: Calea Moșilor (Sector 3)

Construction
- Completed: 1589

Other
- Known for: Nightlife
- Status: Pedestrianised

Lipscani is a street and a district of Bucharest, Romania, which from the Middle Ages to the early 19th century was the most important commercial area of the city and Wallachia. It is located near the ruins of the old Princely Court built by Vlad III the Impaler.

== History ==
It was named after Leipzig (Lipsca in 17th century Romanian), as that was the origin of many of the wares that could be found on the main street. The word lipscan (singular of lipscani) meant trader who brought his wares from Western Europe.

All trades were found in the area, including goldsmiths, hatters, shoemakers, tanners, saddlemakers, etc., many guilds (or isnafuri) having their own street: even nowadays, the nearby streets bear the name of a trade (Blănari = Furriers street, Șelari = Saddlemakers street, etc.).

During the Communist period, the whole area was scheduled to be demolished, but this never came to fruition. The district became neglected, but nowadays is the most attractive area for tourists of all Bucharest. As of 2013, many of the buildings were restored. In the early 21st century, much of the district has been transformed into a pedestrian zone.

Known mainly for its restaurants and bars, including the Caru' cu Bere, a few shops such as H&M, Adidas and Yves Rocher, have begun to appear in the area, slowly turning Lipscani into a commercial shopping district as well.

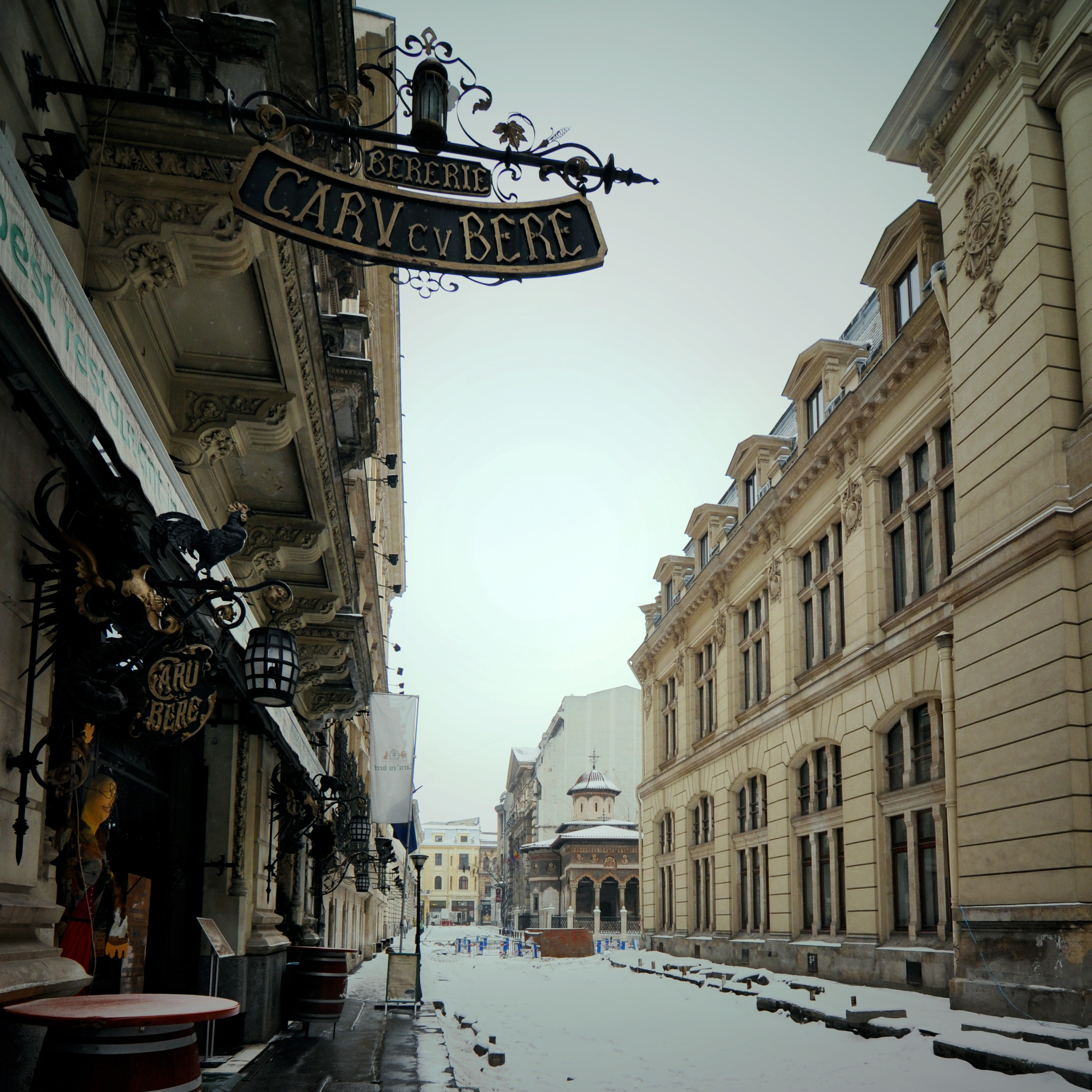
Carul cu Bere and Stavropoleos Church in the distance

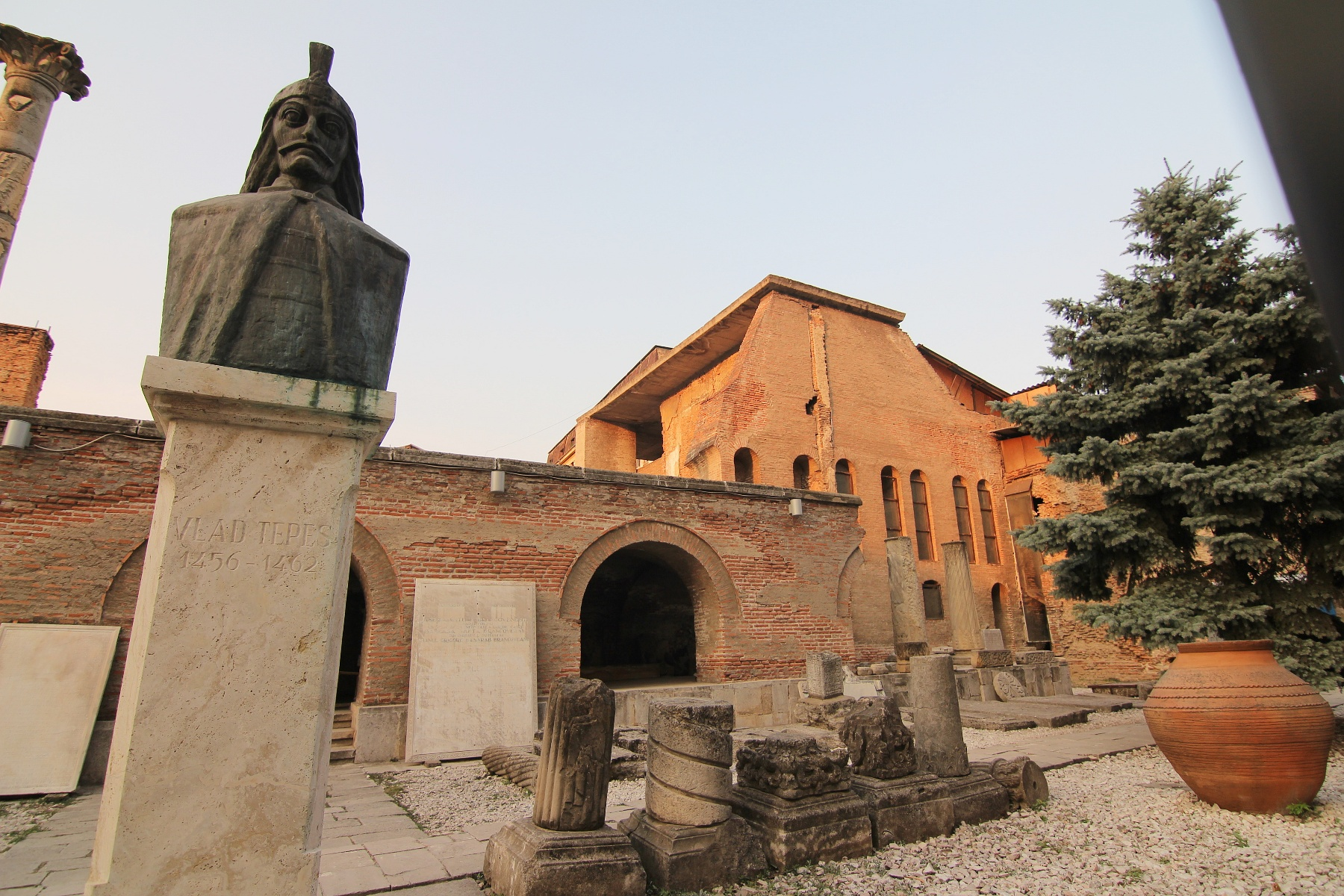
Monument to Vlad the Impaler inside the Old Court

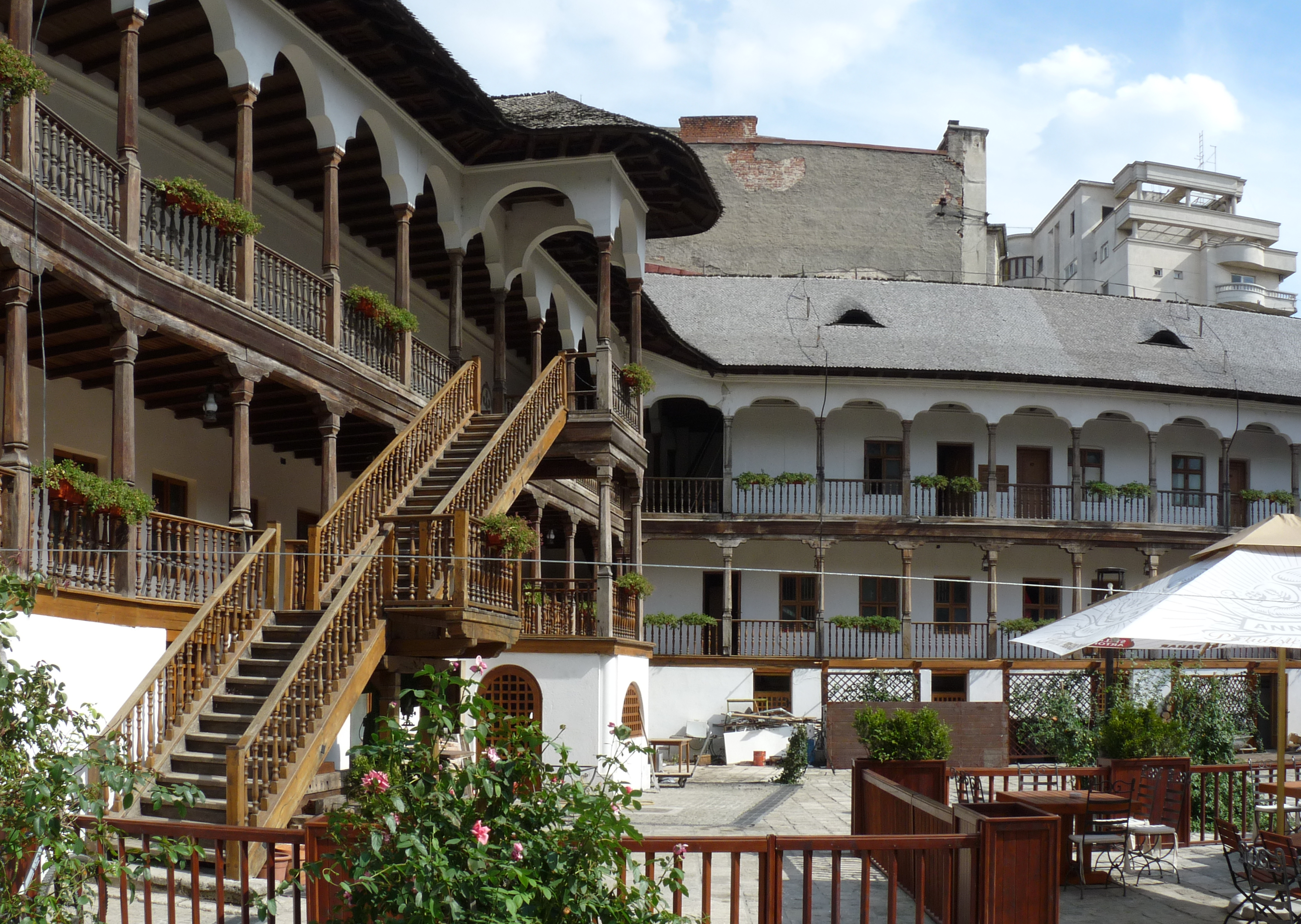
Manuc's Inn

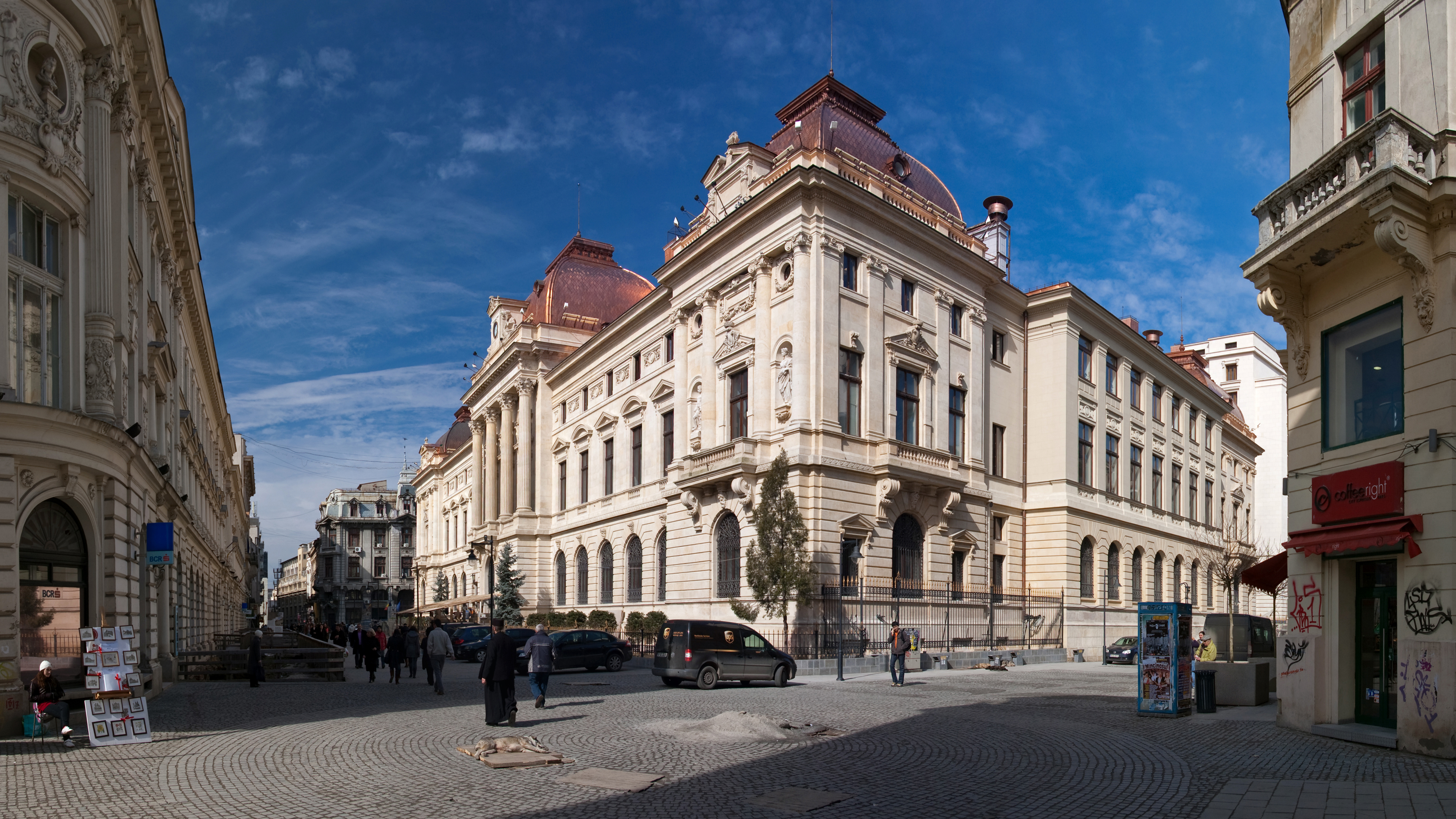
National Bank of Romania (old building)

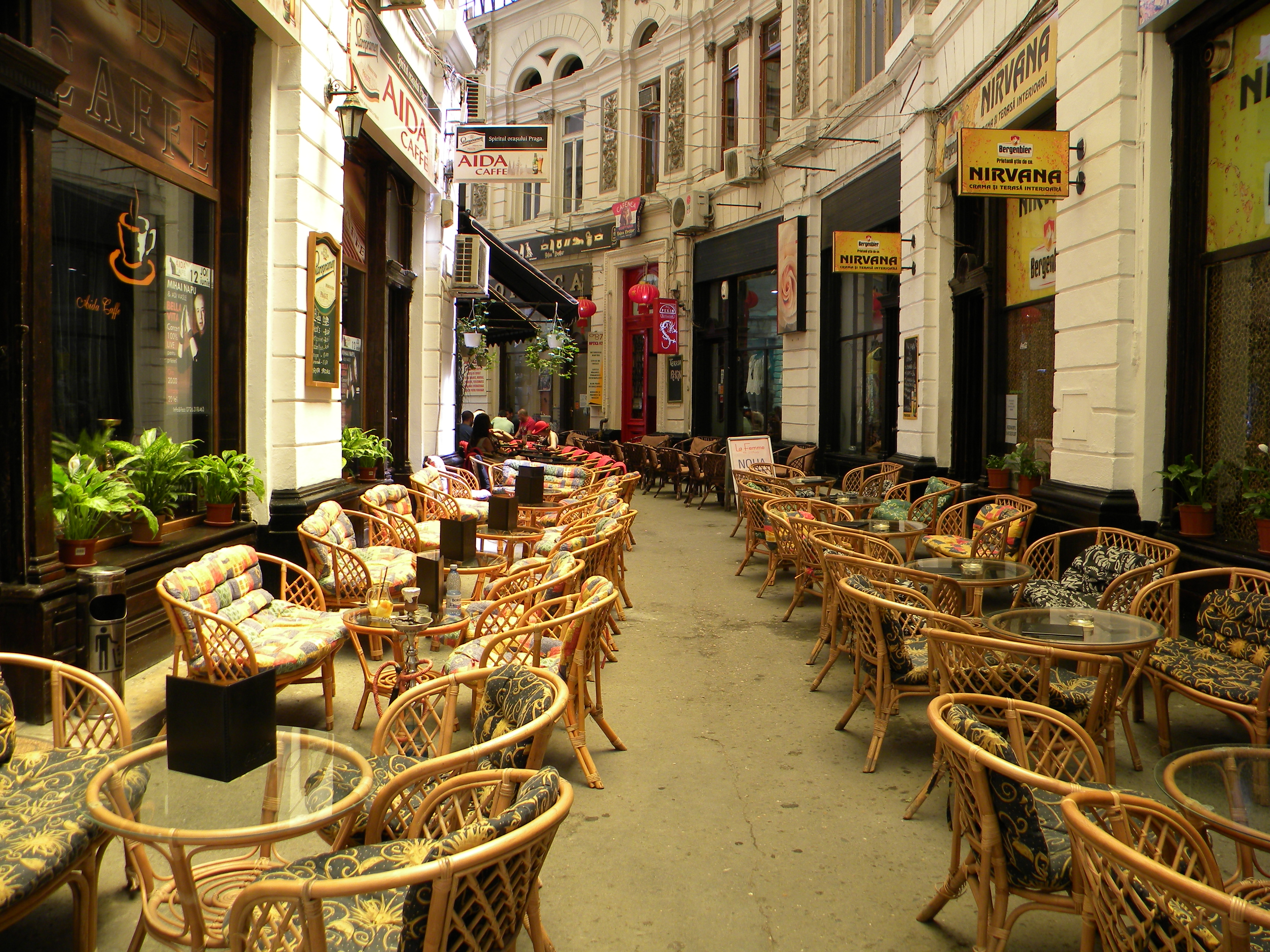
Macca-Villacrosse Passage

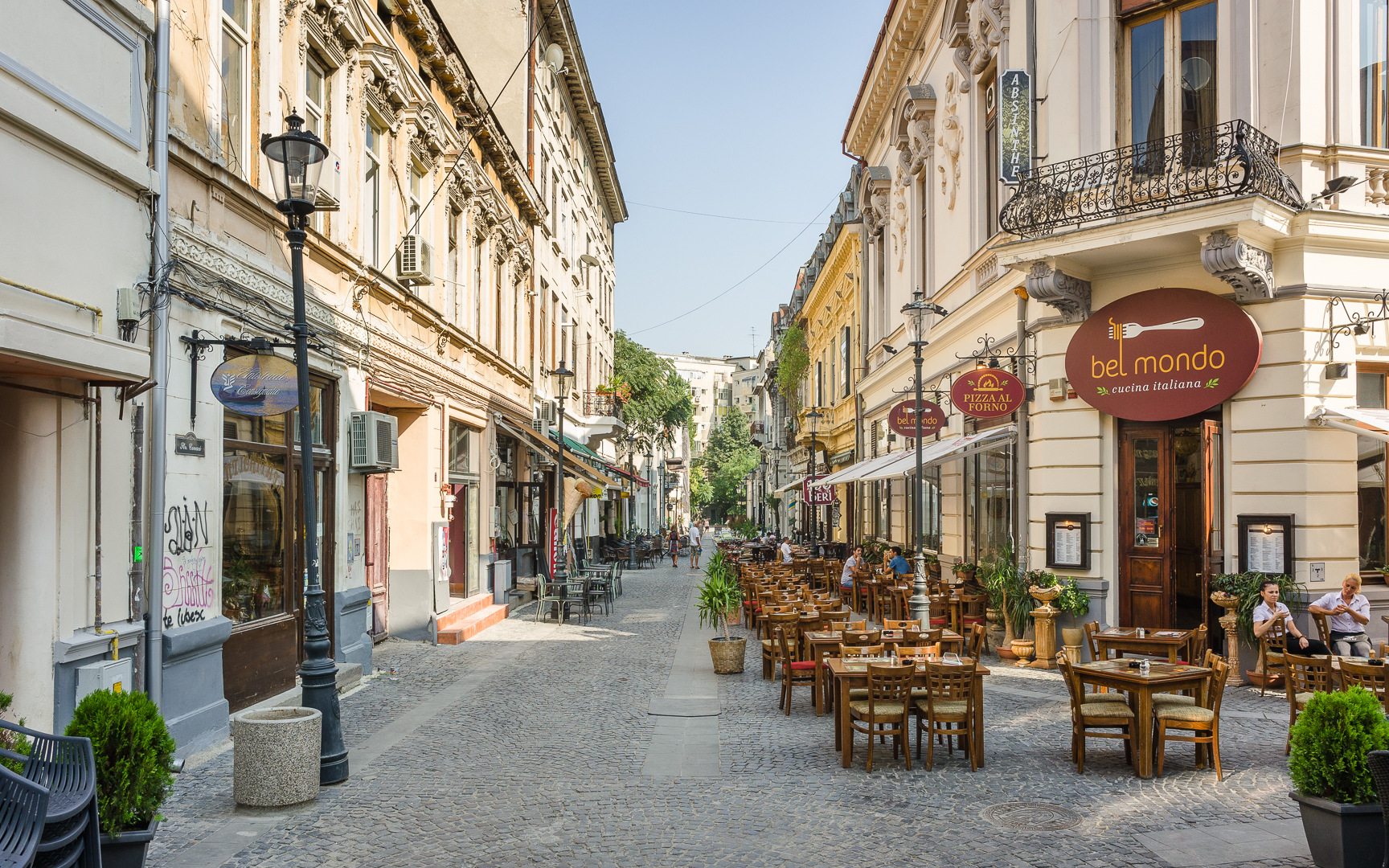
Covaci Street

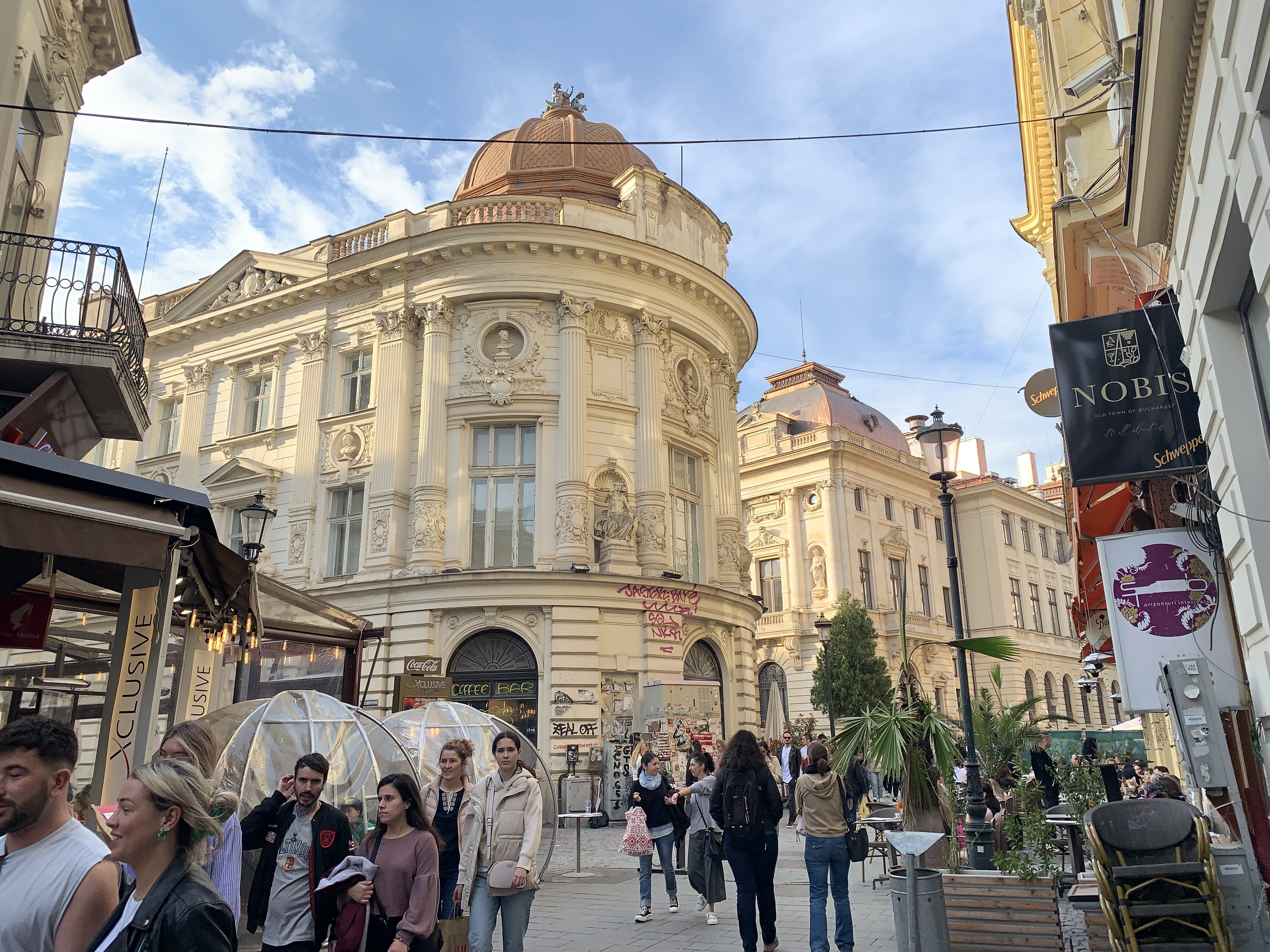
The Palace of Dacia Insurance Company, and the Old Palace of National Bank of Romania behind in 2023

== See also ==
- Bucharest Old Town
