= Hanul cu Tei =

Coordinates: 44°25′55.80″N 26°6′7.34″E

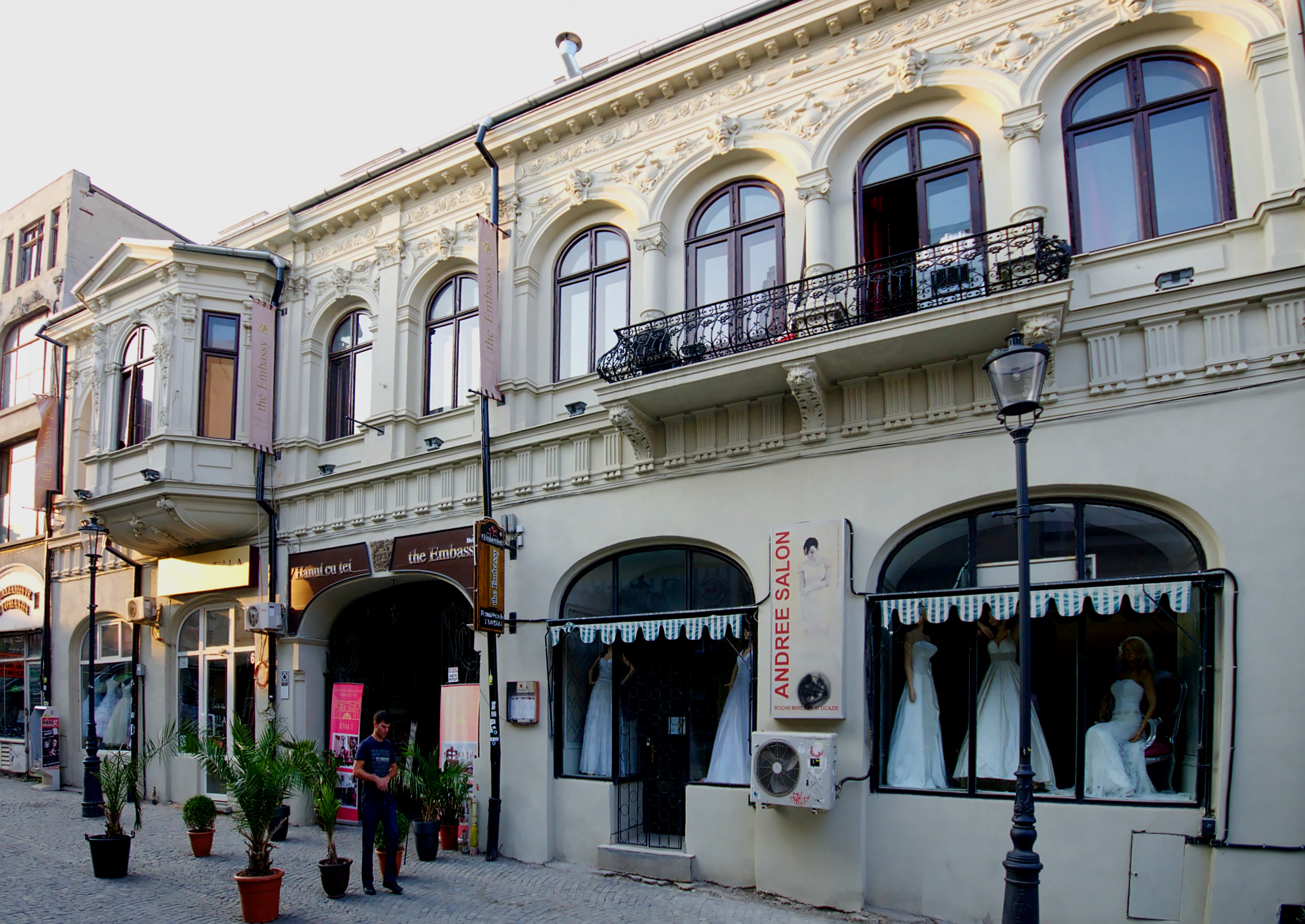
Hanul cu Tei (2011)

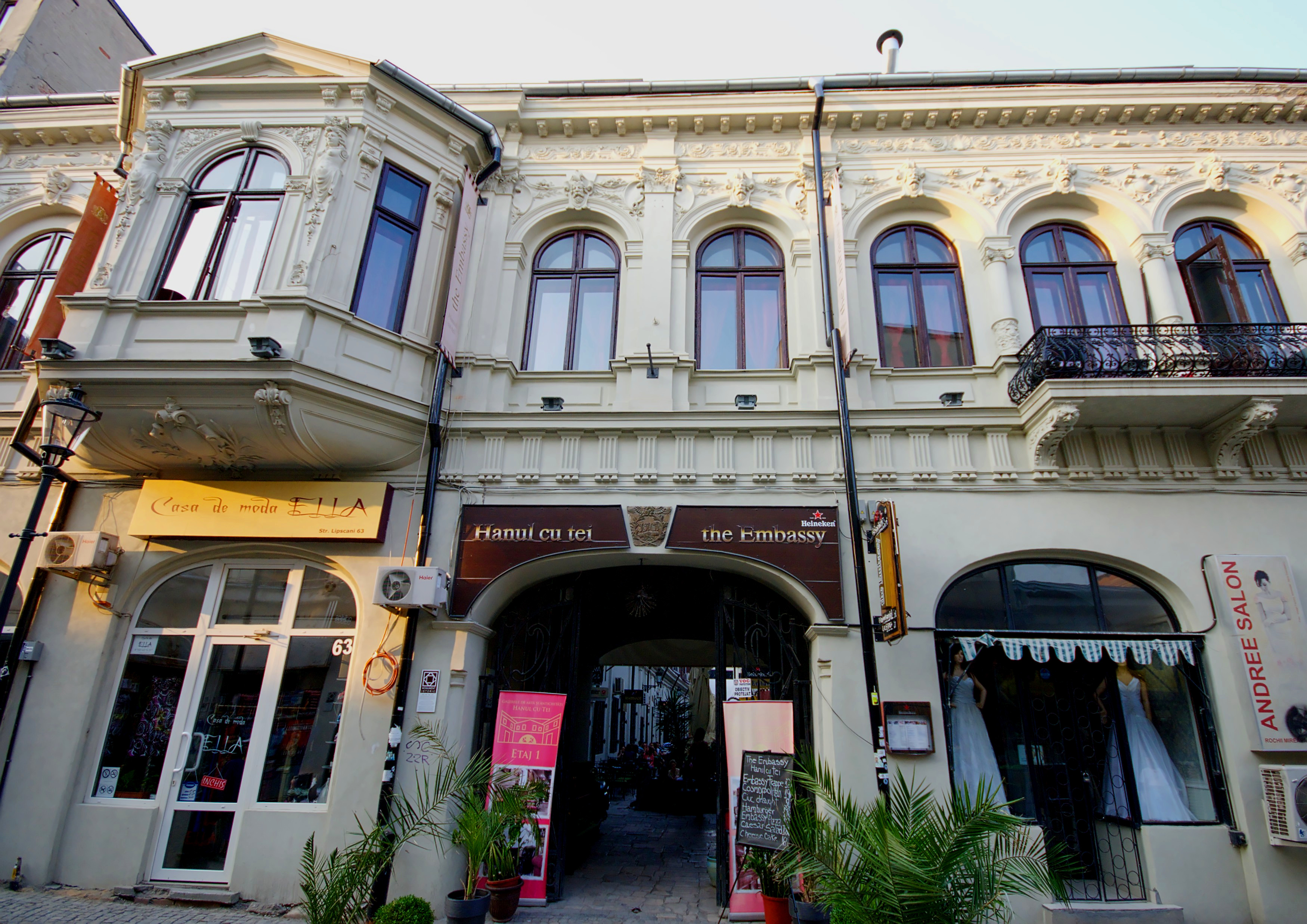
Front side

Hanul cu Tei ("The Linden tree Inn") is one of the few still standing old inns in central Bucharest, Romania.

It was built in 1833 by Anastasie Hagi Gheorghe Polizu and Ștefan Popovici, on the trading street of Lipscani. It was also called the Bezesten de pe Ulița cea mare a Marchitanilor ("The Inn on the Wide Street of the Merchants"). It is the only historic inn in Bucharest that has preserved its shape exactly as it was at its origins. At its Blănari Street entrance, one can still see the original "seal" of the first owners ("A.P." and "S.P."). Each of the owners had 14 shops, located on top of deep, vaulted cellars. Only the pedestrian alley and guardian's room were of shared ownership. Important merchants of the time were hosted in this inn, including Constantin Atanasiu, who was to establish the store La vulturul de mare cu peștele în ghiare ("At the Sea Eagle Holding a Fish in His Claws"), a building that still exists, hosting a bank nowadays, near the Cocor store.

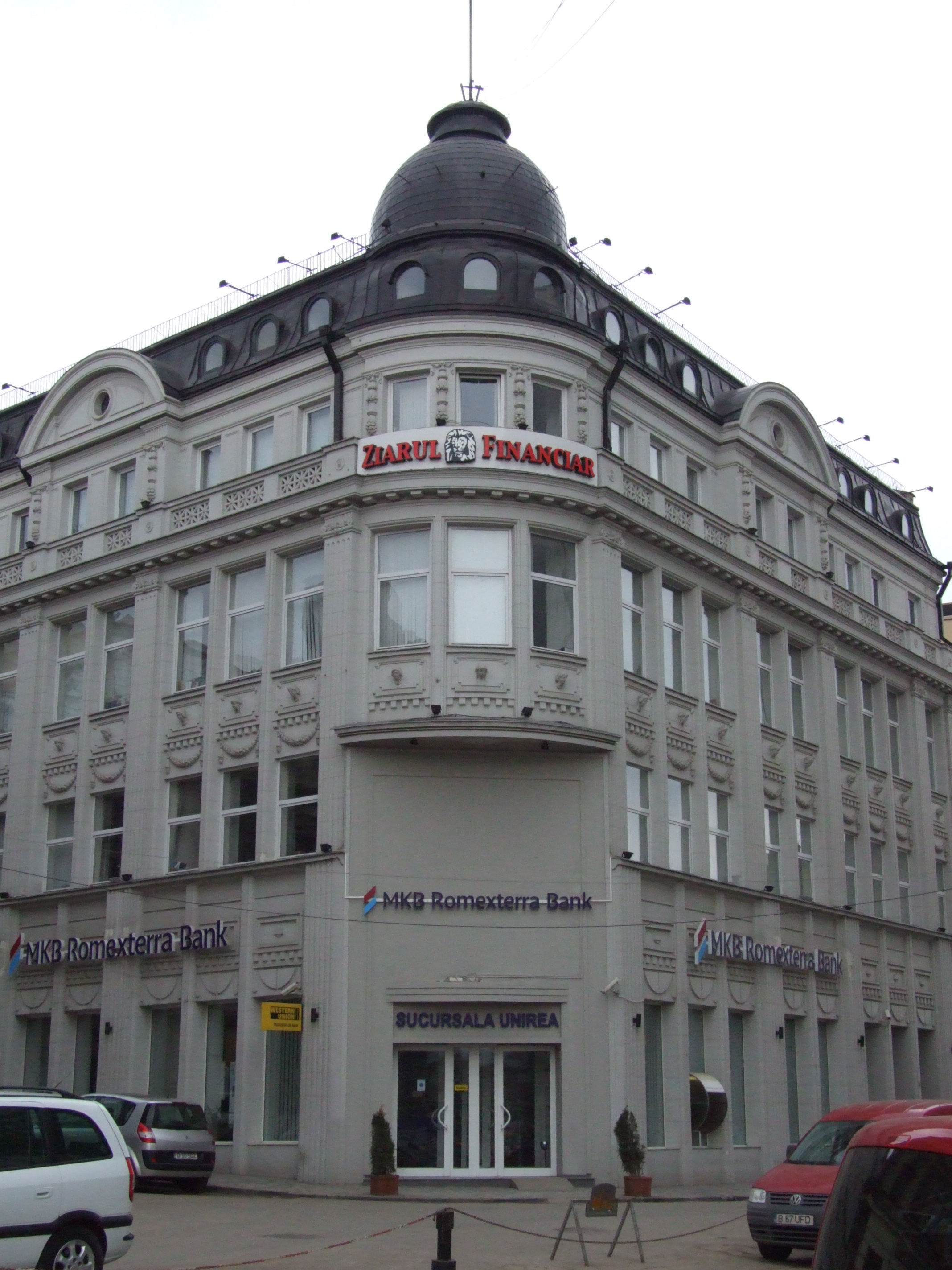
The building that hosted the La vulturul de mare cu peștele în ghiare store

Today, the former inn is home to many art galleries and a cellar bar. Its ornate, forged iron gates provide access from both Lipscani and Blănari streets. It also provides a good example the typical Wallachian glass-covered façade, as the upper floor is covered by glass panels.
