= A. de Herz =

Romanian writer and actor (1887 - 1936)

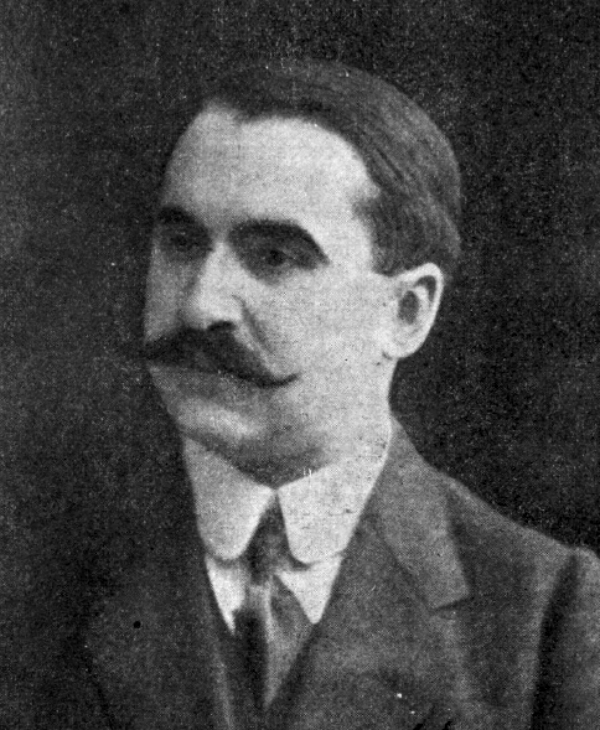
- Herz in 1912
- Born: Adolf Edmund George de Herz; December 15, 1887; Bucharest, Kingdom of Romania
- Died: March 9, 1936 (aged 48); Floreasca, Bucharest, Kingdom of Romania
- Occupations: Playwright, poet, songwriter, journalist, screenwriter, translator, stage actor, civil servant
- Writing career
- Pen name: Dinu Ramură, Mira Dăianu, Dinu, Puck
- Period: 1901–1936
- Genres: Epic poetry, verse drama, sonnet, ode, romance, fable, historical fiction, pastiche, comedy, farce, boulevardier theater, revue, libretto, reportage, short story
- Movements: Sămănătorul; Neoclassical literature Gândirea

Adolf Edmund George de Herz, commonly shortened to A. de Herz, also rendered as Hertz and Herț (December 15, 1887 – March 9, 1936), was a Romanian playwright and literary journalist, also active as a poet, short story author, and stage actor. He was the scion of an upper-class assimilated Jewish family, with its roots in Austria-Hungary. His grandfather, Adolf Sr, was a controversial banker and venture capitalist, while his father, Edgar von Herz, was noted as a translator of Romanian literature. Adolf had a privileged childhood and debuted as a poet while still in high school, producing the lyrics to a hit romance. In his early work for the stage, Herz was a traditionalist inspired by Alexandru Davila and the Sămănătorul school, but later veered toward neoclassical literature and aestheticism. His "salon comedies", staged by the National Theater Bucharest, borrowed from various authors, including Roberto Bracco, Henri Lavedan, and Haralamb Lecca, peaking in popularity in 1913, with Păianjenul ("The Spider"). By the start of World War I, Herz was also a writer of revues.

Controversy followed Herz during the early 1910s, when his writing raised suspicions of plagiarism. A vaster controversy came with Romania's participation in the war, when Herz became noted as a supporter of the Central Powers. He remained in German-occupied territory, putting out the daily paper Scena, which became a leading voice of Romanian "Germanophilia", but was also a pioneering contribution to cultural journalism. He was arrested by returning loyalists during late 1918, and sent to Văcărești Prison, where he served alongside Ioan Slavici and I. C. Frimu. Herz was finally acquitted in March 1919; the controversy nevertheless survived, also leading to authorship disputes with a former friend, Ioan Alexandru Brătescu-Voinești, and provoking the enmity of writers Liviu Rebreanu and George Ranetti.

The financially insecure Herz continued to publish plays and translations, embarking on a lasting collaboration with Constantin Tănase, and writing a revue for Josephine Baker. Starring in his own plays, he also served for a while as editor of a cultural supplement, Adevărul Literar și Artistic, then briefly as head of Dimineața daily and as interviewer for the Radio Company. Herz oversaw the directorial debut of Sică Alexandrescu, who became his production and writing partner in the 1930s; he also ensured Zaharia Stancu's literary breakthrough, and his own daughter Kuki's debut in acting. Eventually, Herz accepted appointment as chair of the National Theater Craiova in 1930, while continuing to work in other fields, and debuting as a talking-picture screenwriter.

Toppled by actors' protests and political intrigues in 1935, Herz was increasingly disfavored by critics, who discussed his creative decline into a formulaic craft. He died early the following year, after a battle with diabetes and an illness of the lungs. By then, his Jewish origin had stirred an additional controversy, which was prolonged with the adoption of antisemitic policies during most of World War II—although his plays continued to be produced by Alexandrescu and others. The communist regime was similarly adverse to the "bourgeois" work produced by Herz, though a selective recovery was allowed beginning in the late 1960s; this trend was opposed by various critics, who suggested that Herz was no longer culturally relevant.

== Biography ==
=== Early life ===
Born in Bucharest, capital of the Romanian Kingdom, his parents were Edgar von Herz (or Edgard de Hertz) and his wife Maria (née Kereszteyi). On his paternal side, he belonged to Austrian nobility, and had links with the Duchy of Bukovina: his grandfather, Baron Adolf von Herz, was president of the imperial railway connecting Lemberg to Iași; he married a Maria Moreau. The Baron, a man of Austrian Jewish extraction, was living in Vienna in 1850, when he patented his design for a sugar refinery. Attested as having relocated to the Free City of Frankfurt by 1858, he helped build the Lemberg–Iași railway with support from Thomas Brassey, but only after relocating again, to Bucharest. His investment portfolio included, in 1865, a "Bank of Romania", which was the first modern credit institution of the United Principalities. After this was closed following political disputes, the Baron remained active as the representative of North British and Mercantile Insurance, and also involved himself in projects for setting up agricultural banks. He later reestablished the larger bank and became its general manager, investing heavily in the State Tobacco Monopoly, before ultimately resigning in 1876. By then, his alleged bribery of Finance Minister Petre Mavrogheni had become a public scandal. He died in August 1881, at Bad Gastein.

The Herzes were Roman Catholics, but, according to historian Lucian Boia, "perfectly assimilated into Romanian culture." The playwright's father was a high-level bank clerk, and the son experienced a privileged childhood at Romania's royal court, which granted him its privilege for many years. In addition to his business profile, Edgar had musical and literary interests. In 1878, he was a pianist, performing alongside Eduard Hübsch at the Romanian Atheneum. Edgar also translated into German the play Fântâna Blanduziei, by Vasile Alecsandri (1885), and the poem Luceafărul, by Mihai Eminescu (1893). Adolf Sr's other son, Edmond, was a former officer in the Austrian Army; he had married Iza, daughter of Prince Dimitrie Ghica, who reportedly frowned upon his in-laws' Jewishness. Iza (born Maria Ghica) was a published essayist, and some sources credit her as Herz's mother. The couple in fact had a daughter, also named Maria.

As Herz himself recalled later in life, he was "born an actor", and from age six or seven regularly attended premieres and then, upon returning home, improvised scenes for his family. Herz's primary schooling consisted of private lessons; he attended Gheorghe Lazăr High School in his native city. Critic Barbu Lăzăreanu reports that, during recess here, he tried out his talents as a comedian, and became "the unparalleled mime". A colleague of Herz's, the future theater chronicler Paul I. Prodan, notes that he was a sentimental figure, who lamented the fate of snowmen used by other students for snowball target practice. He began literary activity with sonnets, odes, romances and fables—recorded in a notebook covering the years 1901–1903, and discovered only after his death. Lăzăreanu, who read it, notes that it owed inspiration to Alecsandri and Eminescu; it also contained pastiches from Alfred de Musset and Alexandre Dumas fils. In November 1901, he was a guest of Queen Elisabeth, to whom he recited one of his poems. He later reviewed this work of his as "very bad".

For two years, Herz was enrolled at the military school in Iași; he was colleagues with two future generals, Traian Eremia Grigorescu and Gabriel Marinescu. He disliked the atmosphere and rebelled, writing poetry on the dormitory walls. He was also reportedly a student of Mihai Viteazul National College, during which time he wrote new poetry, as well as drama, using the pen name Dinu Ramură. Around 1904, at age 17, Herz went public with De ziua nunții tale-ți scriu ("I Write This on Your Wedding Day"), which became a highly popular romance. According to theatrical folklore, the piece was about Herz's unrequited love for actress Agepsina Macri, who married dramatist Victor Eftimiu.

After completing high school in 1907, Herz entered the literature and philosophy faculty of the University of Bucharest, where he was a good student and drew favorable notice from professors such as Titu Maiorescu, Mihail Dragomirescu and Pompiliu Eliade. His verses first appeared in print in 1906, hosted by Luceafărul, followed by similar pieces in Sămănătorul and Vieața Nouă. Critic Nicolae Iorga mentioned a characteristic poem about Iliaș Rareș, signed as Dinu Ramură and composed in "monotonous alexandrines". These and other early experiments in verse drama were heavily inspired by the writings of Alexandru Davila, to the point of imitation. According to Dragomirescu, they provide the only sample of a traditionalist theater in line with Sămănătorul commands, but are lacking in dramatic effect: Herz's "pitiful" contributions had not preserved classical unities. Despite such reviews, the works made Herz a respected figure at his school, and provoked his jealous classmate, Alexandru Kirițescu, to begin his own literary career—initially, much less successfully.

After being accepted at Vieața Nouă, Herz moved into neoclassical literature and aestheticism, but, as Dragomirescu notes, was "merely a beginner" in both. Herz's debut play was the 1907 Domnița Ruxandra, dramatizing the life of an eponymous 17th-century princess. With borrowings from both Davila and Pierre Corneille, it earned praise from a prominent literary figure, George Panu. It followed in 1908 by Floare de nalbă ("Marsh Mallow"). According to Eftimiu, Herz's writing moved away from Davila's influence, and came to resemble the work of Haralamb Lecca. Both Dragomirescu and Eugen Lovinescu viewed Floare de nalbă as profoundly indebted to Alexandre Dumas' Camille. By then, he was also published by Dragomirescu's own Convorbiri Critice, notably with the 1908 "dramatic idyll" A fost odată ("Once upon a Time"), and by Făt Frumos, with a translated fragment from Jean Racine's Phèdre (1909). He still contributed poetry, mainly in Maiorescu's Convorbiri Literare—which also put out another one of his plays, the 1911 Biruința ("Victory"). Five other plays came in quick succession: Noaptea Învierii ("Resurrection Night", 1909), Când ochii plâng ("When Eyes Shed Tears", 1911), Păianjenul ("The Spider", 1913), Bunicul ("Grandfather", also 1913), and Cuceritorul ("The Conqueror", 1914).

=== Breakthrough ===
Several of these texts were staged by the National Theater Bucharest, which was led by Eliade, then by Davila and Ioan Bacalbașa. In January 1909, it produced Domnița Ruxandra, marking the first-ever performance of a Herz play. Directed by the professional actor Ion Livescu, it was unusual for having an all-amateur cast, comprising only high-school students. At the Romanian Academy, Maiorescu rejected the play, which was competing for the Năsturel Award. In later years, however, he granted occasional sponsorship to Herz. The latter praised Maiorescu as his adviser and moral benchmark, assuring him of his "undying devotion". Biruința was accepted by Davila in May 1911 and registered accolades. It was also taken up for production by Iași's state theater in November, but did not play to a full house. Writing at the time, reviewer Corneliu Carp alleged that the local public preferred sensationalism and melodrama to Herz's "tame, normal, simple" text. Also taken up by the National Theater Bucharest, Noaptea Învierii "failed to catch on", and is described by Lovinescu as very similar to his own earlier play, De peste prag. Când ochii plâng was first shown at a provincial venue, the National Theater Craiova, with Agatha Bârsescu as a lead. Masca, the local magazine for theatergoers, gave it a scathing review: Herz's text was the "supreme bore", complete with "sordid platitudes" that Bârsescu's performance could not alleviate.

Herz returned to Bucharest with Păianjenul, which was an "unparalleled" or "great success" on its premiere. According to Livescu and critic Ioan Massoff, it became an absolute triumph for both the author and the lead actors, Maria Giurgea and Tony Bulandra. Around that time, he reportedly drew a profit of almost a million lei per play, which was an unprecedented achievement. In Păianjenul, a widow pretends to be "debauched" so as to seem more fashionable. According to the literary scholar George Călinescu, the theme and layout prefigure Luigi Pirandello, but also reinstate old favorites of the public. Likewise, Lovinescu suggests that Păianjenul is largely a copy of Roberto Bracco's Perfetto amore, but mutated into the realm of comedy. The result, however, is superior, and itself a "model for salon comedies". Lovinescu's hypothesis about Bracco and Herz was at the center of a plagiarism scandal. Other writers maintained favorable opinions of Păianjenul: Livescu finds in it both of Herz's faces, "the poet and the humorist", joined with "clear precision in creating scenarios and a technique that is anything but banal"; while Massoff sees it as "the first and perhaps the best of Romania's salon comedies". The same is argued by theatrologist Vera Molea, who proposes that Păianjenul remains "the most accomplished writing by the prolific A. de Herz."

As noted by scholar Mircea Popa, Herz was a renowned journalist in his time, but also had significant contributions to the development of Romanian theatrical life, through both his magazines and the plays he wrote. This verdict is contrasted by Călinescu, who views Herz as mainly a "theatrical industrialist" and "frank sentimentalist", with only Păianjenul and Bunicul emerging as more lasting contributions. In writing Bunicul, Herz was apparently inspired by Henri Lavedan's Marquis de Priola, similarly depicting an aging seducer, Manole Corbea, trying and failing to win the favors of a much younger woman. The scenario is seen by Călinescu as a collection "of trifles, sometimes tedious", but nonetheless "trifles assembled with skill." Contrarily, Lovinescu describes Bunicul as "weak" and "incoherent", with jocular phrases that "do nothing to disperse its banality." Shortly after the premiere, Luceafărul reported that the "much-touted play" was a flop, noting that its "talented author" had "chiseled away a piece of glass, [rather than] a diamond." Reviewers for both Flacăra and Opinia saw Bunicul as a lifeless text, arguing that Herz had taken "two steps back". "The Baron" was still not validated by critics with Cuceritorul: a reviewer at Universul Literar called the play "incoherent", and alleged that Herz had only written it because Bulandra wanted him to.

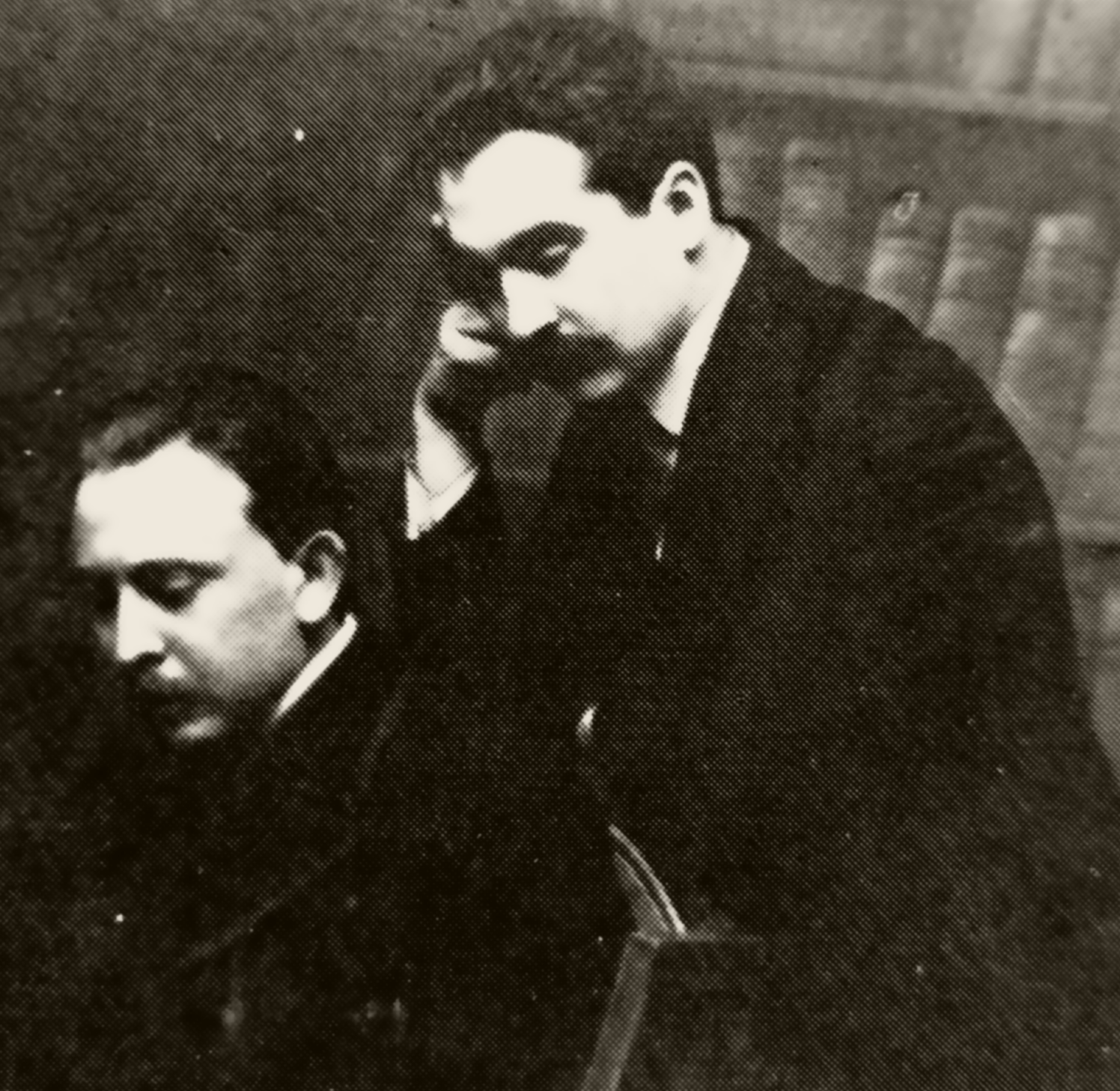
Herz and Octavian Goga, photographed around 1910

Herz was a founding member of the Romanian Writers' Society (SSR), a literary secretary at the National Theater Bucharest, and an editor-in-chief of the literary magazine Făt-Frumos. In 1910–1911, he visited the Romanian communities of Austria-Hungary, including Bukovina, as part of a literary tour that also hosted Iorga, Eftimiu, Emil Gârleanu, Octavian Goga, Al. T. Stamatiad, and Caton Theodorian. He cultivated a friendship with Eftimiu, and together with him met the senior poet George Coșbuc, whom they both admired. As recalled by Eftimiu, the meeting proved to them that, in everyday life, Coșbuc was a bore. In April 1911, the Romanian Theatrical Society elected Herz on its first Steering Committee, alongside George Diamandy, Paul Gusty, George Ranetti, and Radu D. Rosetti. The following year, Herz, Gârleanu and Rosetti appeared at Comoedia Theater during a recital which honored the senior playwright Ion Luca Caragiale; honored guests included Marie of Romania and Prince Carol. Herz had a stint as chief of staff for Dimitrie S. Nenițescu, the Conservative Minister of Commerce, together with whom he traveled to Galați for the unveiling of Costache Negri's statue (July 1912). He was sacked in October, upon the arrival of a National Liberal, Nicolae Xenopol. In his review of the issue, Herz's colleague Ranetti joked that Herz might have been disliked for his aristocratic airs, or that Xenopol "wanted to return him to his real vocation".

Also in 1912, Herz's adaptation of Henri Murger's Kind Old Man premiered at the National Theater. This was repeated in 1914, when the same troupe staged Herz's version of L'Apôtre, by Paul Hyacinthe Loyson. During those years, Herz also contributed to Flacăra, Viața Românească, Dimineața, Adevărul, Epoca and Rampa. For a while in 1914, Herz and painter Jean Alexandru Steriadi published their a popular magazine, Ilustrațiunea Română. In 1915, together with Ioan Alexandru Brătescu-Voinești, he co-wrote another play, Sorana. Also then, he produced at Comoedia the play Voiaj în China ("Voyage to China"), allowing a 17-year-old Sică Alexandrescu to take over as director. His other work included theater criticism; he still used the pseudonym Dinu Ramură, alongside Mira Dăianu and Dinu.

=== Becoming a "Germanophile" ===
Herz's career was mired in controversy during Romania's involvement in World War I. The first two years were of cautious neutrality, during which Romanian public opinion divided itself between supporting the Entente or the Central Powers. Initially, Herz was friendly toward the former, producing in July 1915 a montage of patriotic verse by Eftimiu and Goga. Called Cântarea României ("Romania's Song"), and starring Édouard de Max, it hinted to the annexation of Bukovina and Transylvania. Epigrammatist Cincinat Pavelescu describes a latent rivalry between Herz and Goga, after the latter had experience major success with his own Transylvania-themed plays. Pavelescu himself stoked such tensions by composing verse which made unflattering allusions to Herz's "Semitic" origin. It read:

De când trecu Carpații Goga,
Să facă artă, nu comerț,
Nu-i mai rămase lui de Herz,
Ca teatru, decât Sinagoga!

Translation:

With Goga crossing over mountains in a rage,
To make theater back into a craft,
Herz has been left without his graft:
The Synagogue is now his only stage!

Before December 1915, Herz had written the scenario for a café-chantant, Melcul ("The Snail"). Noticed for his contribution to the revue genre, Herz was also working with Nicolae Niculescu-Buzău, the star of anti-war plays, at the Alhambra. He also contributed the libretto for an operetta, Dragostea Corinei ("Corina's Love"), with Ionel G. Brătianu as his composer. By January 1916, the latter was being performed by the Grigoriu troupe with "extraordinary success". According to Niculescu's recollection, Herz proved "rather good" at creating "dialogue, humorous prose and misunderstandings".

Over those months, Herz had drifted toward support for the Central Powers, writing theatrical columns in Steagul newspaper and having friendly encounters with a "Germanophile" agent, Alexandru Bogdan-Pitești. From August 1916, the Treaty of Bucharest formalized Romania's alliance with the Entente. This interrupted Herz's work for the musical theater. By October, "a major newspaper from the Capital" employed him to write a reportage on the planned execution of draft evaders at Craiova. While there, he befriended Radu Demetrescu-Gyr, an eleven-years-old aspiring poet, teaching him about meter and encouraging him to write more. Herz returned to his activities in Bucharest, and, in late 1916, took into his personal care the actor Ion Iancovescu, who had been wounded on the front and, upon his return to civilian life, had been left homeless.

In December 1916, the city was conquered by the Central Powers, beginning almost two years of foreign occupation; Herz did not join in Bucharest's evacuation. After May 1917, Herz became a contributor to Săptămâna Ilustrată magazine, which was a main component of the German propaganda apparatus in Romania. In June of that year, he met Lilly Tănăsescu, and married her in July. An operetta performer based in Craiova, she was the daughter of noted actor Ion Tănăsescu. She continued to act in shows at Gabrielescu's theater until the birth of their first child, daughter Alexandra Maria. Eftimiu reports that Herz felt grateful toward Lilly, who had stood by him "in times of need", and fell for her instead of prospecting "the rich bourgeoisie of Bucharest". As reported by Massoff, Herz radically changed his philandering ways and "turned bourgeois", spending much time with his family and especially his two "adored" children, Alexandra "Kuki" and Nonu.

Under the caretaker, Germanophile administration set up by Lupu Kostaki, Nenițescu made his return as a Finance Minister. As early as April 1917, he nominated Herz for the chairmanship of the National Theater. This proposal was opposed by the actors, prompting Nenițescu to terminate their state subsidies; the German managers showed solidarity with their employees, and split their own salaries with the troupe. Herz was still involved in the shows at Ambasadori Garden, joining Davila and Gabrielescu's summer troupes. One performance of September 5–6 raised money for blinded soldiers. It included productions of Herz's revues, Dă-i drumul odată și mor ("Just You Turn It On and I'll Die") and Treci la rând ("Get in Line"), starring Lilly, and with Herz himself appearing on stage to recite a couplet. He was also commissioned by singer Alexandru Bărcănescu to write a one-act musical comedy, Boerul Buflea ("Buflea the Boyar"), which was performed as a live act at Cinema-Variété Regal in October. In November, he staged another musical comedy, Rândunica ("The Swallow"), with its proceeds going to the Romanian Red Cross.

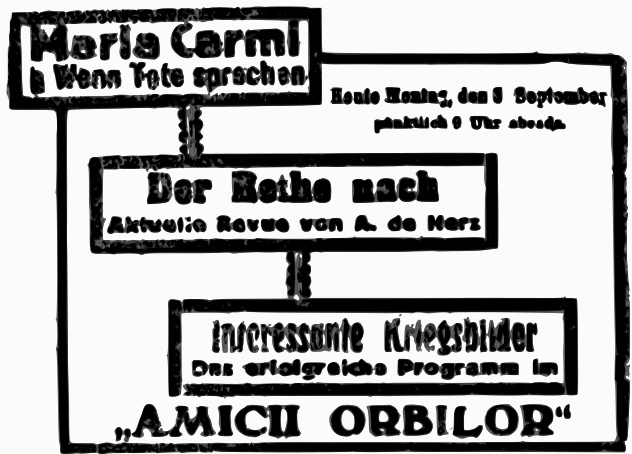
German-language advertisement for a charity show benefiting the blind, published in Bukarester Tagblatt in September 1917. Herz's revue as a second attraction, after a screening of Wenn Tote sprechen, starring Maria Carmi

On September 27, Herz, together with Liviu Rebreanu, had inaugurated a cultural daily, Scena ("The Stage"), which had contributions from a diverse selection of writers: Davila, Felix Aderca, Victor Anestin, Sarina Cassvan, Vasile Demetrius, Gala Galaction, Lucrezzia Karnabatt, Adrian Maniu, Barbu Nemțeanu, I. Peltz, Camil Petrescu, Tudor Teodorescu-Braniște, and I. C. Vissarion. The editorial staff included, among others, Scarlat Froda, Barbu Lăzăreanu, Ilie Moscovici, and Alexandru Terziman. The editorial line alternated between messages about the preservation of Romanian culture under problematic circumstances and shows of complete support for the German occupier.

As noted by Boia, Herz's publication of a theatrical daily "would have been a true feat even under normal circumstances"; "leaving aside his excessive language, which can be explained in context, the fact remains that [Herz] was a greatly capable chief for a cultural gazette and animator of cultural life under stressful conditions." According to Peltz, Herz displayed an "extraordinary power of conviction, he was instantly likeable." "Never infected with the microbe of envy", he was enthusiastic about the work of others, promoting in particular the writer and "son of peasants" Alexandru Bucur. However, the Baron could also be sarcastic, entertaining his employees with impressions of themselves and of writers he viewed as mediocre, in particular Maica Smara. According to Livescu, Herz was as much interesting to "reading intellectuals" as he was an avid gossiper, though his blather remained "spiritual and urbane". As noted by Massoff, "the Baron [knew] how to pull on people's tiny strings, and also how to make himself a strain of gratuitous enemies—though his was not a wicked soul." "Herz's tiny intrigues" existed to keep him entertained and, "truth be told, he received more kicks than he gave."

=== Scandals and trial ===
Scena was increasingly indebted to "Germanophile" politics; Herz's own articles reinforced this orientation. They include an April 1918 praise for Ludwig von Gebsattel, who led Germany's censorship office in occupied Romania. Therein, Herz argued that Gebsattel had presided upon the survival of Bucharest's theaters. In February 1918, Scena also hosted Coșbuc's last-ever poem, "The Eagle", which probably alludes to Romania's wartime disasters. Other pieces attacked Ententist writers and theater professionals who had resettled in Iași, singling out Diamandy, Ranetti, Sadoveanu, Nicolae N. Beldiceanu, Petre Locusteanu, and Corneliu Moldovanu. Herz personally covered Barbu Ștefănescu Delavrancea's death, stirring up controversy by questioning his rival's patriotism. Other members of this exile cohort did not resent Herz for his stances: a December 1917 letter sent from Iași by actor Alexandru Mavrodi shows that he regularly read Scena, and that he was glad to learn of Rândunica's "apparent success".

Rebreanu quit Scena after only three weeks, and, moving on to become staff critic for Constantin Stere's Lumina, panned Boerul Buflea and Rândunica. He soon ran afoul of the occupying authorities, and suspected that Herz was denouncing him. The two remained rivals: as late as 1935, Herz claimed that he had kept the copy of a revue entirely authored by Rebreanu, written in a style that would have harmed Rebreanu's reputation. In March 1918, Comoedia Theater produced Herz's new play, Vălul de pe ochi ("A Veil over One's Eyes"), with all proceeds going to the orphans of war. Herz was still in Bucharest following the Romanian surrender, and expected there the return of professionals from their exile in Iași. A coalition of Conservative Germanophiles took over, with Alexandru Marghiloman as Prime Minister. Following this move, Scena began receiving contributions from decommissioned soldiers, including George Topîrceanu, Avram Steuerman-Rodion, and H. Bonciu.

During that summer, several other of Herz's revues were produced at Ambasadori, including: Fata cu trei case din dafin ("Three-housed Girl of the Laurel Tree"), Țațo nu te supăra ("Frump Be Not Mad"), and Bac (from "Baccarat"). According to his wife, he wrote a new revue each night, including De-aia n'are ursul coadă ("That's Why Bears Don't Have Their Tails"). Scena reported on the Germanized theatrical milieu of Bucharest. Its film chronicles praised German propaganda films, including one produced in Bucharest, with live footage of Marshal Mackensen, and gave ample coverage to German or Austrian film stars, including Leda Gys, Mia May, Hella Moja and Alwin Neuß. Scena also reported on tours by Theater an der Wien and Darmstadt Court Opera, as well as German plays staged by Romanian managers such as Velimir Maximilian and Marioara Voiculescu. Nevertheless, Herz and Maximilian had a running dispute, which peaked in October, when Maximilian slapped Herz in public, on Calea Victoriei. Around that time, the brochure Caricatura sub ocupație ("Caricature during the Occupation"), attributed by Călinescu to Herz himself and by others to Maniu, presented the work of a staff cartoonist by the name of Philips, who had "tried to replace our famous draftsmen".

Scena's politics became the subject of debates and scrutiny with the November Armistice: the paper ended publication on the very day of its signing, by which time the Marghiloman government had already fallen. Herz was arrested at Galați in early December 1918, during a general clampdown on "Germanophiles". According to Marghiloman, the new government did not necessarily want him tried, but an Ententist journalist, Gheorghe Matei Corbescu, pulled the strings. Herz was formally deemed by the Government Commissioner as "posing a danger to the Allied troops"; he was kept under guard at Hotel Modern, and interrogated alongside Dumitru Karnabatt, Dem. Theodorescu, and Saniel Grossman. "The Baron" was then sent to Văcărești Prison, awaiting trial. While there, he witnessed the death in custody of I. C. Frimu, an activist of the Socialist Party. His testimonial on the subject argues that Frimu was "mercilessly beaten", which compromised his immunity and aggravated his typhus. At Văcărești, the playwright was also reunited with Bogdan-Pitești and met Ioan Slavici, who described "baron de Herz" as a "lively, spirited, sweet youth". Herz would later inspire the aged Slavici to write his memoirs, including details of his encounters with Mihai Eminescu. Herz claimed that Slavici had privately revealed himself as the real author of Făt-Frumos din lacrimă, which is generally attributed to Eminescu.

In February–March 1919, Herz was court-martialled, with 22 other "collaborationist" journalists, by the Second Army. He was among the acquitted, while his colleague Rebreanu was only called upon as a witness. Nonetheless, the label of "traitor" was long applied to Herz, especially at delicate moments. At this stage, Brătescu-Voinești struck out Herz's name from all new editions of Sorana. As noted by literary historian Dan Mănucă, Brătescu had a simmering conflict with another collaborationist, Tudor Arghezi, and viewed by the latter as a leading enemy of his Germanophile colleagues. Mănucă argues that this view was exaggerated, but also that its escalation pushed Brătescu into a conflict with Herz. According to Călinescu, "the paternity of the play is disputed", with the overall intrigue redolent of Herz's plays, and some "stylistic turns" being characteristic for Brătescu's prose. Herz, who was backed by Arghezi and Pamfil Șeicaru, accused his former friend publicly, and eventually took him to court, where he won reparations.

Also in 1919, Rebreanu completed the biographical novel Calvarul ("Ordeal"), which portrays Herz as "Henric Adler", the antagonist. During that period, Herz was also being publicly exposed as Jewish. As noted by the newspaper Afirmarea, Herz viewed himself as a "God-fearing Christian", and the allegation caused him "much suffering". In late 1923, Ranetti's review Furnica noted Herz's association with a rival paper, Masca. Ranetti derided Herz as a "Semitic aristocrat", calling attention to his "disgusting behavior under the occupation"; he demanded that Masca be censored. In 1924, Herz's name was included on a black list of Jewish journalists, which was circulated by the Transylvanian press. An official organ of the Vad Orthodox Diocese published it with a note that "these Jews are hoping to influence Romanian public opinion"; Clujul weekly identified Herz as an agent of Jewish "subversion", demanding that he leave the Romanian press.

=== Recovery and failure ===
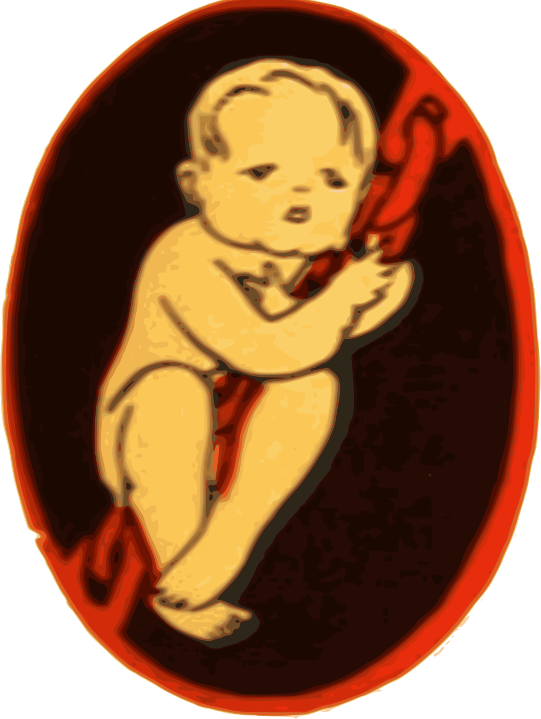
Cover art for the first edition of Mărgeluș, by Victor Ion Popa

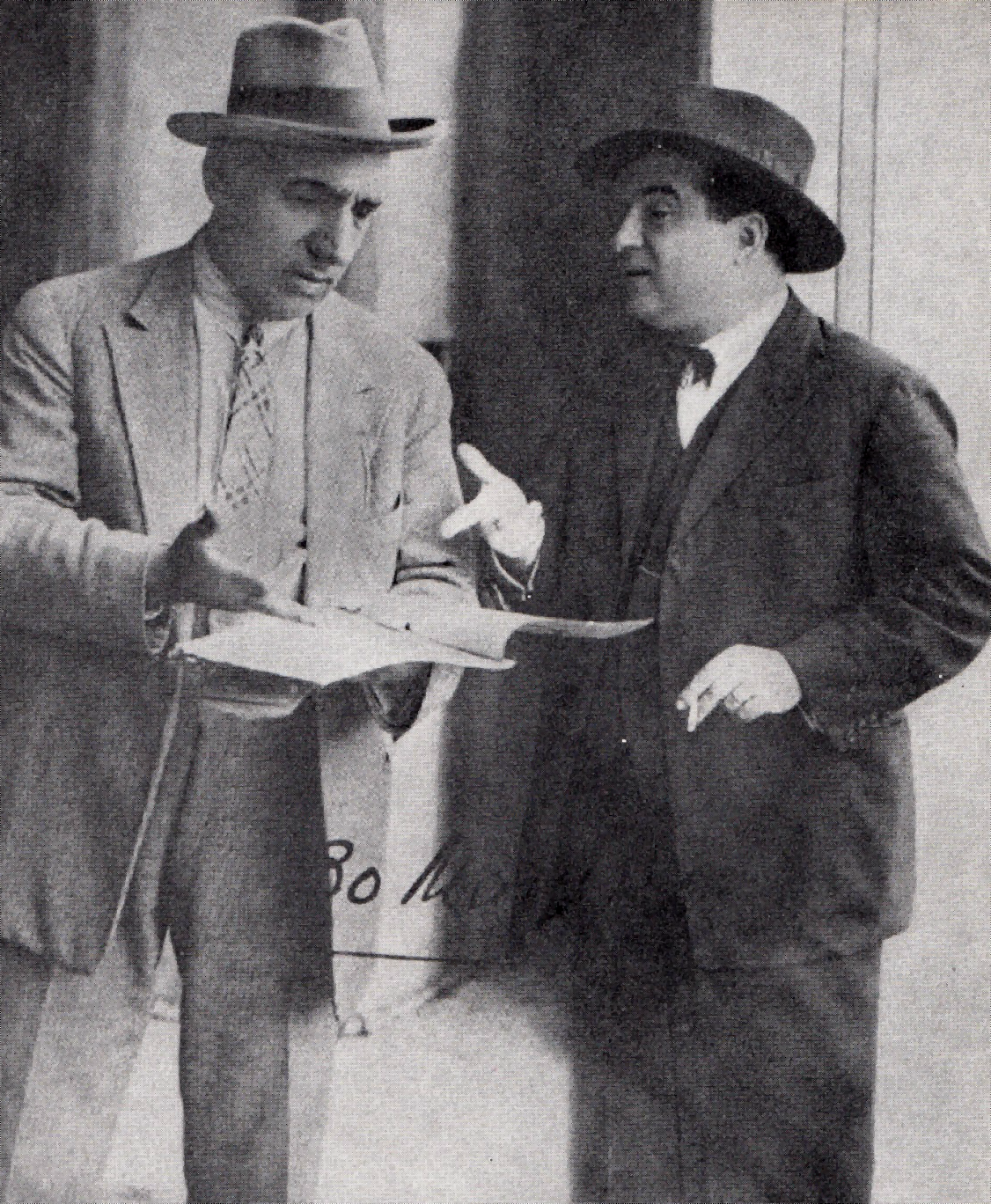
Herz (on the right) with Constantin Tănase, in 1925

Herz resumed his other activity in the interwar's Greater Romania, first with translations of composer biographies by Romain Rolland (in 1918, as the first-ever translation into Romanian of a text by Rolland) and Houston Stewart Chamberlain. From 1920 to 1924, he put out Adevărul Literar și Artistic, while also penning contributions to Gândirea. According to his friend Gyr, as an editor he was superior to the "vulgar" Mihail Sevastos: under Herz's tenure, Adevărul Literar și Artistic remained "the meeting spot of all literary talent", with contributions that were "lively and varied". From this position, Herz approved for print the first poems ever published by Zaharia Stancu. In 1923, Herz joined Caton Theodorian's Society of Romanian Dramatic Authors, serving as its censor, alongside Eftimiu. He returned to the stage with various new plays, including Mărgeluș ("Tiny Bead", 1921) and Șeful Gării ("The Station-Master", 1924); he also returned to Flacăra, publishing therein fragments from a historical play, Colivia de aur ("A Golden Cage", 1923). In 1922, fragments from his Păianjenul, translated into German, appeared in the Bukovina magazine Die Brücke.

Călinescu reserves some praise for Mărgeluș, a "more literary" play, in which the unborn child of a typist holds together her relationship with an upper-class youth. In Sburătorul, Felix Aderca also gave Mărgeluș a positive review, describing it as a "modern drama, classical in its simplicity", but also a discreet and gifted comedy. Aderca remarked in particular Herz's wordplay, which, he argued, made the writer a companion of Caragiale and Molière. As argued by the Transylvanian review Cele Trei Crișuri, Mărgeluș restated Herz's "rare qualities", provoking "thunderous applause". The play was first produced by Regina Maria Theater, under the twin direction of Niculescu-Buzău and M. Antonescu. The latter also appeared in the title role, to positive reviews. Before 1922, the play had 78 reprisals, the biggest hit on Romania's theater circuit for that season. Manager Ludovic Dauș also bought the play for Chișinău National Theater, which went on a regional tour of Bessarabia in 1924.

After 1920, Herz reaffirmed his traditionalism as a theater critic, being vocal as a critic of Expressionist tendencies, and specifically of director Karlheinz Martin. Martin was his direct competitor: during his stay in Bucharest, he ran three Expressionist plays with at least 74 stagings between them. Writing in 1925, theorist Ion Sân-Giorgiu argued that Eftimiu and Herz's overall output could restore Romanian drama, chasing away the "mood of superficiality". Such appraisals were contrasted by other observers. Among the traditionalists, Iorga remained critical of Herz's works, viewing them as "well-made plays" with "indifferent characters", marked by a "strain of cynicism". As seen by Iorga, Herz remained indebted to Adrien Bernheim and Georges de Porto-Riche. Criticism also came from the avant-garde: in 1924 Scarlat Callimachi singled out Herz and Camil Petrescu as dramatists who could only "garner applause from lunch ladies" and who therefore "must disappear".

Alexandrescu notes of Herz: "The war cancelled him as a dramatic author. His comedies had a light satirical note, they were not profound theater but rather one of the Parisian boulevardier kind, albeit of good quality, like those comedies by de Flers and Caillavet." These years also marked new contributions to the revue genre, for which he found a new patron, the actor-producer Constantin Tănase. Herz's "heavyweight" role in the interwar revue was recorded in theatrical verse by a colleague, Ion Pribeagu. During 1923, Tănase appeared as Acarul Păun in Herz's Care dă mai mult? ("Who Pays More?"), a satirical take on the railway catastrophe at Vintileasca. The 1924 hits Ce-are a face? ("What's It to You?") and Pân'aici ("Up to Here") were again showcased by Tănase. Both were collective works, with Herz credited alongside "Durstoy" (or "Dur Stoy"), later revealed as a writing duo formed by Gheorghe Druma and Victor Stoicovici.

Herz also attempted a return to mainstream theater with the 1925 plays Aripi frânte ("Broken Wings") and Seară pierdută ("Wasted Evening"). The former, written in verse, depicted events from the life of Ștefăniță, a 17th-century Moldavian exile in the Holy Roman Empire. Also in 1925, alongside Dragomirescu, Brătescu-Voinești, Rebreanu and V. Al. Jean, Herz was an executive of Filmul Românesc society, dedicated to the promotion and moral review of Romanian cinema productions. Around that time, he became editor-in-chief of Dimineața daily. This allowed him to publish a lavish praise of his own Păianjenul, which was being produced by Aurel Ion Maican at Brăila City Theater. Also that year, Maican directed a new production of Mărgeluș. Moving on from Dimineața, Herz worked as a broadcaster for the newly inaugurated Radio Company, with a series of interviews with actors. Later contributions for Tănase's revues were Din toată inima ("With a Full Heart") and Între ciocan și nicovală ("Between a Rock and a Hard Place"), co-authored with Nicolae Vlădoianu; both were performed by and his troupe in 1928. The Herz–Vlădoianu collaboration used talents such as Alexandru Giugaru and a number by the Romanian version of Mutt and Jeff; its "dizzying rhythm" garnered "sidesplitting laughter". Alongside Vlădoianu and Nicolae Kirițescu, Herz, using the pen name "Puck", also wrote the show Negru pe alb ("Black on White"), made famous for starring an African American dancer, Josephine Baker.

His final works for the stage included the more conventional comedy Omul de zăpadă ("Snowman"). It depicted the unscrupled playboy Mihai Corvin finding real love with the inexperienced Viorica. Taken up by the National Theater Bucharest in December 1927, it was also performed at provincial theaters. The main production featured Nicolae Soreanu and Ion Finteșteanu; Herz himself appeared in his own play in the touring version. Omul de zăpadă was followed by another play, Încurcă lume ("The Fumbler"), commissioned by Alexandrescu for his Teatrul Mic. He was involved in its 1929 staging, appearing in the lead role. It was published alongside volumes of short prose: Noapte bună ("Good Night", 1929) and Om discret ("A Discreet Man", 1931). His former colleagues at Dimineața recommended the latter as "healthy humor and sound literature", "a prized contribution to out humorous prose." Herz's final contributions as a translator include a Romanian rendition of William Shakespeare's Much Ado About Nothing. It was done from the French version, and staged by the National Theater in 1928–1929, with Gusty as director.

=== Final years ===
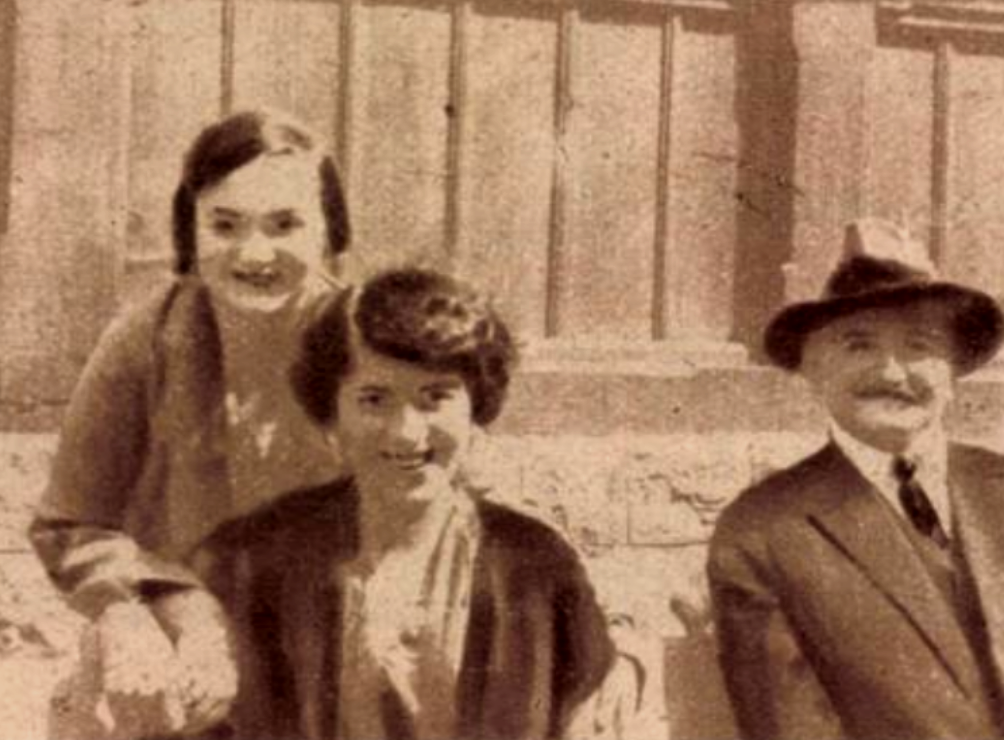
From left: Kuki de Herz, Marta Rădulescu, and Major Gheuca (organizer of the Romanian writers' retreat) in Bușteni, August 1933

In June 1930, Herz became manager of the National Theater Craiova. According to Massoff, he took this job out of sheer necessity, and it proved a "great misfortune", impeding his writing. While there, "the Baron" undertook efforts to secure a new building, worked to improve relations between management and actors, hired new actors and established a choir. Funding for the theater was cut due to the ongoing economic crisis; Herz responded by paying actors' wages from his own pocket. In December 1934, the satirists at Veselia magazine ridiculed Herz for allowing his actors to perform in Bucharest revues, and also for using the Craiova stage for self-promotion: "The [season's] opening show will comprise fragments from Păianjenul, Omul de zăpadă, Mărgeluș etc., as read out by the author himself". His adolescent daughter Kuki became a troupe regular, appearing as Martha in The Father and as Petre the Dwarf in Aripi frânte. In 1933, she vacationed with her father in Bușteni, at a retreat organized by the SSR. She befriended novelist Marta Rădulescu, who described her as "Craiova Theater's child prodigy". The dramatist's son, Nonu, trained as a violinist.

From 1932, journalist Eugen Constant had been highly critical of Herz's management in Craiova, alleging that he was "entirely adverse to the Oltenian psyche", a "character with a Germanic coat of arms and the reputation of a streetwise authors of revues." Constant claimed that the institution was excessively promoting German plays, with "nudist displays and libidinous gestures", and also implied that Herz was guilty of financial irregularities. In December 1932, the nationalist newspaper Calendarul reported with satisfaction that Herz was under investigation by the Craiova prosecutor's office; according to this source, Herz still enjoyed protection from his hierarchical superior, Alexandru Mavrodi, who "provides homes to all the con artists, and makes a mockery of our national theaters, to the minorities' enjoyment."

In November 1934, an unsigned piece in Curentul alleged that Herz was "terrorizing" actors, who had not received payment since June, and that his pattern of behavior evidenced insanity. According to this report, the entire Craiova troupe went on strike, and some of its members attempted to storm into Herz's home on Unirei Highway; the incidents prompted an inquiry. As noted by Gyr, "the Baron" could indeed prove himself coarse and abusive in dealing with his staff. Herz himself suspected that his activity was reported on by two fellow dramatists, Ion Marin Sadoveanu and Victor Ion Popa, though the latter rejected such rumors. Prospects of bankruptcy and political intrigue eventually led to his sacking in 1935. The Craiova Theater was ultimately shut down by government that same year, and remained closed to 1942.

One of Herz's stories was adapted into a 1934 talking picture, Insula Șerpilor—set in, and named after, Snake Island, it fictionalized the adventures a famous brigand, Terente. Insula Șerpilor, now a lost film, is only known through its generally positive reviews, though it was also panned by Ghiță Ionescu in Cuvântul Liber. That same year, Încurcă lume was taken up by the National Theater Cluj, generating "an evening's worth of hearty laughter" on its premiere there. According to writer Traian T. Lalescu, it was "merely a farce", but characters appeared as "more viable than the protagonists of foreign farces". In summer 1935, Izbânda Garden hosted performances of Domnul de la ora 5 ("Mr. Five o'Clock"), adapted by Herz from a revue by Pierre Weber, and with Velimir Maximilian as a lead.

Herz in one of his final photographs

In late 1935, Herz was living at his own villa in Floreasca, but had left it unplastered, and was considering selling it, because of his financial woes; he confessed his troubles to Rampa reporter Jack Berariu, noting that he was working on two lighthearted comedies, Mincinoasa ("Lady Liar") and Oul lui Columb ("Egg of Columbus"). His last known play was Unchiul lui Noață ("Noață's Uncle"), produced by Alexandrescu for Teatrul Vesel in early 1936, with Grigore Vasiliu Birlic as Noață, the unassuming and ridiculous, but calculated and intelligent, property caretaker. V. Timuș of Rampa celebrated it as an "honest comedy" marking the return of Herz, "as spiritual as ever, as lively as ever". He noted that the lead role fit Vasiliu Birlic "like a glove". The text was lambasted by Ion Dimitrescu of Curentul for being "very rudimentary", in particular for its dwelling on misogynistic observations and puns. Dimitrescu expressed a wish that Herz would experience a "quick jolting out of his theatrical descent."

Herz and Alexandrescu also worked on another comedy, Musafirii lui Răstocea ("Răstocea's Guests"), which was left unfinished. This stage of his life came to an abrupt end when Herz's diabetes, which had been diagnosed in Craiova, was made worse by his return to writing and financial distress, both of which consumed him. Kuki reportedly administered his insulin shots. Herz spoke to Berariu about his belief that he would not live to see his children growing up, and also expressed regrets about not having stayed in military school, since an army career "would have prevented my nationality and my religion from being a topic of discussion." He died on the evening of March 9, 1936, after helping his daughter with homework. His reported cause of death was an episode of hemoptysis. He was buried on March 12, sharing a tomb with his mother on Plot 26 of Bellu cemetery, Bucharest.

== Legacy ==
According to Massoff, Herz's death was "unexpected and premature", just as "the Baron" seemed to be making a recovery. In 1940, Eftimiu wrote that Herz "passed on at an age when people shouldn't die. [...] People should die before forty—or after sixty." This meant that "the universe has deprived A. de Herz of his revenge [...] at a moment when he was just resuming his efforts". As noted by his widow, he had left four plays unfinished, including Oul lui Columb, which was already reserved by Bulandra Theater. In 1937, Marconi Garden of Bucharest continued to run works by Herz, including Fustele de la minister ("Ministry Skirts"), an adaptation from Weber and Maurice Hennequin. It starred Vasiliu Birlic, Jules Cazaban, Beate Fredanov, and Mișu Fotino.

Herz's death had left his family destitute, his townhouse and personal library having been repossessed by creditors. The books (including autographed volumes by Rebreanu, Slavici, Dimitrie Anghel, I. Dragoslav, Cincinat Pavelescu, Mihail Sadoveanu, and Panait Istrati) were auctioned off in April 1936, alongside some of Herz's own manuscripts; buyers included literary scholar Șerban Cioculescu. In May 1937, Claudia Millian published a plea for public donations, including from the SSR, to help Herz's homeless widow and orphans. In January 1939, reporter Radu A. Sterescu noted that Herz had been inexplicably forgotten by managers and producers, even though "his plays were admirable 'recipes'." He argued that this indifference was owed to his "German origin", as well as to the "saddening posthumous revenge" of his influential enemies. By then, controversy had erupted in Ținutul Timiș, where the local branch of ASTRA had agreed to sponsor productions of Herz's plays. A staff chronicler at Înnoirea newspaper viewed the decision as morally incompatible with ASTRA's mission.

Later in 1939, during Romania's antisemitic turn, Gyr insisted that Herz did not "carry in his blood the despicable imprint of the Semitic race", being "the son of a German baron"; Herz's "aggressive dialectics" and "cynical mood", he argued, "covered up his warm and vibrant soul". Herz's original plays were again performed during World War II: in November 1939, the municipal theater of Focșani produced Păianjenul, specifically as a tribute to its deceased author. In the early 1940s, Alexandrescu produced a new version of Mărgeluș for Comoedia Theater and Omul de zăpadă was taken up by the National Theater Cluj, on location in Timișoara. Romeo Lăzărescu's company, Teatrul Măscărici, also took up Încurcă lume in 1942. This version marked the stage debut of actress Olly Eftimiu.

In October 1946, France's Théâtre des Bouffes-Parisiens featured a production of Încurcă lume. Reviewing a Bucharest reprisal of Omul de zăpadă in early 1947, Pătrașcu Ion Sârbul commented that Herz's reputation in local drama was unshakeable, his style a "well-conceived balance" between Ion Luca Caragiale's "mordant wit" and Vasile Alecsandri's "parental and naive caresses". Productions of Herz's plays were put on hold during the first stages of the Romanian communist regime, with theatrologist Simion Alterescu noting that his overall work was in the "bourgeois, [...] schematic, diversionary drama"; by 1958, his romances were retaken on Romanian radio stations, though, as noted at the time by journalist G. Cristobald, the musical producers failed to credit him. His work for the stage was again considered in the late 1960s. In a 1966 colloquium, actor Niki Atanasiu observed that amateur "people's theaters" were keen on staging Omul de zăpadă, "in which I myself appeared as a youth, but which I cannot imagine will contribute anything towards enlightening the masses." The following year, chronicler Ilina Grigorovici urged theater managers to resume production of Romanian plays, adding: "Evidently we do not recommend that A. de Hertz should be added to the program". In a 1973 interview, Craiova-based dramatist Ion Dezideriu Sîrbu argued that Herz's plays were "entirely buried into irrelevancy".

Lilly de Herz died the same year; on Adolf's commemoration in March 1976, both his children were still alive. In that commemorative context, Herz's writer friend Mircea Ștefănescu published an article evoking Herz mainly as an actor: "And what an actor! Theatrically uninhibited in that charming way, dynamic to the point of making the show revolve around him as a living focus." Also in 1976, the revived Craiova National Theater included Omul de zăpadă, directed by Valentina Balogh, in its season's program. In his review of this "pleasant surprise", critic Ionuț Niculescu noted: "Assimilated with minor early-century dramaturgy, with his special interest in modern comedy, Herz seemed to only present interest for theatrical historians." In 1978, Sandu Anastasescu and Harry Eliad rewrote Încurcă lume for an acclaimed production at the Municipal Theater in Ploiești. In March 1983, the Romanian Television premiered its version of Încurcă lume, with Mihai Fotino and Radu Beligan in the lead roles. It was welcomed as a "pleasant" rediscovery by the staff writers at Luceafărul.
