= Panait Cerna =

Romanian writer and academic

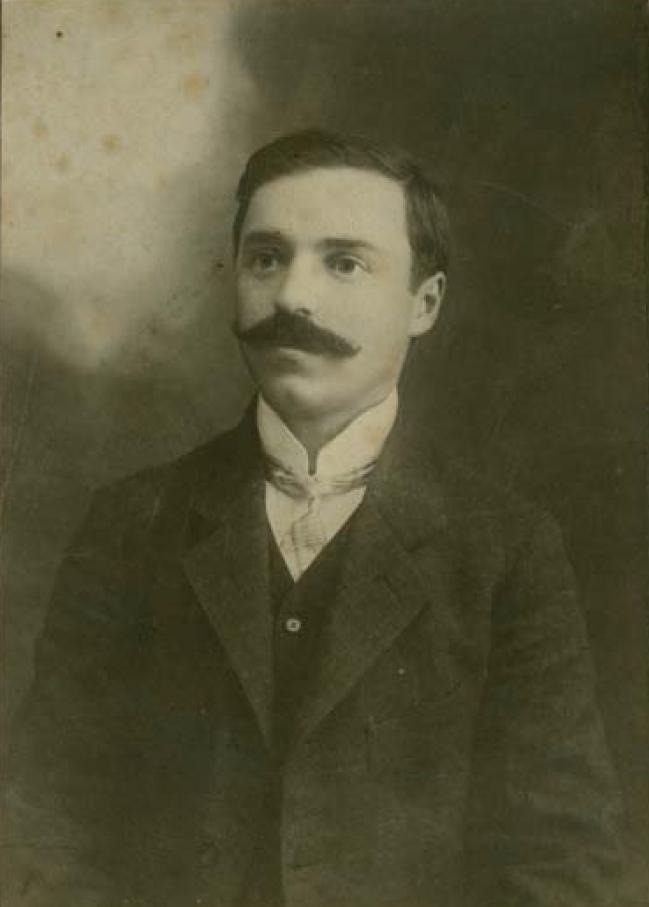
- Born: Panayot Stanchov or Panait Stanciov; August or September 1881; Cerna, Romania
- Died: March 26, 1913 (aged 31); Leipzig
- Occupations: poet, philosopher, literary critic, translator, journalist
- Writing career
- Pen name: Panait Cerna
- Period: 1897–1913
- Genres: lyric poetry, epic poetry, essay
- Literary movement: classicism, neoclassicism, symbolism, Junimea, Sămănătorul

Panait Cerna (Romanian pronunciation: [panaˈit ˈt͡ʃerna]; Bulgarian: Панайот Черна, Panayot Cherna, born Panayot Stanchov or Panait Staciov; August 26 or September 25, 1881 – March 26, 1913) was a Romanian poet, philosopher, literary critic and translator. A native speaker of Bulgarian, Cerna nonetheless wrote in Romanian, and developed a traditionalist style which was connected with classicism and neoclassicism. Praised by the conservative literary society Junimea, he was promoted by its leader Titu Maiorescu, as well as by Maiorescu's disciples Mihail Dragomirescu and Simion Mehedinți. Cerna became the group's main representative during its decline, contributing to both major Junimist magazines, Convorbiri Literare and Convorbiri Critice. He also contributed pieces to the traditionalist magazine Sămănătorul, and was briefly affiliated with other literary journals.

A graduate of the University of Bucharest, Cerna completed his studies in the German Empire. There, he attended the University of Berlin and Leipzig University, befriending the self-exiled Romanian dramatist Ion Luca Caragiale and the literary critic Paul Zarifopol. Cerna died in Leipzig at the age of thirty-one, after a long battle with tuberculosis.

Along with various love poems, Panait Cerna's writings also evince his intellectual pursuits. This intellectual characteristic earned him a dedicated following, but was criticized by many of his peers, who found it artificial and outdated.

== Biography ==
=== Early life ===
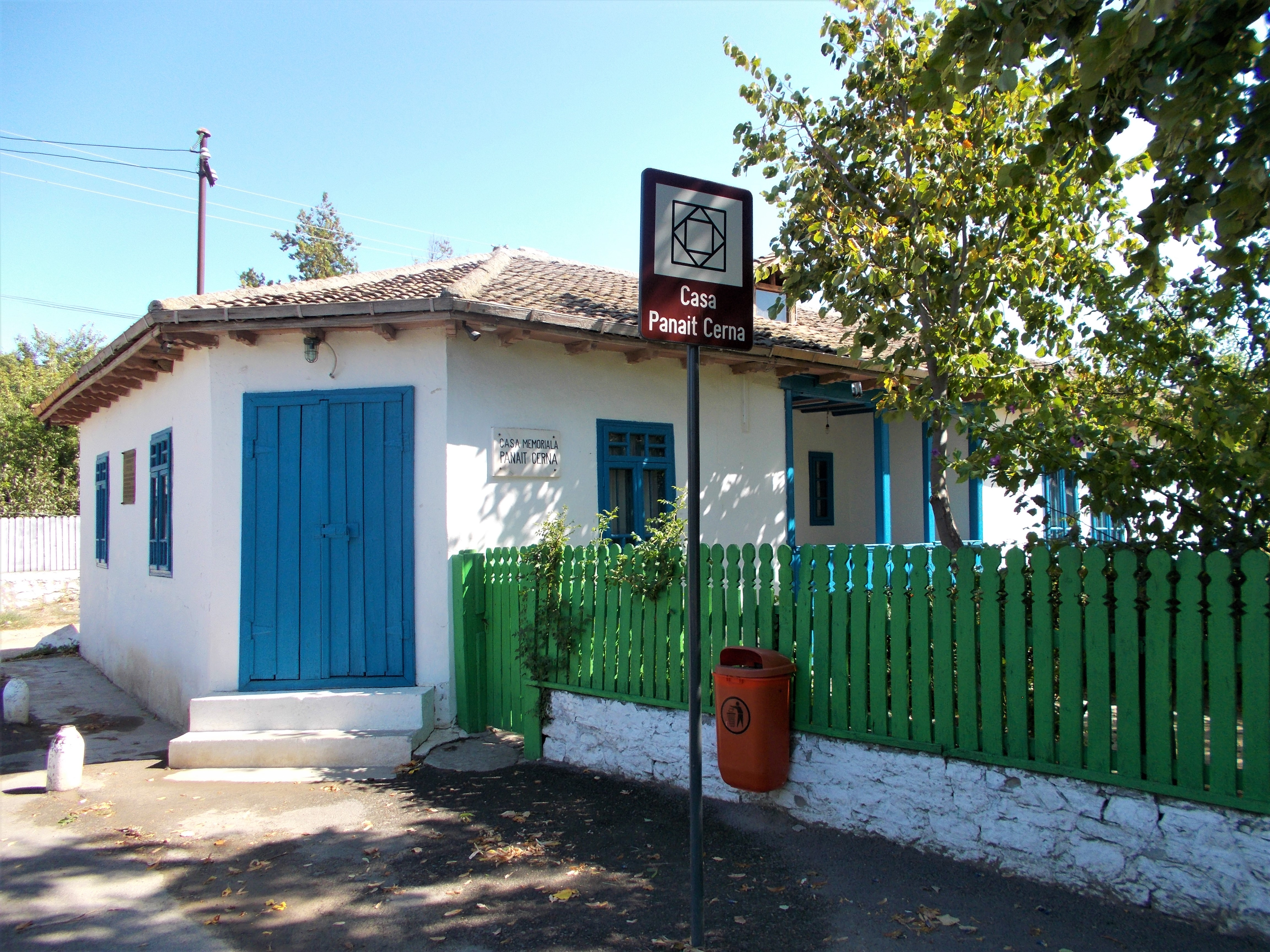
Panait Cerna Memorial House in Cerna, Tulcea

Cerna's early name, rendered in Bulgarian as Панайот Станчов, was commonly transliterated into Romanian as Panait Stanciov, Stancov, Stanciof or Stancioff. The poet's preferred name alluded to Cerna, his birthplace in Tulcea County, Northern Dobruja.

Panait Cerna's father was an ethnic Bulgarian schoolteacher, also named Panayot Stachov (Panait Stanciov). He settled in Cerna and married Maria Tașcu. The daughter of local peasants, she was of Aromanian or of Bulgarian origin. Shortly before Maria gave birth to their son, Romanian administration began taking over in previously Ottoman-ruled Northern Dobruja. Stanchov, who was a Bulgarian nationalist, refused to accept this change and left for the Principality of Bulgaria, leaving his family behind. Consequently, Cerna never met his father. By Cerna's own account, his childhood was marked by acute poverty and social isolation: "[I was] told to tutor and learn in cold, unfriendly rooms. For a long time, we lived in a house on the outskirts, which was avoided by other men, since a rumor had spread that ghosts haunted its rooms. Can you imagine living in the middle of winter, without a fire on, with doors that barely close, with windows that are glued with paper? A person made of iron would still feel cold down to the bone."

Although his links to Bulgarian culture were weakened by his father's departure, Cerna, who was baptized in the Bulgarian Greek Catholic Church, became fluent in Bulgarian. According to literary critic George Călinescu, he always had some difficulties conversing in Romanian, but could write it with ease.

After completing primary school in his native village, he graduated from a high school in the Danube port of Brăila, then enrolled at the Faculty of Letters and Philosophy in Bucharest. He was also attending lectures at the Faculty of Chemistry and Physics. Cerna debuted as a poet in 1897, at the age of sixteen, when his Trecutul ("The Past")—an adaptation of a piece by Nikolaus Lenau—was published in George Coşbuc's Foaia Interesantă magazine. His first original poem, Orientale ("Orientals"), saw print two years later in the magazine Carmen.

=== Junimea years ===
Soon after reaching the capital, Cerna became involved in political debates and the literary environment. These early activities are recorded in a 1904 series of articles in the student paper Tipuri și Ticuri, where a P. Stanciov is the object of satire. By that time, he was discovered by Junimea, and began collaborating with Convorbiri Literare, a magazine led by Simion Mehedinți. After 1903, Cerna contributed to Sămănătorul, and his poems also appeared sporadically in other publications, including Floare Albastră and Revista Modernă.

Despite ongoing financial difficulties, Cerna graduated from university in 1906. His thesis was passed with a magna cum laude qualifier. He was by then seriously ill with tuberculosis, and sought a change in climate. Cerna spent much of this period traveling through the Old Kingdom, and several times visited regions of the Southern Carpathians, in particular the area of Rucăr, the Bucegi Mountains, and the Jiu Valley. As Călinescu notes, he had bought himself a horse from a Rucăr local on credit, and failed to deliver the promised sum on time.

Cerna's love of rural life, together with what Călinescu describes as a "social preoccupation", made him an outspoken opponent of the way in which the authorities handled the peasant uprising of 1907. That year, as Mihail Dragomirescu parted with Mehedinţi to establish Convorbiri Critice, which advertised a Junimist agenda while standing against Convorbiri Literare, Cerna became one of his main collaborators. The group of Convorbiri Critice writers also included D. Nanu, Corneliu Moldovanu, Emil Gârleanu, I. Dragoslav, and George Vâlsan. In 1908, he decided to continue his studies in the German Empire. The decision was influenced and encouraged by Junimea and its leader Titu Maiorescu, who, as Minister of Education granted him a scholarship. Călinescu describes this as a sign of late Junimist elitism, a view which implied that all literary men should be academics. This, he argues, was one of the few areas in which Junimea still differed from Sămănătorul, which was more open to less elitist environments.

Cerna visited Heidelberg University, but, following the advice of Maiorescu, decided in favor of the University of Berlin, where he studied philosophy, English and German language literature (1908–1910). Around 1909, he first came into contact with the Caragiales, and, according to the dramatist's own testimony, tutored his son, the future poet Luca Caragiale, providing his "scientific education". Ion Luca Caragiale described Cerna as "a distinguished scientist and a great lover of music". The two writers met a second time in Leipzig, in 1910, when Cerna declared himself captivated by Caragiale, whom he described as "one of the richest intelligent minds to have ever been produced by our nation." Two years later, Cerna enthusiastically welcomed the literary debut of Caragiale's other son, Mateiu.

=== Studies abroad and death ===
From late 1910 to early 1912, Cerna was at Leipzig University, where he attended courses held by the philosophers and psychologists Wilhelm Wundt, Eduard Spranger, and Hans Volkelt. Wundt left an enduring impression on his Romanian student. In a letter home, Cerna described his modest appearance, which he claimed recalled that of "decrepit" Orthodox members of the Romanian Jewish community, adding: "But I do love this decrepit exterior beyond measure ..." Volkelt guided Cerna's research in the scientific field, and coordinated his PhD thesis of 1913, Die Gedankenlyrik (German for "Contemplative Poetry"). According to Călinescu, Cerna's work stated the primacy of "natural ideas" over reasoning, and concluded that "ideas have the purpose of signaling the problematic tensions of the soul." Zarifopol wrote that Cerna was upset over having himself parted with writing poetry, and came to be preoccupied by Maiorescu's German-language dictum: In der Poesie ist der Gedanke ein verfluchtes Ding ("An idea is a damned thing when it comes to poetry"). Panait Cerna's first volume of collected poetry was published at home in 1910, and, two years later, resulted in the author being made a co-recipient of the Romanian Academy's Vasile Adamachi Award. Some of his new poems were still being published by Convorbiri Literare in 1911.

Panait Cerna died in Leipzig, shortly after receiving his diploma. Zarifopol was present when Cerna succumbed, and recorded that Maiorescu's views on poetry where preoccupied his friend even on his deathbed. The poet was buried in the German city, and later exhumed for burial in Bucharest's Bellu Cemetery.

== Literary contribution ==
Cerna was a traditionalist poet, listed by Călinescu among the contributors to Romanian literature whose work "steers toward classicism", as do those of Dragomirescu, Mehedinţi, Henri Sanielevici, D. Nanu, Ion Trivale, Cincinat Pavelescu, Corneliu Moldovanu, Mihail Codreanu, Alexandru Davila, and George Murnu. In this account, Cerna is one in a group of "conceptual" poets, all of whom were connected with Dragomirescu. For part of his life, Cerna was also formally committed to Symbolism and the local Symbolist movement, whose aesthetic ideals he merged with his lyrical style, and sought to recover part of the Romantic legacy. He was thus known as the translator of works by Romantic poets, as well as for adopting a Messianic and Humanist perspective on life (notably present in his poems Floare și genune, "Flower and Chasm"; Zile de durere, "Days of Sorrow"; and Plânsetul lui Adam, "Adam's Sobbing").

Literary historian Tudor Vianu notes the influence exercised on Cerna and other traditionalists by Mihai Eminescu, Romania's major mid-19th-century classicist and Junimist poet. Modernist theorist Eugen Lovinescu also believes that the "matter in which [Cerna] worked" was largely "dominated by Eminescu." He also cautions that there is a major difference between the two: Cerna is an optimist, while Eminescu most often projected a pessimistic attitude. According to Zarifopol, the poet considered himself an "improved follower" of Eminescu. Cerna was also a late admirer of Lord Byron, a main figure of English Romanticism, and translated from his Childe Harold. One of Cerna's poems was an epic piece inspired by the Book of Genesis, where Adam confronts God. Titled Plânsetul lui Adam, it builds on themes which recalled Byron's 1821 play Cain, and constituted an interrogation of divine laws.

In Plânsetul lui Adam and various other pieces, Panait Cerna (called a "reflexive poet" by contemporary critic Ilarie Chendi) sought to reconcile poetry and philosophy, thus creating a hybrid form of conceptual poetry. Eugen Lovinescu proposed that, although praised by Cerna's contemporaries, this goal was "mediocre", and that the literature it produced "does not express and does not suggest profound spiritual states, but, on the contrary, it expresses by means of rhetorical dialectic not only that which can be expressed, but also that which can be proven." Paul Zarifopol, who notes that Cerna particularly treasured the classicist poets Friedrich Schiller, Louise-Victorine Ackermann and Jean-Marie Guyau, as well as the Parnassian Sully Prudhomme, recounted their disagreement when it came to Caragiale, whom Cerna enjoyed only for his power of "observation", but whom he argued lacked "concepts". For Zarifopol, this statement, made with "a fanatical and dogmatic pathos", evidenced a moment of "academic foolishness" in Cerna's career.

Călinescu, who criticizes the poet for his difficulties with the language, describes him as "not accomplished". Elaborating on this, he states: "[Cerna is] declamatory, banal and dry in his use of metaphors, although he displays a touch of the sublime here and there." Lovinescu thought many of the expressions Cerna used in his poetry to be "unacceptable", and argued that they were characterized by banality. This assessment was itself contested by Călinescu, who argued that the lyrics in questions are "actually the acceptable ones", and that the awkward wordings "are entirely lost in lyrical fluency." Among the writings forming the subject of this disagreement was Cerna's Din depărtare ("From Far Away"), which Lovinescu believed was marked by the use of repetitive and banal poetic images:

Nu ți-am vorbit vrodată, și pe ferești deschise
Nu ți-am trimis buchete, stăpâna mea din vise,
Ci numai de departe te-am urmărit adese,
Iluminat de gânduri nespuse, ne-nțelese ...

Translation:

I never spoke with you, and through open windows
I never sent you bouquets, mistress of my dreams,
But merely have been often watching you from afar,
Illuminated by untold, unknown words

The subject of unrequited love was one of the major ones in Cerna's lyric poems and, Călinescu argues, it evoked his actual experience with women, as "the regret of not having lived through the great mystery of love." These pieces, the critic notes, point to the influence of classicist authors such as Eminescu, Dante Aligheri, and Giacomo Leopardi (the latter poet had also been quoted in Cerna's Die Gedankenlyrik). One of the pieces, written from the perspective of a man who has once failed to gain the object of his affection, features the lyrics:

Cărarea mea subțire se umple de lumină,
Încât mă-mpac cu viața-mi și uit că-mi ești străină.
Ce vrea și unde merge un fulger? Cui ce-i pasă! ...
Destul că face noaptea, o clipă, mai frumoasă.

Translation:

My thin path is being flooded in light,
So that I reconcile with my life and forget you are a stranger.
What does a bolt want, and where does it go? Who should even care! ...
It is enough that, for a moment, it makes the night more beautiful.

While rejecting Cerna's conceptual approach, Lovinescu admired his style, for "the amplitude through which [the sentiment] is laid out in vast chimes and compact constructions of rhetorical stanzas." Such features, he concluded, surpassed "everything ever written in our country". For George Călinescu, Cerna's "euphoric thirst for life" recalled the work of Parnassian and Symbolist author Alexandru Macedonski, but was tempered by "the mellow anemia of the phthisic." One of his better-known pieces from the series of love poems read:

Noi ne-am cuprins de-o flacără curată,
Ce niciodată n-are să apuie -
Și nu furăm norocul nimănuie,
Ci în iubire tânără, bogată,
Îmbrățișăm pământul, lumea toată.

Translation:

We were brought together by a clear flame,
Which shall never damp down—
And we steal luck away from no one,
But in young, rich love,
We embrace the Earth, the whole world.

Cerna's protest over the violent repression of the 1907 revolt was lyricized in several contexts. In one such indignant piece, Cerna called on Peace not to arrive until the social issue would be solved. In Zile de durere, he appeals to the Sun to wash out the blood of peasant victims:

Usucă iute câmpurile roșii,
Să nu priceapă-n groapa lor strămoșii
Al cui a fost - și cine l-a vărsat.

Translation:

Be quick to dry the red fields,
So that the ancestors in their graves could not grasp
Whose it was—and who it was that shed it.

== Legacy ==
Panait Cerna's lifetime success and literary fame made him the target of adulation among his fellow traditionalists, a camp which united various Junimea affiliates and Sămănătorul contributors. According to Călinescu, this group saw him as Romania's answer to Schiller and Percy Bysshe Shelley. Junimea saw in him one of its most important members of the early 20th century, while several historians note that he was so only because, at that stage, the literary society was declining. Mehedinţi's 1914 account of the Junimist promotion of the "original manifestations of Romanian culture" listed Cerna alongside Alexandru G. Florescu and other minor writers. Literary historian Z. Ornea argues that this evidenced not just a decline in standards, but also Mehedinți's "tastelessness". Also according to Ornea, the association with Dragomirescu was also characteristic for the Junimist twilight, given that this circle had failed to impose "a new literary direction", and was tributary to the legacy of various traditionalist groups. At the same time, both Dragomirescu and his disciple Ion Trivale upheld him as a model to follow, equating him with the mid-19th century classicist Grigore Alexandrescu. Zarifopol deplores Cerna's submission to traditionalist and classicist goals, arguing that it eventually ruined Cerna as a poet and made him unhappy.

The poet's adoption of a mainstream approach to poetry also pleased his public, and, Călinescu notes, schoolbooks of the day celebrated him as a Romanian classic while completely ignoring more controversial Symbolists such as Macedonski and Dimitrie Anghel. His contributions have helped shaped the style of 20th-century poets with traditionalist tendencies from different schools. Among them are the socialist Alexandru Toma, later known as an official poet of Communist Romania, and Sămănătorul's Ion Sân-Giorgiu, whose career later took him through an Expressionist stage and eventually to fascist politics. Demostene Botez, another author to have been influenced by Cerna's style, dedicated his mentor a poem which read:

Un gigant ai fost pe-o lume plină numai cu pitici,
Un luceafăr singuratic între-atâția licurici.

Translation:

A giant you have been in a world filled only with dwarfs,
A lonely evening star among so many fire flies.

In his essay Din registrul ideilor gingașe ("From the Register of Gentle Ideas"), where he satirizes the Romanian public's reception of literature, Zarifopol looks into the problems faced by Cerna in satisfying his readers. Using one of Cerna's own accounts as the basis for this analysis, he notes that a group of his young "female admirers" where unpleasantly surprised to find out that their idol was "short, pudgy, wide-necked and ruddy-faced." He writes: "the girls ... were thus in full agreement with the philosophical tradition which, since the old days, has set as a supreme ideal a mosaic of perfections that is naive and unlikely."

Like Lovinescu, other advocates of modernist literature rejected most of Cerna's contributions. One of the first to have done so is Ovid Densusianu, who stated his belief that an artist's work should be separated from his life. Lovinescu, who commented on Densusianu and his thoughts on Cerna, opined that Densusianu had a tendency to reject all poets who registered popular success, and that he treated Dimitrie Anghel's work in much the same way.

The poet's house in Cerna is presently a museum, dedicated in part to his memory, and also housing a permanent exhibit dedicated to the traditional arts and crafts of Tulcea County. It also features a bust of the poet. The county library in Tulcea city is named after him, as are a high school in Brăila and streets in Bucharest, Brăila, Bistrița, Hunedoara, Lugoj, and Petroșani. The local authorities in Tulcea County organize an annual Panait Cerna National Poetry and Essay Contest.
