= I. Dragoslav =

Romanian writer

Ion V. Ivaciuc Ion Sumanariu Ivanciuc
- Born: June 14, 1875; Fălticeni, Romania
- Died: May 5, 1928 (aged 52); Fălticeni
- Occupations: short story writer, poet, journalist
- Writing career
- Pen name: I. Dragoslav, Ion Dragoslav
- Period: 1890-1954
- Genres: children's literature, fantasy, mythopoeia, lyric poetry, memoir, novella, sketch story
- Literary movement: Sămănătorul, Covorbiri Critice, Sburătorul

I. Dragoslav or Ion Dragoslav (Romanian pronunciation: [iˈon draɡoslav]), pen names of Ion V. Ivaciuc or Ion Sumanariu Ivanciuc ([iˈon sumaˈnarju ivanˈt͡ʃʲuk]; June 14, 1875 – May 5, 1928), was a Romanian writer. His presence on the local literary scene meant successive affiliations with various competing venues: having debuted with the traditionalist and nationalist magazine Sămănătorul, he later connected the eclectically conservative Convorbiri Critice group of Mihail Dragomirescu with the Romanian Symbolist movement leaders Alexandru Macedonski and Ion Minulescu, before moving close to the modernist trend of Eugen Lovinescu and his Sburătorul.

Noted for his contributions to fantasy, children's literature and memoir, Dragoslav defied inclusion in the genres illustrated by his public commitments. His work, often described as picturesque but mediocre, is primarily indebted to Ion Creangă, through him, to folkloric tradition.

== Biography ==
A native of Fălticeni to a peasant family, Ivaciuc-Dragoslav completed his secondary studies in the city, where he was in the same class as future writers Lovinescu and Mihail Sadoveanu. Largely an autodidact, he made his debut in writing in 1903, when his contribution was hosted by the leading traditionalist venue, Sămănătorul. He is known to have been studying Letters and Law at the University of Bucharest during 1904. During those years, he published his first volumes, the lyric poetry collection Pe drumul pribegiei ("On the Path of Wanderers"), followed by the short story volumes Facerea lumiii ("The Origin of the World") and La han la Trei ulcele ("At the Three Pitcher Inn").

I. Dragoslav's works made an impression on two rival literary men, Mihail Dragomirescu and Alexandru Macedonski. As he himself recalled in a 1920 article, he found an early mentor in Macedonski, who guided his early literary career and provided him with advice upon their first meeting in Bucharest. Also before 1910, Dragoslav began contributing to Covorbiri Critice magazine and attending its club, which Dragomirescu was hosting at his Bucharest home. Previously a follower of the conservative literary society Junimea, Dragomirescu had been directing his efforts toward assembling together some of his former colleagues, alongside writers from traditionalist and neo-romantic groups like Făt Frumos (Emil Gârleanu, Anastasie Mândru, Corneliu Moldovanu and D. Nanu among them), and more eclectic ones—Panait Cerna, Gheorghe Vâlsan, as well as Dragoslav himself. In addition to these authors, people who frequented Dragomirescu's circle before its 1910 disestablishment included Symbolist figures (Minulescu, Dimitrie Anghel, Al. T. Stamatiad) or writers of various other orientations (Cincinat Pavelescu, Liviu Rebreanu), joined by visual artists Iosif Iser, Costin Petrescu and George Talaz. The eclectic circle became a post-Junimist venue and a center of opposition to Sămănătorul, but, according to literary historian Z. Ornea, failed to impose the "new literary school" imagined by Dragomirescu.

Dragoslav was still living mostly in Fălticeni, where, according to literary historian George Călinescu, he lived the life of a bohemian and treasured the drinking culture, profiting from the fact that a relative of his was a tavern owner. He was a regular presence at the pub La Plosca Verde ("At the Green Wineskin") in Iași. Călinescu also notes that, although he boasted a rustic lifestyle, Dragoslav's townhouse was "far from a miserable mud hut", and that Dragoslav raised ducks, geese and pigs. Dragoslav made frequent trips outside Fălticeni "with a giant satchel of manuscripts", seeking out fellow writers and addressing them, coarsely, as măi frate-miu ("brother o' mine").

Dragoslav pursued a diverse activity in the literary press, and also published his work in, among others, Făt Frumos, Flacăra, Luceafărul, Ramuri, Universul daily and Viața Literară. In 1909, having published Fata popei ("The Priest's Daughter") and Povestea copilăriei ("The Story of Childhood"), he joined the Romanian Writers' Society, a professional association founded by Anghel, Gârleanu and Pavelescu in 1908. In 1910, he put out the collections Novele ("Novellas") and Povestiri alese ("Selected Stories"), followed in 1911 by Povestea trăznetului ("The Story of Thunder").

For a while in 1912, Dragoslav was affiliated with the Symbolist and modernist venue Insula, edited by Ion Minulescu. According to critic Paul Cernat, Dragoslav was by then "a dissident Sămănătorist", and, with Constantin Beldie, the only person from the Insula group not to have been a Symbolist. That same year, the writer was among those who welcomed Macedonski back from his extended trip to France (itself caused by literary scandals). He viewed the event as an opportunity for restoring Macedonski's prestige, and, in a Rampa article, stated: " 'Macedonski has arrived'; this word is on everyone's lips and sounds as if the man has risen from the dead." Together with Stamatiad and Mândru, Dragoslav was instrumental in bridging the gap between Macedonski's Literatorul and Convorbiri Literare, successfully urging Dragomirescu to give his colleague a positive review.

His volumes followed each other in quick succession: Flori și povești ("Flowers and Stories") in 1911; Volintirii ("The Volunteers") and Împăratul Rogojină ("Emperor Doormat") in 1912; Povești de sărbători ("Holiday Stories") in 1913; Povești de Crăciun ("Christmas Stories"), in 1914. In 1915, he put out the selected stories volumes Sărăcuțul ("Poor Little Fella"). Several of these books saw print in Orăștie, a town then outside the Kingdom of Romania, in Austro-Hungarian-ruled Transylvania.

At an early stage of World War I, when Romania had not yet joined up with the Entente, Dragoslav affiliated with Libertatea, a gazette put out by the controversial agitator and Symbolist poet Alexandru Bogdan-Pitești, which campaigned in favor of the Central Powers and was reportedly financed by the German Empire. However, as the Central Powers occupied the Romanian south and the Romanian front drew close to Fălticeni, Dragoslav reportedly spend much time at the local high school, reading to wounded soldiers.

During the early interwar period, Dragoslav affiliated with Eugen Lovinescu's Sburătorul modernist club, and, in 1921, put out his definitive selection of novellas and sketch stories. By the 1920s, he had fallen severely ill with a disease of the liver, argued by Călinescu to have been the result of binge drinking. He was hospitalized for ascites, and his peritoneal cavity was drained of over 6 liters of bodily fluid. He was again hospitalized at the Colțea Hospital, in the care of physician Ioan Nanu-Musceleanu, but died soon afterward in Fălticeni.

== Critical reception and legacy ==
Critics have traditionally described Dragoslav's stories as picturesque works evidencing some talent, but overall mediocre. His prose is thought to have been heavily influenced by Ion Creangă, a celebrated late 19th-century raconteur, who, like Dragoslav, borrowed inspiration from rural culture and Romanian folklore. The impact of other works on Dragoslav's work was reviewed with severity by Călinescu, who concluded that the object of his criticism was "far from being a writer." Including Dragoslav's work among an "eclectic" tendency, he rejected most of it as "garrulous" and "adulterous" versions from themes provided by other authors, and called the memoir Povestea copilăriei a "disgraceful pastiche" of Creangă's Childhood Memories. Lovinescu provides a similar verdict, noting that Dragoslav was an inauthentic peasant, who tried to adapt a "popular epic" to modern urban subjects, using the comedic work of Ion Luca Caragiale as a template. This results in "loose productions", in which the better parts are echoes from Creangă.

Dragoslav's works often employ other various narrative motifs found in earlier literature. With La han la Trei ulcele, the author illustrated the pretext of protagonists meeting in inns, a common theme in 19th- and 20th-century Romanian literature (also used by Caragiale, Nicolae N. Beldiceanu, Ioan Alexandru Brătescu-Voinești, Mihail Sadoveanu, Constantin Sandu-Aldea and Ioan Slavici). Călinescu deemed Facerea lumii, Dragoslav's main work in the fantasy genre, a "sort of glib fairy tale." The story is structured on a biblical model (the Book of Genesis), and introduced by the words: "In the beginning of beginnings there was darkness, there was no light, there was no time". As noted by Lovinescu, its mythopoeia samples residual Bogomilist beliefs, found among dwellers of the mahala (rather than being "truly peasant"), and is "evidently prolix", without "plasticity". However, the Sburătorul critic also sees such pieces as Dragoslav's "most accomplished": "aside from his ever-present naïveté, one may identify here a kind of literary styling."

Assessments of Dragoslav's literary work divided the literary circles he frequented. An especially supportive voice among literary promoters was that of Mihail Dragomirescu: he described Dragoslav as a new Creangă, and found some of his works to be masterpieces—an enthusiasm which Ornea attributes solely to the imperative need of finding new and distinctive works that would impose a dissident aesthetic guideline. Although himself affiliated with Covorbiri Critice, literary reviewer Ion Trivale commented: "What is the baggage of Dragoslav the short story writer? Sheer poverty, as far as the artistic sphere is concerned." Nevertheless, Călinescu saw one of Trivale's major mistakes as being his "excessive leniency" for both Dragoslav and comediographer Alexandru Cazaban.

Dragoslav was identified by Călinescu as the main source of inspiration for Pitarcă, a secondary character in Mihail Sorbul's novel Mângâierile panterei ("The Panther's Caresses"). His appearance is also recorded in a portrait drawn by Iosif Iser.
