= Mavrodi =

Mavrodi may refer to:

- Alexandru Mavrodi (1881–1934), Romanian theatre director and politician
- Ivan Mavrodi (1911–1981), Bulgarian-Ukrainian writer and poet
- Sergei Mavrodi (1955–2018), Russian mathematician and businessman, known for his MMM pyramid scheme
- Sergey A. Mavrody (1967), Russian and American writer, designer and film director
