= Mișu Fotino =

Romanian theatre actor (1886–1970)

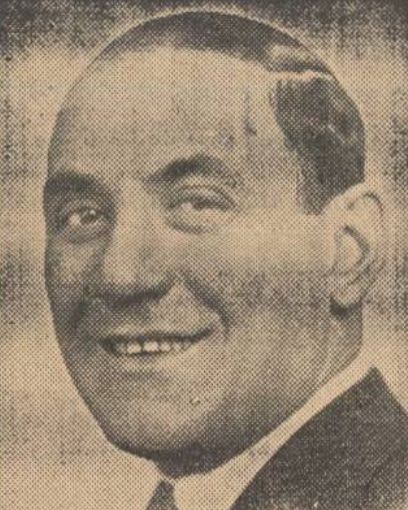

Mișu Fotino (July 24, 1886–January 4, 1970) was a Romanian stage actor and director.

Born in Bucharest, his parents were Matei Fotino, an officer, and his wife Profira, descended from the Crețulescu family. After attending primary and high school in his native city, Fotino studied at the Institute of Dramatic Art, where Constantin I. Nottara was his professor. He made his stage debut while a student, at Târgoviște as an old man in the play Telefonul, with the troupe of Eliza Popescu-Tomulescu and Cuzinschi. For seven years he was an actor at the National Theatre in Craiova. He formed his own troupe, going on a grand tour of Transylvania. He started theatres in Brașov and Sibiu. He spent time in Brăila, where he headed the Communal Theatre. Returning to Bucharest, to the Small Theatre, he played alongside Elvira Popescu, Alex. Mihalescu, and Iancovescu.

In 1930, the government named Fotino director of the Cernăuți National Theatre. That March, a celebration was held in his honor there, marking twenty years as an actor. Remaining for five years, he offered a rich repertoire of domestic and foreign plays, and was also a director. Among his signature roles were in Hagi Tudose (Barbu Ștefănescu Delavrancea), Suflete tari (Camil Petrescu), Ieremia Movilă (Nicolae Iorga), The Frock Coat (Gábor Drégely), and Păianjenul (A. de Herz). He then returned to Bucharest and continued his acting career, which had over 300 roles. According to a letter he wrote to King Carol II, Fotino was the recipient of the Order of the Crown of Romania, Officer class. After World War II, he retired to Brașov, where he died. He was buried at Bellu Cemetery, with a headstone designed by Milița Petrașcu.

His only child, Mihai Fotino, also became an actor. The elder Fotino soon separated from the child's young mother, raising him alone and guiding him onto the stage.
