= Mihai Fotino =

Romanian actor

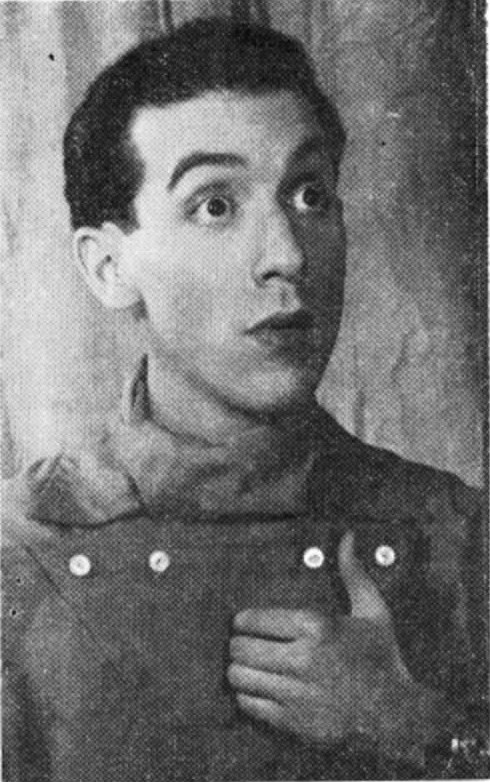
- Fotino in 1971
- Born: Mișu Matei Fotino; 14 September 1930; Bucharest, Kingdom of Romania
- Died: 13 January 2014 (aged 83); Bucharest, Romania
- Resting place: Bellu Cemetery, Bucharest
- Occupation: Actor
- Years active: 1936–2005
- Organization(s): Drama Theater Brașov; National Theatre Bucharest
- Father: Mișu Fotino
- Awards: Order of Cultural Merit (Romania)

Mihai Fotino (Romanian pronunciation: [miˈhaj fotiˈno]; 14 September 1930 – 13 January 2014) was a prolific Romanian actor who has appeared in theatre, film, television, and radio, in a career spanning 70 years.

== Biography ==
Born in Bucharest, he spent his early years in Brașov, where his father, Mișu Fotino, was a stage actor and director, and later graduated from Matei Basarab High School in Bucharest.

Fotino made his debut at the age of 6, in 1936, in the play Colonial. From 1952, he became an actor at the Drama Theater in Brașov. He was noticed by the director Sică Alexandrescu, who brought him to Bucharest. Starting in 1956, he played for over 50 years at the National Theatre Bucharest.

Fotino was awarded the Romanian Order of Cultural Merit in 1967 and 2004.

He died at Elias Hospital in Bucharest, at age 83, and was buried in the city's Bellu Cemetery.

== Filmography ==
Year	Title	Role	Notes
1937	Doamna de la etajul II		
1946	Visul unei nopți de iarnă	Gogu Panait	
1955	Directorul nostru		
1960	Telegrame	Ministrul de Interne	
1961	Porto-Franco	Nicu Politicu	
1963	Codine	Cotoiul	
1963	Politică cu... delicatese		
1965	Titanic Waltz	Dinu	
1966	Mona, l'étoile sans nom	Ticket collector	
1967	Balul de sâmbătă seara	Gigi	
1967	Amprenta	Ovidiu	
1975	Elixirul tinereții	Ionel Romanescu	
1977	Tufă de Veneția		
1987	Chirița la Iași		
2001	Sexy Harem Ada-Kaleh		(final film role)
