= Ion Marin Sadoveanu =

Romanian writer (1893 - 1964)

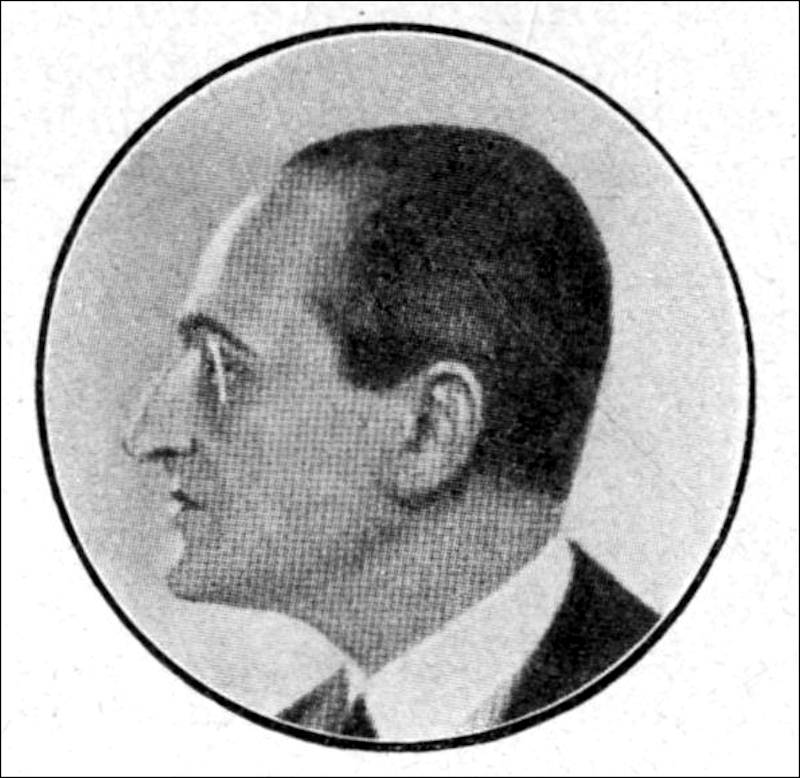
- Born: Iancu-Leonte Marinescu; June 15, 1893; Bucharest, Kingdom of Romania
- Died: February 2, 1964 (aged 70); Bucharest, Romanian People's Republic
- Resting place: Bellu Cemetery, Bucharest
- Occupation: playwright

Ion Marin Sadoveanu (born Iancu-Leonte Marinescu; June 15, 1893 – February 2, 1964) was a Romanian playwright.

== Biography ==
Born in Bucharest, he started his education at a grammar school in Constanța, where his father practiced medicine. He continued at the Mircea cel Bătrân Gymnasium, from which he graduated in 1908. He continued his education at the Saint Sava National College of Bucharest (1908–1912). He then studied philosophy in Bucharest and Paris. In 1926, he was appointed inspector of the theaters, being subsequently promoted to inspector general and in 1933 director general of the theaters and operas. Demoted in 1940, he worked as editor at the Timpul newspaper (1941–1942) and playwright of the National Theatre Bucharest until 1944. He then was editor of Universul. In 1956, he was appointed director of the National Theatre Bucharest. From 1958, he was also a member of the National Commission for UNESCO. He died in Bucharest in 1964, age 70, and was buried in the city's Bellu Cemetery.
