= Ioan Alexandru Brătescu-Voinești =

Romanian writer and politician

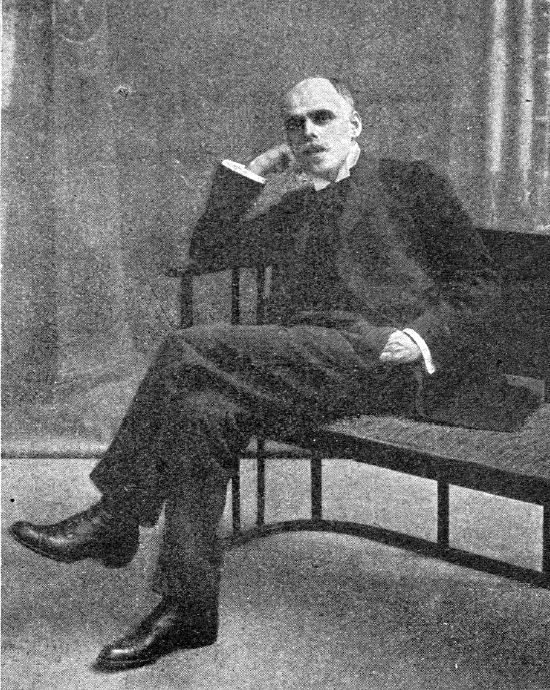
- Brătescu-Voinești în 1912
- Born: January 1, 1868; Târgoviște, United Principalities
- Died: December 14, 1946 (aged 78); Bucharest, Kingdom of Romania
- Resting place: Bellu Cemetery, Bucharest
- Education: Saint Sava High School; University of Bucharest
- Occupations: Short story writer and politician
- Spouse: Penelope Popescu
- Children: 2
- Writing career
- Genre: Short story
- Notable work: Nuvele și schițe
- Movement: Junimea

Ioan Alexandru Brătescu-Voinești (January 1, 1868 – December 14, 1946) was a Romanian short story writer and politician. The scion of a minor aristocratic family from Târgoviște, he studied law and, as a young man, drew close to the Junimea circle and its patron Titu Maiorescu. He began publishing fiction as an adolescent, and put out his first book of stories in 1903; his work centered on the fading provincial milieu dominated by old class structures. Meanwhile, after a break with Maiorescu, he drew toward Viața Românească and Garabet Ibrăileanu. In 1907, Brătescu-Voinești entered the Romanian parliament, where he would serve for over three decades while his written output declined. In his later years, he became an outspoken anti-Semite and fascist, a stance that, following his country's defeat in World War II, gave way to anti-communism near the end of his life.

== Biography ==
=== Literary work ===
Born in Târgoviște, his parents were Alexandru Brătescu, a low-ranking boyar and the son of a pitar (bread supplier), and Alexandrina, daughter of Ion Voinescu, a major in the Wallachian Revolution of 1848. He was the second of four children. His childhood took place amidst the traditional environment of old Târgoviște and at the Brătești estate. He attended primary school in his native town from 1875 to 1879, then at the Cocorăscu boarding school and finally at Saint Sava High School in Bucharest from 1879 to 1883. One theory, unsupported by documentary evidence, is that his literary debut occurred with a poem in Târgoviște's Armonia magazine in 1883; a likelier scenario is that it took place in România magazine in 1887, when he published the short story "Dolores" with the help of Alexandru Vlahuță. He attended the medical faculty of the University of Bucharest from 1889 to 1890, but switched to law. At the same time, he audited the logic and history of philosophy course taught by Titu Maiorescu, entered Bucharest's Junimea circle, and in 1890 began contributing to its Convorbiri Literare. His father died in 1890, and Maiorescu took on the role of father figure in the young man's life. After graduating in 1892, he was appointed a judge through his mentor's intervention, serving at Bucharest, Pitești, Craiova, and Târgoviște. Living in his native town for nearly two decades after arriving there in 1896, he practiced as a lawyer after leaving the bench. Brătescu-Voinești found life there rather constraining: he had to sell the Brătești property at a loss, and lived on the irregular income earned from lawyer's fees. He lacked a literary discussion circle, largely editing his own work, and would eventually enter politics out of boredom. He married Brăila native Penelope Popescu, who was beautiful but poor; the couple had two children. His choice of wife perturbed Maiorescu, who surmised the union would reduce the social standing of Brătescu-Voinești, and in 1896 invited him on a trip to Great Britain (the two had already journeyed to Switzerland and twice to Italy, on Maiorescu's money). While abroad, the younger man engaged in bizarre behavior; upon his return home, the critic asked his brother whether he had not lost his mind. He also steadfastly refused to marry the niece of Maiorescu's wife. The cumulative effect of these transgressions was to prompt the mentor to cut off ties that were never renewed, in spite of the younger man's attempts to restore relations. A postscript took place in 1903, when Brătescu-Voinești submitted the short story "Neamul Udreștilor" (later published in Voința națională) for Maiorescu's review. Although some critics have speculated that the changes suggested by the latter caused their break, the writer in fact accepted nearly all of them. In either case, after that date, he split with Junimea and became affiliated with the Viața Românească group. Alongside Mihail Sadoveanu, he was one of the magazine's most valued contributors, and entered the public eye thanks to his appearance in its pages. Moreover, its patron Garabet Ibrăileanu somewhat filled in the gap left by the break with Maiorescu.

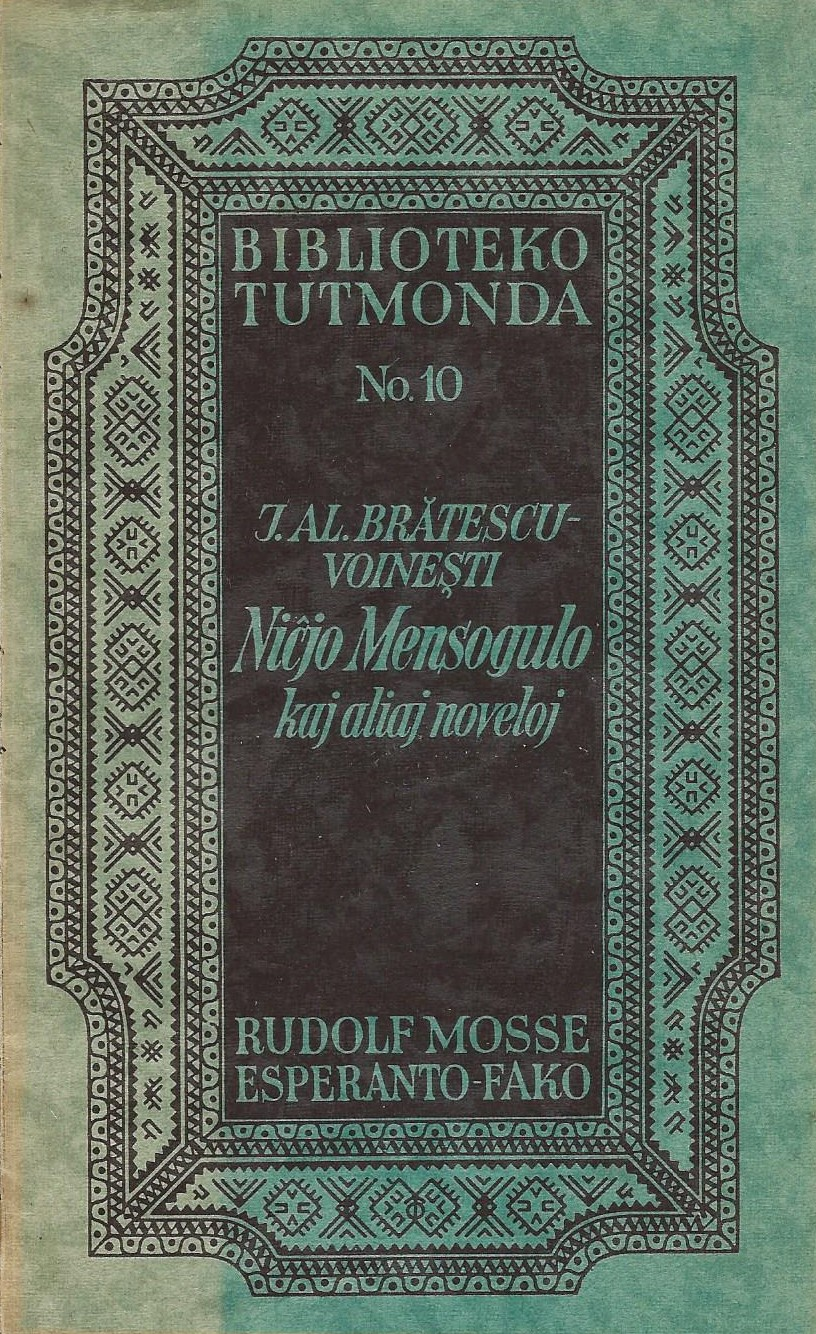
Cover of Brătescu-Voinești's sketches and novellas in the Esperanto edition of 1927

His first book was the 1903 Nuvele și schițe, enlarged and re-edited as În lumea dreptății (1906), followed by Întuneric și lumină (1912), after which his fiction gave way to opinion journalism, collected as În slujba păcei (1919). In 1912, he served as interim director of the National Theatre Bucharest. In 1913, he served as a platoon commander in the Second Balkan War; he was amused by the respect his troops showed due to his white hair, but also became a vehement pacifist thanks to the experience. This caused a break with Viața Românească, which he believed was leading public opinion in the wrong direction. He was credited with co-writing the 1915 play Sorana alongside A. de Herz, but later claimed the latter had not contributed a single line. He reissued the play in 1920 without Herz' name on the cover, prompting the latter to sue and win the case. From 1918 to 1919, he worked on Dacia and Lamura, magazines he headed together with Vlahuță and, following the latter's death, alone from 1919 to 1922. His task at Dacia, communicated from government sources, was to discredit those who had collaborated with the country's German occupiers during World War I (of which Herz was emblematic). Brătescu-Voinești and his chief declined to do so, but nevertheless received warnings from potential targets such as Tudor Arghezi.

Brătescu-Voinești evoked the medium of the crumbling ancient boyar class and its uncomplicated structure, of small-time provincial clerks; his characters are unable to adapt to the modern world, their souls filled with candor, hurt when they come into contact with the brutal bourgeois world, incapable of withstanding the impact of lies and injustice. Although romantic, his material is handled using a classic, direct, simple, often confessional tone. His sympathetic participation in the destinies he narrates gives his prose an intensely lyrical flavor, which helps account for its charm and popularity.

=== Move toward politics ===
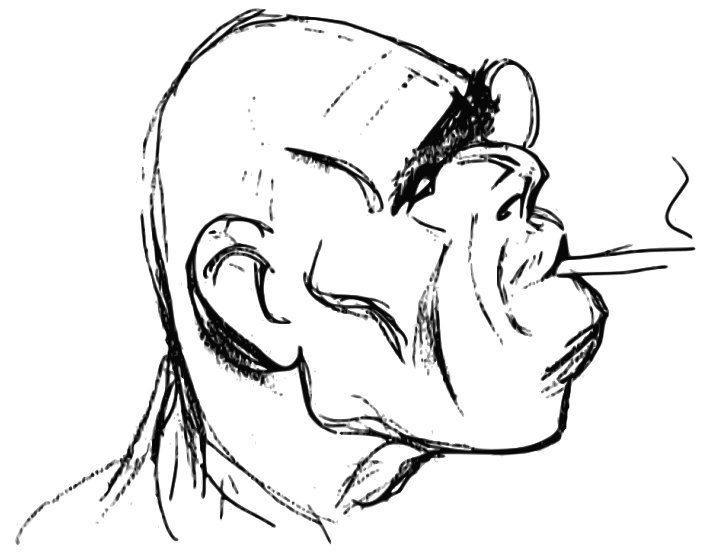
Caricature of Brătescu-Voinești by Victor Ion Popa (1934)

After entering political life, he was a member of parliament continuously from 1907 until 1940, and served as secretary of the Assembly of Deputies from 1914 to 1940. He was a member of the National Liberal Party from 1907 to 1914. Elected a corresponding member of the Romanian Academy in 1908, he advanced to titular member in 1918. Between 1920 and 1940, he published only sporadically: Rătăcire (1923), Firimituri (1929), Cu undița (1933) and Din pragul apusului (1935). Between 1920 and 1932, he wrote school textbooks in collaboration with other authors.

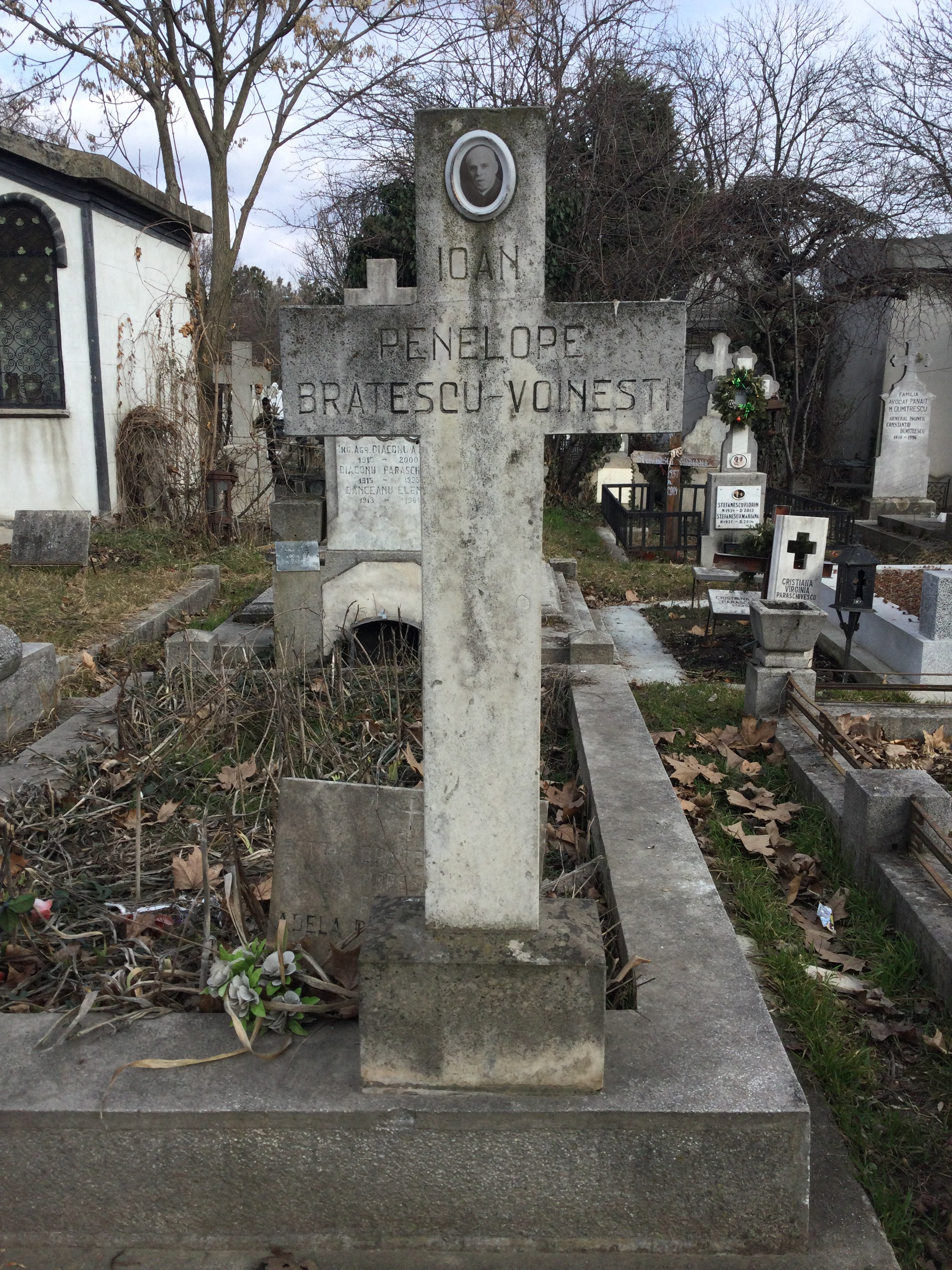
Grave at Bellu Cemetery

Starting in 1937, he veered toward fascism, setting forth his theories in programmatic pamphlets: Huliganism? (1938), Strigăte de alarmă în chestia evreiască (1940) and Germanofobie? (1942). His transition was somewhat surprising: other than his pacifist essays of 1919, Brătescu-Voinești had heretofore not made waves within his conservative circles. But beginning with an anti-Semitic press campaign of 1937, he passed through all the stages of Romanian anti-Semitism, from "popular" and traditional form to the politically and ideologically radical variant. A declared follower of Mihail Eminescu's nationalism and an unreserved admirer of A. C. Cuza, he proudly called himself a "hooligan", praised Hitlerism and stood beside Ion Antonescu during World War II, backing racial laws and deportation of the Jews. Brătescu-Voinești was friends with Antonescu, who in March 1943 granted him an interview in which he thanked Germany for supporting his efforts to rid the country of parasites and internal enemies, and pledged to continue the fight until Jewish Bolshevism was eradicated.

In his 1942 Originea neamului românesc și a limbii noastre, he built on discredited pre-World War I theories of Nicolae Densușianu to claim that all Romance languages were of Dacian origin, that the Romans were descended from Geto-Dacians, with Latin a literary form of Dacian, and that Italian, French, and Spanish had "Romanian" roots. Near the end of his life, he engaged in a polemic against the rising Romanian Communist Party: eschewing the invective and incitement of other Romanian fascists, he adopted a feeble biologism, claiming that Marxist doctrine is contradicted by the example of wasps, bees, ants and termites. Concurrently, Scînteia and other newspapers affiliated with the party hurled copious epithets at the aging figure, denouncing his wartime collaborationism and printed output.
