= Ivan Mavrodi =

Ukrainian writer (1911–1981)

Ivan Vasylovych Mavrodi (Bulgarian: Иван Василев Мавроди, Ukrainian: Іван Васильович Мавроді, Russian: Иван Мавроди; 5 August 1911, Katarzhino – 1981, Odesa) was a Bulgarian-Ukrainian Soviet writer and poet.

Ivan Mavrodi was born in the largely Bulgarian village of Katarzhino (Катаржино), now Znamianka (Знам'янка), Odesa Oblast, Ukraine, to a family of Bulgarian resettlers to the Russian Empire. In 1935 he graduated from Odesa Pedagogical Institute and worked as teacher in rural schools. During the Great Patriotic War he joined the active service in the Soviet Army.

His first publications are dated by 1932.

== Works ==
=== Books ===
In Bulgarian language, by the National Minorities Publishing House, Kharkiv, Ukraine:

- 1932: «Партизани. И други разкази»
- 1934: «На пълен ход»
- 1941: «Дочо Цигуларов»

In Russian language:

- 1955: «Радость»
- 1956: «Первые всходы»
- 1961: «У нас на юге»
- 1977: «Буджакские повести»

=== Poetry ===
He wrote poems in the Bulgarian language throughout his whole life, but was unable to find a publisher in the Ukrainian SSR. In 1972 the Moldavian Soviet publisher Cartea Moldovenească, Chişinău, printed his collection of poems «За тебе аз мисля» (I am Thinking about You).
