= George Talaz =

- Born: October 18, 1898
- Died: March 2, 1973 (aged 74)
- Other name: Gheorghe Antonescu
- Occupation: Poet

George Talaz (pen name of Gheorghe Antonescu; October 18, 1898–March 2, 1973) was a Romanian poet.

Born in Toporăști, Vaslui County, he attended the Academy of Painting and Sculpture, but did not graduate. His published debut took place in 1916, and involved poems. His work appeared in Azi, Falanga, Flacăra, Gândirea and Ritmul vremii. He edited Vestea satelor and Scânteia satelor. His poetry volumes, which spanned half a century (Fântână, 1937; De vorbă cu fierul de plug, 1949; Armonii în zori, 1961; Treptele împlinirii, 1967; Poezie, 1968), clearly illustrate how style and literary demands evolved during the period. The most enduring part of his output is the early work, the symbolist poetry of the first books. He died in Bucharest.
