= Alexandru Davila =

Romanian dramatist, diplomat, public administrator and memoirist (1862 - 1929)

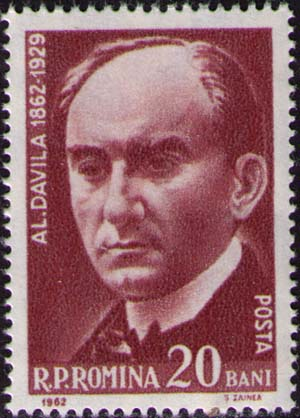
- Davila on a 1962 stamp of Romania
- Born: February 12, 1862; Golești, Argeș County, Romanian United Principalities
- Died: October 19, 1929 (aged 67); Bucharest, Kingdom of Romania
- Occupations: Dramatist, diplomat, public administrator, memoirist
- Writing career
- Notable works: Vlaicu Vodă, Din torsul zilelor

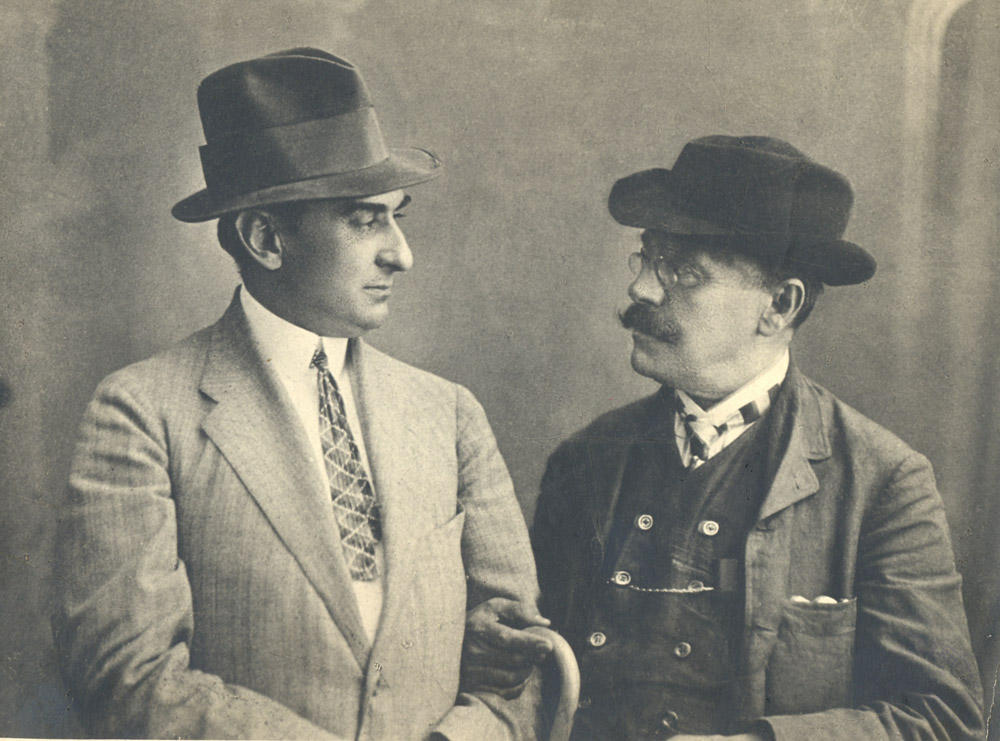
Alexandru Davila and Ion Luca Caragiale, 1909

Alexandru Davila (Romanian pronunciation: [alekˈsandru daviˈla]; February 12, 1862 – October 19, 1929) was a Romanian dramatist, diplomat, public administrator, and memoirist.

== Biography ==
The son of Carol Davila, a distinguished military physician of French origin, and Ana Racoviță, a descendant of the Racoviță and Golescu boyars, he studied in his native Golești and at V. A. Urechia's college in Bucharest, earning his bachelor's degree in Paris.

In the early 1880s, Davila was an attaché for the Romanian legations in Italy and, in 1884, Belgium. Later in the same year, upon his father's death, he returned to his country to serve as police inspector and then as head of the administration in a province of Northern Dobruja.

He took up writing and theater management in the closing years of the 19th century. In 1902, he completed his major work, a drama entitled Vlaicu Vodă (based on the life of a 14th-century Wallachian Prince), one of the first important pieces of its kind in Romanian literature. Between 1905 and 1908, he was the head of the National Theatre Bucharest.

In 1915, a mysterious attempt to have him killed resulted in paralysis — Davila was bedridden for the rest of his life, as a sanatorium patient. He died in 1929 at the Central Military Hospital in Bucharest. An intimate friend of the royal family under Carol I, he left behind his Din torsul zilelor, a memoir of life at the turn of the century. Alongside his portrait of Carol, the book is remembered for those of figures such as Take Ionescu, Alexandru Dimitrie Xenopol, and Vasile Morțun.
