= National Theatre Bucharest =

Theatre in Bucharest, Romania

Coordinates: 44°26′11.92″N 26°6′12.85″E

Ion Luca Caragiale National Theatre
- Teatrul Național "Ion Luca Caragiale"
- The National Theatre in April 2017
- Interactive map of Ion Luca Caragiale National Theatre
- Address: 2 Nicolae Bălcescu Boulevard, sector 1 Bucharest; Romania
- Owner: Ministry of Culture of Romania
- Capacity: 2,613 (in seven auditoriums)

Construction
- Opened: 20 December 1973
- Rebuilt: 2012–2014
- Years active: 1973–present
- Architects: Horia Maicu, Romeo Belea, Nicolae Cucu (initial project); Cezar Lăzărescu (1983 modification); Romeo Belea (2014 remodeling)

Website
- www.tnb.ro/en

The National Theatre Bucharest (Romanian: Teatrul Naţional "Ion Luca Caragiale" București) is one of the national theatres of Romania, located in the capital city of Bucharest.

== Founding ==
It was founded as the Teatrul cel Mare din București ("Grand Theatre of Bucharest") in 1852, its first director being Costache Caragiale. It became a national institution in 1864 by a decree of Prime Minister Mihail Kogălniceanu, and was officially named as the National Theatre in 1875; it is now administered by the Romanian Ministry of Culture.

In April 1836, the Societatea Filarmonica — a cultural society founded by Ion Heliade Rădulescu and Ion Câmpineanu — bought the Câmpinencii Inn to build a National Theatre on the site, and began to collect money and materials for this purpose. In 1840, Obşteasca Adunare (the legislative branch established under the terms of the Imperial Russian-approved Organic Statute) proposed to Alexandru II Ghica, the Prince of Wallachia, a project to build a National Theatre with state support. The request was approved on June 4, 1840. Prince Gheorghe Bibescu adopted the idea of founding the theatre and chose a new location, on the spot of the former Filaret Inn. There were several reasons to favor this location: it was centrally located, right in the middle of Podul Mogoşoaiei (today's Calea Victoriei); the earthquake of 1838 had damaged the inn beyond repair, and it needed to be torn down.

== Old building ==
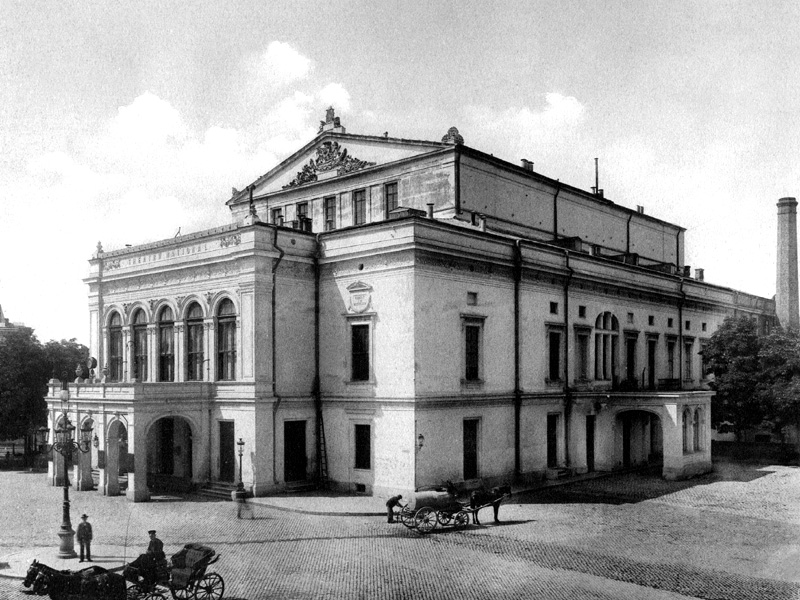
The old building of the National Theatre in 1901–1904

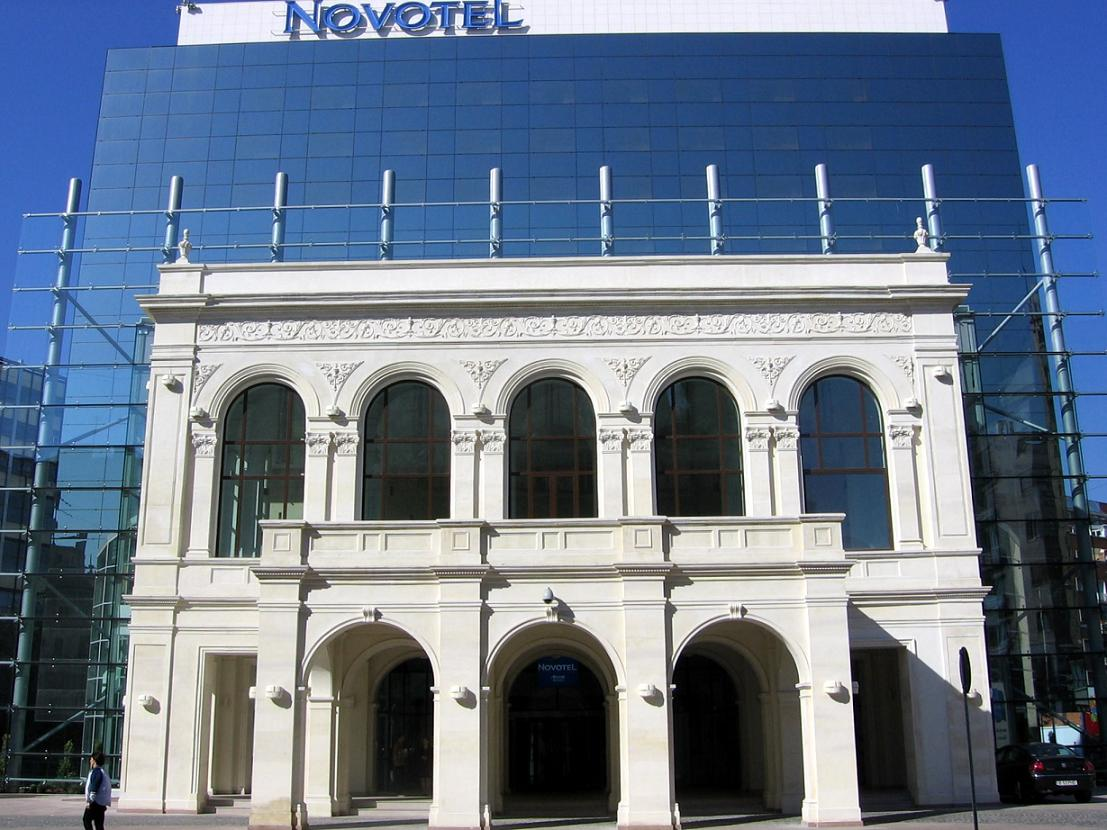
The front of the Bucharest Novotel, on Calea Victoriei in 2010, replicates the exterior of the old Romanian National Theatre approximately in its original location

The August 13, 1843, report of the commission charged with building the theatre determined that construction would cost 20,300 florins (standard gold coin) of which only 13,000 gold coins were available. In 1846, a new commission engaged the Viennese architect A. Hefft, who came up with an acceptable plan.

Construction got under way in 1848, only to be interrupted in June by the Wallachian revolution. In August 1849, after Prince Barbu Dimitrie Ştirbei took power, he ordered that construction be completed.

The theatre was inaugurated on December 31, 1852, with the play Zoe sau Amantul împrumutat, described in the newspapers of the time as a "vaudeville with songs". The building was built in the baroque style, with 338 stalls on the main floor, three levels of loges, a luxurious foyer with staircases of Carrara marble and a large gallery in which students could attend free of charge. For its first two years, the theatre was lit with tallow lamps, but from 1854 it used rape oil lamps; still later this was replaced by gaslights and eventually electric lights. In 1875, at the time its name was changed to Teatrul Naţional, its director was the writer Alexandru Odobescu.

The historic theatre building on Calea Victoriei — now featured on the 100-leu banknote — was destroyed during the Luftwaffe bombardment of Bucharest on August 24, 1944 (see Bombing of Bucharest in World War II).

== The modern theatre ==
Bucharest National Theatre in its form from 1983 to 2012

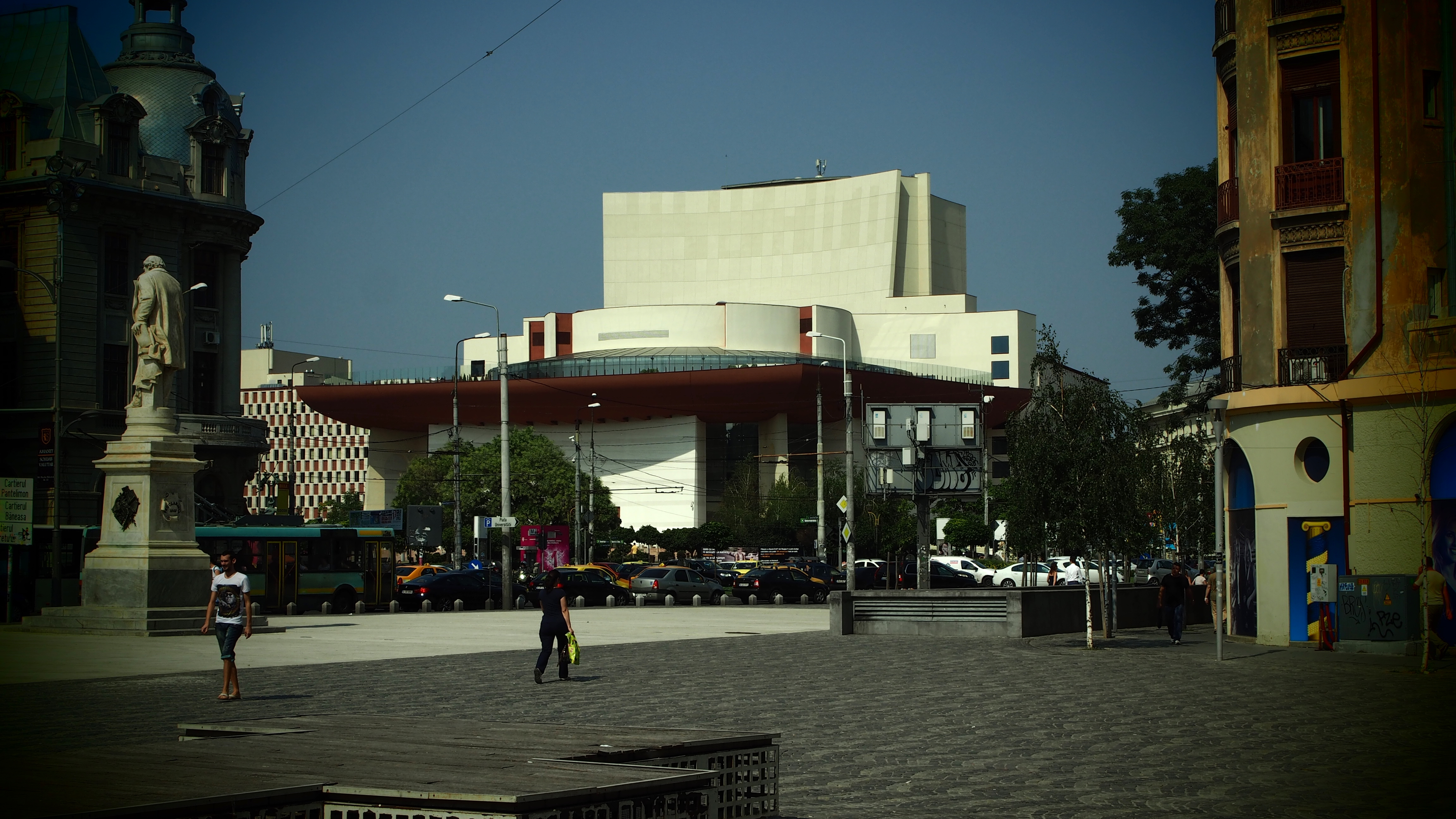
The building after the last renovation

The current National Theatre is located about half a kilometre away from the old site, just south of the Hotel Intercontinental at Piaţa Universităţii (University Square), and has been in use since 1973. The edifice was extensively renovated from 2012 to 2014.

== Theatre activity ==
Currently, the Bucharest National Theatre presents its performances in seven auditoriums: Ion Caramitru Hall (940 seats), Small Hall (130-150 seats), Studio Hall (424-594 seats), Black Box Hall (200 seats), Painting Hall (230 seats), Media Hall (200 seats), and Amphitheatre (outdoor terrace) (299 seats).

In over 150 years of existence, the Bucharest National Theatre presented on stage many of the most significant pieces of universal dramaturgy. It has had successful performances both in and outside the country: France, Germany, Austria, Yugoslavia, Italy, England, Spain, Portugal, Greece, Brazil, etc.

== Chairmen ==
1. Costache Caragiale, Ioan A.Wachmann: 1852–1853, Costache Caragiale: 1853–1855
2. Matei Millo: 1855–1859, 1861–1866, 1870–1871
3. C. A. Rosetti: 1859–1860
4. Direcția Comitetului Teatrelor: 1860–1861
5. Costache Dimitriade: 1866–1867
6. Matei Millo, Mihail Pascaly: 1867–1868
7. Grigore Bengescu: 1868–1870
8. Mihail Pascaly: 1871–1874, 1876–1877
9. Societatea Dramatică: 1874–1875
10. Al. Odobescu: 1875–1876
11. Ion Ghica: 1877–1881
12. Constantin Cornescu: 1881–1882
13. Grigore C. Cantacuzino: 1882–1887, 1889–1898
14. Constantin Stăncescu: 1887–1888
15. Ion Luca Caragiale: 1888–1889
16. Grigore C. Cantacuzino, Petre Grădişteanu: 1898–1899
17. Scarlat Ghica: 1899–1901
18. Ştefan Sihleanu: 1901–1905
19. Alexandru Davila: 1905–1908
20. Pompiliu Eliade: 1908–1911
21. Ion Bacalbașa: 1911–1912
22. A. Davila, I.A. Brătescu–Voinești, George Diamandi: 1912–1914
23. George Diamandi: 1914–1915
24. Alexandru Mavrodi: 1915–1916, 1922–1923, 1931–1933
25. German occupation: 1917–1918
26. Constantin Rădulescu-Motru, I. Peretz: 1918–1919
27. Ion Peretz, Victor Eftimiu: 1919–1920
28. Victor Eftimiu: 1920–1921
29. Victor Eftimiu, Al. Mavrodi: 1921–1922
30. Ion Valjan: 1923–1924
31. Corneliu Moldovanu, Ion Minulescu: 1924–1925
32. Corneliu Moldovanu, Al. Hodos: 1925–1927
33. Corneliu Moldovanu: 1927–1928
34. Corneliu Moldovanu, Liviu Rebreanu: 1928–1929
35. Liviu Rebreanu, Victor Eftimiu: 1929–1930
36. Ion Grigore Perieţeanu, Al. Mavrodi: 1930–1931
37. Al. Mavrodi, Paul Prodan: 1933–1934
38. Paul Prodan: 1934–1937
39. Paul Prodan, Ion Marin Sadoveanu: 1937–1938
40. Ion Marin Sadoveanu, Camil Petrescu: 1938–1939
41. Camil Petrescu, Ion Marin Sadoveanu: 1939–1940
42. Ion Marin Sadoveanu, Haig Acterian, Liviu Rebreanu: 1940–1941
43. Liviu Rebreanu: 1941–1944
44. Victor Eftimiu, Nicolae Carandino, Tudor Vianu: 1944–1945
45. Ion Pas: 1945–1946
46. Ion Pas, Zaharia Stancu: 1946–1947
47. Zaharia Stancu: 1947–1952
48. Ioan Popa: 1952–1953
49. Vasile Moldoveanu: 1953–1956
50. Ion Marin Sadoveanu: 1956–1959
51. Zaharia Stancu: 1959–1969
52. Radu Beligan: 1969–1990
53. Andrei Şerban: 1990–1993
54. Fănuș Neagu: 1993–1996
55. Ion Cojar: 1996–2001
56. Dinu Săraru: 2001–2004
57. Ion Caramitru: 2005–2021

In 2005, following a contest, the actor Ion Caramitru was appointed as general director of the theatre.

== See also ==
- List of concert halls
