= Alexandru Mavrodi =

Romanian journalist, theater figure and politician

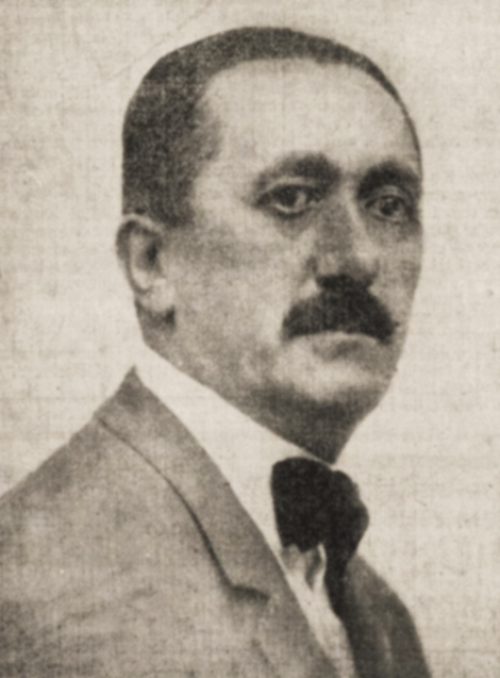
Mavrodi c. 1934

Alexandru P. Mavrodi (December 7, 1881 – September 24, 1934) was a Romanian journalist, theater figure and politician.

Born in Dorohoi, he studied dramatic arts at the Iași Conservatory. He then earned two doctorates, in Law from Paris and in Philosophy from Bonn. He entered journalism in 1898, writing for several Iași newspapers: Opinia, Evenimentul, Ordinea and Gazeta Moldovei, where he became editor. In 1903, he became a “second-rate” actor at the Iași National Theatre. Initially unpaid, his roles were minor but demanded stage presence; the young actor was tall, spoke clearly and looked well in formal costume. Likely due to the insignificance of his roles, Mavrodi emerged as a malcontent, ready to defend perceived victims of injustice, particularly actresses “insulted” by directors. He would respond to personal slights by recruiting seconds and asking for a duel. After leaving Iași, he went to Paris, where he studied journalism for two years on a scholarship.

Returning to Romania and moving to Bucharest, he briefly worked as a political reporter at Adevărul and Dimineața. He was chief editor and later manager of the official National Liberal journal Viitorul. There, he wrote about politics and reviewed plays under the pen name Alexandru Fronda (a character in Haralamb Lecca’s play Câinii). While at Viitorul, he became embroiled in a scandal regarding the re-election of Duiliu Zamfirescu as President of the Chamber of Deputies. The newspaper’s constant attacks on Zamfirescu prompted him to challenge Mavrodi to a duel, sending seconds to the editor’s office. Mavrodi also chose seconds, but they were unable to agree to terms.

In 1915, he became director of the National Theater Bucharest and general director of theaters. He was brought in to save an institution in chaos and on the verge of bankruptcy; unlike his predecessors, he was an insider. He held this position until 1918, again in 1922-1923 and finally from 1931. He was head of the Radio Society and of the journalists’ union.

A key member of King Carol II’s camarilla, he was treasured by the king and Elena Lupescu for the information he provided regarding senior Liberal figures. He sat as a Liberal in the Chamber of Deputies (1931) and in the Senate. He was deputy state secretary in the prime minister’s office from November 1933 until his death.
