= D. Nanu =

Romanian poet and translator

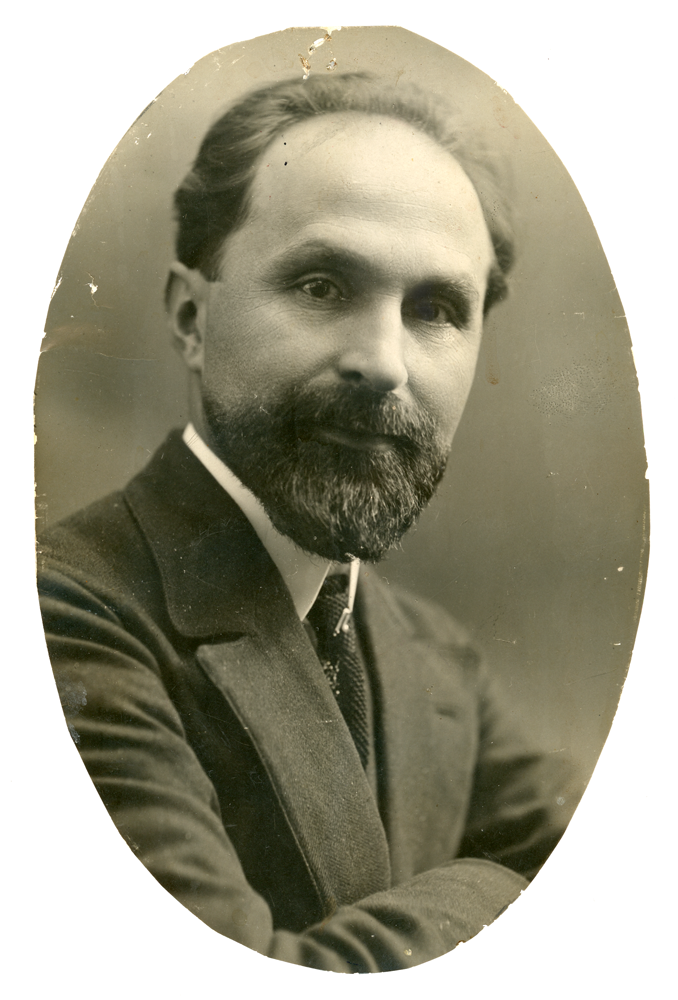
- Nanu in 1925
- Born: Dumitru G. Nanu; October 26, 1873; Câmpulung, Romania
- Died: February 12, 1943 (aged 69); Câmpulung, Kingdom of Romania
- Education: University of Agronomic Sciences and Veterinary Medicine
- Occupations: Poet, translator
- Writing career
- Notable awards: Poetry prize of the Romanian Writers' Society (1932); National poetry prize (1937)

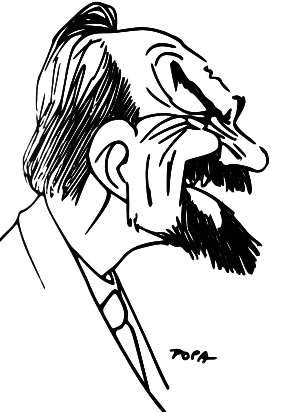
Nanu's caricature, by Victor Ion Popa (c. 1920)

Dumitru G. Nanu (October 26, 1873 – February 12, 1943) was a Romanian poet and translator.

Born in Câmpulung to Gheorghe Nanu and his wife Zoia (née Hristodos), he attended primary school in his native town, followed by Matei Basarab and Saint Sava high schools in Bucharest. He then graduated from the Veterinary School. He was a high school French teacher in Bacău and Bârlad, as well as a librarian. He made his literary debut in 1891 in Lumea ilustrată; his first published volume, Nocturne, appeared in 1900. He was a frequent contributor to the literary magazines of his day. At Bârlad, from January to December 1900, he published the Sămănătorist magazine Paloda literară. In 1932 he was awarded the poetry prize of the Romanian Writers' Society. He also won the national prize for poetry in 1937; awarded on the recommendation of Nicolae Iorga, this prize came with 100,000 lei.

More than his verses, his contemporaries appreciated his discreet, modest and dignified personality. He was a traditionalist poet, strongly influenced by Mihai Eminescu (as can be seen both in his debut volume and in the 1934 Poezii). Nanu particularly focused on lyric poems characterized by religious and philosophical meditation. Alone or in collaboration, he translated works by William Shakespeare, Pierre Corneille, Jean Racine, Guy de Maupassant, Paul Bourget and Alfred de Musset.

Nanu died in 1943 in Câmpulung, in the arms of his nephew, the poet Mihai Moșandrei.
