= Corneliu Moldovanu =

Romanian poet, prose writer and playwright

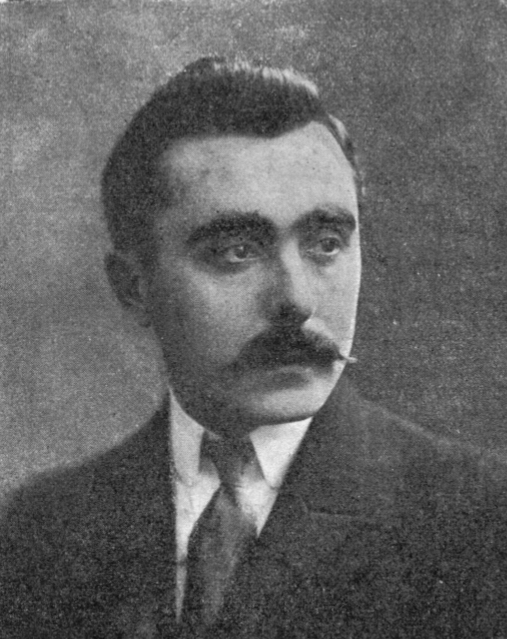
Moldovanu in 1912

Corneliu Moldovanu (pen name of Corneliu Vasiliu; 15 August 1883 – 2 September 1952) was a Romanian poet, prose writer and playwright.

Born in Bârlad, his parents were Dumitrache Vasiliu, a merchant, and his wife Ruxandra (née Rășcanu). After attending primary school in his native town, he entered the Boarding High School in Iași, graduating in 1902. He then earned a degree from the University of Bucharest's literature and philosophy faculty, in 1904. Starting that year, he was a secretary at the Conservatory of Music and Dramatic Arts, rising to associate professor in 1911. In 1917 at Iași, Romania's temporary World War I capital, he published Românul newspaper, together with Mihail Sadoveanu, Octavian Goga, Mihail Sorbul, Barbu Ștefănescu Delavrancea and Ion Minulescu. He was a founding member of the Romanian Writers' Society established in 1909, and served as its president from 1921 to 1923 and from 1933 to 1935. He chaired the National Theatre Bucharest and was general director of theatres from 1924 to 1926 and from 1927 to 1928.

Moldovanu made his literary debut in 1899 in Epoca literară and Floare albastră. Publications that ran his work include Epoca literară, Evenimentul literar, Revista modernă, Artă și literatură română, Noua revistă română, Convorbiri critice, Rampa, Flacăra, Universul, Sămănătorul and Luceafărul. His first book was the 1907 poetry collection Flăcări, followed by Cetatea Soarelui și alte poeme (1910) and Poezii (1924), as well as the short prose books Neguțătorul de arome (1916) and Povestiri (1921). He wrote the two-volume 1922 novel Purgatoriul, and translated works by Guy de Maupassant and Pierre Corneille. In outlook, he was a Sămănătorist. He was awarded the Legion of Honour in 1927 and the national prize for poetry in 1933.
