= Cincinat Pavelescu =

Romanian poet and playwright

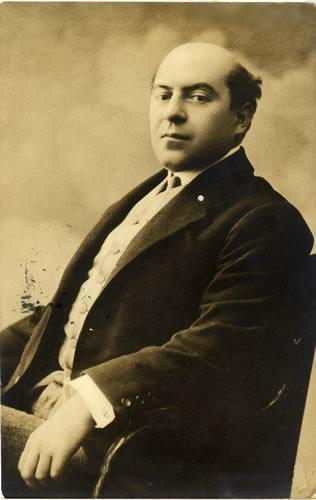
Cincinat Pavelescu

Cincinat Pavelescu (November 2 [O.S. October 20] 1872 – November 30, 1934) was a Romanian poet and playwright.

== Biography ==
Born in Bucharest, his parents were the engineer Ion Pavelescu and his wife Paulina (née Bucșan). He attended the Cantemir High School in his native city, followed by the law faculty of the University of Bucharest from 1891 to 1895, and received his doctorate in 1897.

He began a legal career in 1899. Meanwhile, he had made his literary debut with poems in Biblioteca familiei, in 1891. He began to attract notice with his writings in Literatorul, where he began publishing in 1892. That year, he became its editor-in-chief, and took on the role of co-director in 1893. He was editor-in-chief of Convorbiri critice (1907-1908), and formed part of the leadership at Falanga literară from 1910. In 1920, he edited Le courier franco-roumain, politique, économique et littéraire at Paris. From 1931 to 1934, he directed Brașovul literar magazine. He was the first president of the Romanian Writers' Society, elected in 1908.

In 1927, he won the national prize for poetry. He died in Brașov.

== Bibliography ==
- Despre agenții diplomatici (doctoral thesis), Bucharest, 1897
- Poezii, Bucharest, 1911
- Epigrame, Craiova, 1925 (subsequent edition, 1934)
- Poezii, Bucharest, 1926
- Epigrame, Bucharest, 1966
- Versuri. Epigrame. Amintiri. Corespondență, Bucharest, 1972
