= Avram Steuerman-Rodion =

Romanian writer

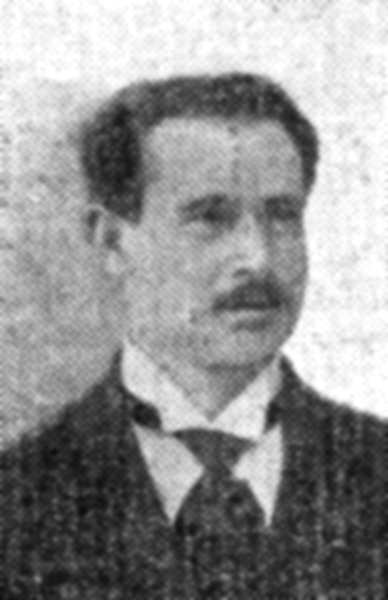
- Born: November 30, 1872; Iași
- Died: September 19, 1918 (aged 45); Iași
- Occupations: poet, journalist, translator, physician, political activist
- Writing career
- Pen name: A. de la Iași, As., Aster, De la Iași, Leander, Rodion, A. Trestianu, Tristis
- Period: ca. 1890-1918
- Genres: essay, lyric poetry, memoir, quatrain, short story, sonnet
- Literary movement: Contemporanul

Avram Steuerman-Rodion, born Adolf Steuerman or Steuermann and often referred to as just Rodion (November 30, 1872 – September 19, 1918), was a Romanian poet, anthologist, physician and socialist journalist. A member of Romania's Jewish community, he was a lifelong militant for Jewish emancipation and assimilation, noted for poems which attack the prevailing antisemitism of his day. For a while, he was active as a propagandist of Hovevei Zion ideas among local Jews.

During the early stages World War I, Rodion was a columnist at Seara daily, with articles which criticized Romania's prospects of joining the Entente Powers. Steuerman is himself described as a Germanophile, but, upon Romania's entry into the war in 1916, earned distinction on the local front. He committed suicide upon demobilization, following episodes of clinical depression.

Married into the family of Jewish intellectuals Moses and Elias Schwartzfeld, Steuerman-Rodion was thus related to poet-philosopher Benjamin Fondane, who was his literary pupil. Steuerman himself is often described as an obscure contributor to Romanian literature, but survives in cultural memory for having given a poetic voice to the ideals of Jewish integration.

== Biography ==
=== Early life and career ===
A native of Iași city, the historical capital of Moldavia region, Steuerman was a graduate of the National High School. He published his first poem in Drapelul, a Moldavian weekly, and debuted as a polemicist in the satirical journal Perdaful. A passionate writer and, according to his friend Blumenfeld-Scrutator, "the prototype of journalistic refinement", he moved on to establish his own newspaper. Addressed to the Moldavian Jews, it was called Răsăritul ("The East"), and stood for Zionism. Steuerman also contributed to the Iași gazette Jurnalul, an organ of a left-wing political movement spearheaded by George Panu. Known under the pen name As., he was a noted proponent of socialist literature and didacticism in art, following the theories of socialist thinker Constantin Dobrogeanu-Gherea.

As a result, Steuerman had his works published in the Moldavian socialist review, Contemporanul. He fought to defend Dobrogeanu-Gherea against dissident socialists, in particular against a pseudonymous critic, I. Saint Pierre. In November 1894, he and Anton Bacalbașa of Adevărul daily were each proposing ways to uncover Saint Pierre's real identity, and debating each other on the actual nature of Pierre's critique. By then, Steuerman's own articles were being taken up by Adevărul. As a correspondent, he was using a regional pen name: De la Iași, later A. de la Iași.

By 1893, Steuerman had enlisted at the University of Iași Faculty of Medicine, but was still preoccupied with literary studies. The Jewish printing house of Lazăr Șaraga hosted Steuerman's selection of Romanian literature, Autori români ("Romanian Authors"). Published in or around 1893, it was divided into two volumes: the Anthology-proper and the Chrestomathy. Steuerman and Șaraga published a second edition in 1896. Between these, Steuerman and his editor worked on translations from the work of philosopher Vasile Conta, putting out the Theory of Universal Undulation in 1894, and the Basic Metaphysics in 1896. The same collaboration brought the posthumous edition of poems by the socialist Traian Demetrescu, published by Șaraga and prefaced by Steuerman, and tales by Carmen Sylva, the Queen-consort of Romania.

In Moldavia, Steuerman made his name writing for the moderate left-wing paper Evenimentul. Additionally, he worked with the Evenimenul men Al. Stroja-Flișki and Ioan Dafin on the literary magazine Cărticica Săptămânei. Writing years later, Dafin called Rodion "one of [Romania's] most talented journalists". According to Dafin, he wrote with "amazing ease", and was involved on all aspects of creative work.

In parallel, Steuerman was studying to become a Doctor of Medicine: beginning in autumn 1896, he furthered his medical studies in France. Normally, this departure would have brought a hiatus in his journalistic activity. Steuerman compensated by mailing daily contributions to Evenimentul, and, as Dafin notes, "his absence from Iași was not at all felt by his readers." Upon his return, he set up a medical practice in the city. His thesis, on the treatment of skin cancer, was eventually printed in 1898.

His writing career was consecrated by several volumes of lyrical poetry—Sărăcie ("Poverty"), Lirice ("Lyricals"), Spini ("Thorns")—, a volume of short stories—O toamnă la Paris ("An Autumn in Paris")—, a libretto for an opera about Moldavian Prince Petru Rareș, and several translations. The latter work includes versions of plays or poems by Tristan Bernard, Heinrich Heine, Victor Hugo, Ada Negri, Leo Tolstoy etc.

In 1897, Steuerman was a contributor to Noutatea ("The Novelty"), an independent daily published in Iași by the Jewish poet Berman Goldner-Giordano. This short-lived gazette had a relatively obscure history, and one of its contributors, the maverick socialist Garabet Ibrăileanu reportedly forgot to mention it in all his later accounts of the period. Its regular contributors were young supporters of left-wing ideologies: alongside Steuerman and Giordano, they include poet Mihail Codreanu and future jurist Eugen Heroveanu. With Codreanu, Steuerman (who usually disguised his name under the signatures Rodion, Aster, Leander and Tristis) took charge of the literary column and the poetry section. They were sporadically joined by other writers, among them Laura Vampa, Alexandru Toma, I. A. Bassarabescu, George Ranetti etc.

=== Rise to fame ===
Steuerman focused on his work in the journalistic genre. In 1901, Goldner's edited a selection of his friend's contributions, as Ele ("Them"). Four years later, Dacia publishers issued Rodion's critical essay about the classical Jewish humorist Cilibi Moise. At that stage, the Jewish writer was encountering resistance from the antisemitic literary movement in Moldavia. One such incident occurred when, as A. Trestianu, he published his poems in the magazine Arhiva, Organul Societății Științifice și Literare. That collaboration ended abruptly, when Gheorghe Ghibănescu, the editor in chief, discovered that Trestianu was a Jew, and ordered his staff to destroy the physical evidence of Rodion's correspondence.

In 1903, Steuerman married Angela, daughter of Iași-based Jewish folklorist Moses Schwartzfeld, and was integrated into the Schwartzfeld family. Rodion also became a literary chronicler at Ordinea ("The Order"), published by the Conservative-Democratic Party, and held a similar position at Alexandru Bădărău's Opinia ("The Opinion"). The latter employed him as its main editor for several years on end: Steuerman wrote three simultaneous columns in Opinia, and (Dafin argues) was "the paper's true soul." He was perpetually interested in new social and cultural developments, and enthusiastic about the birth of cinema, writing in Opinia about the coming demise of demise, and probably authoring the advertorials about "moving-picture soirées" in Iași.

During those years, Rodion began a cordial correspondence with Ion Luca Caragiale, the self-exiled Romanian playwright. Himself a noted proponent of Jewish emancipation and Jewish Romanian literature, Caragiale viewed Steuerman as one of his best Jewish friends, a group which also includes Dobrogeanu-Gherea, dramatist Ronetti Roman, journalists Barbu Brănișteanu and Emil Fagure, as well as Steuerman's own publisher Șaraga. Around 1907, Caragiale publicly stated his admiration for Steuerman and Ronetti Roman. His words of praise irritated nationalist historian Nicolae Iorga, who published the antisemitic review Neamul Românesc: in one of his articles for that magazine, Iorga reported that Caragiale was a sellout to Jewish interests. Caragiale indirectly reacted to this accusation in 1908, when he satirized Iorga's scholarly ambitions with a mordant epigram that was first published in Convorbiri Literare.

Meanwhile, Rodion was becoming a Romanian expert on the poetry of Heinrich Heine. In 1910, he published a comparative study of Heine and Édouard Grenier; a year later, the volume Complicele lui Heine ("Heine's Accomplice"). His work established Rodion's reputation outside Moldavia: in Transylvania, critic Ilarie Chendi noted that, with Dumitru Karnabatt and some others, the "fecund" Steuerman was still maintaining alive the tradition of cultural journalism. Diversifying his contributions, he published in Opinia and Ordinea his introductions to the work of Oscar Wilde. Obtaining Caragiale's blessing, he regularly put out quatrains with humorous commentary of political affairs. Rodion also rallied with Viața Socială, a left-wing paper put out in Bucharest by the republican agitator N. D. Cocea. At Iași, he and Goldner-Giordano were invited to write for a regional newspaper of record, Gazeta Moldovei. In 1912, Steuerman's review of French-language studies of Romanian literature, from Theodor Cornel to Léo Claretie, saw print in the newspaper Românul of Arad. The same year, again signing A. Trestianu, he returned to Arhiva with a translation from Carmen Sylva.

Despite literary recognition, and probably because he was perceived as a foreigner, Steuerman was not invited to join the newly created Romanian Writers' Society (SSR). He ridiculed the SSR's xenophobia in a series of articles for Ordinea and Opinia. His comments enlisted negative reactions in Chendi's Cumpăna magazine, where it was implied that Rodion risked awakening latent antisemitism, but were defended by his more liberal colleagues at Noua Revistă Română. At around the same time, Rodion had become a sympathizer of Josef B. Brociner and his "Society of Romanian Israelites"—a local branch of Hovevei Zion and one of Romania's first Jewish political associations.

Steuerman befriended the much younger Benjamin Fondane (born Benjamin Wechsler in 1898), to whom he was known as bădi ("uncle") Adolf or Adolphe. Their camaraderie and kinship (Fondane was Moses Schwartzfeld's nephew) doubled as literary training: around 1912, when Fondane was aged 13, Steuerman reviewed his debut verse and encouraged him to continue. Reportedly, Rodion also helped introduce his relative to the socialist circles of Iași.

=== World War I ===
During the first stage of World War I, when the Kingdom of Romania maintained its neutrality, Rodion grew close to the political circles comprising Germanophiles, neutralist socialists or pacifists. Like his colleagues there, Rodion was not a keen supporter of making Romania part of the Entente camp; he looked with more sympathy toward the German Empire and the Central Powers. He was allied with Panait Zosin and Sebastian Moruzzi, two left-wing dissidents from the Conservative-Democratic Party. Rodion contributed to Zosin's press organ, Îndrumarea, which advanced election reform and complete Jewish emancipation.

In June 1915, Avram Steuerman was assigned a regular column in Seara, a Bucharest newspaper founded by Germanophile agitator Alexandru Bogdan-Pitești and purchased from him by a German cartel. The Seara pieces, which he signed as Rodion and collectively titled Scrisori din Iași ("Letters from Iași"), sought to depict the Moldavian state of affairs in lively colors, with noted stress on the spread of Germanophile sentiment. They notably covered the conflicts between the academics of Bucharest and Iași, in particular the largely unsuccessful attempt of University of Bucharest envoys to attract Iași University staff into a national pro-Entente organization. The project was opposed by the Germanophile group of former socialist Constantin Stere and rendered ineffectual when Stere's own rival, Rector Matei Cantacuzino, also advised against it.

Drafted into the Romanian Land Forces as a military physician, Rodion saw action throughout the Romanian Campaign, retreating with the army into Moldavia after Bucharest fell to the Germans. His activity in the besieged province is said to have been exemplary throughout the period; in 1917, Rodion had reached the rank of Major. Although he had discarded socialism, he was denounced as suspect following the leftist demonstration in Iași that was led by Max Wexler. Reportedly, he was assigned to a secluded army unit on the Tazlău River, while his case was processed. He feared that a death squad would dispose of him, and became an insomniac. He was later stationed in the village of Căiuți, where he read in Opinia that Fondane's father Isac Wechsler had died. In a letter of condolence he addressed to the Wechslers, Rodion stated: "here [...] death stalks us with every step and makes us love life."

After Romania signed a separate peace with the Central Powers, and following the demobilization of summer 1918, Steuerman returned to Iași. Back into civilian life, Rodion was, like George Topîrceanu, one of the combatants whom the war years had rendered even more critical of the Ententist option; from Moldavia, he sent his texts to be published in Stere's explicitly Germanophile review, Lumina, and, at the same time, began contributing to Scena, the daily owned by conscientious objector A. de Herz. Lumina hosted a second series of his Scrisori, beginning in June 1918. During the same month, Rodion was also a correspondent of the short-lived leftist tribune Umanitatea, launched in Iași by the Bessarabian Germanophile Alexis Nour, and noted for its advocacy of total Jewish emancipation. On July 27, Opinia published Steuerman's eulogistic commentary on the political essays of Stere's follower Dimitrie D. Pătrășcanu; Pătrășcanu's text, grouped under the headline Vinovații ("The Guilty Ones"), constituted an indictment of both the Entente and the National Liberal Party, Romania's main Ententist group.

=== Suicide ===
Avram Steuerman-Rodion was haunted by memories of the war, and, according to historian Lucian Boia, suffered episodes of clinical depression which he both concealed and left untreated. He was also addicted to hypnotics. His condition steadily deteriorating, Rodion became suicidal. On September 19, 1918, he died after intentionally overdosing on morphine. He left several manuscripts, such as Frontul vesel ("The Merry Front", a collection of sonnets) and Însemnări din război ("Notes from the War").

The news of Steuerman's suicide shocked his colleagues and friends in the political-literary community. Homages and obituary pieces were printed in various Romanian press venues, including Lumina, Scena and Opinia—the latter also featured a special commemorative piece by future novelist Cezar Petrescu, La mormântul unui confrate ("At the Tomb of a Brother in Arms", September 26, 1918). A year later, in his columns for Scena daily and the Zionist paper Mântuirea, Fondane paid homage to his deceased uncle. These texts linked Rodion's suicide to desperation over the surge of antisemitism, to chronic insomnia, and to gerontophobia.

== Literary contributions ==
According to literary historian Zigu Ornea, Rodion, a "minor poet", was one of the young writers and activists instrumental in supporting the Romanian socialist patriarch Constantin Dobrogeanu-Gherea, who was at the time caught in an ideological dispute with the dominant conservative group Junimea. The other figures listed by Ornea in this context are Stere, Ibrăileanu, Dimitrie Anghel, Anton Bacalbașa, Traian Demetrescu, Emil Fagure, Raicu Ionescu-Rion, Sofia Nădejde and Henric Sanielevici. In his earlier Istoria literaturii române synthesis, the influential literary critic George Călinescu chose to discuss Rodion and Berman Goldner-Giordano together, as two minor representatives of Dobrogeanu-Gherea's "tendentious art". In his 1894 articles, Steuerman defined himself as an advocate of socialist-themed literature, admonishing his colleague Bacalbașa for having strayed away from this path.

Steuerman-Rodion left literary works which bridged socialist tendentiousness with his own cultural priority, Jewish assimilation. One of his poems reflected his dual identity, rendered dichotomous by the spread of antisemitism:

Voind prin versurile mele,
Cu două neamuri să mă-mpac,
La unul am luat durerea,
La celalt graiul – s-o îmbrac

Translation:

Wishing, through my verses,
To make my peace with both peoples,
I took from one its sorrow,
From the other the speech – as cover

According to Fondane: "Rodion wanted to live. That is a habit people tend to have, and Rodion wanted life, the same as a leaf of grass or the bird of flight. The son of a people with sideburns and robes, that survives by assimilation with earthworms, with stones, with mankind, with plots of land, his force has bumped [...], like a fly, upon the wall of the world..." Fondane noted that Rodion, with his "painfully Romanian style of writing" at a time when Zionism was still "vague", could only opt in favor of erasing his own Jewish identity. Steuerman's Romanian patriotism, frustrated by the antisemitic establishment, led him to write what are arguably his most-quoted lyrics:

Tu nu mă vrei, o, țară
Eu, totuși, sunt al tău,
Tu poți să-mi pui hotare,
Să mă-mpovări de rău.

Translation:

You may not want me in, o country,
But, nonetheless, I'm yours,
However you may fence me out
And burden me with wrongs.

Rodion's verses were described as particularly eloquent in depicting the misfortune of Jewish intellectuals who sought integration into Romanian society but were still rejected—the piece is called "agonizing" by Zigu Ornea, and "immortal" by poet-essayist Radu Cosașu. However, Romanian and Israeli academic Michael Shafir noted that, with similar texts by Ronetti Roman, Steuerman-Rodion's poem mostly reflected the disbelief with which Jewish intellectuals were reacting to the late-19th-century antisemitic barrage. According to Shafir, this reaction was an undignified "lament": "Steuerman-Rodion [...] sounds more like a lover rejected by his woman than a counter-combatant of the socialist persuasion".

Steuerman won more admiration for his prose. Writing in 2010, Lucian Boia noted that Rodion's Scrisori din Iași were "a veritable chronicle", "minutely researched and written with talent". Boia found the overall Germanophile bias of Scrisori to be palatable: "the impression they leave is that Iași was sharing in only too little measure the 'Ententist' pathos of Bucharest; an exaggeration of sorts, but also a fair amount of truth." An old adversary, Nicolae Iorga, was particularly impressed by Rodion's memoirs from the battlefield. These, Iorga wrote in 1934, are "deeply sincere and truly emotional" notes.

== Legacy ==
According to the overall verdict of George Călinescu, Rodion and Giordano were "insignificant" contributors to Romanian literature, exclusively preoccupied with "the Semitic drama". In the same generation, Șerban Cioculescu reviewed most such socialist poets as "second-rate" and "faint". Such assessments were later issued by Michael Shafir, according to whom Rodion is "(justly) forgotten", and Cosașu, who calls him "obscure".

One to be influenced by Rodion was his own nephew Fondane: according to Ornea, it was Rodion and poet Iacob Ashel Groper who first got Fondane interested in Judaism as a distinct literary subject. Fondane is also believed to have chosen the title of his column in the Zionist journal Lumea Evree, Idei și oameni ("Ideas and People"), as a quote from and homage to Steuerman. In 1919, the same magazine hosted a philosemitic essay by Romanian cultural promoter Gala Galaction, which deplored the marginalization or persecution of Jewish writers, from Barbu Nemțeanu to Rodion. Excluding reprints in the various Romanian magazines, three posthumous selections of Rodion's work were published, as books, after the war: Frontul Roșu ("The Red Front", sonnets, 1920); Cartea Băiatului meu ("My Boy's Book", memoirs, 1924); Îndepărtări ("Detachments", essays, 1936).

Rodion's political case resurfaced during polemics launched by the Romanian antisemites and the antisemitic fascists, down to the end of World War II. Poet and Premier Octavian Goga outlined his self-declared hatred for the Jews and call for discriminatory policies in his political tracts, but, unusually in this context, stated that he held no such grudge against either Rodion or Ronetti Roman. According to Radu Cosașu, Rodion's failure to integrate announced the similar drama of 1930s Jewish writer Mihail Sebastian, who wanted to be perceived as Romanian but was in return vilified by the far right. In 1941, the authoritarian regime of Ion Antonescu published a directory of Jewish Romanian authors, living or deceased, whose work was officially banned: Steuerman was included, under the erroneous spelling Steverman.

Although negative in substance, the brief profile published in George Călinescu's Istoria... (first edition 1941), alongside other portraits of Jewish literary men and women, is sometimes referred to as an act of defiance to Antonescu's cultural pronouncements. The goal of recovering Steuerman's contribution was consciously taken up by Jewish scholar and anarchist Eugen Relgis, who wrote about him in one of his own literary essays.
