= Traian Demetrescu =

Romanian writer, novelist (1866–1896)

Traian Rafael Radu Demetrescu
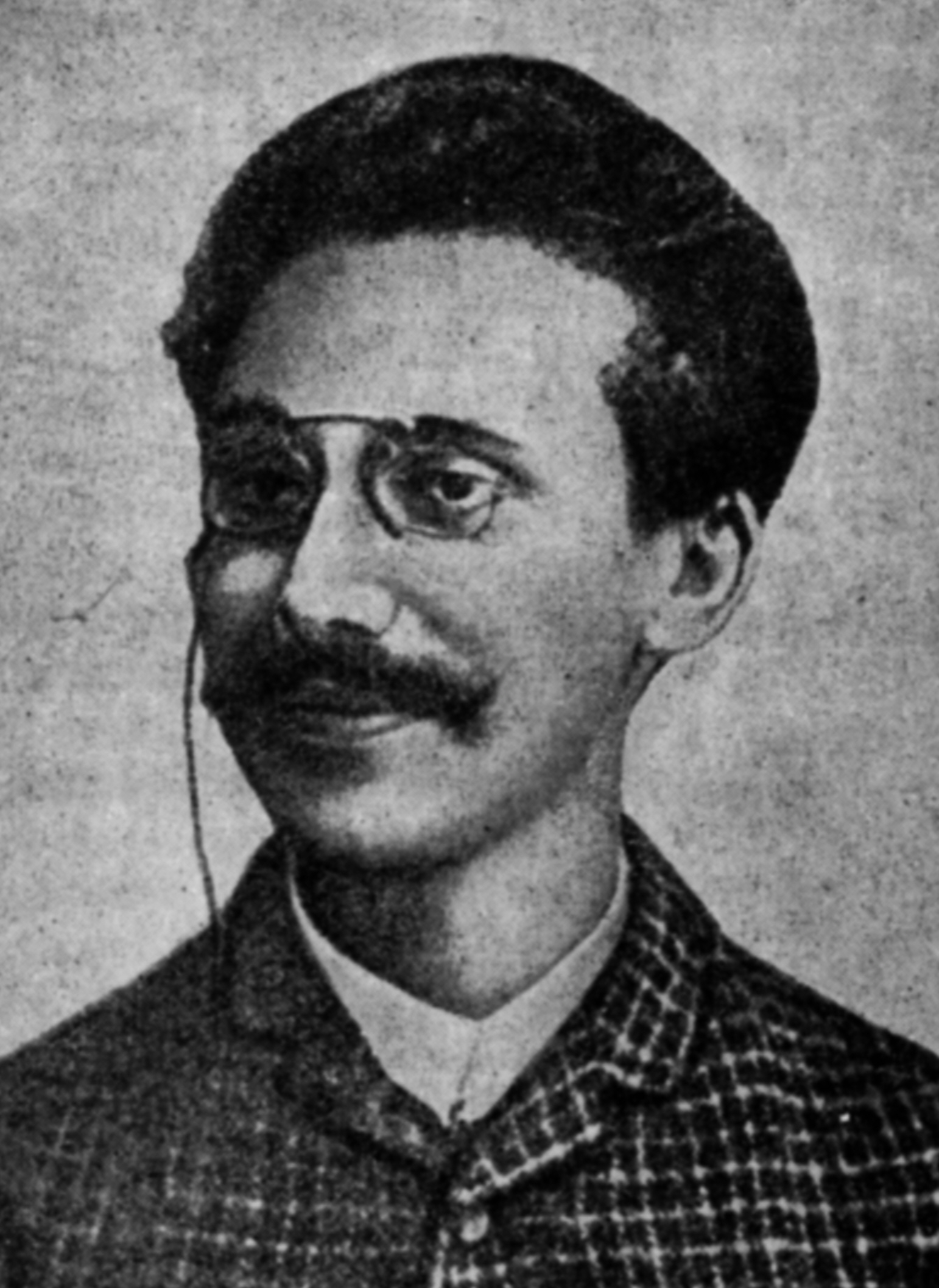
- Born: December 5, 1866; Craiova, United Principalities of Moldavia and Wallachia
- Died: April 9, 1896 (aged 29); Solca, Austria-Hungary
- Occupations: Poet; journalist; novelist; short story writer; translator
- Writing career
- Pen name: Tradem
- Period: 1884–1896
- Genres: lyric poetry, psychological novel, short story, novella, memoir
- Subjects: literary criticism, social criticism, theater criticism
- Literary movement: Impressionism, Naturalism, Realism, Symbolism

Traian Rafael Radu Demetrescu (Romanian pronunciation: [traˈjan rafaˈel ˈradu demeˈtresku]; also known under his pen name Tradem or, occasionally, as Traian Demetrescu-Tradem; December 5, 1866 – April 17, 1896) was a Romanian poet, novelist and literary critic, considered one of the first symbolist authors in local literature. Influenced by French writers such as François Coppée and the Decadent Maurice Rollinat, as well as by the local poet Mihai Eminescu, he was made popular by his poems, many of which served as the basis of popular romanzas. Receptive to impressionism and naturalism, he wrote a number of psychological novels and several short stories, some of which are remembered for their melancholic and occasionally macabre themes.

Also noted for his socialist convictions and his contributions as a journalist, Demetrescu advocated an original view of literature, which, despite placing emphasis on progressivism, was distinct from the Marxist views of his contemporaries Constantin Dobrogeanu-Gherea and Constantin Mille. A friend and associate of the influential poet Alexandru Macedonski, he played a minor part in a lengthy polemic with the conservative literary society Junimea, and authored a series of essays and memoirs documenting the Romanian intellectual environment.

Tradem was affected by the infectious disease, tuberculosis, which his contemporaries said was to be found in the depressive or exuberant tones in his writings. His original take on poetry served to inspire the Romanian symbolist groups. He is seen as a predecessor to Ştefan Petică, N. Davidescu and George Bacovia, while his prose was an influence on Caton Theodorian.

== Biography ==
Born in Craiova, Traian Demetrescu was the son of a pub owner known by the name of Gherbea; he had a sister, Victoria, and two brothers. One of them, Radu Demetrescu, graduated from the Theatrical Conservatory in Bucharest, where he befriended actor and future avant-garde dramatist George Ciprian, together with whom he was later employed by the National Theater Craiova.

Tradem kept memories of the house where he grew up, and especially of the fact that it was situated "among trees". After attending the Carol I High School in his native city, he was withdrawn by his parents, and sent to work in a shop—he was nonetheless able to complete his studies after taking private lessons in 1884. Later in life, he admitted being upset over having been forced to quit school, and indicated that he had to surmount "a lot of obstacles" in order to improve his situation.

It was during the same period that he debuted as a poet, having one of his pieces, titled Ploaie din senin ("Sudden Rain") published by the local magazine Vocea Oltului. His contributions attracted Alexandru Macedonski's attention, who praised his abilities and re-published some of his lyrics in his Bucharest-based journal Literatorul. In autumn 1884, on their way to Paris, Macedonski and his wife Anna stopped in Craiova to meet with Tradem. Four years later, the latter recalled being gripped by "tremors of emotion" upon receiving his mentor's visit.

The two writers grew closer after Macedonski returned from his trip, and frequently engaged in discussions on scientific and philosophical topics. Tradem recalled having spent an entire summer in Macedonski's Bucharest house. However, they came to disagree and eventually grew estranged—answering to claims that Macedonski was a vain and vindicative man, Tudor Vianu, his friend and biographer, indicated that this and other splits occurred "without coldness and the heart's versatility".

In March 1888, together with the lawyer G. D. Pencioiu, Tradem founded Revista Olteană, a magazine dedicated to literary and social criticism. In one of his articles, Demetrescu justified the new enterprise, arguing that Craiova displayed "a kind of snoozing, a sickly indifference in respect to intellectual life." He and Pencioiu were soon joined by other journalists, among them Nicolae Basilescu, Eduard Hübsch, Ralian Samitca, Moses Schwarzfeld, and Henric Streitman.

Revista Olteană was loosely based on the socialist magazine Contemporanul, although their respective ideologies were rather different. Tradem's leftist viewpoints did not set the tone for the publication, and was contrasted by Pencioiu (the latter, although he respected Karl Marx's views, remained a supporter of liberalism). The publication met with financial difficulties and ceased to be issued after March 1890, but was revived by its original founder and the poet Carol Scrob in November 1891 (when it became a supplement for the local newspaper Economistul). Demetrescu probably had a disagreement with Scrob, and left soon after—the magazine survived his departure, but suddenly ceased print just months after. In summer 1892, he withdrew to the locality of Cilieni, where he completed Intim ("Intimate"), his most influential poetry volume.

During that period, Tradem was especially close to the socialist circles, and, in turn, their members held him in high esteem. In 1890–1892, he was also a collaborator for Constantin Mille's leftist newspaper Adevărul, one of his notable contributions being a study on the works of poet Théodore de Banville. During spring 1893, he became a member of the short-lived Romanian Social-Democratic Workers' Party, and helped organize it at a grassroots level, together with, among others, Alexandru Radovici and George Diamandy (Demetrescu ran the Craiova base, Radovici was active in Galaţi, and Diamandy represented the Romanian diaspora). Traian Demetrescu defended Constantin Dobrogeanu-Gherea in his polemic with Junimist leader Titu Maiorescu, and, after 1893, was among a group of younger socialists to mount a press campaign against Junimea (other people in the group included Dimitrie Anghel, Anton Bacalbaşa, Emil Fagure, Garabet Ibrăileanu, Raicu Ionescu-Rion, Sofia Nădejde, Henri Sanielevici, Constantin Stere, and Avram Steuerman-Rodion). One other socialist writer with whom Demetrescu came to associate at the time was the future Orthodox priest Gala Galaction.

Over the early 1890s, Demetrescu's condition worsened, and he sought treatment for tuberculosis in the Alpine climate regions of German Empire and in Austria-Hungary. In 1894, he was in Munich and later at the Rheyer Villa in Bad Reichenhall. He subsequently traveled to Vienna, where he visited the Cathedral of Saint Stephen. The following year, he was present in the Bukovinian town of Solca, where he attempted to cure his illness by living in the close proximity of firs and breathing in the scented air. Tradem's efforts were fruitless, and he died one year later, at the age of 29, after a particularly severe episode of hemoptysis.

== Works ==
=== Style ===
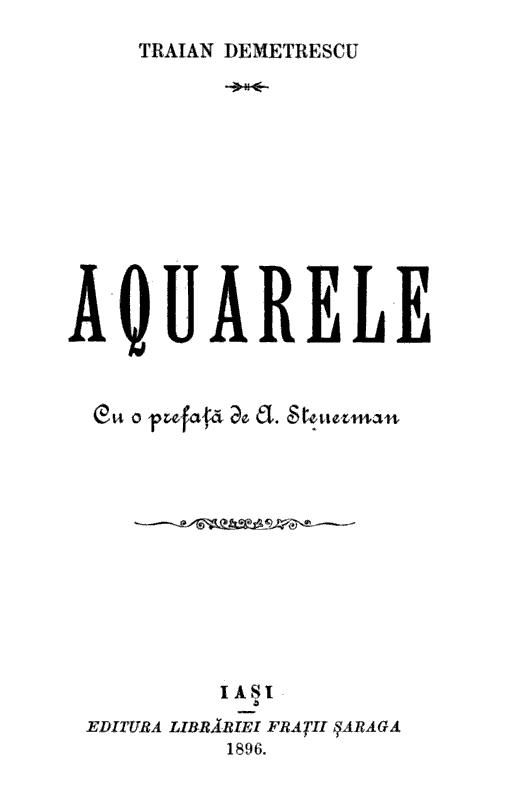
First page of Aquarele, 1896

Literary historian George Călinescu described Traian Demetrescu as "one of the first [Romanian] poets with «fits of nerves» and «thrills»". He commented at length on Demetrescu's character and in particular his eccentricities, attributing them to the problems posed by tuberculosis. According to Călinescu, Tradem was "alternatively exuberant and silent", with "unhealthy dumbnesses", and described by his acquaintances as having "a monstrous mixture of virginal purity and horrifying mental ruin". Rumors collected by Călinescu had it that the poet was made emotional by even "the rustling of dresses", and that he could become seriously upset if his friends did not have "good perfumes" in their houses. This was connected to what Călinescu deemed "sensory sharpness" and attributed to his disease: in one instance, Demetrescu was reportedly moved "to the brink of fainting" by the sensory images of a rose garden.

George Călinescu indicated that Demetrescu was a read man, who was well-acquainted with works by some major figures of Medieval literature (François Villon), Renaissance literature and Humanism (Dante Alighieri, Petrarch, Torquato Tasso), the Age of Enlightenment (Jean-Jacques Rousseau, Antoine François Prévost), and Romanticism (Giacomo Leopardi, Edgar Allan Poe, Alfred de Vigny, William Wordsworth). Tradem was especially interested in the literature of his day, and read realist authors such as Fyodor Dostoevsky, Dumas fils, Henrik Ibsen, Leo Tolstoy, Ivan Turgenev, and Jules Vallès. He was also familiar with the contributions of naturalists, impressionists, and symbolists,—among them Émile Faguet, Edmond Haraucourt, José María de Heredia, Jules Lemaître, Pierre Loti, Guy de Maupassant, Sully Prudhomme, Jean Rameau, and August Strindberg—, as well as with members of the Groupe des Vivants—Raoul Ponchon and Jean Richepin. A noted influence on his choice of subjects was François Coppée, while Tradem's imagery was many times inspired by the Decadent author Maurice Rollinat.

Early in its existence, Revista Olteană published many critical studies by Demetrescu and others, in which they discussed the literary works of the 19th century. Among the figures analyzed by him were Coppée, Louise-Victorine Ackermann, Paul Bourget, Alfred de Musset, as well as the Romanian Romantics Vasile Alecsandri, Dimitrie Bolintineanu, Mihai Eminescu, Veronica Micle, Nicolae Nicoleanu, and Mihail Zamphirescu. Alongside these pieces were theater chronicles he signed, showing that he closely followed developments on the local scene. He also translated several foreign dramatic pieces into Romanian.

Despite taking an interest in Symbolism, Demetrescu is known to have declared himself perplexed by their "bizarre originality". Instead, he looked up to Realism and Naturalism, and called on young writers to study the works of Dostoevsky, Maupassant, Georg Brandes, Alphonse Daudet, Honoré de Balzac, Gustave Flaubert and Émile Zola. Tradem defined his style of literary criticism as "Impressionist", taking for his model Anatole France—in this assessment of France's style, he focused on one of the latter's statements ("The good critic is one who recounts his soul's adventures among the masterpieces").

Nevertheless, he was an immediate precursor to the Romanian Symbolist school, or a representative of its "proletarian" side. Discussing this latter aspect, literary critic Paul Cernat notes that Demetrescu stood alongside Mihail Cruceanu, Alexandru Toma and Andrei Naum, all of whom merged a socialist discourse into their poetic vision, thus contrasting with Macedonski's post-Parnassian school, as well as with the balladesque literature produced by Ștefan Octavian Iosif. According to Călinescu, Demetrescu's commitment to Symbolism was especially obvious in his attitudes, which he argued were linked to "spleen" (a humoralistic term used by Charles Baudelaire to define melancholy). In Călinescu's opinion, the Symbolist elements in Demetrescu's writings served to explain his close relationship with Macedonski, which contrasted with their backgrounds and political opinions. Researcher Lidia Bote proposed that Macedonski and Demetrescu were both eclectic figures representing a period when Symbolism was one of the many competing influences, and argued that a "pure" Symbolism only imposed itself in Romania after 1902, when Ştefan Petică published his earliest poems.

Demetrescu was one of Romania's earliest socialist poets, in the same generation as Constantin Mille and Ion Păun-Pincio, and a versifier of socialist battle hymns. According to his own words, Demetrescu had studied "the works of great socialist writers". He also took interest in the works of Evolutionists and Positivists such as Herbert Spencer, Jean-Marie Guyau, and Hippolyte Taine. His sympathy for the proletariat accompanied his political credo. As Călinescu noted, he was mostly preoccupied with the plight of certain discriminated social groups, such as prostitutes, Jews, alcoholics, aging artists, orphans, the insane, as well as strolling performers such as the Romani tribe of the Ursari; his compassion extended to old dogs that had been chased away by their masters. Several of his poetry writings published by Revista Olteană had an obvious socialist message. In one of the essays published there, Tradem discussed the implications of the 1888 peasants' uprising in the Romanian Old Kingdom: he rejected the view that rebels had been manipulated by the political class, and argued that the real causes were fatigue and the threat of starvation.

=== Literary disputes ===
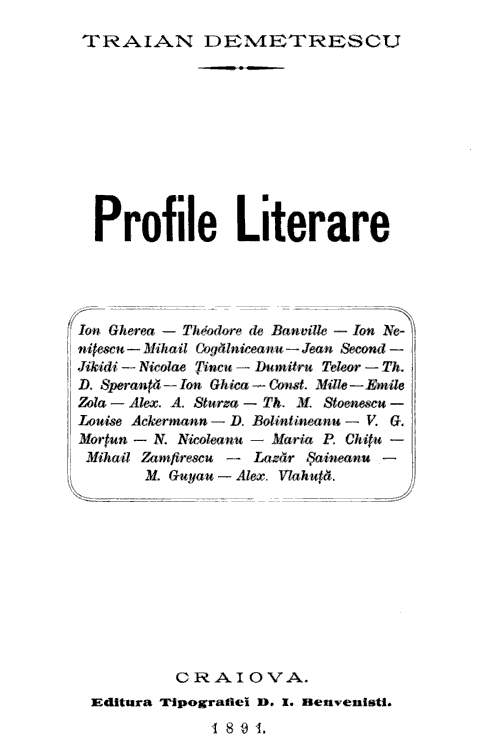
First page of Profile literare, 1891

Traian Demetrescu was influenced by Constantin Dobrogeanu-Gherea and supported him in conflicts with Titu Maiorescu, showing that he did not endorse the Junimist views of an "art for art's sake". He believed Maiorescu was valuable, but no longer relevant. Nevertheless, he was critical of socialist arguments, in particular the notion that the value of literary works resided in their social message. Instead, he mediated between the two visions, arguing in favor of progressive messages and stressing that "art should not have beauty for its sole purpose". This position was also illustrated in his Positivist critique of Romanticism, which saw Tradem arguing that art "is a product of the social environment". He was however persistent in arguing that there was no absolute connection between social classes and artistic creation.

In parallel, he was involved in a dispute with Raicu Ionescu-Rion and Garabet Ibrăileanu, after he allowed psychological novel techniques to seep into his prose and spoke in favor of the Decadent movement (placing decadent novels on equal footing with works of social criticism). His primordial interest in the subjective experience led him to claim that there was no possibility for a completely objective perspective (an idea akin to his Impressionist tenets). He argued: "I understand the word writing to mean the original, superior and beautiful gift of materializing a personality, an artistic temperament, in the shape of words. But this disposition does not always manifest itself with the exactitude of clocks; it is often capricious and pertains to various exterior and psychic causes. First of all, the artist needs an absolute material self-sufficiency which may lead him away from all common employments that kill or weaken the most beautiful forces of talent. Not all poets are born rich like Alecsandri; and since in our country literature has not yet come to live off public support, it is only natural that one often sees talented poets abducted by political journalism or the glitter of other jobs which provide them with the means of existence..."

His relative independence was visible in his work of essays, Profile literare ("Literary Profiles"), where he attacked writers on both sides with what Călinescu argued were "unforgiving judgments". Thus, when discussing his fellow leftist Mille, Tradem described his poetic works as "boring". In reference to Mille's works, he stated: "Without profound meditation, without sensitivity, without imagination, an artist cannot become anything other than, at most, a fecund and passable worker, and not an illustrious figure that would endure."

Beginning in 1888, Tradem also authored short memoirs of his many meetings with Macedonski, in particular of their conversations. He recalled being familiar with many of Macedonski's original theories on various subjects, including astronomy and the works of Camille Flammarion. Demetrescu noted that Macedonski's theories claimed to explain the workings of the Universe in "a different way" and based "on his imagination", but argued that "for a moment [in conversation], it seemed like he could convince anyone". He also recorded that the theistic Macedonski answered "positive science" with "the grin of skepticism". Nevertheless, according to Tradem, Alexandru Macedonski flirted with Naturalism during the early part of his career, and admired the works of Gustave Flaubert and Émile Zola. His memoirs also provided detail on Macedonski's interest in visual arts, indicating that the older poet had always wished to become a painter, and that his determination had instead shaped the artistic career of his son Alexis.

At times, Demetrescu was contradicting himself. Călinescu noted that Tradem initially described Florile Bosforului ("The Flowers of the Bosphorus"), a book of poems by the Bolintineanu, with enthusiasm, but later considered them "banalities [and] light-hearted fantasies". Similarly, he was initially supportive of Vasile Alecsandri when Macedonski derided his works, but later came to consider many of his poems "a husk of banal words, not animated by any powerful thought, and a very often riddled with intolerable grammatical mistakes." In this context, Demetrescu opposed the aging Romantic poet to a new generation of intellectuals and artists, one he believed was expressing and favoring "the fracticious, daring, deep thoughts". However, soon after Alecsandri died in 1890, he wrote: "In these times of neuroses, of deceptions and pessimism [...] Alecsandri's poetry is like a harmonious and beneficent music. He was a great poet, an illustrious patriot, and a joyful person." His views of Mihai Eminescu also oscillated between rejection and praise, but, with time, the latter became a major influence on his own style.

=== Poetry ===
Călinescu linked Demetrescu's Symbolist-like "spleen" this to a "nostalgia for mysterious lands", which he found to be one of the poet's main themes. In one of his poems, Tradem pined for a different climate:

La nord, în ţări ploioase,
Cu melancolice popoare,
Sunt visători ce plâng şi sufăr
De nostalgii de soare...

Translation:

Up north, in rainy lands,
With melancholic peoples,
There are dreamers who sob and suffer
Due to nostalgias for the sun...

Similarly, one of his poems deals with the unknown forces dragging sailors out to sea:

De la o vreme, marinarul Trăia mai trist şi mai retras, Şi veşnic părea dus pe gânduri În ascultarea unui glas...

Era un cântec de departe, Un imn de-oceanuri şi de mări, Pe care-l auzea întruna Ca nişte triste aiurări [...]

Translation:

For a while now, the sailor
Has been growing sadder and more secluded,
And always seemed to be deep in thought
Listening to a voice...

It was a song from far away,
A hymn of oceans and of seas,
One he kept hearing
As sad ravings [...]

Traian Demetrescu's poetry often included lyrical depictions of depressive moods. This was notably present in a poem depicting the landscape of winter:

Ninge! Ninge!... Alb e satul!... Ninge! Ca un cântec e iubire Soarele în nori se stinge Ninge! Ninge!... Alb e satul!... Ninge!

Câinele sub şoprul putred Urlă... Rar o cucuvaie ţipă Într-o dărâmată turlă... Câinele sub şoprul putred Urlă...

Translation:

It's snowing! It's snowing!... White is the village!...
It's snowing!
Like a song of love
The sun extinguishes in the clouds
It's snowing! It's snowing!... White is the village!...
It's snowing!

Under the rotten shed, the dog
Is barking...
From time to time, an owl shrieks
In some run-down steeple...
Under the rotten shed, the dog
Is barking...

In analyzing Tradem's contributions, George Călinescu also indicated that, especially in interior scenes, the poet focused on images of "boredom", which "immerses [his] soul in the color black". In one such setting, the clock becomes "the satanical and exact instrument measuring the vigil". The poem in question read:

Şi-mi măsoară insomnia
Şi durerea cu compasul
Prins în zid, în taină bate
Ceasul...

Translation:

And it measures my insomnia,
And my pain, with a compass
Hung on the wall, secretly pounding,
The clock...

The imagery and tone of Tradem's poetry have been described by Călinescu as "heartbreakingly pathetic". This atmosphere, he argued, gave them originality, although he believed that they were not accomplished pieces ("a great many of his [poems] are prosaic").

In addition, he praised Demetrescu the poet for his musical feel, and especially for his rendition of "the acoustic of fluids" (extending to images of the Olt River, fields of grain swept by the wind, and currents of air passing through trees on the Danube shore). Also according to Călinescu, Tradem was a musical person, who loved classical music, in particular the cello and the zither, and who often introduced concrete references to composers of "sad music" in his poems. The latter category included Frédéric Chopin and Carl Maria von Weber, whom Tradem invoked as a means to highlight his moods. In one of his poems, he wrote:

Erau în miez de noapte, târzii şi tainici ore...
Parcă simţeam pe Weber lângă clavir murind!...

Translation:

Come midnight, there were late and secretive hours...
It seemed I could sense Weber dying by the piano!...

=== Prose ===
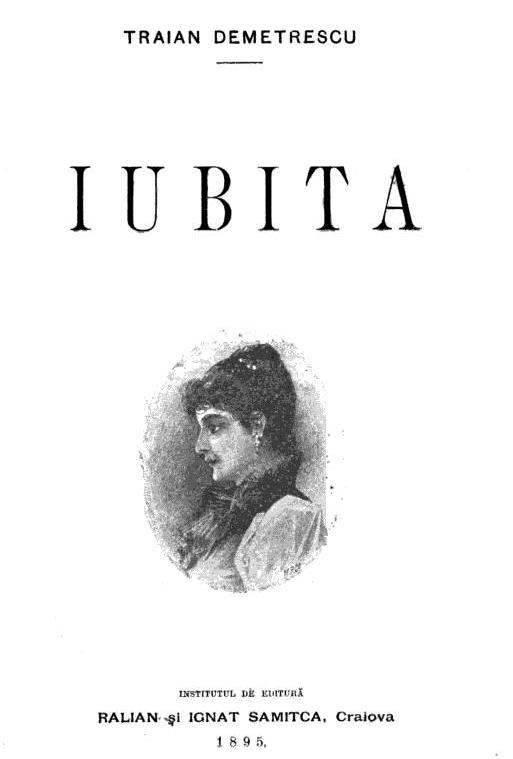
First page of Iubita, 1895

Demetrescu's prose works include a series of novellas and shorter literary pieces, as well as two novels. According to Călinescu, many of the former two were generally lyrical in nature, being centered on the author's subjective experience. Themselves melancholic, they were dismissed by the critic for displaying a "sentimental humanism which is foremost loved by the plebs".

Tradem's collected short stories, Refractarii ("The Fracticious Ones"), portrays various misfit characters, and its subjects occasionally turn to the macabre. In one of them, the protagonist Costin is shown to be heartbroken when a malicious child destroys his favorite flower. In one other novella, a medicine student steals the corpse of a beautiful woman from the morgue, and hangs her skeleton on his wall. Various of his stories and essays also compliment cultural figures whose works Tradem enjoyed. Alongside mentions of Chopin and Weber, they reference Edgar Allan Poe, Fyodor Dostoevsky, and Camille Saint-Saëns.

His two novels both deal with the subject of unrequited love, and George Călinescu argued that they were in fact disguised eulogies. The critic also argued that they showed Tradem to be "too moon-struck to be understood by women". One of them was titled Iubita ("The Lady-Love"), and showed the protagonist, a teacher named Emil Corburescu, falling in love with his pupil's sister—although she does not reject his advances, she eventually marries a more adjusted person. Călinescu concluded that "[Corburescu] is a failure". Similarly, Tradem's Cum iubim ("The Way We Love") deals with Nestor Aldea, a young law student who encounters a beautiful blond woman while promenading in a park: the two fall in love, but she refuses to marry Aldea. They meet each other again after she has married, and end up committing adultery. Călinescu dismissed the work, stating: "Everything [in it] is vapory, as annoying as a thick fog."

== Legacy ==
Many of Tradem's poems gained popularity for their musical nature. Many of them served as inspiration for composers (such as George Stephănescu, who used them as lyrics for his songs), while others survive as romanzas. Among the latter was a stanza many believe to be anonymous:

Călugărul din vechiul schit
O zi la el m-a găzduit,
Şi de-ale lumii am vorbit...
Iar când să plec l-am întrebat:
"Ce soartă rea te-a îndrumat
Să cauţi loc printre sihaştri?"
El mi-a răspuns: "Doi ochi albaştri!"

Translation:

The monk from the old hermitage
Has hosted me for one full day,
And we discussed matters of the world...
And when I was to leave I asked:
"What cruel fate has directed you
To seek a place among the recondites?"
He answered me: "Two blue eyes!"

According to Călinescu, Tradem's Refractarii, with its depictions of misfits, announces the short stories of Ioan Alexandru Brătescu-Voineşti, while his intense love for rose gardens recalls the poems of Symbolist Dimitrie Anghel. Demetrescu's poetry has been a direct influence on Symbolists such as Ştefan Petică, Radu D. Rosetti, N. Davidescu, and especially George Bacovia. Călinescu noted that Tradem and Bacovia shared important traits: "proletarian sentimentalism, a fracticious attitude, morbid nostalgia, sad «philosophies» and most of all the tone of a heartbreaking romanza". Refractarii has also influenced the non-Symbolist Caton Theodorian.

Both Tudor Vianu and Davidescu focused on Traian Demetrescu's place of origin as a staple of his style, and spoke of Demetrescu, Macedonski, Ion Minulescu and others as representatives of "Wallachian Symbolism", in contrast with Moldavians such as Bacovia, Petică, and Benjamin Fondane. In their view, Demetrescu and his fellow Wallachians was less focused on depicting obscurity and melancholy, and more precise in approach.

Tradem's legacy notably comprises his presence in the memoirs of Nicolae Condiescu, a fellow Craiova citizen, and a eulogistic mention in one of Bacovia's poems (titled Amurgul, "The Crepuscule"). Shortly after Demetrescu died, Gala Galaction wrote an article which proclaimed him as the model intellectual for "the happy days toward which humanity was taking its [...] steps..." In 1950s Communist Romania, his socialist leanings brought him official endorsement, at a time when many other writers were dismissed as "bourgeois" (other literary figures to be awarded such recognition due to their political opinions included Ion Păun-Pincio and Dumitru Theodor Neculuţă).

In Craiova, Demetrescu is honored with a bust in his likeness, which was erected some ten years after his death, following intense campaigning by Adevărul journal. In 1978, the local authorities in that city have instituted the Traian Demetrescu-Tradem National Poetry Contest, which takes place annually. The festivities are occasionally hosted by the descendants of Tradem's relatives. His name was also given to a high school in the city and to the Traian Demetrescu House of Culture (which is itself financed by the local authorities). There is a Traian Demetrescu Street in Craiova, and others of the same name in Braşov, Sibiu and Timișoara.

== Published works ==
- Poezii (poetry, 1885)
- Freamăte (poetry, 1887)
- Amurg (poetry, 1888)
- Cartea unei inimi (poetry, 1890)
- Săracii (poetry, 1890)
- Profile literare (essay, 1891)
- Intim (poetry, 1892)
- Sensitive (poetry, 1894)
- Iubita (novel, 1895)
- Privelişti din viaţă (1895)
- Aquarele (poetry, 1896)
- Cum iubim (novel, 1896)
- Simplu (1896)
