= Seara (newspaper) =

Daily newspaper published in Bucharest, Romania

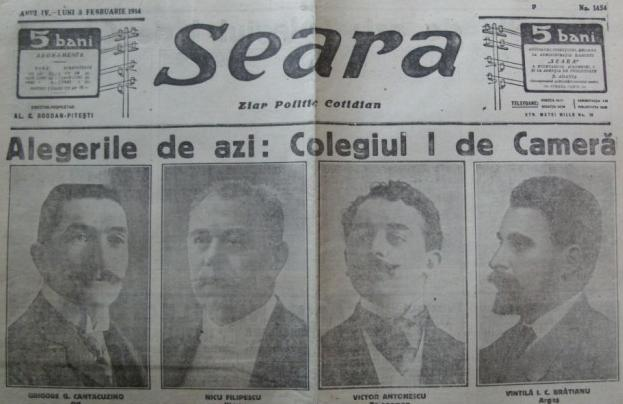
- Title page of Seara, with pictures of candidates in the 1914 elections. Left to right: Grigore Gheorghe Cantacuzino; Nicolae Filipescu; Victor Antonescu; Vintilă Brătianu
- Type: Daily newspaper
- Owner: Grigore Gheorghe Cantacuzino
- Publisher: Alexandru Bogdan-Pitești
- Editor: Tudor Arghezi
- Founded: 1910
- Ceased publication: 1916
- Headquarters: Bucharest, Romania
- Country: Romania

Seara (Romanian pronunciation: [ˈse̯ara], meaning "The Evening") was a daily newspaper published in Bucharest, Romania, before and during World War I. Owned by politician Grigore Gheorghe Cantacuzino and, through most of its existence, managed by the controversial Alexandru Bogdan-Pitești, it was an unofficial and unorthodox tribune for the Conservative Party. Its involvement in politics sparked numerous scandals, the longest of which came during the neutrality period (1914–1916). Strongly anti-Slavic, Seara stood out in that context for supporting the German Empire and Central Powers, and was widely alleged to have been financed by a German propaganda machine. In 1914, it was purchased by German businessmen, but continued to register mediocre success in comparison with its pro-Entente competitors. In late 1916, after Romania decided in favor of the Entente, Seara was disestablished.

Noted for publishing the biting satirical pieces and art chronicles of Tudor Arghezi, Seara was closely associated with the Romanian Symbolist movement. Through Arghezi, Bogdan-Pitești and other contributors, it campaigned in favor Symbolism and, after 1913, popularized modern art. Although paying tribute to political conservatism throughout its existence, Seara was also home to anti-establishment contributors, allies in the anti-Entente cause. The newspaper sympathized with the Social Democratic Party, regularly hosting opinion pieces by socialists and anarchists.

== Before 1914 ==
=== Beginnings ===
Like the daily Minerva, Seara was originally a creation of G. G. Cantacuzino, the Romanian magnate. Cantacuzino, who supported the Conservative Party inner faction of Alexandru Marghiloman, refrained from attaching his name to Seara, later entrusting Bogdan-Pitești with the position of manager. In 1910, the year of its foundation, Seara also followed the Conservative doyens Petre P. Carp and Nicolae Filipescu, supporting Carp's strict monarchism and suggesting that the "Carpist–Filipescan" line was one of moral superiority.

Early in its existence, Seara reported on various events agitating public opinion, such as the Romanian Orthodox Church division between the traditionalists and those who supported communion with Rome. In one of its first issues, it hosted a disclaimer by Roman Catholic chanoine Joseph Baud, who calmed enraged Orthodox believers by assuring them that their Metropolitan Bishop Iosif Gheorghian had not died a Catholic. Later, Seara gave significant coverage to what it called "scandals in the Vatican", particularly so in the 1911 controversy surrounding Father Verdesi's conversion to Methodism; this prompted the Romanian Catholic press to list Seara among those newspapers "at odds with Christian ideas".

At that stage in its history, Seara was also sympathetic to the cause of ethnic Romanians living abroad, in Transylvania and other regions of Austria-Hungary: in August 1911, it sent special correspondents to cover the congress of Romanian activist groups in Blußendref (Blaj). The newspaper also reported with disapproval on the growth of nationalism among the Hungarians, covering for a Romanian public the division of Hungarian Socialists along pro- and anti-nationalist politics, and accusing the Károly Khuen-Héderváry administration of subverting the Romanian National Party (PNR). Seara's articles gave exposure to the PNR's official reaction, as voiced by that party's speaker Alexandru Vaida-Voevod. It called Vaida-Voevod "one of the [PNR's] brilliant leaders", responsible "to a great extent for the rescue of party discipline and national solidarity".

In March of the next year, Seara published an homage to journalist and ideologue Constantin Stere, noted for having brought back together the two factions of the PNR, and concluded: "Mr. C. Stere, although involved in our country's partisan politics, [...] has transmitted to our quarrelsome brothers a peace message from all of us, proving that the foremost preoccupation of our minds is and will be national solidarity, the pure love for the holy cause of Romaniandom." It later discussed the conflict between PNR politicians and Khuen-Héderváry's successor, László Lukács. In his reply to the PNR (paraphrased by Seara), Lukács equated the Romanians' political emancipation in Transylvania with militant irredentism, and prophesied that Transylvania was in real danger of being invaded by the Kingdom of Romania. Seara retorted by accusing Lukács of supporting "preemptive" Magyarization in "the multilingual Kingdom of Hungary".

The paper was also taking an interest in the political affairs of the Balkans. Shortly before the Balkan Wars, it published the appeal of Simion, a Greek Romanian politician and editor of Bucharest's Patris gazette, who gathered support for a Greco–Romanian alliance against the South Slavs. Simion posited that Romania and the Kingdom of Greece would eventually reach an understanding over the litigious issue of Aromanian nationhood, and blamed the conflict on "shrewd" Slavic meddling.

=== Moderate Symbolism ===
Seara also made known its artistic credo, placing itself in the margin of Romanian Symbolism. According to art historian Dan Grigorescu, its awareness of European literature and its cultural effervescence, like those of Facla, Viitorul and other Romanian periodicals with special cultural pages, were impressive. Up to April 1911 (when he was made director of the National Theatre Bucharest), Ioan Bacalbașa was Seara's theater columnist. According to his colleagues in the Transylvanian press, Bacalbașa's columns for Seara and Epoca were a courageous defense of national literature.

During his time at Seara, Bacalbașa was seconded by poet Dumitru Karnabatt, later a political chronicler for the same newspaper. Karnabatt introduced the stage work of Henry Bataille (Issue 271/1910) and the Aestheticism of Oscar Wilde (editorial piece, Issue 52, 1910). Elsewhere (Issue 425/1911), Seara covered the hitherto supposed discovery of an unknown novel by Honoré de Balzac. Around that time, Karnabatt's own literary contributions for Seara were samples of Symbolist, Decadent and Impressionist travel writing, sometimes written together with his novelist wife Lucrezzia.

Lucrezzia stopped writing for the paper in 1911, probably as a result of conflicts she had with Bogdan-Pitești, her marriage to Dumitru on the brink of failure. Sometimes signing as "Don Ramiro", Dumitru remained affiliated with Seara, and in charge of its artistic policies. The newspaper's traditional conservatism was still being reflected in its artistic choices. During late 1910, Karnabatt gave poor reviews to the more rebellious Symbolist painters to emerge from the Tinerimea Artistică salon, and deemed the primitivist sculptor Constantin Brâncuși a madman.

In January 1911, the same author used the newspaper to publicize his dislike of Futurism, a modern art and anti-establishment current originating in Italy. Reviewing the Futurist Manifesto, he called for "demented" author Filippo Tommaso Marinetti to be "tied down". Karnabatt further proposed that Marinetti's exacerbated modernism was an atavistic manifestation of the Barbarian Invasions: "an absurd heredity within the Italian people, this people of art and of idealism". Closely following similar developments in French culture, Seara supported Jean Richepin's protest against "excessive modernism" and the division of labor. The pro-Richepin article, signed by Prince Constantin de Brancovan, saw print in Issue 53/1911.

In Decadent spirit, Karnabatt's essays in Seara advocate a reevaluation of Rococo and fête galante aesthetics. He was revolted by "the horrors of contemporary painting"—Pissarro, Monet, etc.—, citing as his reference "the fine and erudite art critic, the independent and courageous" Sâr Péladan (who was, incidentally, Bogdan-Pitești's mentor). In a September issue, "Don Ramiro" Karnabatt declared himself horrified that some were proposing to honor the inveterate gambler Avrillon with a public monument, announcing that France had given in to "vice". By then, he was giving positive reviews to "decadent poets" of the "dead cities" (Georges Rodenbach, Dimitrie Anghel), and enthusiastic about the establishment of community theaters to promote a "noble and pure art", away from "the platitudes and pettiness of modern life".

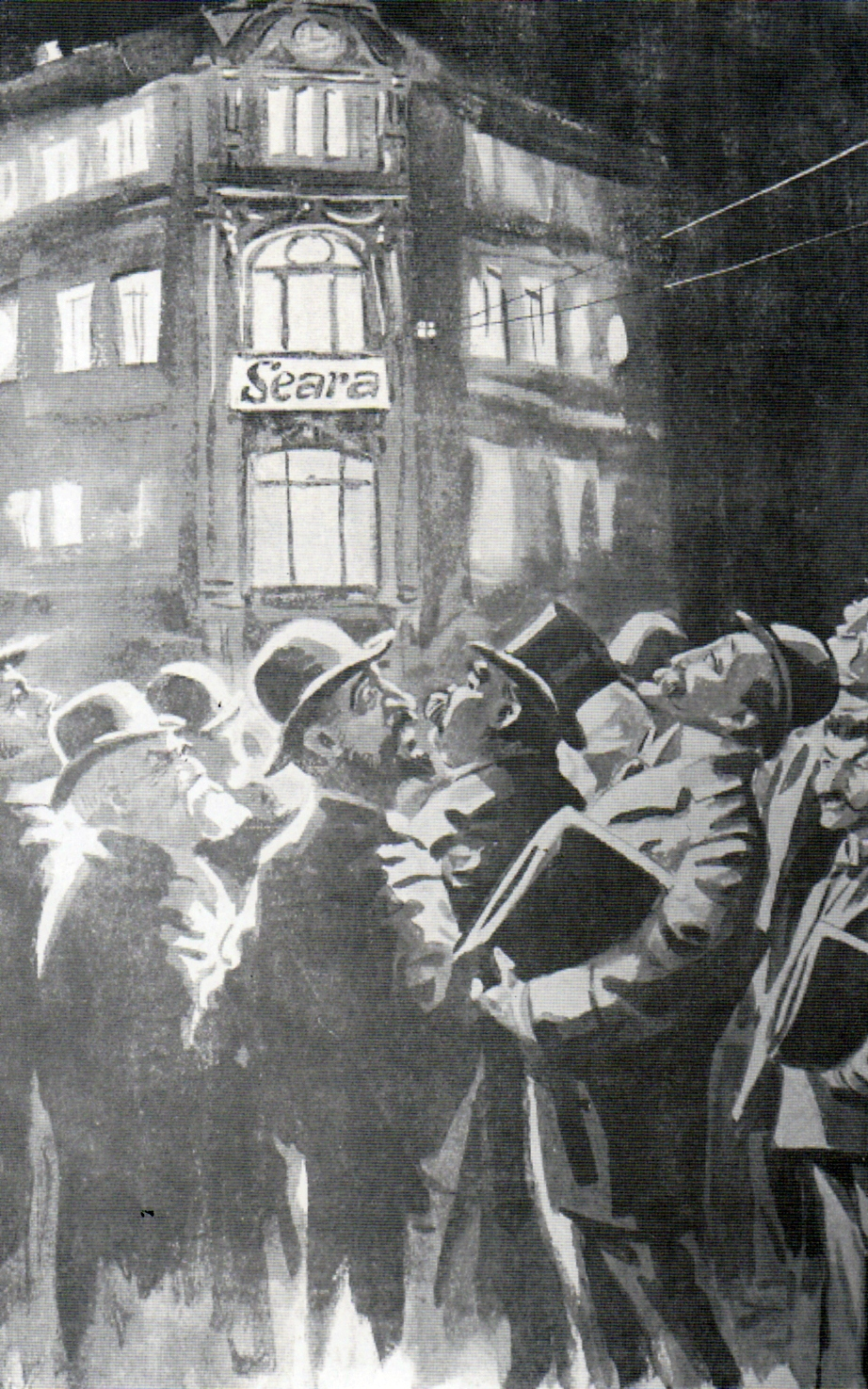
Ion I. C. Brătianu, Take Ionescu, Alexandru Bădărău, and Titu Maiorescu, "waiting for the latest issue of Seara". 1913 cartoon by Seara contributor Nicolae Petrescu Găină

In Seara, "Don Ramiro" was also contributing to the publicity campaigns mounted by Symbolist doyen Alexandru Macedonski and by Macedonski's painter son, Alexis. For Karnabatt, their contribution to Symbolism was a horizon "of violent and tormented passion". Seara's support for Macedonski's cosmopolitanism earned Karnabatt criticism from the anti-Symbolist Transylvanians.

=== Blackmail scandals ===
During spring 1913, Cantacuzino formally liquidated his business, and Bogdan-Pitești was officially installed as manager of Seara. According to the rival satirical magazine Furnica, although Seara was "stillborn" when it came to commercial success, the move was intriguing for the reading public. The conservative principles stated by Cantacuzino seemed largely incompatible with the radical activism that had made Bogdan-Pitești a mistrusted public figure. Bogdan-Pitești, whose background was in French anarchism, announced that the new editorial line centered on some of Cantacuzino's bugbears: universal suffrage, feminism, land reform, Jewish emancipation etc. In March of that year, Seara was also joined by a most fervent contributor, the poet and lampoonist Arghezi.

Although supporting the Conservative Party before and after that moment, Seara was focusing its efforts on attacking the Conservative-Democratic Party of Take Ionescu, with whom the Conservative Premier Titu Maiorescu had formed a coalition (one resented by Cantacuzino and Bogdan-Pitești). In this context, critic Ion Vianu notes, Seara became "an aggressive publication, with a history of base attacks and blackmail." The anti-Ionescu discourse was notably outlined in an Arghezi article of September 11, 1913. It collectively and disparagingly identified the Conservative-Democrats (or Takists) as ciocoi ("upstarts"), accusing them of having repressed in blood the 1907 peasant revolt: "They are the symbol of 1907, when, his arms, chest, shoulders and back loaded with ravens, with ciocoi, the peasant tore himself away from his field, split himself, fought to chase them away and [...] fell down murdered by the claws that clutched down, tore down into his flesh and reached inside to his soul and killed it as well. These ciocoi, we will eradicate." In a 1913 issue, Romanian Land Forces General Ștefan Stoica referred to Ionescu's men as craii de Curtea-Veche ("the Old Court rakes"), another colloquialism for "upstarts".

One of Seara's prime targets was Public Works Minister Alexandru Bădărău, called "filthy con man", accused of taking massive bribes from American investors in Romanian oil and of employing in his staff some 150 women in exchange for sexual favors. Nicolae Titulescu, the young Conservative Democrat politician and bureaucrat, was ridiculed for having acquired, through his foreign connections, an original tapestry from the Gobelins Manufactory. Notably, senior politician Nicolae Fleva lent his pen to these allegations, writing in Seara that Bădărău had serious psychiatric problems. Documenting Bogdan-Pitești's Catholic faith and Arghezi's anticlericalism, Seara lampooned the Orthodox Church, and was discredited as the offshoot of "Papist propaganda".

According to literary critics such as Barbu Cioculescu and Vianu, Seara may have had for its informant the Symbolist writer Mateiu Caragiale—a client of Bogdan-Pitești's, he had become a chief of staff for Bădărău. In diaries he kept after his split with Bogdan-Pitești, Caragiale himself alleged that Seara's publisher was being paid to harass "without pity, in biting manner, all those whom Cantacuzino would grace with his unfriendliness or antipathy", in particular the Conservative-Democrats. Although he never signed articles for Seara, Caragiale was by then receiving regular payments from its patrons.

At the peak of Cantacuzino's negative campaign against the Conservative-Democrats, Seara also attacked private enterprises, including the Marmorosch Blank Bank. Bogdan-Pitești was taken to court by owner Aristide Blank, and N. Fleva organized his defense. According to the records kept by Caragiale, Blank effectively set a "trap" with the cooperation of Romanian Police, and Bogdan-Pitești, found guilty of blackmail, was sentenced to nine months in prison. Seara fared badly during the period, and was out of print by autumn 1913.

=== Modernist platform ===
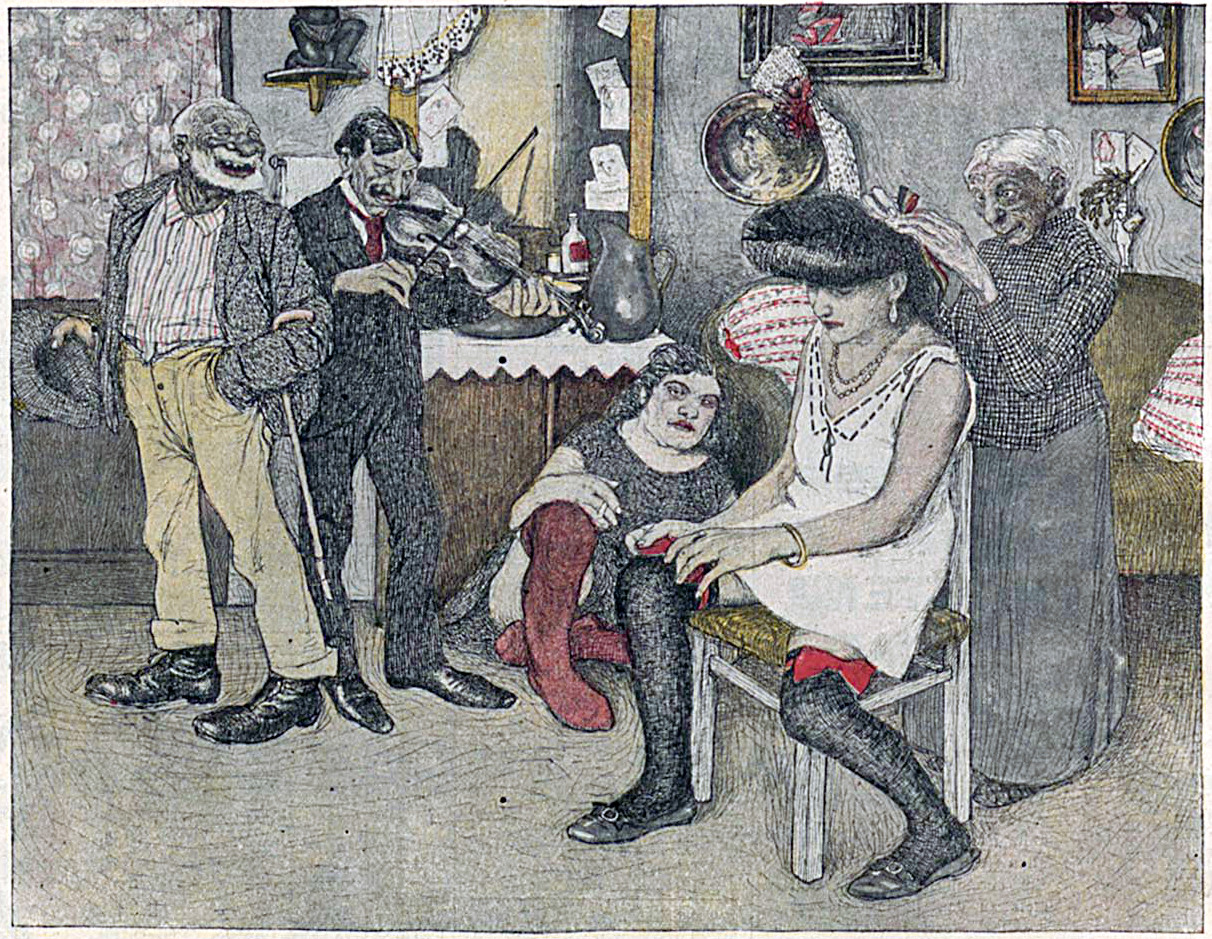
Pascin's drawing of a Romanian brothel scene, published by the German magazine Simplicissimus

Before and after the 1913 hiatus, with Bogdan-Pitești and Arghezi at its helm, Seara expanded its range, encouraging the development of modernist literature, and playing a part in the transition from Romanian Symbolism to 20th century avant-garde. Its art chronicles celebrated the international success of modern artists Constantin Brâncuși and Pascin, both of whom, Seara argued, were culturally tied to Romania. Revising its stance, the newspaper published Arghezi's account of the new Tinerimea Artistică modern art exhibit (April 1913), mentioning Bogdan-Pitești's role as an art patron and instigator of change. The two intellectuals also promoted the works by young artist Theodor Pallady, most notably with a series of articles in which Arghezi spoke about Pallady paintings in the Bogdan-Pitești collection. The magazine, already noted for publishing political cartoons by Nicolae Petrescu Găină, was also joined by Marcel Janco, known later for his work as a Dada and Constructivist artist.

During those years, Seara also enlisted two poets formerly affiliated with Simbolul review: the Imagist Adrian Maniu and the experimental Symbolist Ion Vinea. By summer 1914, the latter's articles included jibes against the moderate Symbolist figure Ovid Densusianu, ridiculing his disciples at Versuri și Proză magazine (the beginning of a dispute which Vinea would pursue in more depth during his time at Chemarea magazine). In addition to poetry and prose fragments, Vinea was assigned a regular column about life in Bucharest. Joining them as a contributor on film and theater, Mihail Sorbul (also known as G. Șoimaru) denounced screenwriter Haralamb Lecca for plagiarism. Also published by Seara was the Symbolist George Bacovia, with poetry pieces such as "Winter Lead", "Autumn Nerves" and "Poem in the Mirror"—generally second editions, previously published in Noua Revistă Română and other reviews; they were later included in Bacovia's lionized collection Plumb.

Himself a literary chronicler, Tudor Arghezi investigated the cultural phenomena of the day. One of his articles denounced Edmond Rostand as a kitsch author, suited to the tastes of "chromolithograph buyers." He also reviewed Wilde's comedy An Ideal Husband (Issue 1/1914) and, unusually, ridiculed the Symbolist poetry of Mateiu Caragiale. Under Arghezi, Seara popularized international modern art, notably by publishing the Fauvist drawings of André Derain.

Arghezi's main focus was on satire, which he often directed at traditionalists and ethnic nationalists, particularly those arriving in from Transylvania. One such text attacked the poet laureate Octavian Goga, accusing him and other Transylvanian refugees of hoarding bureaucratic positions in the Kingdom of Romania. In a 1913 piece, Arghezi targeted scholar Ioan Bianu for allegedly mismanaging the Romanian Academy Library: "From his longjohns and his cleated boots, Mr. Bianu has jumped straight into the aristocracy and [...] turned our library [...] into his own, Transylvanian, empire. [...] An impertinent voice submits one to a detailed interrogation. It is Mr. Bianu, a jaundiced liver with a moustache, with the evil gaze of a man who collects many salaries but is aware of his own voidness and dullness".

As part of its emancipation agenda, Seara expressed sympathy for the Romanian Jews, and, in contrast to the antisemitism of more traditionalist reviews, accepted works sent in by Jewish writers. In October 1913, Seara obtained and published a confidential order which gave Romanian Land Forces officers a free hand to discriminate against Jewish recruits. In September 1914, it hosted the journalistic debut of Jewish avant-garde author Jacques G. Costin, who was, with Vinea, caretaker of the cultural pages. Like Arghezi and Vinea, Costin experimented with satirical genres, his sketch story techniques borrowed from 19th century classic Ion Luca Caragiale (Mateiu's father). Some of the poems published in Seara were authored by Arghezi's Jewish wife, Constanța Zissu. Seara was also receiving contributions from Grigore Goilav, the Armenian Romanian ethnographer and art historian.

== Neutrality years ==
=== Germanophilia and propaganda ===
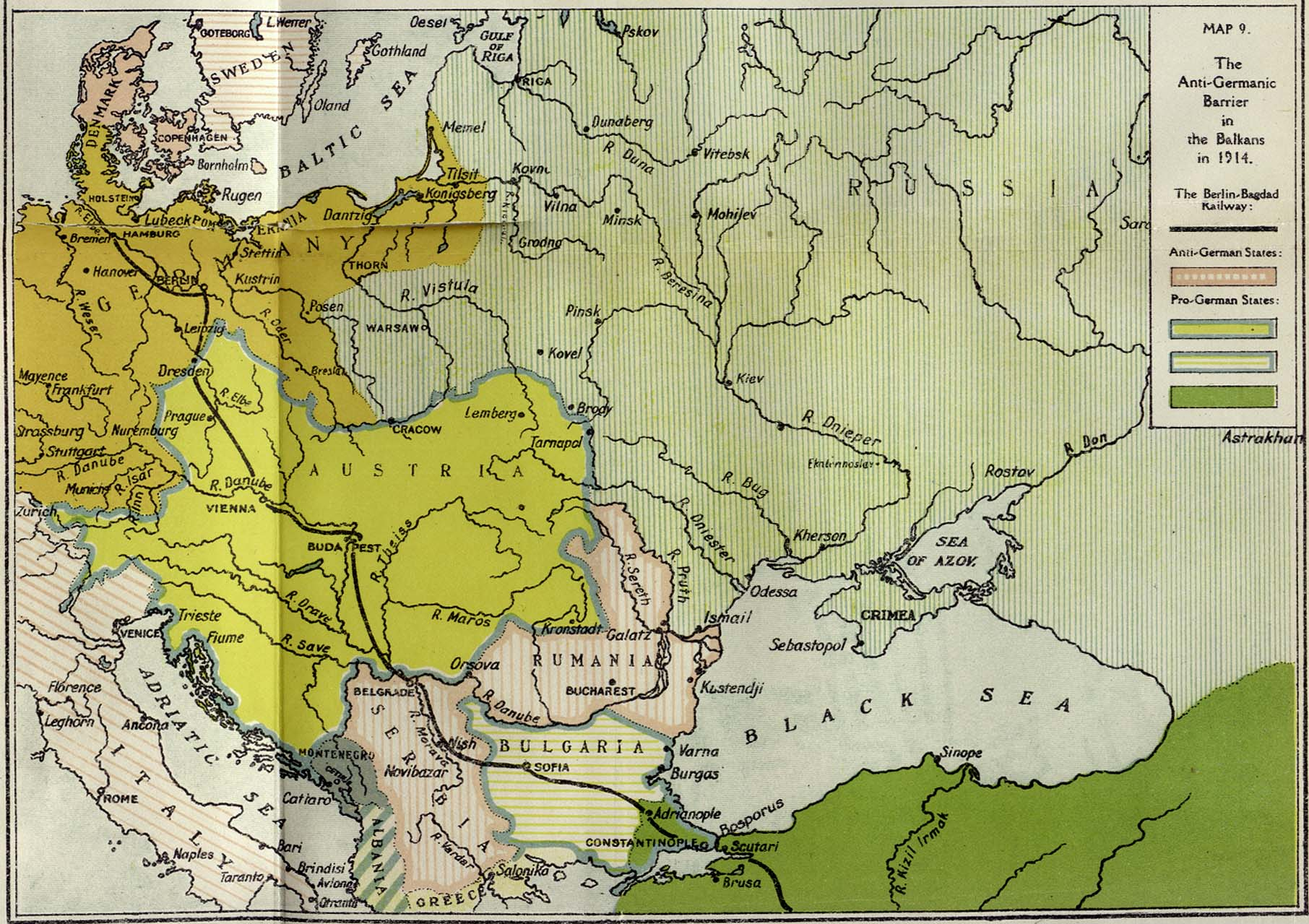
The Entente's perception of Eastern Europe in 1914, between the Russian Empire (light green) and the "pro-German states". Romania, Serbia as Entente-friendly states (pink), bordering "pro-German" Austria-Hungary, Bulgaria (yellow)

A final period in Seara's history coincided with the start of World War I and Romania's neutrality period. As public opinion divided itself between supporters of the Entente Powers and those who favored the Central Powers, Seara and Minerva stood for the latter group, the "Germanophiles". The two papers reputedly entered this competition for the public eye with a handicap. An Ententist daily, Adevărul, claimed that, together, Seara and Minerva had consumed 481 tons of paper in printing from January 1 to August 31, 1914 (for itself and Dimineața, it claimed a figure of 1,284 tons).

Like other samples of Germanophile media, Seara is widely alleged to have been the recipient of special propaganda funds from the German Empire and Austria-Hungary. According to historian Lucian Boia, Germanophile newspapers had little room for maneuver, given their unpopular agenda: "of little interest, boycotted and with their offices once in a while assaulted by the 'indignant' public, [they] could never have supported themselves without an infusion of German money." Similarly, researcher Carmen Patricia Reneti argues: "Seara would [never] have been the paper most useful to German propaganda. [...] Minerva and Seara were read by just about no one." Claims of German payments focus on Bogdan-Pitești's shady political dealings, the target of controversy since 1915. Boia notes that the patron, who had no reason for refusing German bribes, may have been genuinely committed to the Germanophile cause, regardless of such additional benefits. Boia also claims that, keeping in with a Romanian tradition of the "baksheesh", the Francophile press may also have received funds from the Entente. Contrarily, historian Ion Bulei argues that "fraudulent wheeler-dealer" Bogdan-Pitești and his "money obsessed" patron were merely directing their support toward the highest bidder. According to various accounts, Bogdan-Pitești was diverting much of his own political payments into increasing his prestigious art collection or supporting his retinue.

In contrast to other Germanophile mouthpieces, Seara stated its support for the Central Powers early on, before such financing could occur—even before its patron Cantacuzino decided which side he supported. In the months of strife which preceded the actual war, the Romanian daily published telegrams and concerned commentary about the effects of nationalism in Central Europe and the Balkans. These accused in April 1914 the Greek Kingdom and Northern Epirote militias of decimating the Aromanian community in Korçë following the murder of prominent priest Haralambie Balamaci and four other Aromanians, and urged Romanians to express their indignation. A month later, Seara was taking a stand against Romanian irredentism over Transylvania, as analyzed by the Transylvanian Germanophile Ioan Slavici. Slavici's texts scandalized the nationalist press for supporting Vasile Mangra, the pro-Hungarian priest and suspected agent of influence. However, the newspaper was also criticizing the Hungarian authorities for demanding the extradition of university student Măndăchescu. The latter, Seara reported, was wrongly accused of a bomb attack on the Diocese of Hajdúdorog, when the act was more likely attributable to the revolutionist Ilie Cătărău.

During June, Seara also circulated a rumor about secret talks between King Carol I and Nicholas II of the Russian Empire, in Constanța. Seara claimed that the two royals had agreed to oversee a shift of power, forcing a union between the Serbian and Montenegrin kingdoms against the Central Powers' express wishes. Shortly after the Sarajevo Assassination, which offered the Central Powers a casus belli, Seara circulated rumors about the contradictions between Austrians and Hungarian subjects of the double monarchy. It alleged that, instead of mourning, the Hungarian colony of Ploiești had organized "a very merry celebration" at the consulate.

In the weeks and months following the assassination, Arghezi's articles blamed the push toward war on Serbian nationalism and the Balkans question at large: "Until such time as when Europe shall incorporate and enslave the Balkans, they will endure as the nest where all of Europe's assassinations are being organized"; "the Serbs have staged an attempt on Austria[-Hungary]'s existence, in dastardly manner." Arghezi had set his mind on continued neutrality, arguing that it could turn Romania into an arbiter and broker of peace. A similar position was held by Karnabatt.

In autumn 1914, Seara and Minerva were both purchased by a German consortium, although Bogdan-Pitești was probably still the former's (uncredited) manager. The two papers were brought under a single umbrella, the publishing house Tiparul. Its board of directors included Bogdan-Pitești, publicist Josef B. Brociner, banker Roselius, and investor Josef Hennenvogel. The acquisition, which reputedly followed an increase in German propaganda and espionage all over Romania, was described as scandalous by Acțiunea, an Ententist newspaper owned by Take Ionescu. In a September 24 piece called La mezat ("On Public Sale"), it claimed that Minerva cost the Germans 3 million lei, and Seara only 400,000 lei. This allegation was confirmed during later inquiries.

One account has it that the Germans paid Bogdan-Pitești the cost of paper and printing, which had been hitherto provided, for free, by Cantacuzino. Bogdan-Pitești (and German funds) were probably involved in financing a new platform, Cronica, launched by Arghezi and Gala Galaction in February 1915. In October of that year, with probable German support, Bogdan-Pitești, Arghezi and Galaction set up another Germanophile newspaper, Libertatea ("Freedom"), presided upon, for a short while, by N. Fleva. According to one account, Fleva had earlier been approached to take over as Seara manager by German envoys Brociner and Hilmar von dem Bussche-Haddenhausen, but, realizing the implications, had refused.

=== Conservatives and socialists ===
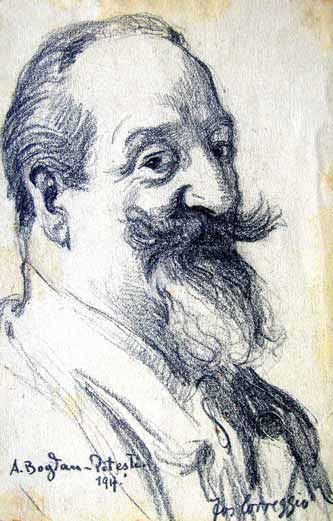
Alexandru Bogdan-Pitești in a 1917 sketch

Cantacuzino ended his period of reflection in January 1915, when he openly supported Alexandru Marghiloman in creating a pro-German subgroup within the Conservative Party. Jeopardizing their standing in the party, both men cited irregularities in the Conservative caucus.

With many of its articles, Seara popularized Marghiloman's views on conservatism and geopolitics. Conservative in outlook, the Russophobic and anti-Slavic Karnabatt outlined his political vision in some detail, discussing the Entente's imminent "bankruptcy". Ilie Bărbulescu, a Slavist and Marghiloman Conservative who advocated pro-German neutralism, also published articles in Seara during 1915. Beyond this conservative core, Seara colored its pages in various shades of left-wing advocacies, from socialism and social democracy to anarchism. According to literary historian Paul Cernat, the ideological ambiguity and conjectural alliances between socialists and conservatives was motivated by a common enemy, the pro-Entente and "plutocratic" National Liberal Party.

The independent socialist Felix Aderca, later known as a novelist, expanded on his earlier theoretical articles for Noua Revistă Română, depicting the German Empire as the "progressive" actor in the war. Through the voice of another contributor, the old anarchist scholar Zamfir Arbore, Seara was focusing its criticism on Russia's Tsarist autocracy, against whom Arbore had been fighting for decades. Similar ideals inspired Alexis Nour, who arrived to Seara from the home-grown leftist current, Poporanism. Bogdan-Pitești wrote with noted passion about his socialist allies, using the pseudonym Al. Dodan. On October 6, 1914, Dodan saluted the Social Democratic Party of Romania for organizing internationalist peace rallies, as "emerging from the mind and soul of the entire Romanian people". According to legend, the Seara patron privately declared himself a Catholic anarchist, and was rather hostile to communism.

Avram Steuerman-Rodion, a socialist based in Iași, contributed a special series of articles documenting the growth of Germanophila in that city, and throughout Moldavia region. Titled Scrisori din Iași ("Letters from Iași"), it notably chronicled the conflicts between the enthusiastically Ententist University of Bucharest professors and their more skeptical University of Iași colleagues. Seara also enlisted contributions from physician Ottoi Călin, a member of the PSDR Executive Committee and author of its Zimmerwald pacifist manifesto. Despite this agenda, Ottoi was not employed as a political panelist, but, as a practicing physician, held Seara's advice column.

=== Bessarabia vs. Transylvania ===
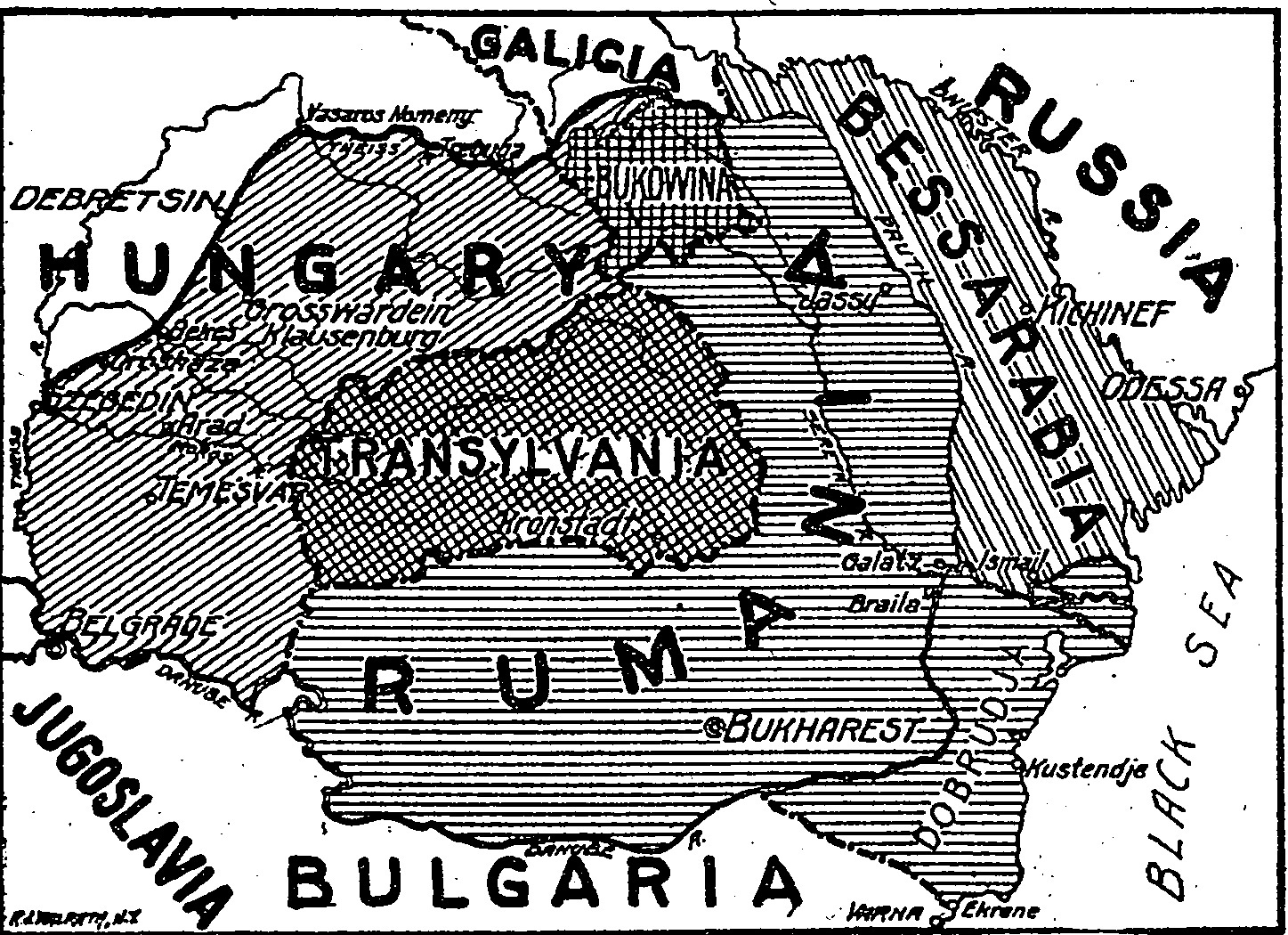
The maximalist view of Greater Romania, as described by The New York Times in 1919, and alluding to the dilemmas of 1916. To the west and north of "Rumania": Transylvania, Bukovina and other regions of Austria-Hungary, promised to Romania by the Entente; to the east: Bessarabia, Russian-held and favored by the "Germanophiles"

The national dilemma confronting Romanians during the neutrality period was not just a choice of sides, but also one of irredenta: while the National Liberal overtures toward the Entente were supposed to grant Romania Transylvania and some other Romanian-inhabited regions of Austria-Hungary, the Conservatives wished to recover Bessarabia, occupied by the Russian Empire—in 1916, the two options seemed mutually exclusive. Seara and Minerva followed the principles of Marghiloman, who had reached the conclusion that the Entente did not in fact support the disestablishment of Austria-Hungary, and who postulated that Russification in Bessarabia was more serious than Magyarization in Transylvania. Ilie Bărbulescu's Seara articles, deemed "erudite and indigestible" by Boia, focused on the supposed indestructibility of Austria-Hungary, and consoled Transylvanian Romanians with the option of greater devolution (see United States of Greater Austria). Writer Ion Gorun, who hailed from an anti-Hungarian community but was also a Habsburg loyalist, was a distinct presence at Seara. His articles favored the term "Austria" instead of "Austria-Hungary", and claimed that Romania could only find "triumph" as an Austrian ally. Gorun spoke of any alliance with Russia as dangerous and absurd; the implication of such a move, he argued, caught Transylvanian Romanians in a pincer and also meant Romania's subjugation to the Russian Empire.

The cause of Bessarabia was championed by Arbore, who at the time rejected all notion that the region could ever witness a Russian devolution, and expressed distress that Romanian intellectuals were more interested in the fate of France than in the freedoms of Bessarabian Romanians. Bogdan-Pitești's various articles also show his interest in the Bessarabian cause. Expressing regret that "most civilized" France stood by the world's "most savage, most ignorant and bloodiest oligarchy", "the Russia of pogroms and assassinations", he deemed Romania's overtures toward the Tsarist regime a "national crime". Additionally, "Dodan" suggested that Austria-Hungary was preferable as a friend, as Romania's only guarantee against the "Slavic deluge". Later, he argued that the cause of Transylvania was settled by, and within, Austria-Hungary. He mapped out an alternative strategy: neutral until the end of the war, Romania would eventually march its troops into Bessarabia, with Austrian acquiescence. In October 1915, Aderca added his voice to the Bessarabian chorus. He postulated that the Transylvanian cause was doomed, and, since the Germans were poised to win the war, constituted "a union of the losers"; instead, he urged Romania to take Bessarabia as the spoils of war. Karnabatt's own articles began by stating a minimalist objective in "the reincorporation of Bessarabia". Later, he advocated the extension of Romanian territory eastward, into Transnistria and down to the Dnieper River (as counterbalance to a foreseeable Greater Bulgaria).

An unusually vast and, according to Boia, naïve project was sketched by the Bessarabian-born Nour, who claimed that, even if granted a military victory, Austria-Hungary would still crumble into "developed nations". Nour was confident that, with the return of peace, Romania would still have an option to annex its Austrian irredenta: Transylvania, Bukovina, the Banat, Crișana and Maramureș. He speculated that a late entry into the war could also bring Romania possession of Bessarabia, large swathes of Ukraine, and the Odessa harbor; and even that, once victorious against the Entente, the Central Powers would award her an extra-European colonial empire.

== Disestablishment and legacy ==
On separate occasions in 1916, Bogdan-Pitești and Karnabatt toured the German Empire. Bogdan-Pitești was the first to travel there, together with his concubine Domnica and his favorite Mateiu Caragiale. During his own journey, Karnabatt described Germany as unified by civic order and the determination to win, in several letters that were published by Seara in June 1916. The newspaper's wrong bet on a German victory on the Western Front was strained by Alexis Nour who, in April 1916, wrote that a French capitulation would inevitably follow the Battle of Verdun.

Seara disappeared, together with Minerva, Libertatea, Steagul and most other Germanophile papers, in late summer 1916, shortly after Romania declared war on the Central Powers. When the German and Austrian troops invaded southern Romania, forcing the Ententist government to flee for Iași, some of Seara's former staff remained in Bucharest and chose the path of collaborationism. This was notably pursued by Arghezi, Galaction, Bărbulescu and Karnabatt, all of whom wrote for the propaganda tribune Gazeta Bucureștilor. According to popular rumors, Bogdan-Pitești fell out of favor with the occupiers, who eventually discovered that he had been squandering their grants.

In contrast, several former Seara contributors silenced their criticism of the Entente throughout the rest of the war. Nicolae Petrescu Găină made some contributions to the Entente's propaganda effort during the second half of 1916. He was captured by the Germans in Bucharest, allegedly after being turned over to them by Bogdan-Pitești. Avram Steuerman-Rodion was drafted into the Romanian Land Forces as a medic, earning distinction, but returned to Germanophile journalism after Romania sealed the separate peace of 1918; the victim of clinical depression, he committed suicide in autumn. An Order of the Star of Romania for his work as a military physician, Călin died of typhus in early 1917. Aderca too saw action on the front, and preserved his socialist-inspired neutralism—it later surfaced in his various fiction writings.

After the November 1918 Armistice with Germany changed Romania's fortunes, leading to the creation of Greater Romania, several former Seara journalists were prosecuted for treason. In March 1919, a military tribunal sentenced Karnabatt to ten, Arghezi to five years imprisonment. They were however pardoned by King Ferdinand I, in winter 1920. Bogdan-Pitești had joined them in prison: according to some accounts, he was also held for collaborationism, while others record, in more detail, that he was serving an earlier sentence for fraud. A while after, some of Seara's former contributors were retelling their encounters with Bogdan-Pitești and his brand of journalism by the means of autofiction. The Seara affair is notably retold in novels by Lucrezzia Karnabatt (Demoniaca, 1922) and Ion Vinea (May Venom, 1971).

Arghezi's texts for Seara were largely unknown to later generations. They again saw print in 2003, in a critical edition co-edited by daughter Mitzura Arghezi (Domnica Theodorescu) and Traian Radu. According to philologist Gheorghe Pienescu, who collected and reedited the texts for printing in the 1960s, the copies were taken from him under false pretense by Mitzura Arghezi, and never returned. As an additional contribution to Romanian literature, Seara's popularization of the expression craii de Curtea-Veche may have inspired Mateiu Caragiale in writing his celebrated 1929 novel.
