= Caton Theodorian =

Romanian writer (1871–1939)

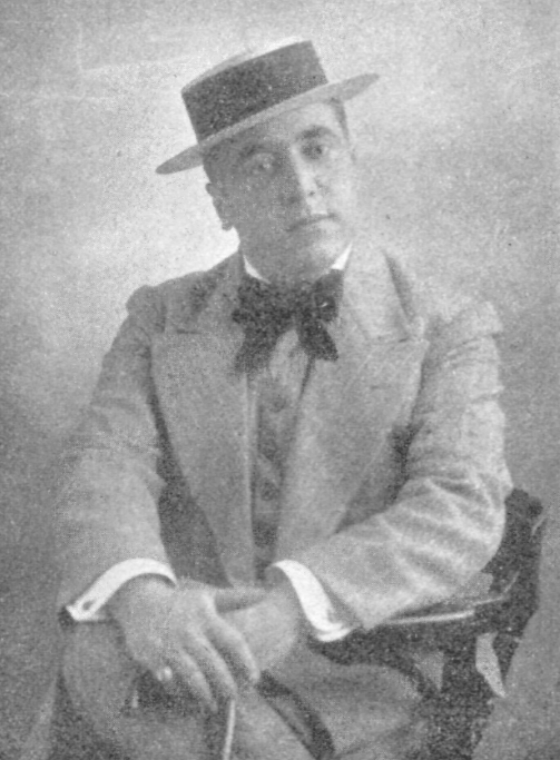
- Theodorian, photographed ca. 1911
- Born: May 14, 1871; Craiova, Principality of Romania
- Died: January 8, 1939 (aged 67); Bucharest, Kingdom of Romania
- Occupations: journalist, civil servant, stage actor
- Writing career
- Pen name: Alexandru Răzvan, Olymp, Zaveră
- Period: 1890–1939
- Genres: tragedy, comedy, farce, sketch story, novella, memoir, psychological novel, lyric poetry
- Movements: Naturalism; Literatorul; Sburătorul

Signature
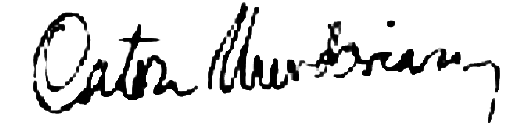

Caton Theodorian, or Teodorian (May 14, 1871 – January 8, 1939), was a Romanian playwright, poet, short story writer and novelist. He was a maternal nephew of the politician Eugeniu Carada through his Oltenian father, a scion of the boyar nobility. His noble origins informed his chief works in both naturalistic fiction and drama, which mainly deal with social decline and boyar obsessions with heredity. Although showcased by the National Theatre Bucharest, Theodorian's plays were dismissed by critics as vulgar or wordy, and were sometimes rejected by the public. His most treasured contribution was a 1915 comedy, Bujoreștii ("The Bujorescus"), which synthesizes his recurrent themes. A moderate in ideological terms, the writer never openly affiliated with either the Romanian Symbolists or their Sămănătorul rivals, but frequented and was published by both. During the final twenty years of his life, he was attached to the Sburătorul circle.

In addition to writing, of which he did relatively little, Theodorian worked as an actor and prompter, a newspaper editor, and finally as a clerk. He had jobs with various state regulatory bodies, and several times with the Romanian Police, briefly serving as commissioner in Vâlcea County. He then had a prominent position in the Romanian Writers' Society, but resigned due to political disagreements during the early stages of World War I. Like his brother Mariu Theodorian-Carada, Caton disliked the Entente Powers, and opposed Romania's entry into the war. He spent the war years fleeing occupation and bombardments, moving from Valea Mare to Iași, then to Paris, Lausanne, and Bern. He returned to a prominent job in the Romanian Arts Ministry, and, in his final year, took an executive position in the new General Directorate of the Press and Propaganda; he was also the founder, and for long president, of the Society of Romanian Dramatic Authors.

== Biography ==
=== Origins and early life ===
Born in Craiova, his parents were Ion Theodorian and his wife Emma (née Carada). As noted by Mariu Theodorian, his father was often mistaken for Armenian, due to his general appearance and Armenian-sounding surname. The surname was of recent origin, having been chosen by Ion, who claimed it was the original name of his father, Praporshchik Constantin Theodor. The latter, possibly an Aromanian immigrant to Wallachia, had fought with the 1821 revolutionaries and then the Wallachian regulars, before becoming a customs officer and gentleman farmer. Through his grandmother, Uța Scărișoreanu, Theodorian descended from the lower ranks of Oltenian boyardom, but his family estates had been sold off to pay outstanding debts.

Ion, an avid reader of literature and political science, had failed as a businessman and an actor, entering the civil service of Wallachia and then that of the United Principalities (modern Romania). He was head of the police of Craiova, and then the deputy prefect of Fălciu County, where, in 1867, he quelled a tax riot of the local Jews. It was in Fălciu that he met his future brother-in-law, Eugeniu Carada, later famous as a co-leader of the National Liberal Party. The Caradas were an ethnic Greek clan of publicans and butchers, settled in Bucharest, catering to, then marrying into, Wallachian nobility. In 1870, having returned to Oltenia, Theodorian Sr organized the city's riotous opposition to Domnitor Carol of Hohenzollern (in conjunction with the failed "Republic of Ploiești"), and then, helped by Carada, advanced through the party ranks. He had two other sons in addition to Mariu (the eldest) and Caton: Ștefan and Ion "Nonu" Theodorian.

The Theodorian brothers were orphaned in 1879, when Ion died of chickenpox contracted on a political tour—as recounted in Caton's memoir, Prima durere ("The First Pain"). Mariu was adopted by his uncle Eugeniu and his aunt Sultana, while Caton began his education at the private C. Dima Popovici Institute in his native city, where his mother was the principal. He then attended Craiova's D. A. Sturdza College (1881–1885), and, according to his own testimony, was briefly colleagues with writer Traian Demetrescu. From 1885 to 1887, he attended military high school. His uncle wished for him to become an officer, but Caton ran away from school, allegedly spending some time studying in Paris, then working for Teodor Popescu's theatrical troupe as a prompter, copyist and extra. He secured his first government post in 1888, possibly through Carada's contacts.

Theodorian headed ephemeral provincial publications such as Lumina ("The Light", 1890), which hosted his literary debut, and was for a while both editor and writer at Adevărul and Naționalul, often signing as Alexandru Răzvan, Olymp, and Zaveră. For a while, he frequented Alexandru Macedonski's Literatorul circle in Bucharest, putting out poetry and prose fragments in the eponymous magazine. His first book was the 1891 collection of sketches and short stories Petale ("Petals"), with a preface by Macedonski; around the same time, he debuted as a dramatist in Craiova, with Manopere electorale ("Electoral Maneuvers") and Patima ("The Passion"). Although he remained affiliated with magazines that promoted Romanian Symbolism (Literatorul, Flacăra), he was also published in more traditionalist reviews—such as Luceafărul, Sămănătorul, and Ramuri. As noted by literary historians, he always remained "without precise affiliations", an "eclectic" and "moderate".

=== Police chief and SSR organizer ===
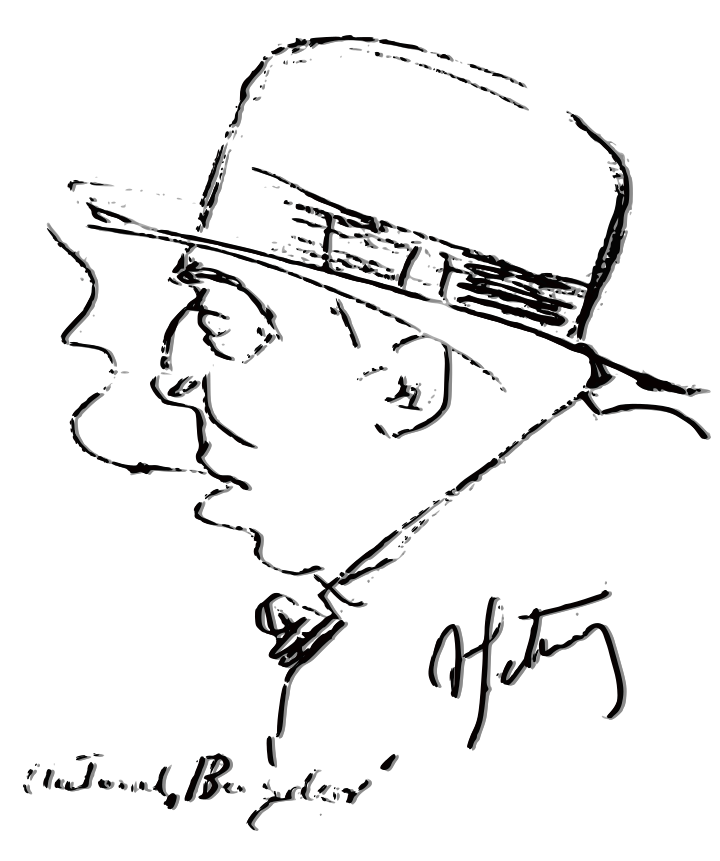
Theodorian at Terasa Oteteleșanu, January 1912 drawing by Alexandru Satmary

In parallel to his writing, Theodorian advanced through with his bureau jobs, working as second inspector for State Monopolies in 1896, and being assigned a clerical position at Bucharest Police Headquarters in 1897. In April 1898, while commanding the police unit in Gara de Nord, he apprehended a ring of mail thieves who had thrived on transited Western merchandise. Later that year, he became head of police in Râmnicu Vâlcea, mediating between his politically ambitious brother and the Vâlcea County prefect (1900). He married Ana Iancovescu in 1899, and had two daughters from her—Emma and Alice. From 1901 to 1903, he was a deputy prefect in Northern Dobruja, moving between Babadag, Sulina, Cataloi and Măcin. He was again in Vâlcea as a village inspector on the Lotru (1904), putting out the magazine Râmnicul (1906). Following the peasants' revolt of March 1907 and the cession of power to a National Liberal cabinet, he became for a while director of the Vâlcea prefecture. During this interval, he played host to an informal gathering of writers, including Victor Eftimiu, Octavian Goga, and Ilarie Chendi. According to Eftimiu, it was here that Chendi showed the first signs of a debilitating mental disease.

Theodorian returned to short-story writing with Prima durere, followed by Calea sufletului ("The Way of the Soul", 1909), then La masa calicului ("At the Cadger's Table", 1911), also debuting as a novelist with the 1908 Sângele Solovenilor ("Blood of the Soloveni"). His work took him to Buzău County, where he was a field inspector for agriculture (1908–1911), but he also returned to Bucharest where, in 1910, with Mariu and Ion I. C. Brătianu, he visited his uncle Eugeniu at his deathbed. He was by then involved with the Romanian Writers' Society (SSR), having joined its embryonic predecessor in 1908–1909, and becoming an executive committee member of the reorganized forum in November 1911, reelected in 1912 and 1914.

He was at that time a frequent guest of Casa Capșa restaurant, known to others as "the man with glass in his eye", for his habit of wearing monocles. As noted by literary historian George Călinescu, while lacking "a particular career", Theodorian maintained a "sumptuous" lifestyle; also: "beyond [his] outbursts of violence and a domineering nature, he was a sentimental character." The same is also argued by the dramatist Mircea Ștefănescu: "Caton Theodorian appeared to be aggressive to all those who did not know him well." This, however, was just a front, which allowed Theodorian to "defend his profession with staunchness and dignity." Visiting the Kingdom of Italy and the German Empire in 1912, Theodorian sent numerous postcards to the hospitalized Chendi. When Chendi committed suicide, he proposed erecting a bust in his likeness.

With other Society members, among them Goga, Emil Gârleanu, and Cincinat Pavelescu, he traveled into Austria-Hungary, attending literary parties for the Romanian community of Transylvania. Between 1910 and 1926, Theodorian was also a member in the reading committee at the National Theatre Bucharest. Although he reported in 1911 that he was working on a new novel, Față'n față ("Face to Face"), it never came out. As noted in 1974 by Capșa colleague I. Peltz, he "wrote little, but bragged about it to no end." He eventually returned with a tragedy, Ziua cea din urmă ("That Last Day"), hosted by Noua Revistă Română in 1912, and staged at Bucharest's Modern Theater by Marioara Voiculescu's company in 1913. In early 1914, following a dispute with the dramatist Dimitrie Anghel, the latter challenged him to a duel. When Theodorian refused to fight, Anghel published a letter calling him various names, including an "intriguer" and "ridiculous Oltenian knight".

Two more volumes of short prose also came out in 1914: Povestea unei odăi ("The History of a Room") and Cum plânge Zinica ("Watch Zinica Sobbing"). In his other contributions, he translated books by Théophile Gautier, Émile Zola, and Arnould Galopin. His adaptation of Romain Coolus' Une femme passa (as Trecu o femeie) was included by George Diamandy in the National Theater program of 1914; the next year, Alexandru Mavrodi did the same with Amicul Teddy, translated by Theodorian and V. Enescu from Rivoire–Besnard's Mon ami Teddy. Elected SSR vice president in January 1915, during Diamandy's mandate, Theodorian followed up with his own comedy, Bujoreștii. Viewed by several critics as his masterpiece and one of the best Romanian comedies, it was also described by Tudor Vianu as a rare break with the "Romantic formula" of Romanian theater. Bujoreștii was soon after taken up by the National Theater, then under Ion Peretz, and premiered with Constantin Radovici as lead. The play was also included in the Iași Theatre repertoire, where it was appreciated by the public, but panned by local critics.

=== World War I ===
During the first two years of war, with Romania maintaining a cautious neutrality, Mariu Theodorian became a major proponent of non-alignment, speaking out against supporters of both the Entente and the Central Powers. He had left the National Liberals during the municipal elections of 1914, rallying with the Conservative Party as a disciple of Alexandru Marghiloman and Titu Maiorescu, and therefore of its Junimea inner faction. Although not a "Germanophile", Mariu supported a Maiorescu neutralist cabinet, which, he argued, would have been able to gather political support from the Entente, but without going to war; he was also opposed to the Entente because it included the Russian Empire, accused of persecuting the Romanians of Bessarabia. An expert in canon law, he was noted as a critic of the Romanian Orthodox Church, having argued, as early as 1897, that "all true Christians will end up turning to Rome." By May 1908, under guidance from Vladimir Ghika, he had done so himself, being received into the Greek-Catholic community, and working to build a Greek-Catholic church in Bucharest.

Caton did not share his brother's worldview. He was in France as the war started, and had to take an unusually long trip back to Romania, through Italy, Greece, and the Turkish Straits. Recounting his adventure in Adevărul, he argued that the world was poised for an Entente victory. Privately, however, he was also in favor of neutralism. As argued by historian Lucian Boia, he was "hypochondriac and restless", especially alarmed by news of aerial bombardments. In July 1916, as the conflict of visions split the SSR into factions, Theodorian resigned his position on the committee. He politely declined when asked by the prestigious novelist Duiliu Zamfirescu to return and ensure "continuity"; later, he resigned from the syndicate altogether. He ran for reelection at the reading committee, against George Ranetti. Ranetti claimed that, although he lost, Theodorian was still appointed, being favored by Education Minister Ion G. Duca.

Eventually, in August, King Ferdinand I opted to declare war on the Central Powers. After briefly going on the offensive the Romanian Land Forces had to deal with a counterattack, eventually leading to the occupation of Craiova. According to Mariu, the family's book collection was ransacked by the Germans. For a while, Caton took refuge at Valea Mare, in Muscel County, where he reunited with his brother Mariu and many others who believed that resistance would be organized there. When this failed to happen, they both sought a safer haven at Câmpulung.

Caton awaited the arrival of the German Army, confident that the Germans were chivalrous enemies. He fled again, just before the area was engulfed. By November 1916 he was in Iași, Western Moldavia; a month later, he began a long journey to Paris, arriving there in 1917. In the French capital, he reunited with his writer friend Eftimiu, as another member of the isolated Romanian cell. In his 1965 recollections, Eftimiu claims that, while he had trouble making ends meet, Theodorian "knew how to take care of himself, though not by hard work, nor by mental concentration." According to Theodorian, however, his was "no easy life". By 1918, living in the Latin Quarter with his family, he was working as a typist for the agency recording prisoners of war, and also making shells in a factory. Other sources indicate that he was also the press agent for the Romanian military attaché in France. He proposed to Eftimiu that they work together on a screenplay about the legendary Romanian ancestors of Pierre de Ronsard. The project was aborted when Eftimiu discovered that the necessitous Gaumont would not even hire him as an extra.

In the meantime, the fall of Bucharest had left Romania divided: King Ferdinand, his government, and the army proceeded to Western Moldavia, where they continued resistance; in the Wallachian south, Conservative Lupu Kostaki and his allies tolerated, or collaborated with, the German occupation. Mariu was one of Kostaki's associates, and, in January 1918, was appointed secretary of the Wallachian Bishopric, an Orthodox institution. His Catholicism having been revealed to the public, he was forced two resign a few days into his office. A few weeks after, Marghiloman was called upon to form a cabinet and negotiate a peace with the Central Powers (which was signed in May 1918). Mariu believed that Marghiloman was a godsend for Romania: "he managed to defend the dynasty and protect the army from being disarmed". He ran in the 1918 election, taking a seat in Senate for Ilfov County, and resuming his work for the unification of churches. His major effort was in supporting the Romanians of Northern Dobruja, which Romania had effectively ceded to Greater Bulgaria. Mariu Theodorian suggested that Orthodox Romanians, forcefully integrated into Bulgarian Orthodoxy, protect themselves by mass-converting to Catholicism.

Mariu remained in office under the emergency cabinet of Constantin Coandă, during which time Romania gravitated back toward the Entente camp: an interlude of "anarchy", as he himself put it. Caton rushed out of Paris in February or March 1918, when the Germans dropped incendiary bombs on that city, and took his family to Switzerland. By August, he was living in Lausanne, and taking a political course similar to Mariu's. As he explained in letters addressed to Liviu Rebreanu, he resented the "cheeky" Romanian Ententists who had escaped to France, advocating a purge of those who had "pushed us into a crazy war". Unable to make ends meet in Lausanne, he and his family moved to Bern, where they were assisted by the Romanian Red Cross.

=== Return and later life ===
The unexpected fall of Germany was registered as a triumph for the Ententists. Mariu, entering Marghiloman's Progressive Conservative Party, contested the November 1919 election and lost his Senate seat. Caton and his family left Switzerland with a Yugoslav sanitary train, stopping in Zemun, then crossing over to Craiova. He returned to Bucharest before or during April 1919, when he took part in the founding of Sburătorul, a modernist magazine and literary circle. He then had his new play, Comedia inimei ("Heart's Comedy"), performed at the National Theater. It was booed on its premiere, then quickly "buried". Theodorian then resumed his activity as a translator, with a version of L'affaire Clémenceau, by Alexandre Dumas, fils, coming out in 1921. He put out the prose volume Epice și dramatice ("Things Epic and Dramatic", 1921), and two other new plays: Nevestele domnului Pleșu ("Mr. Pleșu's Wives"), and Stăpâna ("Mistress", first performed in 1919, published 1936). With Eftimiu and Mavrodi as managers of the National Theater, the latter were performed as part of the mandatory quota of "original plays" during the early 1920s. At the time, his family suffered a loss. Nonu Theodorian, who was ill with tuberculosis from about 1919, died in 1922. Under the pen name "Jean d'Orient", he had followed his brother's career choices, publishing several art chronicles in L'Indépendance Roumaine.

In the new Greater Romania, Caton was a member of the arts directorate committee within the Arts Ministry in 1923, appointed inspector-general of the theaters some four years later. As such, in 1929 he investigated the conflict between the National Theater and actress Maria Giurgea, who alleged unlawful termination of contract. In parallel, he became a founding member of the Society of Romanian Dramatic Authors (SADR). Created solely by Theodorian's efforts, it fulfilled his dream to give dramatists more social standing, and, on his initiative, offered special prizes specifically for Romanian-themed comedies. These went to Anton Holban, Ion Marin Sadoveanu, and George Mihail Zamfirescu. He served as SADR president in 1923–1926, and again in 1933–1939, being seconded by Ion Al. Vasilescu-Valjean, Mihail Sorbul, and Rebreanu (with Paul Gusty as treasurer and Victor Ion Popa as secretary). He represented the body as a speaker at the funerals of Garabet Ibrăileanu, Petre I. Sturdza, and Eugeniu Botez. He also attended congresses of the International Confederation of Societies of Authors and Composers, promoting Romanian works for an international audience, and playing host to Coolus when the latter visited Bucharest in November 1934. His Bujoreștii was translated into Italian by Venere Isopescu, and published in Lanciano by Casa editrice Rocco Carabba.

His penultimate published work was Greșeala lui Dumnezeu ("God's Mistake"), taken up by the National Theater in 1926, issued as a book in 1929, and turned into a radio play by Radio Prague in 1939. Jucării sfărâmate ("Broken Toys"), which came out in 1927, unusually premiered at Chișinău National Theatre, Bessarabia, Theodorian having decided he preferred this over the Bucharest equivalent (the latter only staged it in 1936). His attention later switched to his native city and his family history. In 1937, he edited for print his father's letters, relating to the 1870 riots, and, in September 1938, donated his collection, comprising 284 volumes, autographs, and a portrait of his father, to the Alexandru and Aristia Aman Foundation in Craiova. By then, his SADR project had crumbled, lacking sufficient funds and being torn by disputes between its members. Although pensioned by the Arts Ministry, during his last months Theodorian cooperated with the National Renaissance Front dictatorship. From March 1938, alongside Ioan Alexandru Brătescu-Voinești, Emanoil Bucuța, Maria Filotti and Constantin Kirițescu, he led the General Directorate of the Press and Propaganda, which dealt with both promoting regime literature and censoring out its critics.

He left fragments of plays, titled Obsesia ("Obsession"), Micobul ("The Microbe"), and Numărul de telefon ("A Telephone Number"); a one-act comedy in manuscript, titled Autorul ("The Author"); and a sketch for the novel Să vrei să iubești ("The Will to Love"). He was survived by his daughter Alice, who was pursuing an on-off affair with the novelist Mihail Sebastian, and by his brother Mariu. In December 1939, the latter was requesting a pension from the SSR. As claimed by a friend, the bishop Ioan Bălan, his father's estate had been "eaten away" by his other three siblings, and he was reduced to living on what remained from his adoptive mother.

== Literary work ==
=== Prose ===
During his Petale and Prima durere years, Theodorian borrowed inspiration from his Craiova colleague, Traian Demetrescu, producing novellas about aggrieved figures—pious prostitutes, marginalized officers, altruistic girls. According to his Sburătorul patron Eugen Lovinescu, the bulk of his short prose resembles Brătescu-Voinești and I. A. Bassarabescu: urban-themed but longing for the "patriarchal" environment of the countryside, this "quite uniform" literature is "rather better in its miniature portrayals [of] aged maniacs and most of all survivors from a bygone era". Călinescu suggests that Theodorian's sketches were "amateurish", and the humorous ones "very weak". He reserved some praise for the more "dramatic" ones, such as Calea sufletului, in which the protagonist, an Orthodox priest, confronts the notary and a band of robbers to protect his charity box. Reviewing the latter, Izabela Sadoveanu described Theodorian's "absence of taste and common sense, [which] makes him slide into sentimental exaggeration, into fake, affected, romanticism". Calea sufletului, she argues, is an "anecdote that, had it been recounted concisely, vigorously, would have been interesting enough with its sheer chain of events." Contrarily, Nicolae Iorga of Sămănătorul found the works illuminating, with Theodorian as "master of the smooth and solid form", including "one of the best stories ever written in Romanian."

Summarized by George Călinescu as "literature opposing boyars to the upstarts", its more lively elements, according to Lovinescu, are its recurring samples of Theodorian's native Oltenian dialect. Thus, the ideologically-tinged Sângele Solovenilor was, according to Lovinescu, a mixture of Sămănătorul traditionalism (though "not one of attitudes") and Junimea conservatism. Călinescu rates it, more precisely, as "naturalistic", "in that variety of Romanian naturalism which deals with matters of heredity." Iorga, who notes the same affiliation, suggests that the work is disappointing, but also that it features "many well-contoured characters." At core, the psychological novel is about a clash of identities, between the legitimate and illegitimate sons of boyar Isaie Murat, ending in tragic suicide. Heredity is also the background theme in Povestea unei odăi, where Lady Zinca tries her best to fend off destiny, keeping her grandson uninformed about his father's gambling addiction.

=== Drama ===
Novelist Léon Thévenin argued that Theodorian's contribution in theater made him a Romanian Eugène Brieux, albeit one writing for art's sake. Bujoreștii, presenting a dramatic version of Theodorian's stories, was a direct inspiration for the interwar theater of various authors (including Camil Petrescu and Lucreția Petrescu). It centers on the aging epicurean Fotin Bujorescu, depicted in tandem with the affable pharmacist, Amos. The latter is, according to Lovinescu, inspired by Ludwig Fulda's "Blockhead", but "more nuanced and of more depth". Călinescu notes that, beyond superficial similarities with the plays of Émile Augier, Bujoreștii is original in depicting Fotin, a boyar, consumed not by thoughts of his mortality and his lineage dying out, but by the notion of eternity adapted to the Romanian psyche: he desperately wants his name to live on, not necessarily his aristocratic genes. For this reason, he wants Amos, whom he believes to be a distant relative, as his son-in-law, shunning the commoner Cărbuneanu, although Cărbuneanu has impregnated his daughter Olga. Amos accepts the deal, and only because he genuinely loves his betrothed.

On its 1921 premiere in Iași, Bujoreștii was noted by critic D. Razu for its richness of detail, with "every scene [...] a tiny work of drama"; a disadvantage of this was a certain slowness of action, which left actors with fewer lines simply "caged" on the stage. Razu, who noted that both the actors and the public were enjoying the play, suggested that this was mostly because of its sexualized double entendres, concluding: "We're told that Mr Caton Teodorian [sic] [...] wrote his Bujoreștii to poke fun at his public. In this, he succeeded fully." In its second act, this "chronologically imprecise" comedy depicts an awkward confrontation between Fotin and a circle of modernist youths. This atemporality, as well as its penchant for "written, not spoken" language, are described by Lovinescu as Theodorian's chief mistakes. He notes that such defects were constant, but even more noticeable, in all of Theodorian's writings for the stage.

Written on the same structure as Bujoreștii, these works often touch on romantic subjects, particularly so Comedia inimii—in which Amos makes his return; and Greșeala lui Dumnezeu—in which the architect Scutaru is present to fill in the same mediating role. As Călinescu records, Comedia inimii, like Ziua cea din urmă (about an accidental fratricide), is "banal and falsely poetic." The former was partly defended by Liviu Rebreanu, who suggested that the work erred in being "exceedingly perfect as literature", but not workable as drama. He suggested publishing it as a book, and rehashing it in a shortened version for the stage.

Fulda's influence was also detected in Nevestele domnului Pleșu. As Lovinescu notes, this work is less of a drama and more of a farce, but also shows a will for human betterment, personified by the clerk Hristache, triumphant over evil—represented here by the exploitative Stolnici. Călinescu rates the work as a "puerile, substantially vulgar" comedy. Similarly, in Stăpâna, Tecla Breazu cheats on her husband, bailiff Stoica, "on account that she cannot change the boyar blood in her." Meanwhile, the kind and tenacious Stroica fights off the absurd wishes of his father-in-law—the play ends with a marriage of love between his daughter and another commoner. Theodorian's final contribution, Jucării sfărâmate, shows a middle-aged man falling for a much younger woman, who only loves him as a father-figure. The result, Călinescu writes, is a "downright awful comedy" (although, according to Perpessicius, the play was "not done justice").
