= Raicu Ionescu-Rion =

Romanian writer (1872–1895)

Raicu Ionescu-Rion (born Raicu Ionescu; August 24, 1872 – April 19, 1895) was a Romanian literary critic and socialist commentator.

Born in Bălăbănești, Galați County, he came from a poor peasant family. He attended primary school in Tăcuta village (1879–1882), the Codreanu High School in Bârlad (1882–1889), and the faculty of literature and philosophy at the University of Iași (1890–1893), meanwhile taking classes on a scholarship at the higher normal school. While in high school in 1887, together with Garabet Ibrăileanu, N. Savin, D. Moscu, and T. Cardaș, he founded the socialist Oriental literary society. During this period, he undertook a systematic reading of Pierre-Joseph Proudhon, Karl Marx, Friedrich Engels, Max Nordau, Charles Darwin, and Herbert Spencer, as well as of Hippolyte Taine and Georg Brandes. His published debut came in 1889 with the article "Împrejurări ușurătoare", published in the Roman Școala nouă, an outfit headed by P. Mușoiu and E. Vaian, and where Ibrăileanu was chief editor. He contributed social criticism and theoretical articles to the socialist newspapers Critica socială and Munca, as well as to Evenimentul (also edited by Ibrăileanu). The majority of his literary studies appeared in Evenimentul literar. He worked as a substitute teacher in Târgoviște (1893-1895), where he died of consumption. He used the pen names Rion, V. Rion, Noir, Th. Bulgarul, Faust, Paul Fortună, and G. Mirea. His close friends Ibrăileanu and Sofia Nădejde published a posthumous collection of his criticism as Scrieri literare (1895). In his work, Ionescu-Rion showed himself to be a follower and admirer of Constantin Dobrogeanu-Gherea, also displaying a close affinity with Ibrăileanu.
