= Emil Fagure =

Romanian prose writer, translator, journalist and theatre and music critic

Emil D. Fagure (born Samuel Honigman; April 7, 1873 – March 16, 1948) was a Romanian prose writer, translator, journalist and theatre and music critic.

== Life ==
Born into a Jewish family in Iași, his father was a cantor and piano teacher; his brother Albert would become a socialist journalist. From a young age, he had a solid musical education, and attended the National College. He graduated from the law faculty of the University of Bucharest, beginning a career in journalism as an editor for Munca and then Lumea nouă. He subsequently edited Adevărul, where, between 1895 and 1921, he reached the positions of editing secretary and later editor-in-chief, and was also chief editor of the supplement Adevărul literar și artistic from 1920 to 1921. At Paris between 1918 and 1919, contributing to several French periodicals, he formed part of the editing committee for La Roumanie weekly, advocating for closer ties between France and Romania. For his activity, he received a decoration from his native country, as well as the Legion of Honour.

Constantin Mille established Lupta newspaper in 1921, and he and Fagure, as well as Barbu Brănișteanu, would serve as directors until 1937, when it was suppressed. In this position, he advocated for the National Peasants' Party, which helped secure his entry into the Assembly of Deputies in 1929. He later became a Senator. Fagure and Mille also ran Presa from 1921 to 1923. Various prose fiction and reportages of his appeared in Evenimentul literar, where he served as editing secretary and signed as M. Dobrin, in the Iași Evenimentul and in the Bucharest Pagini literare, Teatrul, Dimineața and Rampa. In the legal field, he published juridical treatises and studies as F. Emilian.

Writing lead articles, reportages, investigations, interviews, columns such as Note, Păreri și impresii and Fapte și observații (sometimes signed E.D.F.), Fagure identified and commented on the events and happenings of his time. He attempted to impose respect for social justice, criticizing the ills brought on by poor governance (in particular that of the National Liberal Party) and supporting various causes, including the entry of Romania into World War I on the side of the Allies and opposition to the ascendancy of the extreme right and Romania's increasing domination by the interests of Nazi Germany, which led him to leave the country between 1938 and 1945.

== Theatrical criticism ==
As a theatre commentator, he began at Evenimentul in 1890, becoming Adevărul's official columnist in 1896. Launching a four-decade run as a critic, he announced himself as "a free spirit, ready to applaud art", and was driven by a passion for the stage made apparent through his involvement in the theatre. His commentaries were grounded in general ideas such as the relationship between theatre and society, based on which a repertoire should be constructed. He advocated for balancing between the need to improve spectators' minds and that of attracting them, which in practice meant alternating between serious, intrinsically valuable plays and lighthearted, entertaining fare. He also pressed for the gradual introduction of modern plays, so as to get viewers used to new theatrical norms. However, he strongly opposed a haphazard importation of plays and attempted to persuade managers to promote domestic works. He had an ample theoretical knowledge of the theatre, writing about the directions taken by the European stage and attempting to integrate the plays he reviewed into their aesthetic or ideological current.

After passing judgment on the dramatic structure of a text as a whole, he evaluated its verisimilitude, the suitability of its subject, the intent and moral quality and the degree to which events and characters are motivated by the text's interior logic. He proceeded to a scene-by-scene analysis of the action, digressing into considerations of human existence and social and family relations, revealing meanings, nuances and psychological subtleties. When evaluating the quality of acting, he discussed the suitability of the cast and the need to account both for the actor's natural attributes and the role's fundamental character.

The reviews reveal his excitement for the stage, narrating with relish the details of memorable performances, whether of plays in their entirety or of particular actors who stirred his enthusiasm. Commentators have noted that his competent and fair verdicts as well as his erudition, which he used to promote certain values, played their part in influencing the theatre of his day. He was also a keen observer of musical concerts, about which he wrote in the Teatru-Muzică column and which he had attended with interest since childhood. Moreover, he founded the Association of Dramatic and Musical Critics, of which he served as the first president, and established a prize for young playwrights whose work had not yet been staged.

== Published work ==
His only prose book, the 1905 Schițe. 30 de zile la Paris, mixes short romantic tales with travel notes. One section collects the articles he had sent home from Paris: opinions, descriptions, commentaries on various aspects of the city's artistic and social life. In these as well as subsequent travel accounts, he emerges as a spirited and humorous observer impressed by natural scenes.

He acted as a supplier of texts for Bucharest stages, from summer gardens to the National Theatre. These included light French shows, vaudeville acts that would receive resonant titles such as Vasilache Astronomu, Madame Ordonanță, Mitică Ghinion, Lilica Ponpon, Nunta lui Țopârdea, Divorțul din Puțul cu Plopi and Mache Somnambulul and which were staged during the 1900s. He also brought more serious plays by Paul Siraudin, Franz von Schönthan and Gustav Kadelburg. He published numerous works, some of them in book form, including Christian Friedrich Hebbel's Judith, Hermann Sudermann's Stone Among Stones and Paul Hervieu's La Course du flambeau. Others were merely performed: Maria Magdalena by Hebbel, L'Enfant du miracle by Paul Gavault and Robert Charvay, Jack Straw by W. Somerset Maugham, the libretto of Franz Lehár's Eva, and works by Alfred Capus and Bernhard Buchbinder.
