= Joseph Brociner =

Romanian Jewish jurist, activist, communal leader (1846 – 1918)

Joseph B. Brociner
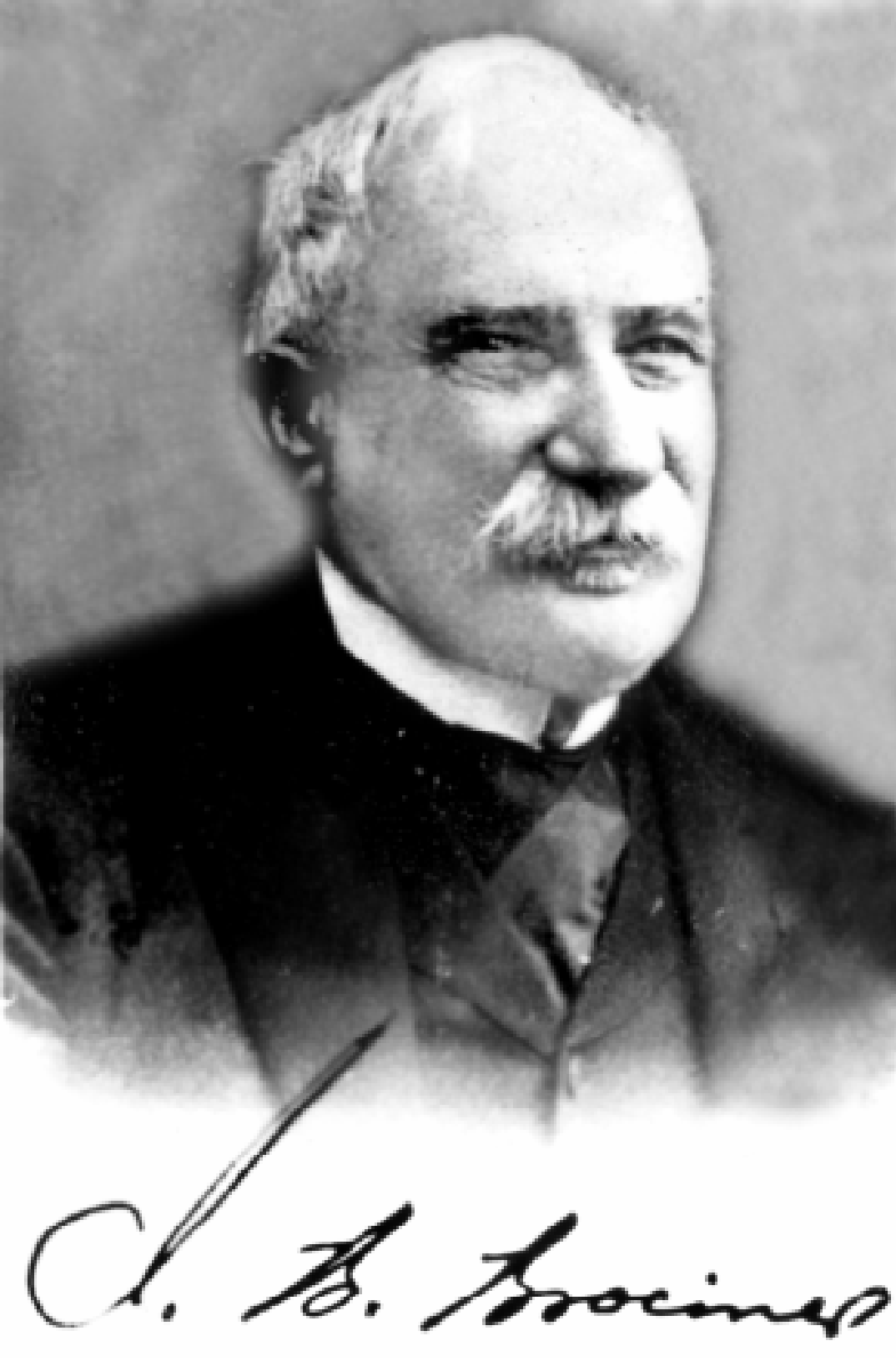

Personal life
- Born: October 1846 Iași, Principality of Moldavia
- Died: 1918 (aged 71–72)

Religious life
- Religion: Judaism

Joseph B. Brociner (Hebrew: יוֹסֵף בּ. בְּרוֹצִ׳ינֶר; October 1846 – 1918) was a Romanian Jewish jurist, activist, communal leader. He was active in the struggle for Jewish emancipation as President of the Union of Hebrew Congregations of Romania.

== Biography ==
=== Early life ===
Joseph Brociner was born in October 1846 to Idel Ber Brociner, the grandson of Talmudist Abraham David Wahrman. From 1864 to 1866, Brociner studied law at the University of Iași, and during that time helped found the Uniunii israelite, a Jewish defensive publication society.

In 1867 Brociner settled at Galați as a merchant. He joined (1868) the Galați Lodge of the Grand Orient de France Masonic Order, and as a Freemason was active in bringing about a modification of rituals, finally obtaining for himself the thirty-third degree. At the time, he was the only Jew among the Freemasons of the Grand Orient to attain this degree.

=== Career ===
In 1873 Brociner was chosen president of the local committee of the Alliance Israélite Universelle. Together with Leopold Stern of Bucharest, he was delegated in 1876 to represent Rumania at the conference of the Alliance Israélite Universelle for the defense of Jews in the Orient, held under the chairmanship of Adolphe Crémieux at Paris. During the Russo-Turkish War of 1877, Brociner was secretary of the committee for maintaining ambulances on the battlefield; and in April and May 1878, he accompanied Adolph Stern to Budapest, Vienna, and Berlin to obtain the co-operation of their coreligionists in championing the cause of the Romanian Jews at the Congress of Berlin. In June he was a member of the commission sent to Berlin to furnish the congress of the European powers with information on the Romanian question. In August 1878, along with Benjamin F. Peixotto, American consul-general at Lyons, he represented the Romanian Jews at the second conference of the Alliance Israélite Universelle, held at Paris.

Brociner accompanied his brother, Marco Brociner (another brother, Maurice, was secretary to King Charles of Romania), to Vienna, Berlin, and Paris (1879), in order to further the interests of the Romanian Jews in these cities. He was president of the Jewish community of Galați in 1874, 1878, 1884, and 1893. In 1884 he was vice-president of the Galați committee for establishing Jewish settlements in Palestine which were afterward taken under the protection of Baron Edmond de Rothschild of Paris.

The Union of Romanian Jewish Congregations was due to Brociner's initiative, and in recognition of his services he was unanimously elected first president. In addition to many articles on the Jewish question, and various reports published by the B'nai B'rith Lodge, Brociner wrote a pamphlet entitled Law of Moadim (Days of Meeting).
