= Constantin Dobrogeanu-Gherea =

Romanian academic, writer and politician (1855–1920)

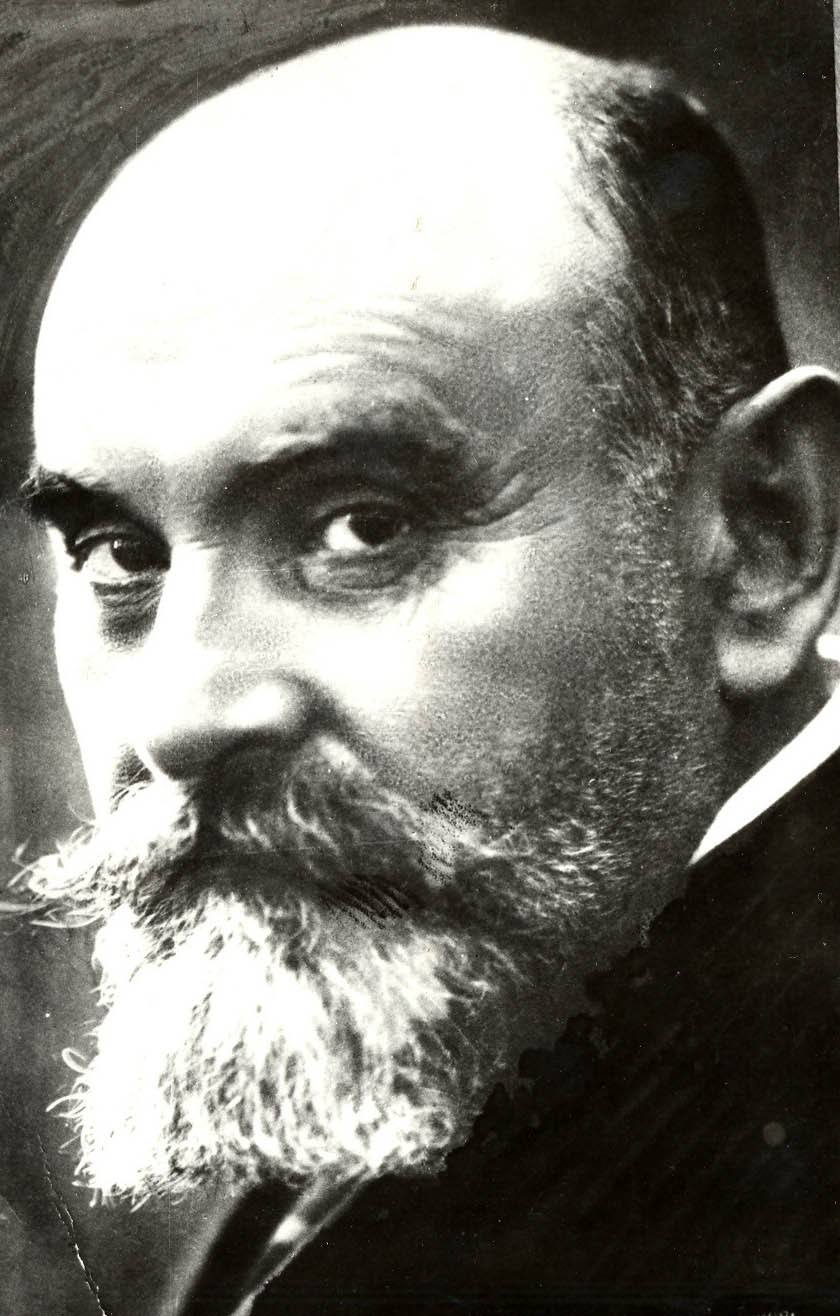
Constantin Dobrogeanu-Gherea

Constantin Dobrogeanu-Gherea (born Solomon Katz; 21 May 1855 – 7 May 1920) was a Romanian Marxist theorist, politician, sociologist, literary critic, and journalist. He was also an entrepreneur in the city of Ploiești. Constantin Dobrogeanu-Gherea was the father of communist activist Alexandru Dobrogeanu-Gherea and of philosopher Ionel Gherea.

== Biography ==
Dobrogeanu-Gherea was born on 21 May 1855 in the village of Slavyanka near Yekaterinoslav (modern Dnipro), then in Yekaterinoslav Governorate of the Russian Empire, to the Ukrainian Jewish Katz family. After studies at Kharkiv University (where he engaged in revolutionary politics), Dobrogeanu-Gherea fled persecution by the Okhrana and settled in Iași (1875). He was active in socialist politics, giving shape to the first centers of activism in Romania, and contributed to left-wing magazines such as Contemporanul.

The group centered on Dobrogeanu-Gherea became the most preeminent one to form the Romanian Social-Democratic Workers' Party. While the idea did exist before Dobrogeanu-Gherea, opposed Narodist thought and anarchists within Romania, which was to have a crucial contribution to the emergence of Poporanism (although his group and the Poporanists became political adversaries after the latter joined the National Liberal Party and began using antisemitic slogans).

== Literary criticism ==
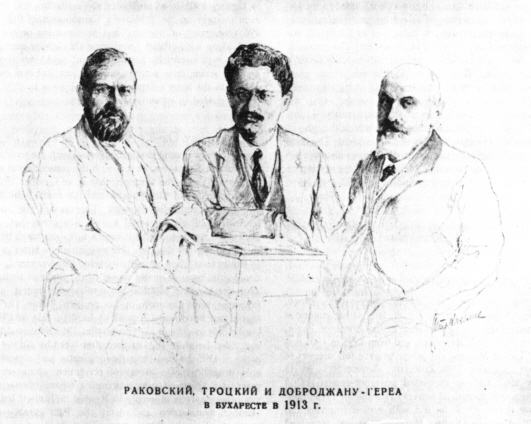
From left to right: Christian Rakovsky, Leon Trotsky, and Dobrogeanu-Gherea, during a meeting in Bucharest (1913 drawing)

Constantin Dobrogeanu-Gherea amended the aesthetical guidelines of Junimea and its most important voice, Titu Maiorescu. To the Junimea vision of art for art's sake, created through the merger of moment and authentic feeling, he added conditioning through social necessities (art with tendency). Maiorescu had been a critic of forms without substance (i. e.: cultural institutions that did not blend into, nor borrow from, society), but he had shown himself skeptical to the notion that art could ever be directed to serve a political purpose (especially if that purpose was socialism, which he rejected as a viable option).

He wrote extensive studies on literary figures, and engaged in vivid polemics with many of his contemporaries. Dobrogeanu-Gherea had a lifelong friendship with Ion Luca Caragiale, giving an interpretation of his works through parallels established with writers of his generation in other cultures. For example, he compared Caragiale's short story An Easter Torch, a reflection on the brutal outcome of antisemitism, with writings by Fyodor Dostoevsky. The two exchanged letters for a large part of their lives: while never a socialist, Caragiale admired Dobrogenu-Gherea's attitudes and used his critique of Romanian society in the writing of his work 1907. From Spring to Autumn (expressing his beliefs about the causes and outcome of the 1907 peasants' revolt).

== Sociology ==
Alongside small-scale works on dialectical materialism, Dobrogeanu-Gherea published his most debated volume, the 1910 Neoiobăgia (Studiu economico-sociologic al problemei noastre agrare) ["Neo-Serfdom (A Social and Economical Study of Our Land Issue)"]. The work argued that Romania was trapped in feudalism, with the minimum of capitalist vehicles present only to ensure an easier exploitation of the peasantry by the social élite. According to Dobrogenu-Gherea, the land reform carried out under Alexandru Ioan Cuza (in 1864) had only procrastinated a dramatic outcome.

In 1915, Leon Trotsky, citing Dobrogeanu-Gherea alongside Christian Rakovsky as a major figure of socialism in Romania, commented on Neo-Serfdom's conclusions:

"All the contradictions of the social and political life of Rumania: the bondage of the peasants, judicially repealed but resurrected by the logic of economic relations; the parliamentary regime set up on the basis of Asiatic agrarianism; "British" freedoms in the cities, the old style Turkish despotism in the countryside — all these phenomena are subjected in Gherea’s great book to a truly masterly analysis where clarity and simplicity go hand in hand with a genuine Marxist profundity."

== Legacy ==
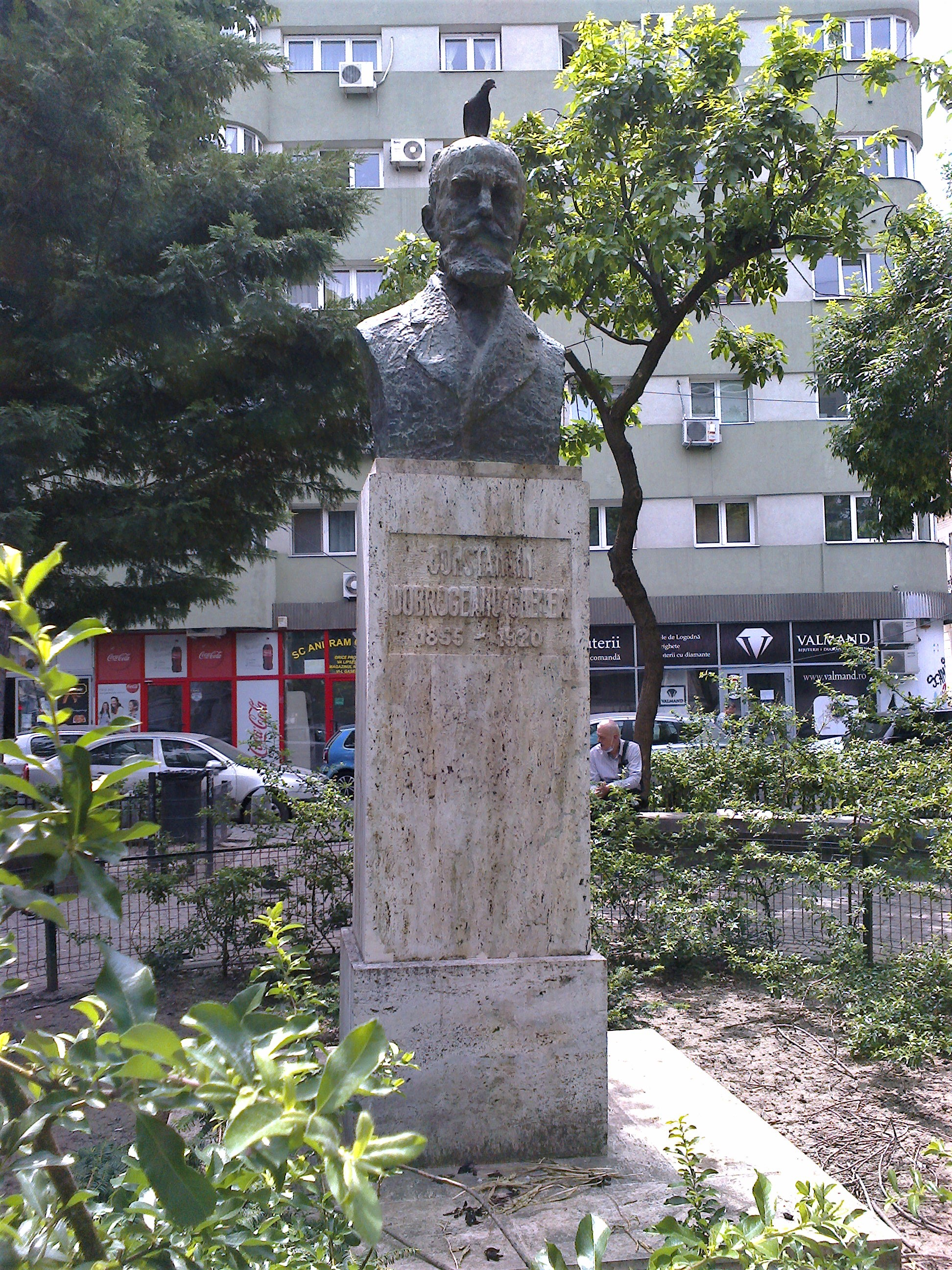
Statue of Dobrogeanu-Gherea in Bucharest

Dobrogeanu-Gherea died in Bucharest on 7 May 1920. His works were adopted by the Romanian Communist Party. However, few of Dobrogeanu-Gherea's writings could be said to advocate political revolution, and all of them fit in the patterns of reformism.

In 1948, he was posthumously made a member of the Romanian Academy.
