= George Ranetti =

Romanian poet, journalist and playwright (1975–1928)

George Ranetti (Gheorghe Ranetti, G. Ranetty)
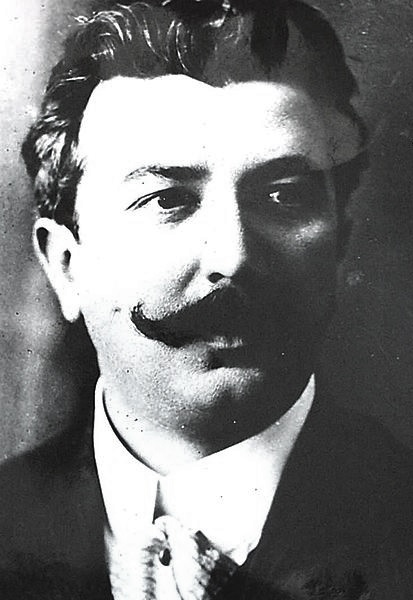
- Born: George (or Gheorghe) Ranete; October 1875; Mizil, Kingdom of Romania
- Died: May 25, 1928 (aged 52); Bucharest, Kingdom of Romania
- Occupations: Journalist, translator, politician, civil servant
- Writing career
- Pen name: George Biciușcă, Caiafa, Coco, Contele de Techirghiol, Cyr, Cyrano, Geo, Ghiță Delagambrinus, Don Ghițos Delagambrinos y Mizilos, Ghiță Delamizil, Jorj Delamizil, Ghiță Delacoperativă, (Prințul, Tovarășul) Ghiță, Lord Ghytza, Marchizul de Kogealac, Nagor, Namuna, Kiriac N'a pas d'argent, Kiriac Napadarjan, Netty, Ghiță Nifilistul, Dom Paladu, Peneș, Putifar, V. V. Rița, Rolla, Romeo, Șan, Șander, Șandernagor, Sarsailă, Spiriduș, Tarascon, Tarasconată
- Period: c. 1890–1928
- Genres: Comedy of manners, fable, sketch story, epigram, satire, parody, verse comedy, revue, sonnet, reportage, theater criticism, gossip column, investigative journalism
- Movement: Poporanism

George or Gheorghe Ranetti, born George Ranete (October 1875 – May 25, 1928), was a Romanian poet, journalist and playwright, known as the founder and editor of Furnica magazine. A professional journalist from the late 1890s, he alternated between political dailies and literary reviews, being sympathetic to Romanian nationalism and traditionalism, and working under Ion Luca Caragiale at Moftul Român. By 1904–1906, he was active on the margin of left-wing traditionalism, or Poporanism, showing himself sympathetic to republican or generically anti-elitist ideologies. Such views and influences seeped into his activity at Furnica, which was for decades a prominent institution in Romanian humor.

Ranetti's literature, redolent of Caragiale and Anton Bacalbașa, was mostly ephemeral in nature, and often referenced the politics of his native Mizil. His articles, fables, sketch stories and plays, with their critique of Francization and affectation, earned him a following in the general public, but were regarded by critics and scholars as dated, overreaching, or overall inferior to the Caragiale model. His satire often had very precise targets, including King Carol I and his courtier Ioan Kalinderu, politician George D. Pallade, and actor Ion Brezeanu. In addition to putting out original texts, Ranetti was a noted translator and dramaturge, who adapted works by Georges Courteline and Paul Gavault.

Nationalism also influenced Ranetti's politics, including his vocal support for the Entente Powers during World War I. That period saw him engaged in polemics with colleagues Emil Fagure and A. de Herz, and contributing to nationalist propaganda as co-editor of România newspaper. His postwar years, marked by his split from, then return to, Furnica, were spent writing parody novels and collecting his scattered poetry. By the time of his death, he was an editor and writer for Universul daily.

== Biography ==
=== Early life and debut ===
George Ranetti-Ranete was born in 1875, either on October 10 or October 18, in Mizil town, Prahova County. The son of Vasile Ranetti (or Ranete) and Lina Ioachimescu, he had a younger brother, Atanase Ranetti-Picolo (born March 1878), who also pursued a career in the press. The family, despite being assumed Greek, was in fact Romanian. According to Ranetti, his ancestors were peasants. However, genealogical studies have confirmed his belonging to the local aristocracy. His ancestors may have included the boyar Hranete, or more certainly a Ranete sin Dimitrie Căpitanu, ennobled in Wallachia c. 1819. His paternal grandfather had lost his boyar status and worked as a trader in Fefelei, outside Mizil; Ranetti's father, Vasile, was a lawyer in town, who briefly served as Deputy Mayor in a Conservative-Party administration.

After school in Mizil, George went to Saints Peter and Paul Lyceum in Ploiești. Using the pen name Rolla, he published his first article, a defense of his father's politics, in the local paper Gazeta Buzăului (c. 1890); he made sure that his first poems, motivated by unrequited love and "ridiculously naive", were never published. Even before graduation, he began working as a telegraphist for the Ploiești branch of the Romanian Post. After getting his baccalaureate, he was for a while a student of law at the University of Bucharest. From about 1894, he became a contributor to Adevărul daily, under the assumed name of Namuna. His jokes and his first published translation, from Edmond Haraucourt, were screened by the editor, Anton "Tony" Bacalbașa—whom Ranetti saw as "my literary godfather". Also as Namuna, he joined Ion Ionescu-Quintus in translating August Strindberg's Father (1895).

Some of his earliest work saw print in traditionalist magazines: Vatra and Pagini Literare, c. 1894, Povestea Vorbei, from March 1897, and Floare Albastră, c. 1898. He alternated these contributions with pieces that appeared in the provincial press of Iași, including, in 1896, the daily Sara (as Șandernagor) and, in 1897, the socialist Noutatea. In September of that year, he was present at the students' national congress. Alongside Panait Zosin, he endorsed a minority view, which was that Romanian Jews should be allowed to join student bodies. Ranetti himself never graduated university. Though feeling encouraged enough to start writing professionally, he remained in Bucharest as a postal employee. By 1898, he was working as an editor of Nicolae Fleva's Dreptatea, and living on Rosetti Street, outside Cișmigiu, when his house was robbed by an unknown assailant. Also in 1898, he and Tony wrote for the left-leaning satirical newspaper Ardeiul, put out in Târgu Jiu by Witold Rolla-Piekarski, then for Tony's own Moș Teacă. His many engagements prevented him from finishing work on a translation of Cyrano de Bergerac, as commissioned by the National Theater Bucharest. He brought in Duțescu Duțu and Vasile Leonescu to complete that project.

Ranete-Ranetti made national news in October 1898, after historian Grigore Tocilescu had described him as "a kike and a socialist" (the young author was amused, indicating that he was neither). Using the pen name Tarascon, Ranetti published his first volume of humorous verse, Dom Paladu, in 1899. It went to three more editions by 1902. He was in parallel a reporter for Epoca (where his brother also took a salary) and Lupta, where he published his first epigrams. Ranetti also continued Bacalbașa's work by bringing back Moș Teacă in 1899, signing his articles there as G. Ranetty, Nagor, Rolla, Romeo, Șan, Șander, Șandernagor, Tarascon, Tarasconată, Ghiță, or Jorj Delamizil (roughly: "Georgy of Mizil"). In this new edition, Moș Teacă was putting out pieces deriding Christianity, for instance depicting the Annunciation as an act of adultery. This activity sparked a national controversy, with România Jună asking that Moș Teacă be banned and its publisher investigated.

By then, the more famous comedic writer Ion Luca Caragiale had declared himself entertained by Ranetti's "delicious" poetry. The two authors met regularly in Vadu Săpat, in the family home of Leonida Condeescu, who was serving as Mizil's mayor in 1895. Together, they helped publish Ciurda Literară, a satirical paper established in Mizil by Șerban Grigorescu. Employed by Caragiale, Ranetti worked for a while as editor of the satirical magazine Moftul Român, in its second edition; he was also a guest speaker at Caragiale's banquet, marking his silver jubilee in literature, in February 1901. He continued to publish standalone booklets and volumes, either as himself or under the pen name Cyrano: Strofe și apostrofe ("Stanzas and Apostrophes", 1900), Ahturi și ofuri ("Aahs and Oohs", 1901), Eu rîd, tu rîzi, el rîde ("I Laugh, You Laugh, He Laughs", 1903). In its original edition, Ahturi și ofuri carried a preface by Ranetti's colleague and mentor, the recently deceased Tony. From 1901 to 1904, Ranetti edited the satirical paper Zeflemeaua ("Badinage"), for which he used Cyrano, Jorj Delamizil, and a set of other pen names—Cyr, Ghiță, Ghiță Delacoperativă, Peneș, Putifar, V. V. Rița, and Kiriac Napadarjan (or N'a pas d'argent). The paper also delved in investigative journalism, and its stated mission was to expose cases of corruption. Its editorial office published another one of Ranetti's books, presented as Dom Paladu's letters from Italy (Scrisori din Italia).

=== Furnica and Poporanism ===
With Caragiale's departure for Berlin in 1904, Ranetti began feeling alone on the Romanian scene. In epigrams he wrote at the time, he pleaded with Caragiale to return, and chided D. Teleor for attempting to revive Moftul Român without its leading talent. Those years brought his involvement as a dramaturge of the National Theater, one of several writers brought in by Chairman Pompiliu Eliade. In 1903, he adapted for the stage a story by Georges Courteline. His own play, Săracul Dumitrescu ("Poor Dumitrescu"), was produced by the same company the following year. He was employed by the Oteteleșeanu Park Theater, where, in 1905, he adapted a foreign play, as Mița Tirbușon ("Little Mary Corkscrew"); also then, the "Lyric Theater" staged two other of his adaptations—Doctorul damelor ("A Ladies' Doctor") and Țivila dela hotel Ghidale ("A Civilian Lady in Hotel Ghidale"). In 1903 or 1904, Ranetti also finished his "character novel" Căsnicie modernă ("A Modern Marriage"). He was also writing occasional chronicles of plays staged by the National Theater, many of them taken up in Ion Livescu's Revista Teatrelor, c. 1903, and Universul, c. 1904. One was read by young Victor Eftimiu, a future playwright and friend of Ranetti, who was thus convinced to pursue a career in the field.

Ranetti and the traditionalists had in common a mutual dislike for the Francization and aristocratic pretense of fin de siècle Romanian culture. This hostility seeped into rhyming letters sent by Ranetti to his self-exiled friend Caragiale, and then into a topical volume, the 1904 Franțuzomania ("Frenchie-mania"). Also that year, he became the chief editor at Furnica ("The Ant"). It had been founded by him and Nae Dumitrescu Țăranu, son of a rich agriculturist. He would publish there under a host of pseudonyms, revisiting his Zeflemeaua ones, but also add more to the list: George Biciușcă, Caiafa, Coco, Contele de Techirghiol ("Count of Techirghiol"), Ghiță Delagambrinus (or the mock-aristocratic Lord Ghytza and Don Ghițos Delagambrinos y Mizilos), Netty, Ghiță Nifilistul, Sarsailă, Tovarășul Ghiță. Overall, the magazine was viewed as lowbrow and ribald, including by Caragiale—who did not want to be sent any copies at his new home in Berlin, where he was raising a family.

1900s cartoons in Furnica
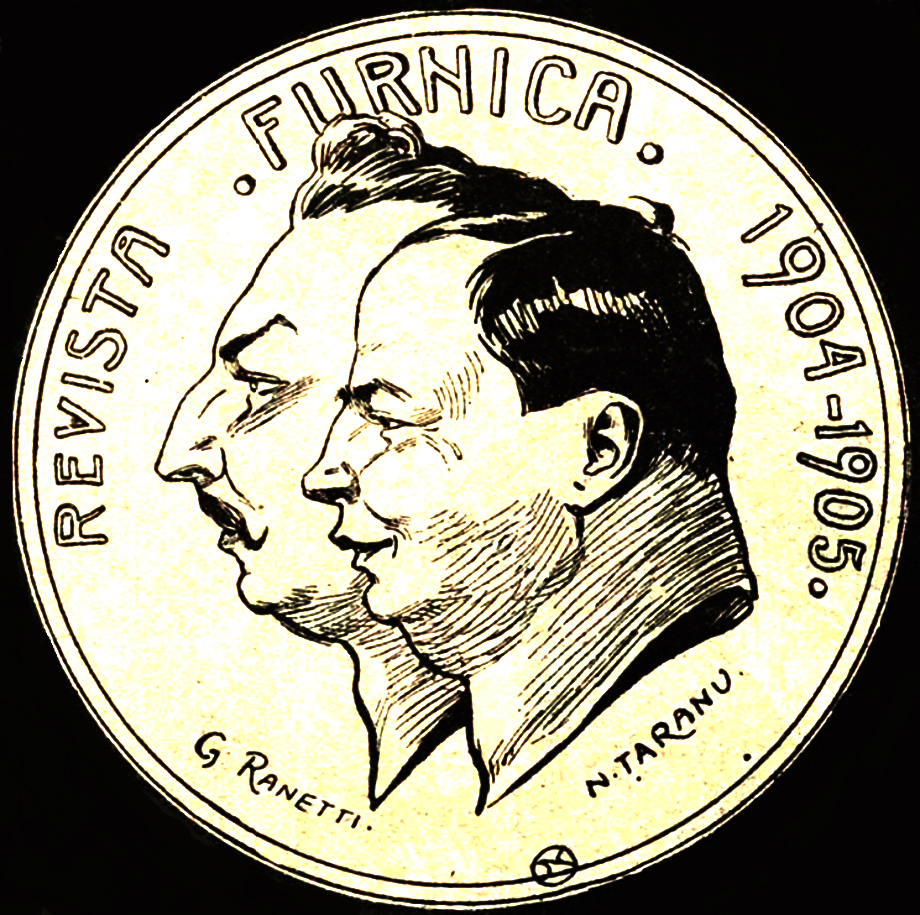
Ranetti and Țăranu, as drawn by Nicolae Petrescu Găină (September 1905)

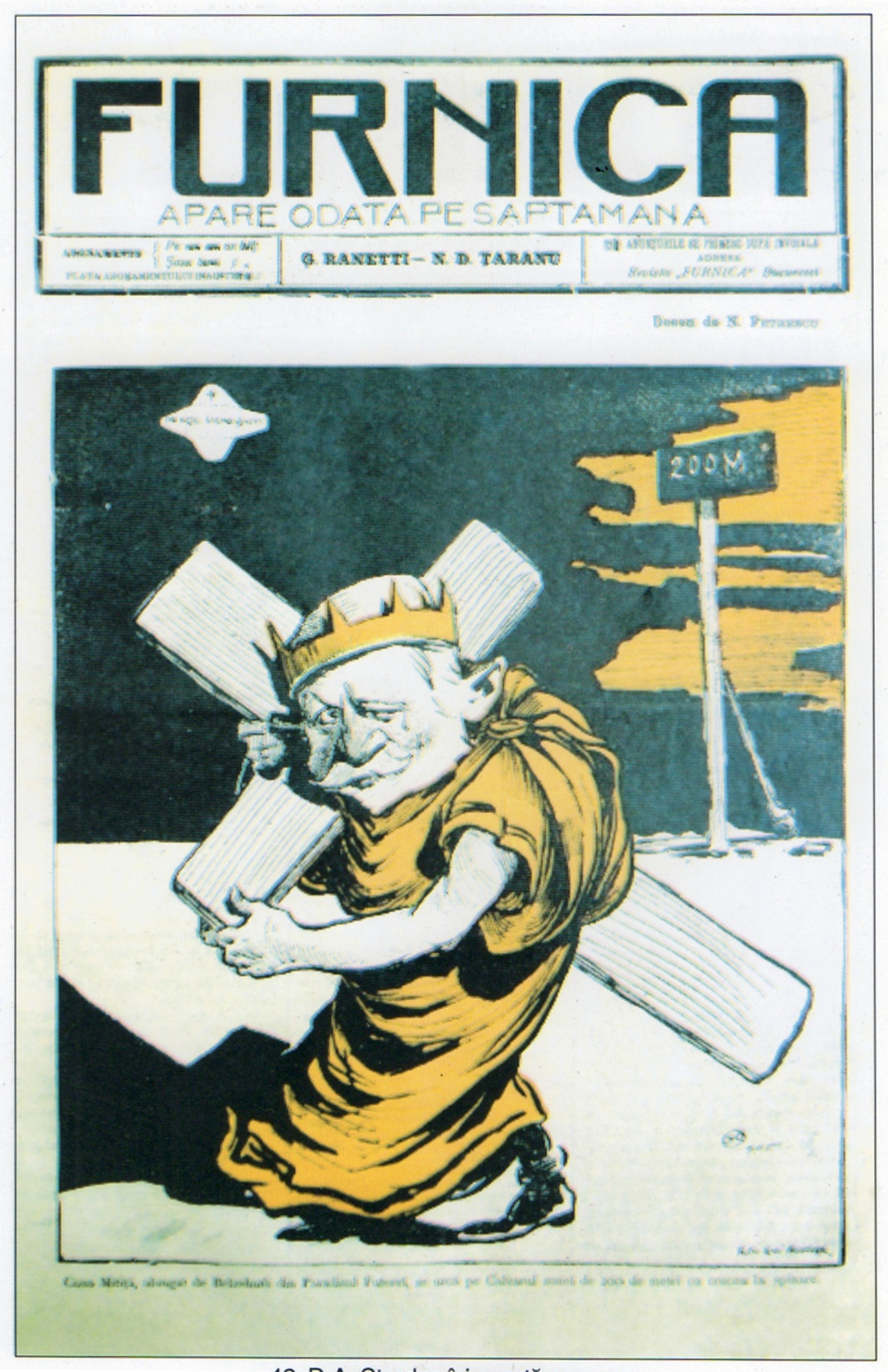
Cover art by Petrescu Găină, featuring Dimitrie Sturdza as Christ (February 1905)

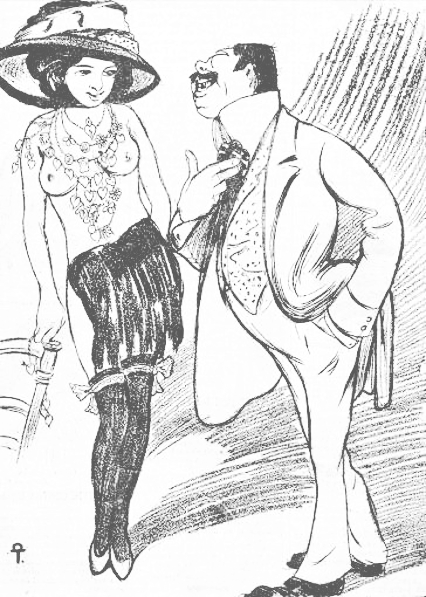
Social cartoon by Ion Theodorescu-Sion (February 1909)

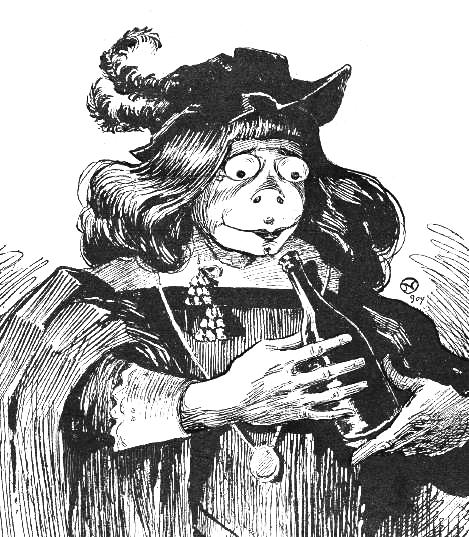
Petrescu Găină's portrait of Ion Brezeanu as Hamlet (October 1904)

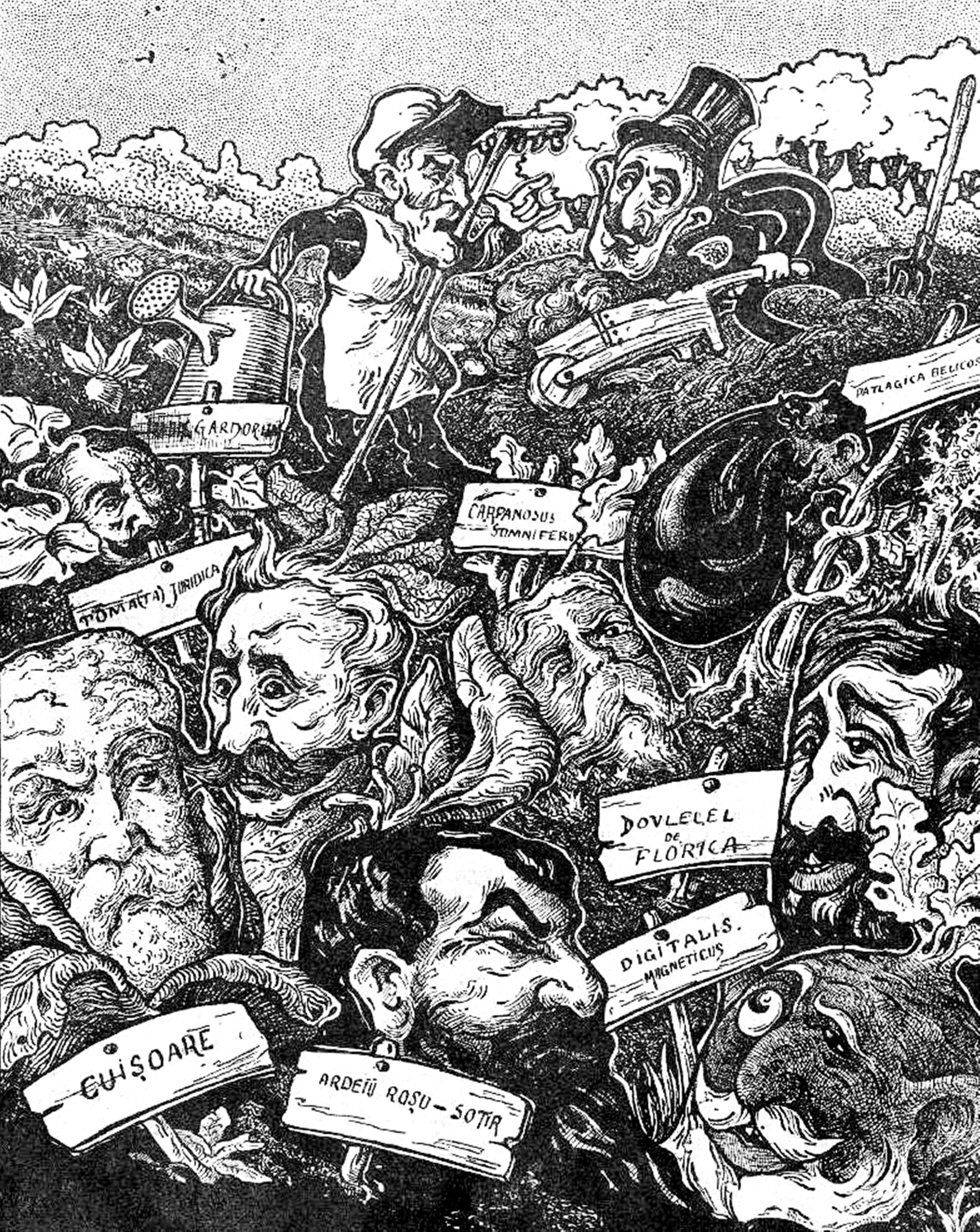
Carol I, Ioan Kalinderu and various politicians, by Witold Rolla-Piekarski (December 1908)

The socialist Eftimiu argued that Furnica's politics were left-of-center, with Ranetti as "a convinced democrat, anti-monarchic, an enemy of those who stood for the bourgeois-landowning society". His pen, Eftimiu claims, "served to castigate racketeering politicians, prejudice, debauchery, fake patriotism, and all the dovetailing high-society that was creaking at the corners." King Carol I himself was ridiculed, and aware of it, but took no measure to suppress Ranetti. On one occasion, Ranetti participated in rendering homage to a Romanian royal, namely the Princess Dowager Marie of Edinburgh. With Cincinat Pavelescu, Radu D. Rosetti, Dimitrie Anghel and Ștefan Octavian Iosif, he co-wrote a poem welcoming her to the Tinerimea Artistică salon of March 1906. Some of Furnica's most noted cartoonists were Tinerimea painters: Ion Theodorescu-Sion, Camil Ressu, Iosif Iser, Francisc Șirato, Nicolae Petrescu Găină, and Ary Murnu—the latter remembered especially for his routine mockery of Ioan Kalinderu, administrator of the crown domains. The articles and caricatures were more lenient toward actor Ion Brezeanu, who was the other stock character in Furnica humor.

Ranetti personally was described by critic Mihail Dragomirescu as an "independent" advocate of Poporanism, on the left wing of Romanian agrarian traditionalism. An occasional contributor to the Poporanist Viața Romînească, he was eventually given a permanent column, called Scrisori din București ("Letters from Bucharest"). Ranetti's rejection of Francophilia became radical by early 1906. On March 15, he and Țăranu signed expressed public support for an anti-Francization manifesto, written and published by Alexandru Vlahuță. The same day, he witnessed the anti-French riots instigated by the nationalist doctrinaire Nicolae Iorga at the National Theater. In a reprint of Franțuzomania, he expressed support for Iorga, calling the movement's repression by the authorities an "intrigue" and "awful slaughter".

Also that year, Ranetti produced the "rhyming prologue" Vatra luminoasă ("Burning Hearth"). As Spiriduș ("Elf"), he published pieces in the anti-monarchy gazette Protestarea, which was probably directly handled by Jean Miclescu, who represented a republican wing of the Conservative caucus. According to the left-wing magazine Democrația, Ranetti was in charge of Protestarea as well, but only as a front for Nicolae Filipescu, who ran Epoca. According to this version of events, Filipescu used Ranetti to "bewilder the popular masses" into supporting an "oligarchy" that had superficially embraced republicanism; Protestarea was closed down by Filipescu, since it only stirred "contempt from the popular masses". In tandem, Furnica's politics became an embarrassment for the governments of Gheorghe Grigore Cantacuzino and Dimitrie Sturdza, during the early stages of the 1907 Peasants' Revolt. The issues of February 15 and March 15 were confiscated by Ministry of Internal Affairs. Two more volumes came out in 1907, as Fabule ("Fables") and the verse comedy Romeo și Julietta la Mizil ("Romeo and Juliet from Mizil"), followed in 1909 by the selection Schițe vesele ("Cheerful Sketches").

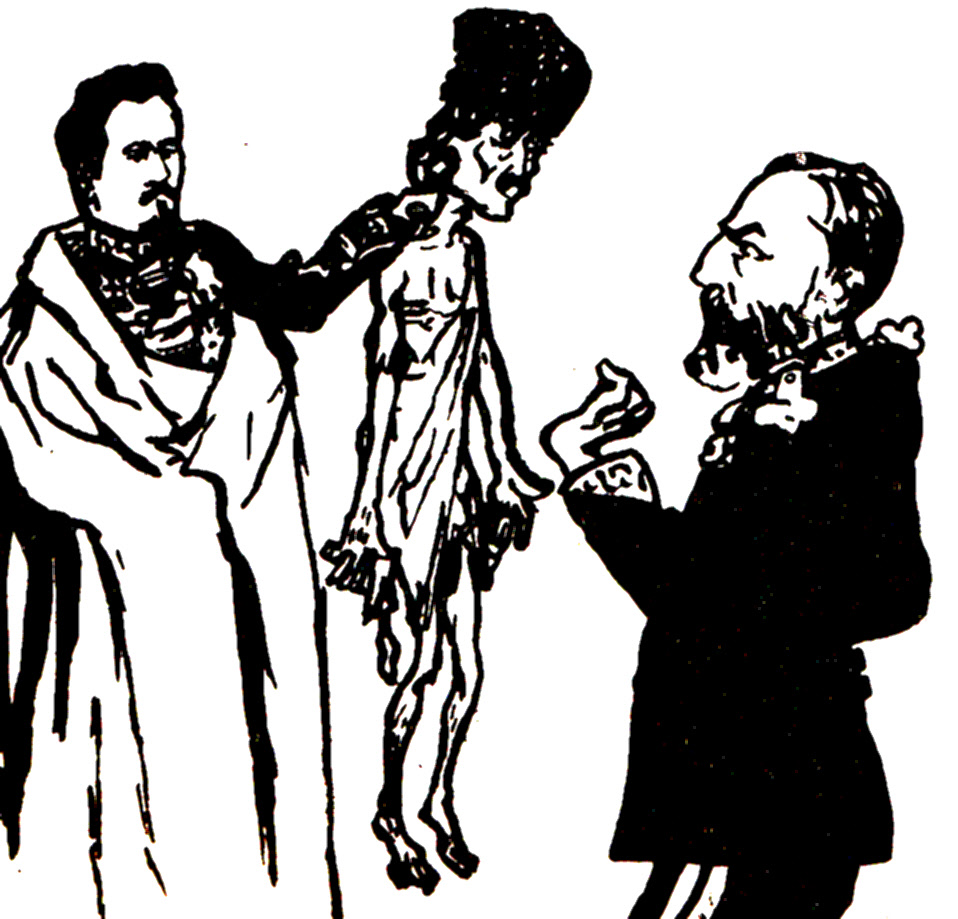
Anonymous cartoon in Protestarea (1906): an emaciated peasant, held up by Alexandru Ioan Cuza for Carol I to acknowledge

Although Ranetti continued to be published by the right-wing traditionalist press, and most notably by Iorga's Sămănătorul and Ramuri reviews (1905–1907), his Furnica was viewed by the culturally conservative as rather distasteful. Iorga, a noted target of Murnu's satire, argued in 1922:

For a while, that is to say for as long as they could maintain evident independence and choose between easy jokes and social–political satire for some definite purpose, the magazine Furnica, of Messrs. Gh[eorghe] Ranetti and Țăranu, could exercise real influence over a superficial layer of Romanian society.

Iorga's coauthor, Constantin Bacalbașa (Tony's brother), qualified such statements:

Various attempts at putting out all sorts of papers, some of them pornographic in content, could not take hold [...]. Only in 1904 [with Furnica] did there emerge a humorous paper that showed promise, and that survived to this day. [...] Leaving behind the old habit of turning a humorous gazette into a purely opposition newspaper, Messrs. G. Ranetti and N. D. Țăranu have created themselves a weekly newspaper of varied content, with very little politics.

=== Early 1910s ===
Ranetti's work for the stage was continued in 1909, when his adaptation of the Moș Teacă stories was produced by Blanduzia Theater. Romeo și Julietta la Mizil, which became a best-seller, was itself written especially for the stage. It premiered at the National Theater in the 1909–1911 seasons, alongside Ranetti's translation of Henry Bataille's La Femme nue. His translation was panned by professionals, and deemed "implausibly bad" by dramatist Liviu Rebreanu. Ranetti responded in Epoca, calling attention to Rebreanu's past imprisonment in Austria-Hungary; to Rebreanu's great chagrin, he depicted him as an actual criminal, rather than as a victim of anti-Romanian machinations in Transylvania. La Femme nue in Ranetti's translation was nonetheless also mocked by Albert Honigman in Adevărul, prompting Ranetti to respond with an epigram. By contrast, Ranetti's own play was well-liked by the establishment, and he was granted third place in the National Theater's biannual awards ceremony, June 1910; he shared that distinction, worth 500 francs, with Anghel and Iosif.

At first, Ranetti chided Caragiale, who, on his trips back to Romania, had become an orator for the Conservative-Democratic Party, but soon embarked on a political career of his own. Ranetti decided to run for the Chamber's 2nd College seat in Ilfov during early elections in 1909. As reported by eyewitness Henri Stahl, there was widespread voter fraud, and Ranetti had no observer on hand to report on it. Ranetti also registered as an Ilfov candidate in the March 1911 election, as a Conservative-Democrat (or "Conservative-Nationalist", as that party called itself), with endorsements by Iorga's own Democratic Nationalists. In his statement, Iorga supported Ranetti as "a cordial friend to the peasants", noting that "his 'conservatism' is a morsel of Junimism, and shall fade out along with the last of the Junimists (of whom very few are left!)." He lost again, polling only 326 votes.

A fellow journalist, Alexandru V. Cazimir, writes that Ranetti "never sought a stipend", and therefore was always "engaged in a barbaric battle against poverty". Ranetti is also known to have derided orders and decorations, proposing to decorate his friends with distinctions such as the "umbilical cordon". He did however hold several offices: having served as vice president of the Romanian Writers' Society in its original avatar of 1908, he was elected (April 6, 1911) on the first Steering Committee of the Romanian Theatrical Society, alongside R. D. Rosetti, George Diamandy, A. de Herz, and Paul Gusty. During May 1911, he and C. Bacalbașa left for London, where they were to cover the coronation of George V. Later that summer, Ranetti and Eftimiu traveled into Transylvania, where they witnessed aerial shows by the Romanian aviation pioneer, Aurel Vlaicu, and met with a visiting Caragiale. On their way to the ASTRA celebrations of Blaj, they took the "derelict car" of Andrei Popovici, a Transylvanian volunteer in the Second Boer War.

During that time, Ranetti was keeping company with a group of actors that included Petre Liciu—he covered Liciu's death in April 1912, with a Furnica article that broke with the comedic genre; also then, he witnessed Liciu's final project, the silent film Independența României, writing what was probably the first-ever Romanian film reportage, covering its production. By 1913, he had returned to his work as a dramaturge, adapting Paul Gavault's L'idée de Françoise. Before and during the Second Balkan War, he and Furnica began exposing cases of malfeasance in office, involving the higher echelons of the Conservative Party—focusing on Petre P. Carp and Alexandru Bădărău's alleged nepotism. This period saw his involvement in theatrical and literary polemics: in 1913, he attacked in Epoca and Furnica Alexandru Davila, chairman of the National Theater, alleging that he was corrupt, womanizing, and violent toward his staff. Around that time, Transylvanian literary critic Ilarie Chendi began referring to Ranetti as Javranetti (from javră, "scoundrel").

Ranetti returned with books only in 1914, when he issued another standalone volume of prose, Matache Pisălog ("Matache the Bore"). In May, just before the start of World War I, George and Anastase Ranetti returned with Ion Gorun on a cultural tour of Transylvania, attending Romanian-only events in Arad and Șiria. Writing an epigram in honor of Vasile Goldiș, Ranetti was there as a delegate of both the Romanian Journalists' Syndicate and Iorga's Cultural League for the Unity of All Romanians. Shortly after, Ranetti and Furnica joined a coalition of Francophiles and nationalists, supporting neutral Romania's alliance with the Entente Powers. In December 1914, Ranetti joined the Cultural League's Steering Committee, whose secretary was Iorga. One of the regulars at literary hot-spots such as Casa Capșa and Kübler Coffeehouse, and a contributor to Cristu Negoescu's review România de Mâine, he was focused on a dispute with the more skeptical Emil Fagure, of Adevărul. As noted years later by their common acquaintance I. Peltz, this turned into a quarrel:

Ranetti the humorist could not maintain his serenity and objective judgment in his everyday life, as various exaggerations of the chauvinistic kind seeped into his writing.

=== Wartime relocation and return ===
In early 1915, Ranetti received from King Ferdinand I the Bene Merenti medal, first class. Also then, his revue Războiul la șantan ("War at the Caf'conc") was being performed at the Carol cel Mare Theater. It depicted the adventures of a Bukovina Jew who escapes war by moving to Bucharest, under a false Romanian identity; several political figures of the day, including Nicolae Filipescu, were mocked as secondary characters. At that stage of his career, Ranetti was becoming opposed to the war, and in particular to those who profited from it, making his feelings known in a 1916 "sonnet-fable". Romania eventually signed a pact with the Entente, entering the war in late 1916. Just days after, Ranetti was called on to work alongside Iorga and others at the Romanian Army's propaganda newspaper, Gazeta Ostașilor. Only two issues were ever published.

The Ententist side soon appeared morally defeated. Following a Central Powers counteroffensive and the fall of Bucharest (during which Furnica began a long hiatus), Ranetti followed the army on its hasty retreat, settling in Iași. There, he earned an editorial position at România, the nationalist propaganda magazine, which had been created by General Prezan and Mihail Sadoveanu as a means to "sustain the morale of soldiers and civilians." Ranetti's contributions included an October 17 editorial, in which he asked Romanian Jews to cease speaking in German for the duration of war. His employment at România entitled Ranetti to "a daily purchase of two liters of wine". From March 1917, he and Petre Locusteanu also put out the satirical weekly Greerul ("The Cricket"). While working there, Ranetti often returned to his earlier pseudonyms, including George Biciușcă and Kiriac Napadarjan, but also signed himself Geo and Marchizul de Kogealac ("Marquis of Cogealac"). By then, in occupied Bucharest, some of his former colleagues were lambasting Ranetti for his political choices. In his Scena daily, the Theatrical Society's Herz called Ranetti "morally responsible for our misery". Herz suggested for Ranetti, Locusteanu, N. N. Beldiceanu and Corneliu Moldovanu to be captured and caned, "so that we may unclog their alcohol-seeped, infatuated, stupid brains." Allegedly, Ranetti's home in Bucharest was ransacked by the Imperial German Army.

Despite the initial setbacks, the Ententist side returned to prominence in late 1918, with the defeat of Germany. On September 9, Greerul put out its last issue. Back issues of Furnica, dating to November 1916, appeared at the Bucharest newsstands around December 11, apparently without the editors' consent. On December 14, Furnica officially reappeared, but without Ranetti as head editor: the December 28 issue announced that he had sold his stock to Țăranu. According to the staff critic at Gândirea, the magazine was declining, "scraping a living from localizations and adaptions, cheaply paid for and cheaply provided, with an inferior technology." By January 1919, Ranetti had returned to Bucharest, again a member of Iorga's Cultural League, campaigning for the consolidation of Greater Romania. He was mostly focused on collecting his scattered verse. These appeared as bound books: at Casa Școalelor, De atunci și d-acolo, versuri ușurele scrise-n clipe grele ("From Then and There: Easy Rhymes of Tougher Times", 1921); at Cartea Românească, Poezii ("Poems", 1923). Other late works include a mock-psychological novel in verse, Domnișoara Miau ("Miss Meow", 1921) and the prose work Domnișoara Strakinidy ("Miss Porringeridis")—both at Cartea Românească. He also diversified his contributions in the press, collaborating with, or being republished by, Românul of Arad, Fagurele of Ploiești, and Straja and Robia Modernă of Craiova. These were followed later by Curierul Sanitar, Cronica Romanului, Glasul Țării, Praftorița, and the new edition of Cuvânt Moldovenesc.

Ranetti became an officer in the Ordre des Palmes académiques of the French Third Republic during a ceremony in September 1919. However, fellow humorist Tudor Mușatescu, who met him at around that time, reports that he was living in dire poverty: he only owned one overcoat, gifted to him actor Constantin Nottara, and had to share his income with his brother, who had been blinded during the war. In 1921–1922, under Conservative-Democratic and National Liberal cabinets (Ionescu, Sixth Brătianu), he was undersecretary for propaganda in the Ministry of Internal Affairs. In 1924, he became the editorial secretary of Universul, under publisher Stelian Popescu. "George Biciușcă" still made occasional returns to Furnica: in late 1923, it carried his riposte against his wartime enemy Herz, calling for his work to be censored. From 1925 to his death, Ranetti was again editor of Furnica, restoring his partnership with Țăranu. Some of his final articles, appearing in Universul in 1926, discussed his wartime meetings with Sadoveanu and the România staff. Other late pieces appeared in Dreptatea, Foaia Noastră, Glasul Patriei of Craiova, and Ion Moța Sr's Libertatea.

Overall, Ranetti's work comprised at least fifteen years of daily texts and, as noted by Gorun, "if collected, would amount to a genuine library." As Mușatescu recounts, his friend was upset that his poetic talents had been wasted on since-irrelevant affairs, without however realizing that he would always be recognized as a "great humorist." In 1928, he was working on a collected works edition, also at Cartea Românească, but never saw it through. Ranetti was also trying to solved his living arrangements, venturing into Chitila and Buftea in search of an affordable lodging—the search is alluded to in one of his final contributions at Universul. He reported that he only had an income of 12,000 lei, equally divided between his salaries at Furnica and Universul and his pension as a veteran journalist; he declared his hope that he would die suddenly, without having to go into a hospital. During mid-1927, he was allowed into the writers' retreat at Sâmbăta de Sus, where he spent his final vacation.

Ranetti died on May 2, 1928, in Bucharest, and was buried at Bellu cemetery, Plot 98. According to Cazimir, his cheap, firwood coffin contrasted with the crowd of admirers who had shown up to pay their final respects. Days later, eulogies appeared in Gândirea, Țara Noastră, and Viitorul, followed by a retrospective article in Universul Literar and, in later years, by Tudor Arghezi and D. I. Suchianu's essays on Ranetti. Furnica survived under Țăranu's management, but became in 1930 a supplement of the daily Vremea. In 1940, Ranetti was dedicated a special issue of Ștefan Baciu's Veselia. He was outlived by his common-law wife, Cleopatra "Cleo" Iamandi, who died in 1932; her last years were spent in acute poverty, prompting Arghezi to issue appeals for financial aid. His brother Atanase lived to 1947. He contributed a dedication on George's grave, and was eventually buried next to him.

== Work ==
Ranetti carried on the satirical tradition of Moftul Românesc, being in particular influenced by Ion Luca Caragiale and Anton Bacalbașa—but also, to some degree, by D. Teleor and Joséphin Soulary. As introduced by his entry in the University of Florence Romanian literature project, he was "a minor poet, prose writer, and playwright"; "prolific, gifted with an accessible verve, he wrote facile prose." This relies on earlier critical verdicts by critics and cultural historians. As noted in 1941 by George Călinescu: "These days, just about nobody would dare confer upon G. Ranetti a literato's status." Nonetheless, in their time, Ranetti's satires were celebrated by the literary establishment, including Caragiale, the columnists at Viața Romînească, and the philosopher-critic Titu Maiorescu. Overall, Călinescu suggests, "one cannot ask of his journalism that it endure, but we must admit that it reached a level that has never been touched since." According to Peltz: "Gheorghe Ranetti squandered his talent in the pages of a humorous magazine—albeit one of importance: Furnica—and in bohemia."

Călinescu saw Ranetti's verse as carried by his "sufficient if amateurish culture", requiring of the reader "a certain finesse". With his poetic debut as "Dom Paladu", Ranetti parodied and impersonated George D. Pallade, the National-Liberal politico, making abundant use of 1890s Bucharest slang. In his fictional avatar, Pallade appeared as "a great carouser, something of a rube, and a lover of womenfolk". One such piece has Dom Paladu complaining about the arrival of autumn, which inevitably slows down his philandering—he expresses his wish to "discuss matters of love with the ladies"—but not as socialists expect him to. As observed by Cazimir, Paladu managed to upstage his real-life model: "to us, [he] only exists because of Ranetti's poems, and regardless of his physical existence."

Works in the genre include stanzas written in French for a Romanian public, translating Romanian idioms and proverbs in literal fashion. For instance, he referred to an insignificant loss as to a dommage en champignons (from the Romanian pagubă-n ciuperci, "a waste of mushrooms"), and to a very unlikely situation as quand tu verrais ton chignon (când ți-oi vedea ceafa, "when you'll be seeing your nape"). As noted by Gorun, Ranetti produced several "poems of deep sentiment, of butterflies, and trees, and nightingales", published with "the discretion of true art" in Viața Romînească. According to writer Al. Bădăuță, Ranetti excelled in the fable genre, producing works that were "truly precious and accomplished". Building on enthusiastic observations made in 1907 by the Poporanist Garabet Ibrăileanu, scholar Sanda Radian identifies these works as primarily political, using the trappings of classical fables to mock the bourgeoisie and to uphold the exploited peasantry. In sharp contrast to such premeditation, other poems were "joyful seeds" or "hurried improvisations", occasioned by political events. Some stanzas, published in Furnica and attributed to Ranetti, were irreverently anti-monarchic:

Un regat pentru-o țigare
A grăit un nuștiucare
Dar azi, având în vedere,
Monarhismul în scădere,
Considerând, bat-o vina,
Că-i republică și China,
Orice post eu aș alege,
Chiar și popă la Mizil,
Decât acest post de rege,
Azi atâta de fragil.

Translation:

My kingdom for a cigarette,
Some claimant is reported to have said;
But seen as monarchism is diced,
And also given that, for Christ,
All countries seem to want them downed—
Even the Chinese have sacked the crowned—,
Whatever job you'll see me step up for,
A Mizil parson or some other minor thing,
I must not wish for something more:
It cannot be this fragile post of king.

When it was first published, Romeo și Julietta la Mizil enlisted complaints from poet Gheorghe Kernbach, who declared himself horrified by the "crudeness" of its comedic realism. Mihail Dragomirescu found the comedy of manners "vulgar", and described the related piece, Săracul Dumitrescu, as a sample of the Poporanists' didactic art, overall "melodramatic". Largely a parody of its classical model, Romeo și Julietta la Mizil followed the conflict of National Liberals and Conservatives, "with Shakespearean situations translated to Mizil's urban conditions." It is also heavily indebted to Caragiale, to the point of intertextuality, and, as Eftimiu recalls, "readers probably associated" it with O scrisoare pierdută.

The play shows the two local party leaders coming to terms with their children having fallen in love with each other, and switching sides, only to find themselves occupying each other's starting position. In the background, various secondary characters refer to other topics of satire: the double-dealing policeman, the cunning governess, the incomprehensible telegraphist. Scholar Ioana Pârvulescu uses the work as a case study, highlighting Caragiale's superiority: although it uses "the exact same prime matter" and "the topoi of the Belle Époque", Romeo și Julietta la Mizil proves "that one may produce a masterpiece, and the other a kerfuffle". In Ranetti's text, she notes, the wordplay covers "mannequins and cardboard", while Caragiale uses journalistic speech to invoke "live humans", "preserving and treasuring life". She acknowledges that, otherwise, Ranetti displays an "inventive language" and "virtuosity".

In his prose, Ranetti took inspiration from real-life situations, and explored their comical and licentious potential. Thus, his achievements in prose include reportage pieces written with a deadpan seriousness, but with absurd humor and hints of the obscene. According to Pârvulescu, "everything that Ranetti ever wrote in Furnica magazine is plagued by vulgarity and inconsistency." His noted contributions there include jibes at Maria Mihăescu, the notorious courtesan and fellow Prahova native, whom he famously nicknamed Mița Biciclista ("Cycling Molly")—according to local legend, she had rejected Ranetti's advances, and referred to him as a "swine".
