= Haralamb Lecca =

Romanian poet, playwright and translator (1873– 1920)

Haralamb George Lecca
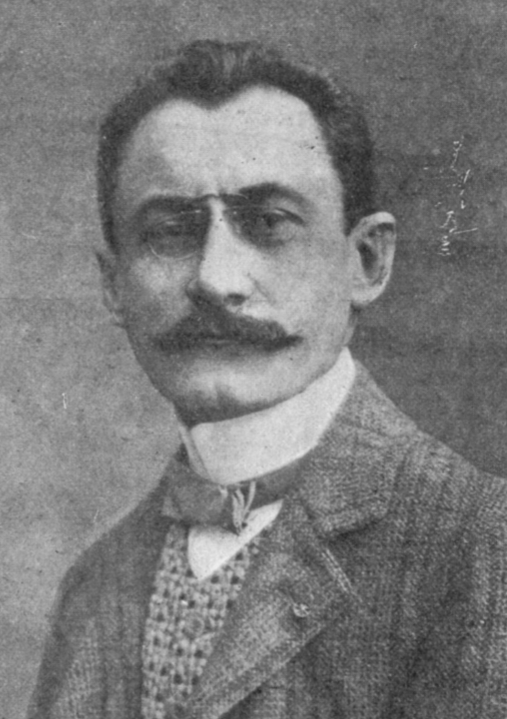
- Lecca in 1912
- Born: February 23, 1873; Caracal, Romanați County, Kingdom of Romania
- Died: March 9, 1920 (aged 47); Bucharest
- Resting place: Bellu Cemetery, Bucharest
- Occupations: dramaturge, translator, stage director, theater manager, actor, screenwriter, journalist, publisher, illustrator, artillery officer, civil servant
- Writing career
- Pen name: Câmpeanu, Sybil
- Period: ca. 1890–1917
- Genres: lyric poetry, tragicomedy, verse drama, political theater, melodrama, revue, Christian drama, prose poem, short story, satire, epigram, essay, memoir, biography, travel writing
- Notable awards: Adamachi Prize (1898, 1901); Bene Merenti (1899)
- Movements: Symbolism; Naturalism; Junimea

Haralamb George Lecca (Romanian pronunciation: [haraˈlamb ˈdʒe̯ordʒe ˈleka]; February 23 [O.S. February 10] 1873 – March 9, 1920), also known as Haralamb Leca, Har. Lecca, or Haralambie Lecca, was a Romanian poet, playwright and translator. He belonged to an upper-class family, being the grandson of artist Constantin Lecca and brother of genealogist Octav George Lecca, as well as nephew and rival of writer Ion Luca Caragiale. He had an unsettled youth, studying medicine and law for a while, and also reaching a Sub-Officer's rank in the terrestrial army. He debuted in literature under the guidance of Bogdan Petriceicu Hasdeu, who also employed Lecca's services as a medium. His early work was in poetry, often outstandingly macabre, evidencing his familiarity with 19th-century French literature and hinting at a vague affiliation with Symbolism. Briefly a collaborator of Junimea society, then of its dissident wings, Lecca never joined the fledgling Symbolist movement, and spent his later life in relative isolation from all literary circles.

Lecca's poetry, recognized as formally accomplished in its context, won him literary awards from the Romanian Academy, but was discarded by later critics as uninspired and ultimately insignificant. As a dramatist, Lecca impressed his contemporaries. His numbered set of tragicomedies, veering into naturalism and political theater, were the height of fashion in ca. 1898–1908, propelled by a troupe that included Aristide Demetriade, Aristizza Romanescu, Velimir Maximilian and Constantin Nottara. As a dramaturge, he increased the repertoire with numerous but unequal translations, beginning with verse drama by William Shakespeare; this work later led him to contribute translations of Western European prose, in which he was prolific. Lecca also worked directly with the actors, as director of his and others' plays, and sometimes even took up roles on the stage; both his own performance and his insistence on method acting by others were often repudiated or ridiculed.

His conflicts with actors and managers resulted in his sacking from Iași National Theatre, and then his banishment from the National Theatre Bucharest, leaving him to seek work with private companies. In the early 1910s, he also collected his prose poems, also producing memoirs and essays that outlined his ideas on society, and Christian drama. His contribution to screenwriting, albeit pioneering, was shaded by revelations of plagiarism from Caragiale. By then a veteran of the Second Balkan War, he fought on the Romanian front of World War I, and died soon after this ended, following a losing battle with paralysis. He had been largely forgotten as a writer, and was being derided by modernists, even though his plays continued to be performed into the 1930s.

== Biography ==
=== Early life ===
Born in Caracal, his parents were George (or Gheorghe) Lecca and his wife Zoe (née Mănăstireanu or Mănăstiriceanu); his grandfather was the painter and journalist Constantin Lecca. The family belonged to boyar nobility, and, according to family legend, was established in Ancient Rome by Publius Porcius Laeca; their roots may also lead back to Byzantine Bulgaria and the Barony of Gritzena. In Wallachia, the family patriarch was allegedly the Aga Leca Racotă, aide-de-camp of Prince Michael the Brave, and possibly also Michael's brother-in-law. His direct male descendant, Armaș Radu Lecca, emigrated to Corona (Brașov) in 1730; it was there that his grandson, the painter and Paharnic, was born.

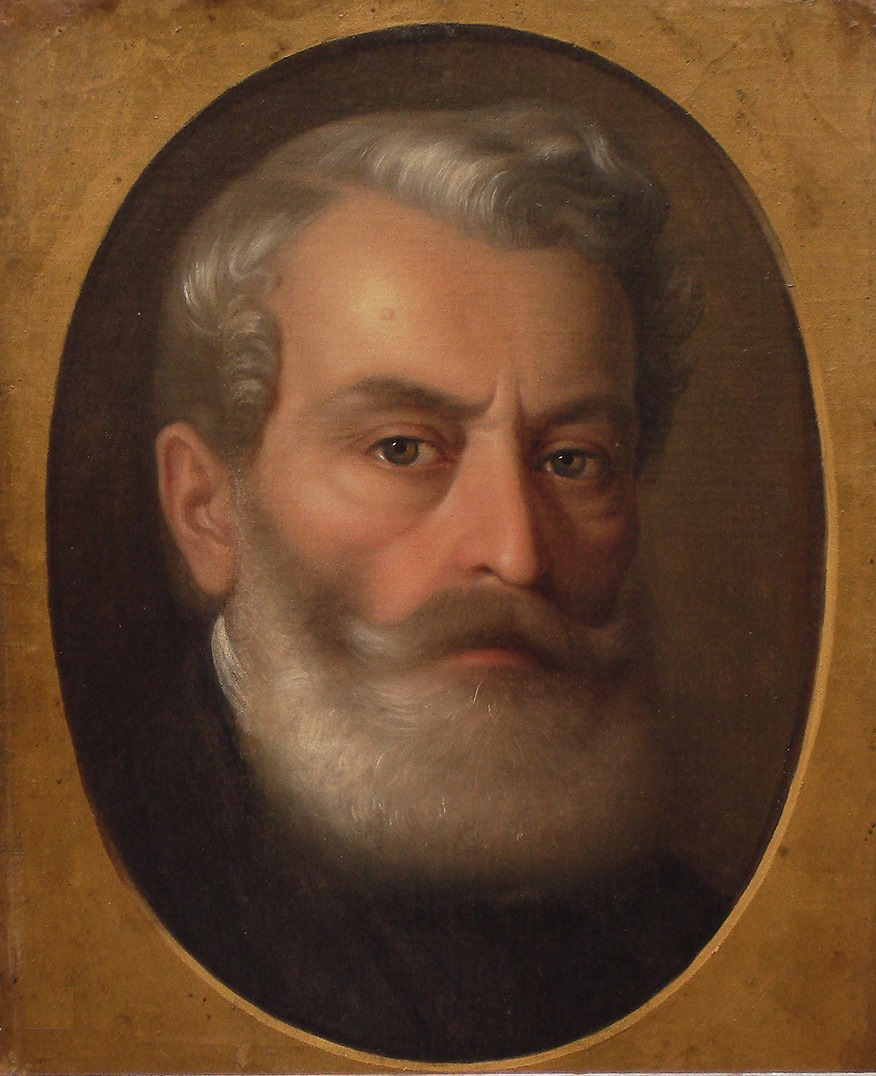
Constantin Lecca, Haralamb's grandfather. Portrait by Gheorghe Tattarescu

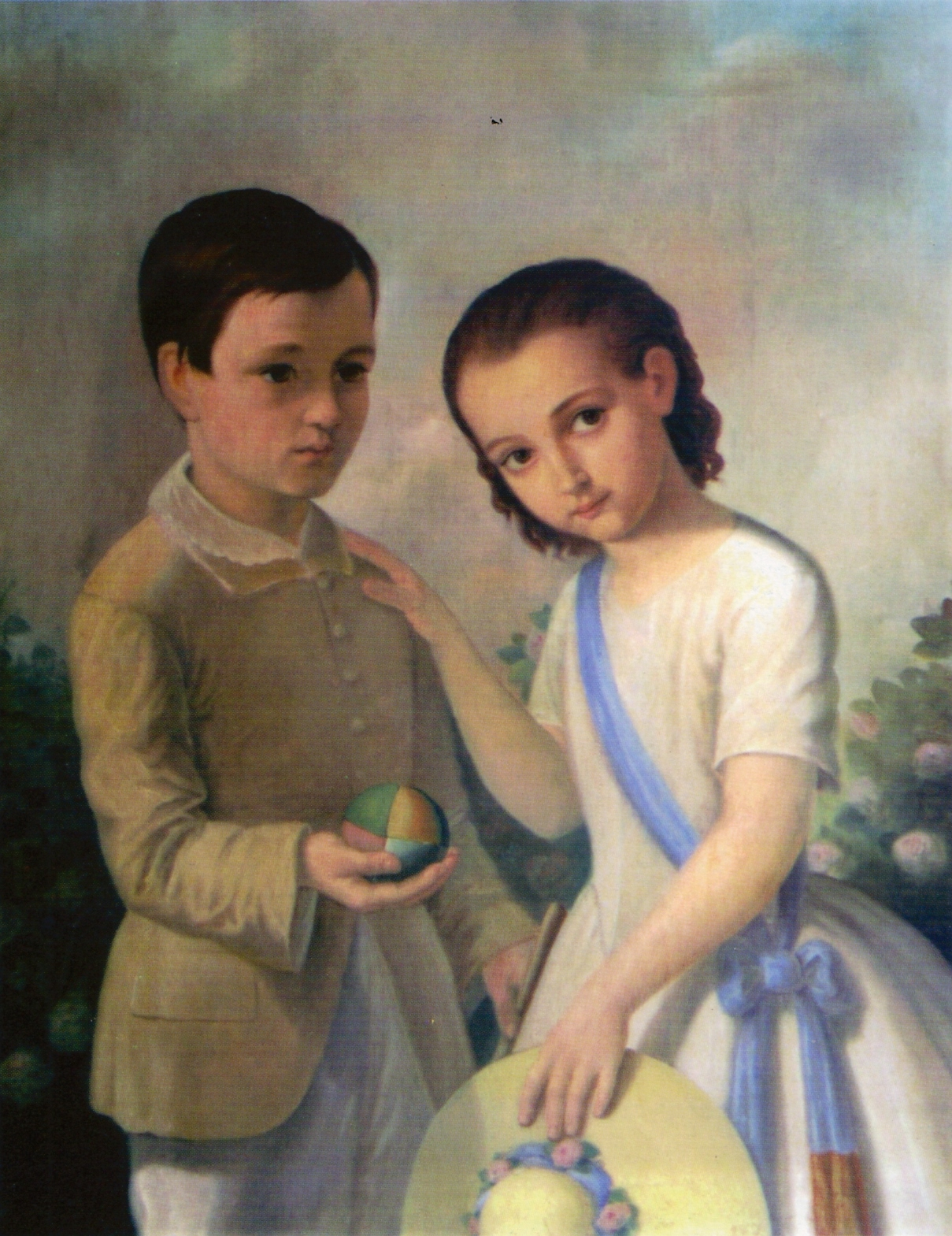
The Lecca children, by Constantin Lecca

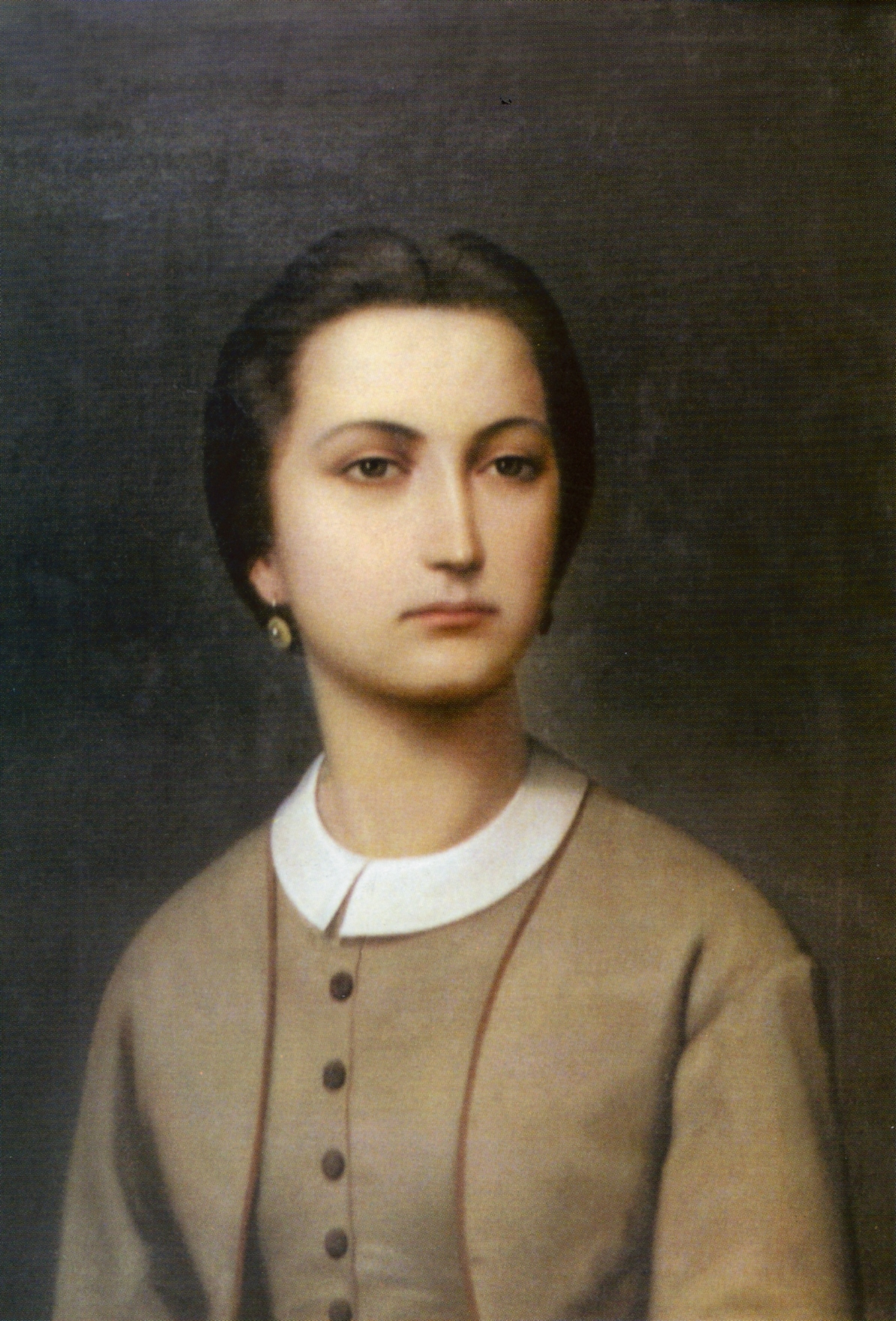
Cleopatra Lecca-Poenaru, Haralamb's aunt; by Constantin Lecca

Haralamb's uncles, settled in Oltenia, were Constantin Lecca Jr, a clerk and member of the Assembly of Deputies, and Grigore, a career soldier; he was also very distantly related to Dimitrie Lecca, who held major offices in the United Principalities and the Kingdom of Romania. His aunt Cleopatra was married to Colonel Grigore Poenaru, nephew of the polymath Petrache Poenaru. She was also a maternal cousin of the dramatist Ion Luca Caragiale, and, for a while, the love interest of poet Mihai Eminescu. Haralamb's father, George Lecca, a cavalryman, had fought with distinction in Romania's war of independence—the setting of at least one poem by his son. From a later marriage, he had a much younger son, the magistrate Octav George Lecca, later locally famous as a genealogist, heraldist, and anthropologist, and a daughter, Elvira Yga Lecca.

Haralamb Lecca was an Oltenian by birth, his work sometimes included in regionalist anthologies. However, as noted by Oltenian scholar C. D. Fortunescu, this was a stretch. Lecca, he argues, "do[es] not owe anything to this region, [...] only the happenstance of [his] birth here, or a short period in [his] childhood, has ever put [him] into contact with us." From 1880, Haralamb was listed among the interns of Pontbriant–Schewitz Institute of Bucharest, in the same class as actor Ion Livescu, but later finished primary school in his native town, attended the Cantemir High School in Bucharest, and completed high school in Craiova. A reserve Sub-lieutenant in the 6th Artillery Regiment, he may also have had a stint clerking in the Ministry of Finance. In 1897, he studied medicine at the University of Paris (inspiring him to write poems about dissection), but returned to matriculate at the University of Bucharest, where he studied law. However, in January 1901, he was reportedly studying letters at the Free University of Brussels. He graduated from the law faculty in Bucharest, but only after along hiatus, and reportedly held both a Medical Doctor degree and a doctorate in letters.

=== Symbolist debut and Hasdeu circle ===
While he was still in Paris, Bogdan Petriceicu Hasdeu's Revista Nouă published Lecca's first poem, În cimitir ("In the Graveyard"), and awarded Lecca its annual literary prize. According to Nicolae Iorga, Lecca's "poetic fecundity" soon took over, turning that magazine into a literary tribune rather than the scientific organ designed by Hasdeu. Following this, Lecca, an occasional literary columnist at Adevărul, became was one of the main contributors to Ioan Slavici's Vatra from 1894 and, from 1899, to Aurel Popovici's daily, Minerva, his work also appearing in N. Petrașcu and D. C. Ascanio's Literatură și Artă Română. At the time, Lecca was translating from Tennyson's Enoch Arden, from a French version. He printed this in 1896, followed a while after by selected verses from Romania's German-speaking queen, Carmen Sylva.

His collections of poetry, generally known by numbered titles, began in 1896 with Prima, prefaced by Hasdeu. Like the following installments (Cinci poeme, 1897; Secunda, 1898; Sexta, 1901; Octava, 1904; A noua, 1904), it showed strong influences from French writers, in particular François Coppée and other Symbolists. Per George Călinescu, these works featured verses that were "odiously interpreted" from French models, and with numerous "trivialities". Philosopher Mihail Iorgulescu, "the only man to have wept for [Lecca]", also finds that in his lyrical poetry, Lecca remained epic and melodramatic, which made his poetic work dated, "once the setting that contained it fell apart." Similarly, Henric Sanielevici asserts that he had "all the qualities that one might pick up working in cabinets". However, journalist Mihail Mora defended Lecca against accusations that he had no poetic soul, suggesting that his lyrical "objectivity" and precision were studied, and alternated with "sentimental outbursts." As critic and theatrologist Rodica Florea writes, Lecca did have an "exotic nuance" and a preference for the standards of Symbolist verse, but altogether "exterior, lacking in significance". His poetry stood out for its "physiological detail" and "interminable sadism", with Lecca "gratuitously insisting [...] on sketching out hideous, terrifying or pitiful portraits", on "stenches", "cancer", "pus and fetid dressings".

Lecca attained superior technical quality when it came to meter ("impeccable", according to Mora), but even his skill was panned by Iorga, who noted that Lecca had "nothing to surprise us with in his rhymes or rhythms". Lecca was appreciated by critics in his 1890s context, winning the Romanian Academy's V. Adamachi Prize in 1898, and a Bene Merenti medal, conferred by King Carol I, in 1899. While Ilarie Chendi protested against Lecca's "deranged inspiration", he qualified his verdict by insisting that it was nonetheless the inspiration of a "refined artist". Inspiring in turn fellow authors such as Alexandru Toma, Lecca's poems were held in high regard by Hasdeu. Although he initially rejected Lecca as a mere "imitator", he welcomed him at his Editura Socec salon, where Lecca met Radu D. Rosetti, Cincinat Pavelescu, Ludovic Dauș, and the more senior George Ionescu-Gion.

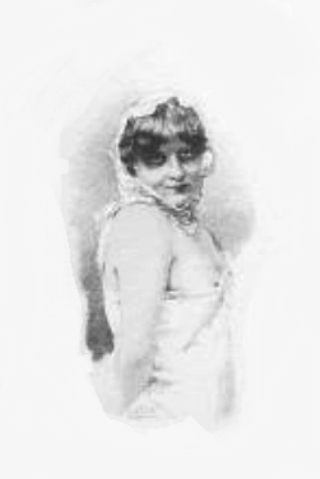
Lecca's illustration to the poem Osĕndita ("A Woman Damned"), in Octava, 1904.

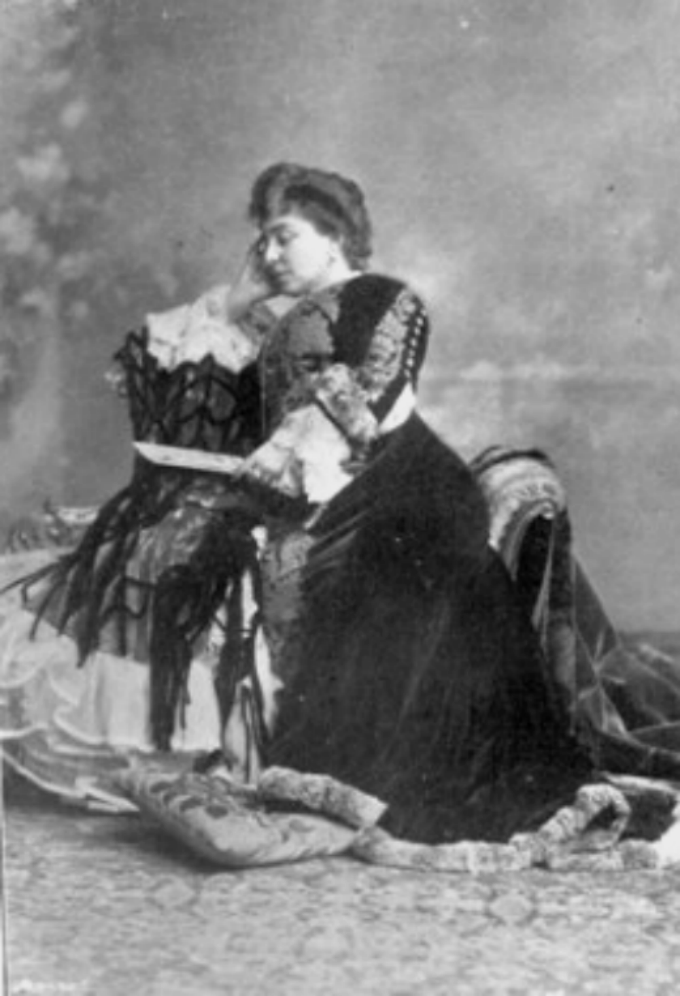
Aristizza Romanescu in Lecca's Septima. Câiniĭ, 1902

As Rosetti reports, Lecca was for a while employed as a regular journalist by Gazeta Poporului, while he himself worked at Țara; the two would jibe at each other using notes and epigrams in each one's newspaper. Lecca was also an amateur draftsman, who contributed 89 vignettes to his own Octava, 18 of which were copied from other artists. He and Hasdeu shared this preoccupation, as well as a passion for the occult, spiritism, and mediumship, with Lecca going into trances, attempting to draw for Hasdeu the "real face of Christ". During such séances, attended by the poet, Hasdeu was inspired to build his folly castle in Câmpina, where he later displayed a group photograph of Lecca, Rosetti and Ovid Densusianu. In January 1899, when Hasdeu created his "Society of the Press", a pioneering writers' syndicate, Lecca, Ascanio and Chendi were among the founding members.

Being heavily indebted to Hermann Sudermann, Lecca published his first work in drama, Bianca, which showed moral dilemmas leading to a mariticide. It saw print in Ascanio's magazine (1896), being followed in 1897 by a five-act play, Pentru o femeie ("For a Woman", 1897), presented for review to the National Theatre Bucharest (1897). He was also interested in translating foreign drama, and printed in Convorbiri Literare his version of William Shakespeare's Taming of the Shrew, followed by Victor Hugo's Hernani, which was used by the National Theater in the 1898 repertoire. Also then, he adapted The Pillars of Society. In 1896, he began his relationship with actress Aristizza Romanescu, who, as Rosetti writes, was also his artistic muse for the following decade.

=== Rise to fame ===
Lecca became a staff dramaturge for the National Theater by 1900, and, according to actor Petre I. Sturdza, was superlative as a translator of verse drama, though "not so much of a poet". In May 1900, the satirical poet Vasile Dumbrăveanu referred to him as a "loser", noting that he was driving the National Theater into debt. The Convorbiri Literare editors—and ultimately their literary society, Junimea—came to regard Lecca as an occasional ally, despite his debut with their rival Hasdeu. In the same magazine, Dumitru Evolceanu published in 1896 an essay which gave appreciation to Lecca as a poet, but his verdicts were ridiculed by fellow Junimist Duiliu Zamfirescu. Eventually, Lecca remained with the ideologically incompatible Literatură și Artă Română, as its "playwright par excellence", then with its partial successor, Revista Idealistă.

"The most productive auteur of the time", he produced a long string of plays: Tertia. Casta diva ("Tertia. Chaste Goddess", 1899); Quarta. Jucătoriĭ de cărțĭ ("Quarta. Card Players", 1900); Quinta. Suprema forță ("Quinta. The Force Supreme", 1901); Septima. Câiniĭ ("Septima. The Dogs", 1902); Cancer la inimă ("Cancer of the Heart", 1903). Another work, published in 1904 (and again in 1905), was titled I.N.R.I—sometimes described as a poem, it is in fact a Gospel-themed scenario, and features his "spiteful address to mankind". According to literary historian Mircea Popa, the series contains little of artistic value, featuring characters with unclear psychological states and plots not always sufficiently endowed with motive. His actor friend Livescu nevertheless recalled that they enjoyed success at the National Theater, in particular Quarta, which starred Aristide Demetriade and "included no banalities or filler". Upon rediscovering the play in 1933, critic Barbu Lăzăreanu upheld Lecca as the "master of incisiveness"—Quarta's second act is almost entirely constructed from quick exchanges around the poker table. Similarly, the impresario M. Faust-Mohr reminisces that Quarta and Quinta were commercial hits on their first staging. The latter, contrasting a cynical seducer to an idealistic lady, won Lecca another Adamachi award, in 1901. Hoping for international success since at least 1900, Lecca had the play translated into Hungarian and French.

Many of the plays veered from social into political commentary, progressively influenced by the schools of naturalism and social theater. Livescu also notes that Lecca's preferred method included "savaging our social forms and flagellating our lack of character [...] within a melancholy atmosphere, sometimes depressing, sometimes carried by discreet poetry". In 1902, he contributed such criticism in an unprecedented form, at a National Theater recital given by Romanescu and Constantin Nottara: he added to Heliade's classic poem, Zburătorul, lyrics of his own, with political hints. Already by Quinta, Lecca, who directed his own plays (with "taste and mastery of scenography", according to Livescu), had stabilized his preferred team of actors, which included Demetriade, Livescu, Romanescu, and Nottara. Another actor, Velimir Maximilan, worked with Romanescu and Lecca ca. 1907, recalling that the latter was "treasured for his techniques in drama".

Iorga found his a literature about "parasitism" and "disgusting gentlemen", with little relevancy for people living in later times. The settings were "vague and false", evoking the worst of Liviu Rebreanu. However, Iorga also notes Lecca stood out in this family of dramatists in the "French fashion" for his "savvy web of movements and dialogues". The same was also noted by novelist Felix Aderca, who saw Lecca as an industrious and "profoundly different from his peers", but noted that he nonetheless failed at his main project: dramatizing the rise of an industrial, urbanized, Romanian aristocracy. Although she recognizes his skill, Florea cautions that his success was conditioned by him having this prestigious troupe at his disposal, as well as by an "emptiness" in Romanian drama of the fin de siècle. She notes that Lecca had not created either situations or types, but that, as a "fine connoisseur of the stage", he was able to dose conflict, and usually resolved it in tragedy; the social critique is "vehement, but lacks clarity." As Faust-Mohr notes, "some theater reviewers and some in the public were disappointed by the resolution of [Quarta]: a father killing his son, who had been driven astray by gambling addiction." Septima was a topic of controversy "with the crudeness one finds in some of its scenes." It "showed the adulating intriguer sponging off a politician, and wasting no time in denouncing him once his star has waned." Cancer la inimă was laughed at for its morbid title, although, Mora claims, its critics "never seemed to have the time, not the skill, to analyze [it]".

=== 1900s scandals ===
Around 1900, Lecca was under contract with Alcaly publishers and was coordinating their Biblioteca pentru toți, a serial for the popularization of foreign and domestic literature. His own literary work had diversified, and came to be hosted in such venues as Flacăra, Noua Revistă Română, Viața Romînească, Viața Literară, and Falanga, sometimes signed with the pen name Câmpeanu. From 1903, he joined Livescu as a contributor to Revista Theatrelor, a magazine published for the community of stage actors and theatergoers, later followed by similar contributions in Rampa and Scena. From 1905, his brother was marginally affiliated with the Romanian Symbolist movement, writing for Vieața Nouă, whose editor, Ovid Densusianu, called Haralamb "the most artistic of the younger poets". Lecca, however, kept away from the literary clubs, and especially the coffeehouses, and was perceived as bitter or glacial—but, according to friend N. I. Apostolescu, was in fact moved "by all of life's misery, injustice, and pettiness".

Lecca had quarrels with critic Mihail Dragomirescu, who maintained that he was a nonentity (although he conceded that Lecca wrote good dialogue). His staunchest defenders include Apostolescu, who analyzed Lecca in studies of comparative literature, and dramatist Victor Anestin, who proclaimed (controversially so) that Lecca stood above Ion Luca Caragiale. In 1902, the Symbolist doyen Alexandru Macedonski reported that Caragiale saw his cousin as culturally irrelevant, deeming his plays as "attempts, but not literature." According to Florea: "A strange figure, interesting for its epoch, regarded as an arbiter of elegance, 'the man of extremities and extremes', [...] Haralamb Lecca [was] either indignantly repelled or eulogized, with sympathies and antipathies bearing the same seal of disproportionate partiality."

Driven by material needs and his pedagogical principles, the writer, using the pseudonym "Sybil", took up roles in his own plays—although, Livescu recalls, "he had no talent for this". In 1903, he toured Oltenia as the protagonist of his Septima, and, for a while in 1905, was stage director of the National Theater Craiova. While there, he reportedly got into a brawl with a troupe member, Petre Locusteanu, whom he even provoked to a duel. As a protégé of the influential politician Vasile Morțun, he was simultaneously stage director of the Iași National Theatre, producing his own Quinta. According to philologist Remus Zăstroiu, his role there was "not at all negligible", but rather contributed to an interval of "artistic fulfillment." As "one of the most competent men of the stage", Lecca undertook "to modernize the program and reform acting techniques." The same was also noted by actress Maria Filotti (discovered and employed by Lecca), who summarized his tenure as "short [but] productive". However, he was also ruthless and "almost brutally sincere" with his employees and, as noted by Sturdza, who toured with the company, "pointlessly insulted [my] comrades." According to the local daily Opinia, "stubborn" Lecca tried to pressure theatergoers into accepting Romanian plays, which they constantly rejected. He also exaggerated in his method acting requirements, which notoriously included disposing of prompts, being ultimately forced to resign in December 1906.

Immediately after, Velimir Maximilian employed Lecca at the Grigoriu Association, an independent troupe. In February 1907, he toured the country alongside Romanescu, reaching his native Caracal. Lecca's rendition from Franz Grillparzer's Hero and Leander, appearing in Issue 270 of Biblioteca pentru toți (1907), was probably done from a French intermediary. Other such contributions followed, with works by: Shakespeare (Romeo and Juliet, 1907), Théodore de Banville (The Kiss, 1907), Jean Racine (Athalie, 1907), Pierre Beaumarchais (Barber of Seville, 1908), Pierre Corneille (Horace, 1912), and Molière (Tartuffe, 1913). Reprinted throughout the 1910s, these works earned accolades from Albert Honigman of Universul Literar, who believed that Lecca, an "intelligent poet", had "outstanding talent in translation arts"; Aderca found them "mediocre", while literary historian Barbu Theodorescu noted their "multitude of errors" and their "hasty weakness".

Having obtained a government position as deputy director of theaters, then also inspector general of theaters, Lecca was highly unpopular. During Easter 1908, with an article in Ordinea, he asked his readers "what they would do if Christ returned"; "Coco" Ranetti, a satirist at Furnica, responded for them: "I'd urgently get you sacked from the theaters". He was finally relieved of his position when disgruntled actors, who knew him since his days at Iași Theater, expressed their opposition. Subsequently, Lecca was also one of the writers commissioned to translate for the National Theater by its chairman, Pompiliu Eliade, who used his version of Dumas-fils' L'Étrangère. In 1908, his translation of La Femme de Claude, by the same Dumas, was modified by the managers, and, after his public protest, was pulled out of rehearsal.

=== Marginalization and return ===
Lecca's threat to Eliade, that he would no longer allow his own work to be performed in Bucharest, was taken seriously by its recipient, who effectively banned him from setting foot the National Theater. However he was again employed in December, when he prepared a stage version of Arthur Conan Doyle's Final Problem, published as a book in 1915. Over the following months, Lecca also pursued engagements abroad, his Quinta taken up by Italia Vitaliani's troupe in Florence (March 1909). Although Lecca and the Romanian press claimed it was a hit, critic Mario Ferrigni called it "useless and absurd torture", concluding that Lecca was "one giant prankster". At around that time, Septima was performed at the National Theater Sofia, Kingdom of Bulgaria, opening to poor reviews in Savremenik magazine.

His other translation work, published independently, covered prose: in 1904, texts by Camille Flammarion; in 1908, Maurice Maeterlinck's Intelligence of Flowers, Guy de Maupassant's Une vie, Henryk Sienkiewicz's Quo Vadis and Hermann Sudermann's Tale of the Idle Millstone; in 1909, book two of Gulliver's Travels. The same year, he joined the Romanian Writers' Society, then under the presidency of Mihail Sadoveanu. He also put out his translation of Boule de Suif, much criticized by Mihai Codreanu for failing to render Maupassant's meanings and turns of phrase, a "perseverance in bad translation."

At around that time, Lecca married Natalia Botezat, with whom he lived for a while in Bârlad. His move there was announced on July 13, 1911. That year, Lecca rendered into Romanian Jules Verne's Around the World in Eighty Days, while his earlier work inspired Zicu Araia, who adapted his Romanian Enoch Arden into Aromanian. Returning the same year with the retrospective Poezii ("Poems"), he was described by Viața Romînească as having "some skill", as opposed to his generation colleague, Rosetti, who was "untalented". They both were prominently featured by Luceafărul, which, the chronicler noted, was "exaggerated" for poets of such status. Facla, the more left-wing Symbolist review, was more categorical, describing Lecca as "overreaching and trite".

Lecca also contributed the political essays and conferences in Noi, Românii ("Us Romanians"), where he attacked the mores and psychology of his era. Lecca pined for what he saw as better days, referring to the cultural work of Hasdeu, George Ionescu-Gion, and psychologist Nicolae Vaschide, whose work he introduced for the public. In part written as a satire, Noi, Românii attacked particular social groups: Transylvanian immigrants, for "posing as martyrs" and "bit by bit [...] form[ing] their own state within the state"; state employees, for being "somnolent" and interested in social gatherings more than actual work; and amateur actors, for "dishonor[ing] the work" of professionals. His hostility for amateurs was shared by Livescu, who notes that Quarta was being "mutilated" by a company in Pitești, which reduced the number of roles from "a great number" to "seven–nine".

Such fragmentary memoirs, admired by Florea for their "moving portrayal of Hasdeu", were nevertheless dismissed in 1913 by chronicler Spiru Hasnaș, who found them "monotonous". Lecca also wrote short stories, collected as Crăngi ("Branches", 1914), and episodes from the life of Napoleon Bonaparte. As noted by Florea, they are prose poems and, in this, inferior to his regular poetry, "without any literary interest other than—to a certain degree—a stylistic interest." Although he had largely given up on poetry, he was still noted as an author in the epigram genre, for instance ridiculing the state of public transport in Bucharest.

Under contract with Alexandru Davila, who managed a private company of actors, he acted in his versions of La Femme de Claude, and Henri Bernstein's Le Détour. Reviewing the latter for Adevărul, Emil Fagure argued that Lecca (billed as "Câmpinaru") was "very witty" in his portrayal of Cyrill, who "fits him wonderfully." He also began working with actress and manager Marioara Voiculescu, translating for her Leopold Kampf's On the Eve. In October 1912, Lecca appeared in Romain Coolus' Cœur à cœur, though, according to reviewer Al. Cobuz, he only provoked unintentional laughter: "his voice was coarse and not modulated, his gesturing abrupt and rough." The two directors had already had a major row over Filotti's contract, and the collaboration between them did not last long, with Davila becoming one of Lecca's "violent critics".

=== Wartime, illness, and death ===
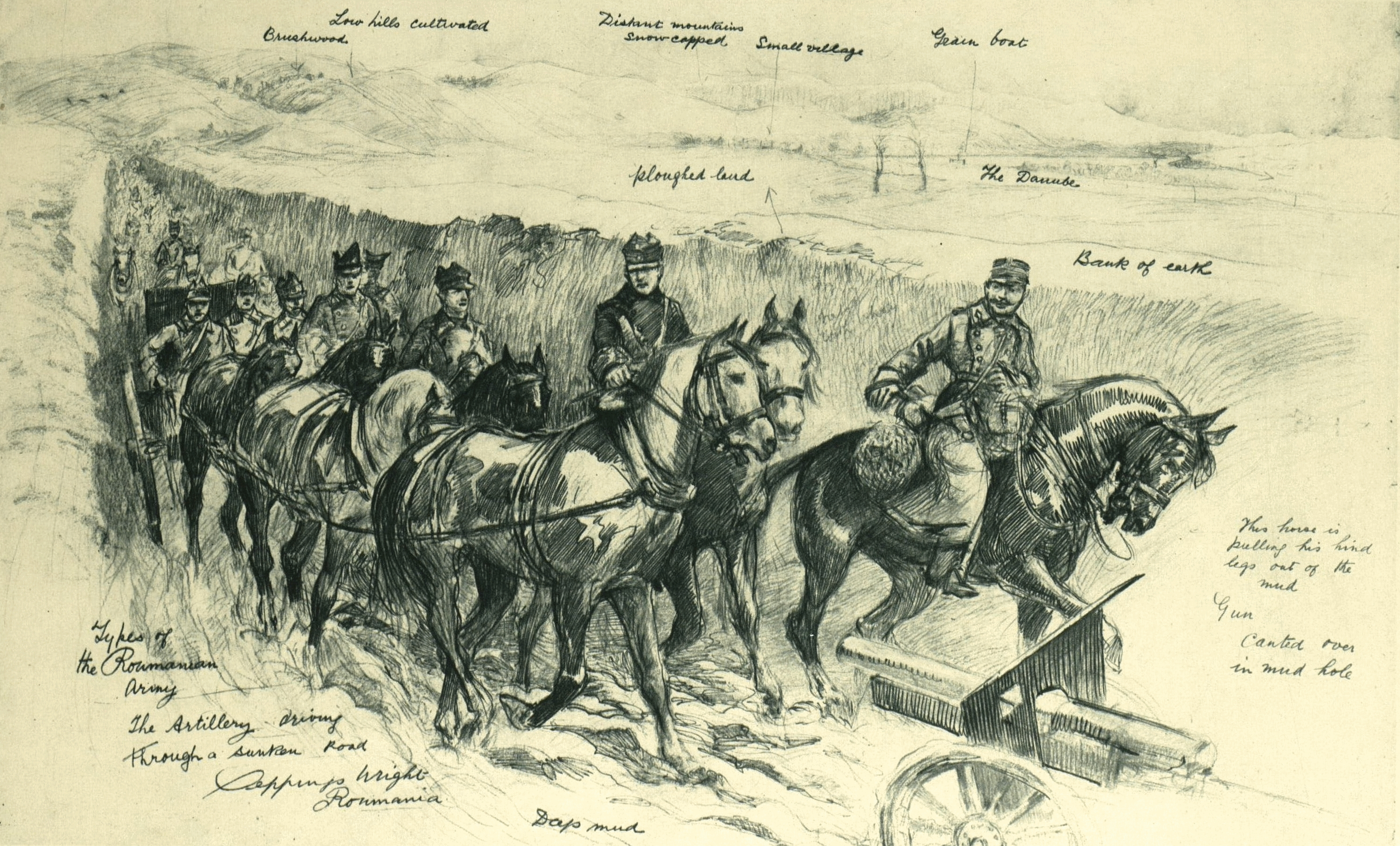
Romanian artillery during the 1916 campaigns (drawing by H. C. Seppings-Wright, The Illustrated London News)

Ahead of the Balkan Wars, Lecca was recalled into active service at Bucharest Arsenal, then eventually under arms. He participated in the 1913 expedition to Bulgaria, and published a memoir of his experience—this was strange, according to Iorga: "few expected [Lecca] to be interested in such topics". Titled Dincolo ("Beyond"), it was dismissed with a pun by Opinia: "Sure enough, talent is beyond the scope of Mr Lecca's work." By then, interested in the emerging Romanian school of cinema, had also been working on a screenplay the "peasant drama" Răzbunarea ("Revenge"). The eponymous film, produced by Leon Popescu and starring Voiculescu, premiered upon Lecca's return to Bucharest, in June 1913. A scandal ensued, when Mihail Sorbul of Seara noticed that Lecca had plagiarized from his recently deceased uncle, Caragiale, rehashing Năpasta with only minor changes of names and settings. Together, Lecca and Voiculescu wrote a film version of Fédora, first shown in a private screening around the same time as Răzbunarea—postponed by Popescu's furious withdrawal from the project, its release came in 1915.

In 1914, Lecca published versions of Père Goriot by Honoré de Balzac and Jack by Alphonse Daudet, as well as working on Giovanni Boccaccio's Decameron (published after his death, in 1926). Around 1915, he released another work in drama, Zece monologuri ("Ten Monologues"). He returned to the National Theater Bucharest, where Tertia was again performed that year, while also working on staging and adapting Ilderim, by Carmen Sylva and Victor Eftimiu (premiered March 1916). In July 1916, shortly before Romania's declaration of war, he ran for the presidency of the Writers' Union, but lost to his old Junimea rival, Duiliu Zamfirescu.

Subsequently, during the campaigns of World War I, Lecca was a Captain of the Ammunition Department in the 22nd Division, which withdrew with the rest of the army into Western Moldavia. Also during that interval, a revue of his, Dandanaua ("The Mishap") was being staged by Maximilian in German-occupied Bucharest—it was cancelled after reports that it was mocking the occupiers. While recovering at Podu Iloaiei in winter 1916, Lecca showed signs of a debilitating illness (sometimes described as a war injury), confessing to Ludovic Dauș that he was slowly dying, but still hoping to find a miracle cure. Decommissioned in summer 1917, he was living in Iași, with Natalia Lecca as his nurse. Among his last works was another volume of poetry, Simpla ("The Simple One"). Almost completely paralyzed in 1918, he continued to be conscious and responsive although, as Iorgulescu recalls, he was socially dead.

Upon the end of the war, his writing was no longer considered relevant. As poet and critic Benjamin Fondane argued in 1921: "It took Haralamb Lecca ten years to realize how much his art was fake." While a noted influence on comedies by A. de Herz, Lecca was, according to Florea, "forgotten even before he stopped writing"—this, "even though the history of Romanian drama at that particular moment cannot abstract him. [...] Lecca's writing for the stage opened the way for urban-themed drama." He died on March 9, 1920, at his home in Bucharest (on Strada Suvenir, No 9); his brother Octav was present. He was buried at Bellu Cemetery, in Plot 92b, with no cultural official on show. By the 1930s, his tomb was untended, the marble plaque on it having cracked.

== Legacy ==
In 1933, at Caracal, Lecca's fellow citizens put up his bust, sculpted by Ioan C. Dimitriu-Bârlad. This reverence contrasted with his posthumous decline in literary importance. Sturdza argued that, "of all that Lecca wrote—in verse and drama—, and he wrote a lot for his day, today [in 1940] nothing endures, not even in the memory of his own generation." In 1921, his rendition of Hero and Leander, at Regina Maria Theater, played to an "almost empty" venue, despite starring Tony Bulandra. Quinta, also at Regina Maria (with Bulandra and wife Lucia Sturdza), still enjoyed success and, critic Paul I. Prodan noted, would still be relevant "for as long as social laws remain the same." According to Aderca, it was still well-liked only because "tearjerkers and lampoons [...] always will enjoy great success among the masses." Lecca, he notes, had "the prestige of the recently deceased". Also in the 1920s, an attempt to stage I.N.R.I failed, due to opposition from both the Romanian Orthodox Church (who found it blasphemous) and critics such as Garabet Ibrăileanu (who raised aesthetic objections). Mora claimed in 1929 that "the time shall come for the work of Haralamb Lecca [...] to impose itself".

In 1930, Rosetti also proposed that Lecca's plays be revived "with today's actors, costumes, techniques", and that Casta-Diva be reprised by the Bucharest National Theater. As noted in 1936 by playwright Mihail Sebastian, plays by Lecca and Emil Nicolau had been revived and were routinely staged by Bucharest theaters. This lack of comparable, more recent, plays, meant that Lecca was "a classic against his will." In a 1942 column, writer Alexandru Kirițescu suggested that Ioana, one of Dauș's newer works for the stage, was needlessly prolonging Lecca's brand of "salon drama", a genre that "requires neither observational skill nor wit".
