= Ion Brezeanu =

Romanian stage actor (1869–1940)

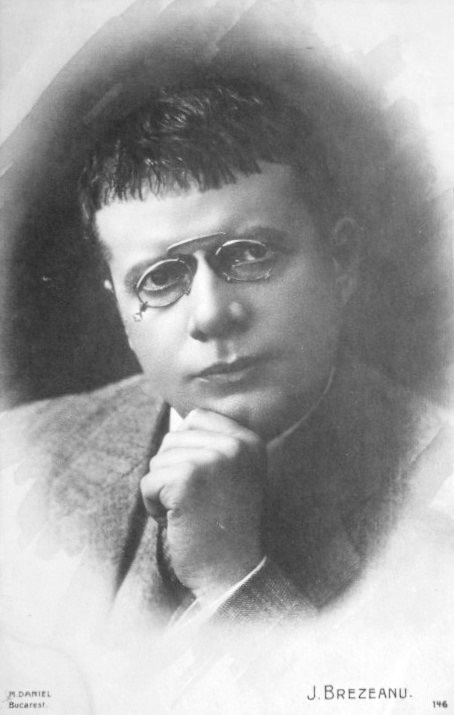
Ion Brezeanu, postcard

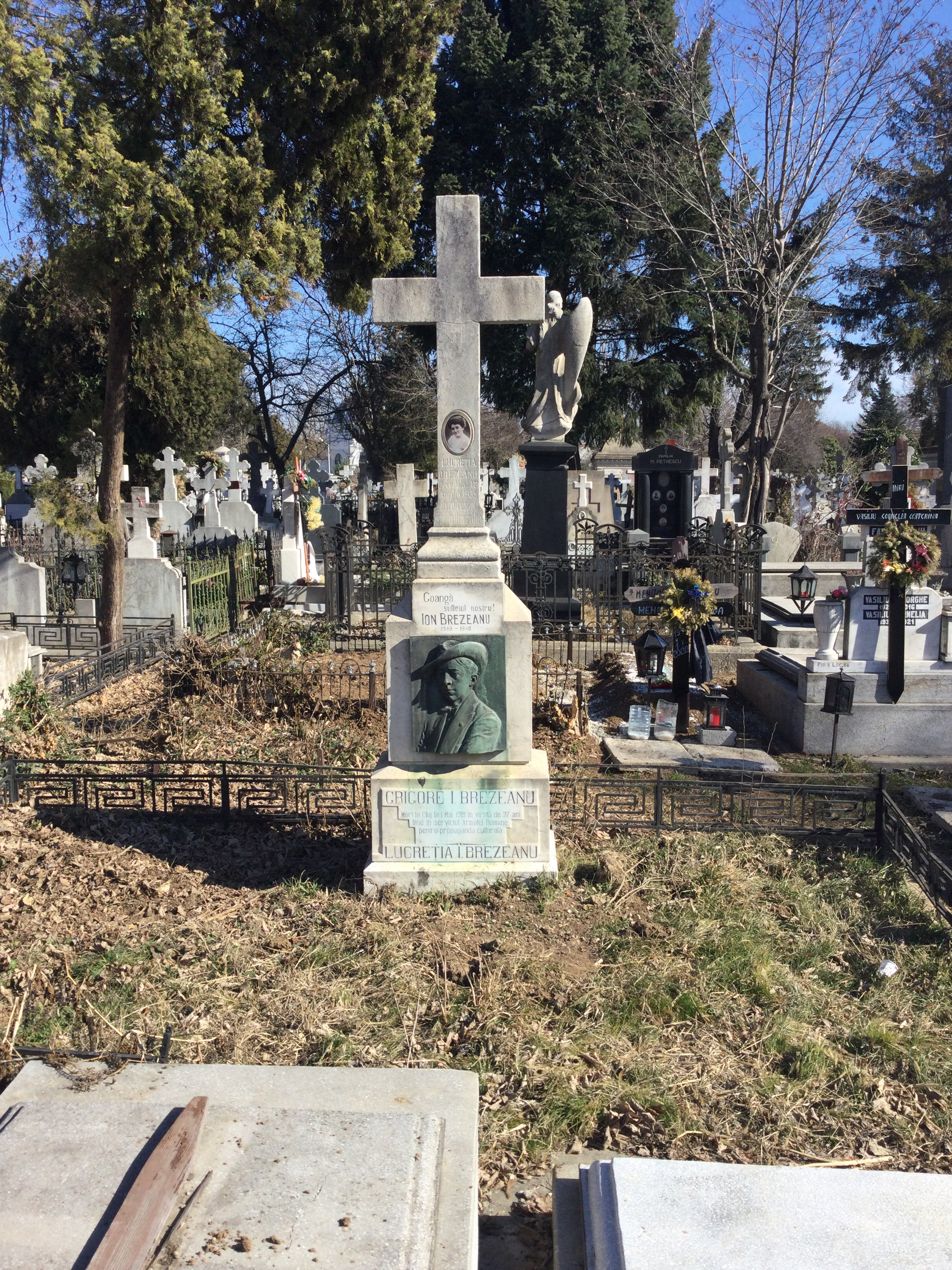
Grave at Sfânta Vineri Cemetery

Ion or Iancu Brezeanu (December 1, 1869–March 17, 1940) was a Romanian stage actor.

His jovial figure made Brezeanu ideal for comedic roles, above all in the works of Ion Luca Caragiale, whose favorite he was. In 1888, while still a student at the Bucharest Conservatory under Ștefan Vellescu, he appeared in O noapte furtunoasă. In 1898, Caragiale himself directed Brezeanu in O scrisoare pierdută, where he would appear for nearly four decades. The playwright then analyzed his actor's performance in a noted critical study.

From 1906, at the request of Alexandru Davila, he played the tragic figure of Ion in Caragiale's Năpasta. Constantin I. Nottara, who had inaugurated the role in 1890, willingly ceded it to the younger man. In all, Brezeanu interpreted nearly 200 roles, including Mogâldici from Viforul and Luceafărul by Barbu Ștefănescu Delavrancea (1909, 1910), the Fool in William Shakespeare’s King Lear (1910) and Șbilț from Mihail Sorbul’s Patima roșie (1916). In 1924, his Shylock, in Shakespeare’s Merchant of Venice, drew favorable comparisons to Ermete Novelli‘s portrayal. He also played Harpagon in The Miser by Molière and the Mayor in The Government Inspector by Nikolai Gogol, the latter evoking a favorable review in 1909 from N. D. Cocea.

Aged 70, he died of gangrene in a foot, brought on by diabetes. His son was the early film director Grigore Brezeanu.
