= Petre Liciu =

Romanian stage actor (1871–1912)

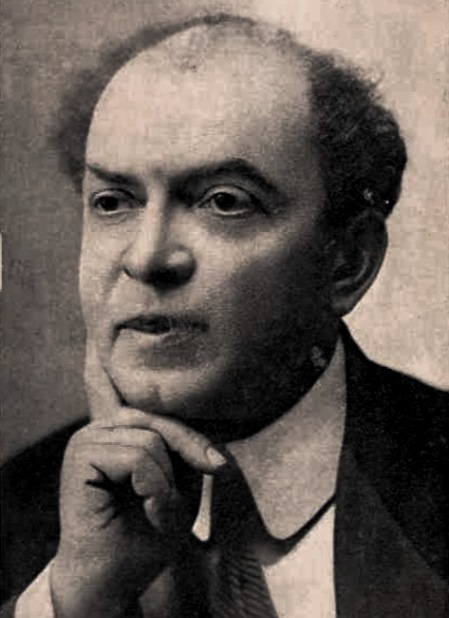
Liciu late in life

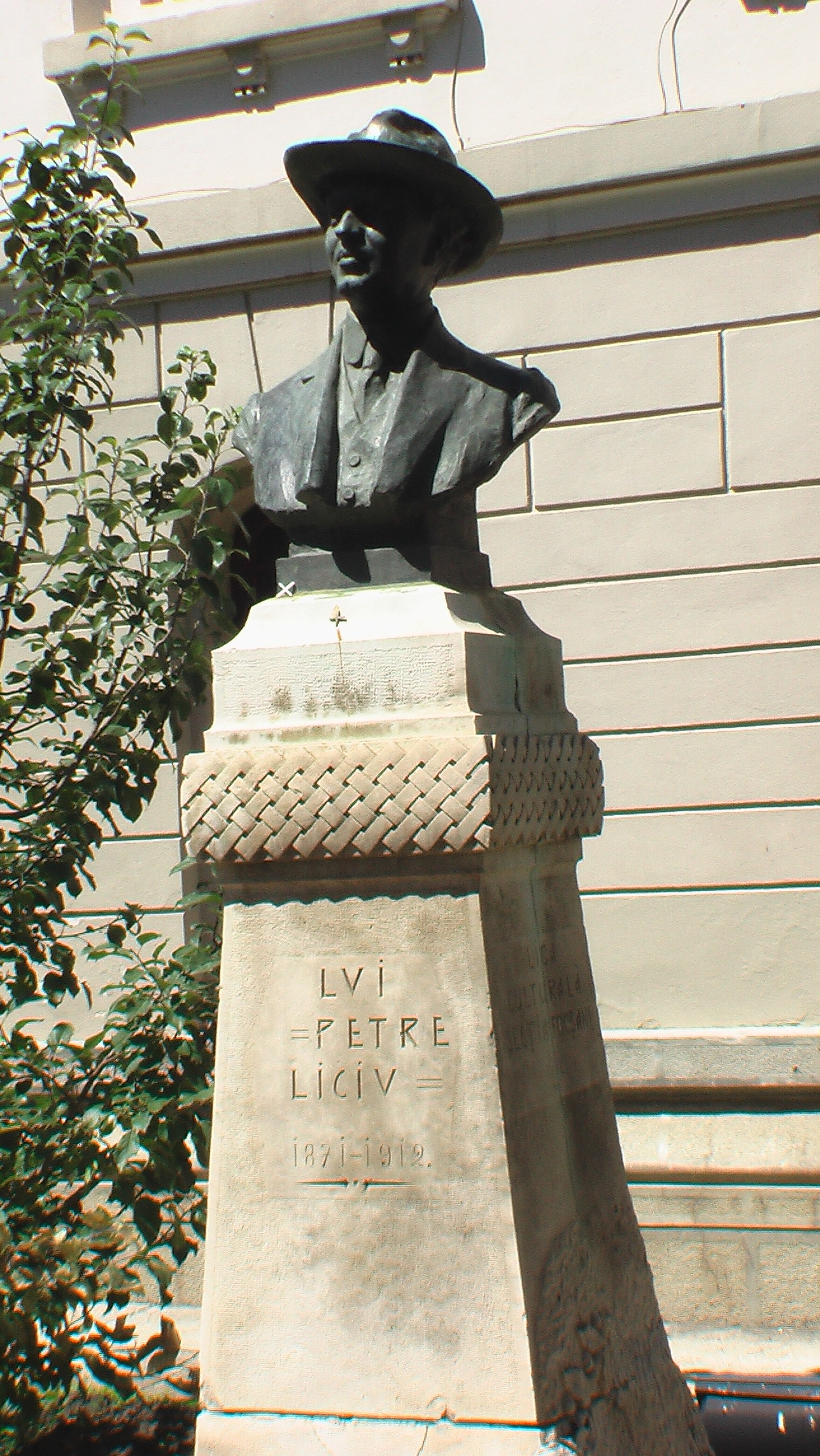
Bust of Liciu in Focșani

Petre Liciu (March 19, 1871–April 1, 1912) was a Romanian stage actor.

Born in Focșani, Liciu was the second of ten children. His mother died young, while his father, a magistrate, frequently moved the family as work dictated. In 1883, Liciu entered the National High School in Iași, where he was an excellent student, graduating in 1888. He was classmates with Nicolae Iorga; their initial academic rivalry turned into a lifelong friendship.

Liciu briefly worked at the Iași National Theatre before being hired by the National Theatre Bucharest in 1892. He found the theatre in disarray: the early death of Grigore Manolescu had cast a pall, the public was avoiding shows, the aged leadership was unable to cope. It was Liciu who, while still studying at the Bucharest Conservatory under Ștefan Vellescu, began to introduce invigorating reforms. A particular target of his was the system that typecast actors into rigid roles, inhibiting their diversification and development. Liciu himself led the way, ranging from farce and vaudeville to drama and tragedy, creating a unique persona for each role.

Liciu's portrayals included Rică Venturiano in Ion Luca Caragiale’s O noapte furtunoasă and the Citizen in his O scrisoare pierdută, Shylock in William Shakespeare’s Merchant of Venice, Ștefăniță in Viforul by Barbu Ștefănescu Delavrancea, Isidore Lechat in Les affaires sont les affaires by Octave Mirbeau, Khlestakov in The Government Inspector by Nikolai Gogol, Tokeramo in Melchior Lengyel’s Typhoon and Zeilig Șor in Manasse by Ronetti Roman.

Also a director and a professor at the Conservatory, he trained a new generation of prominent actors, including Ion Manolescu, Velimir Maximilian, Maria Filotti, Zaharia Bârsan and Marioara Voiculescu. Among those who gave him favorable reviews were N. D. Cocea and Garabet Ibrăileanu.

In autumn 1911, Liciu developed nephritis; he would die of the disease the following spring, shortly after turning 41. Four years later, a bust of the actor was unveiled before the Maior Gheorghe Pastia Municipal Theatre in his hometown; it was Romania’s first statue of an actor in a public square.
