= Ștefan Vellescu =

Romanian stage actor and drama teacher

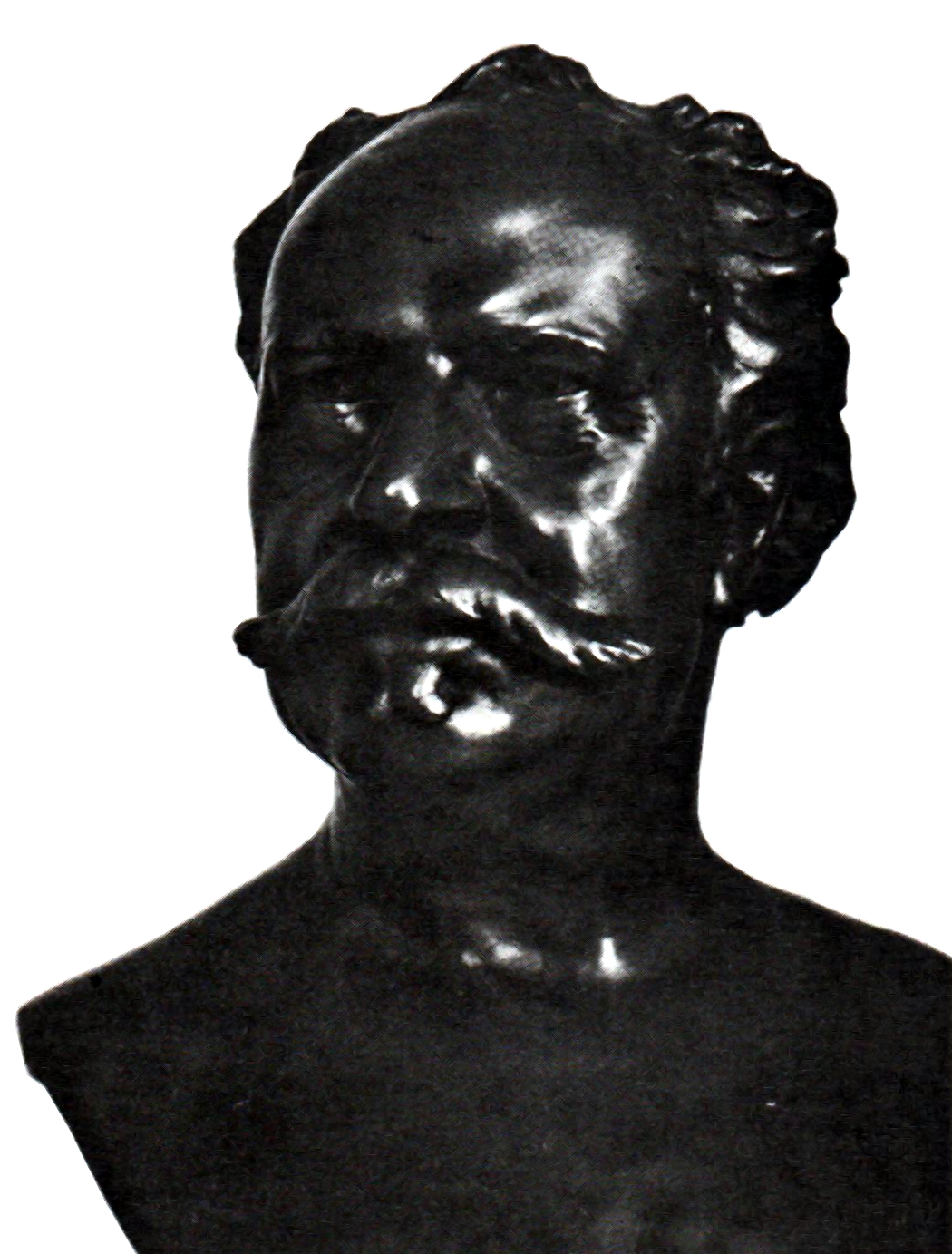
Bust by Dimitrie Paciurea

Ștefan Vellescu (December 24, 1838 – October 2, 1899) was a Romanian stage actor and drama teacher.

Born in Craiova, he ran away from school at age 16, joining the local troupe of Costache Mihăileanu. Removed thence by his family and sent to continue his education in Bucharest, he again fled shortly afterward, appearing in minor theatrical roles. He then joined Matei Millo’s troupe at Sala Bossel. Four years later, Vellescu entered Elena Theodorini’s company at Craiova, earning plaudits in roles from Caterina Howard (Errico Petrella), La Dame aux Camélias (Alexandre Dumas fils), Othello (William Shakespeare) and Les Filles de marbre (Théodore Barrière), as well as playing the lead in Alfred de Vigny’s Chatterton.

Vellescu then returned to Bucharest, subsequently moving to Iași, where he played in Don César de Bazan (Jules Massenet) and The Barber of Seville (Pierre Beaumarchais). Briefly stopping in Bucharest again, he played the title role in V. A. Urechia’s Vornicul Bucioc. In 1867, sent by Urechia, he left for Paris, studying drama under François-Joseph Regnier. Three years later, he returned to the stage, distinguishing himself in Le Supplice d'une femme (Dumas fils), King John (Shakespeare) and Le gamin de Paris (Jean-François Bayard), the latter in 1877.

In 1873, Vellescu was named professor of declamation at the Bucharest Conservatory, where his students included Grigore Manolescu, Constantin I. Nottara and Ion Brezeanu. Among his publications are Istoria artei dramatice in Revista românească and Curs de declamațiune in Revista literară, as well as criticism. He wrote several dramas and comedies that appeared at the National Theatre Bucharest, where he was assistant director: Lăpușneanul, Banul Craiovei, Prea târziu, Mincinosul (in which Aristizza Romanescu played), Blond sau Brun and Hagi-Bina. He authored several poems and short stories, including “Din Florești”, “Moș Tudor” and “Schițe din viața contimporană”. He served on the Bucharest City Council and, from 1890 to 1895, was employed by the vital records division.
