= Independența României =

1912 Romanian silent film

Independenţa României
- Directed by: Aristide Demetriade; Military advisors
- Written by: Petre Liciu; Aristide Demetriade; Constantin I. Nottara
- Produced by: Leon Popescu; Grigore Brezeanu; Members of the TNB Society; Pascal Vidraşcu
- Starring: Ar. Demetriade; C. Demetriade; Constantin I. Nottara; A. Athanasescu; J. Metaxa-Doro
- Cinematography: Frank Daniau-Johnston and/or Indigues
- Edited by: Aristide Demetriade
- Distributed by: Societatea Filmul de Artă Leon Popescu
- Release date: 1 September 1912
- Running time: 120 min (later 90 or 75 min)
- Country: Romania
- Languages: Silent; Romanian intertitles
- Budget: 400,000 lei

Independenţa României ("The Independence of Romania"), subtitled The Romanian-Russo-Turkish War 1877, is a Romanian 1912 silent film directed by Aristide Demetriade.

== Beginnings ==
In December 1911, the theatrical magazine Rampa published a note under the heading The Cinema in the Theatre (signed by V. Scânteie) indicating that "The Maestro Nottara is in the course of making a patriotic work re-creating the Romanian War of Independence on film, so that today's generations might learn the story of the battles of 1877, and for future generations a live tableau of Romanian bravery will remain".

As a result, the director of the Bucharest branch of the Gaumont-Paris studio, Raymond Pellerin, announced the premiere of his film Războiul din 1877-1878 (The 1877-1878 War), scheduled for 29 December 1911. A "film" made in haste, with a troupe of second-hand actors and with the help of General Constantinescu, who commanded a division at Piteşti, from whom he had obtained the extras needed for the war scenes, "Războiul din 1877-1878" was screened a day before by the prefect of the capital's police, who decided that it did not correspond with historic fact. Consequently, the film was confiscated and destroyed, Raymond Pellerin was declared persona non grata and he left for Paris, while the "collaborationist" general saw himself moved to another garrison as a means of discipline.

== Production ==
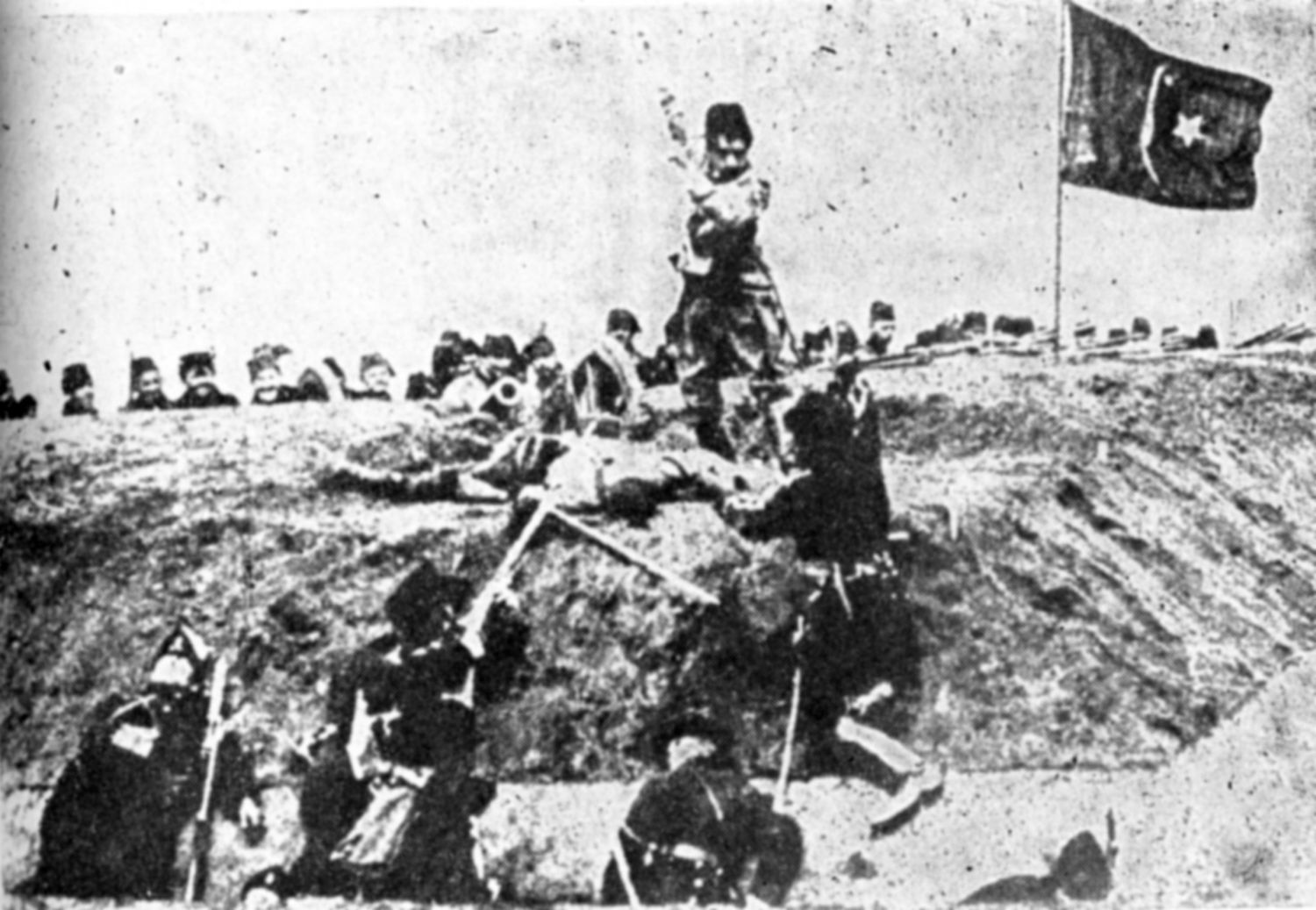
Image from the movie (Capturing Plevna)

On 5 May 1912, the magazine Flacăra (The Flame) brought to its readers' attention the fact that "as it is known, a few artists have founded a society with the goal of producing a film about the War of Independence... Such an undertaking deserves to be applauded".

The initiators were a group of actors: Constantin I. Nottara, Aristide Demetriade, V. Toneanu, I. Brezeanu, N. Soreanu, P. Liciu, as well as the young Grigore Brezeanu, associate producer and the creative force behind the whole operation. Since a large amount of money was needed for the production, they also brought into this effort Leon Popescu, a wealthy man and owner of the Lyric Theatre. The group received strong backing from government authorities, with the army and all necessary equipment being placed at its disposal, plus military advisers (possibly including Pascal Vidraşcu). The cameras and their operators were brought from abroad, and the print was prepared in Parisian laboratories. Could Grigore Brezeanu have been the film's director? No source from that time gives credence to such a hypothesis. On the contrary, they present him as "initiator", producer of the film, beside members of the National Theatre and Leon Popescu. Furthermore, it appears that it was he who attracted the financier of the entire undertaking.

In 1985, the film critic Tudor Caranfil discovered among Aristide Demetriade's papers his director's notebooks for Independenţa României, unequivocally confirming that he was the film's director. Thus, the film's production crew was as follows:

- Producers: Leon Popescu, Aristide Demetriade, Grigore Brezeanu, Constantin Nottara, Pascal Vidraşcu
- Screenwriters: Petre Liciu, Constantin Nottara, Aristide Demetriade, Corneliu Moldoveanu.
- Director: Aristide Demetriade
- Cinematographer: Franck Daniau
- Makeup and hairstylist: Pepi Machauer

== Plot ==
The film depicts the events of the Russo-Turkish War (1877–1878), which led to independence for Romania.

== Premiere ==
On September 2 1912, at the Eforie cinema, the largest movie theatre in Bucharest at the time, the premiere of Independenţa României took place. Despite its shortcomings regarding the theatrical game of the actors, in which the errors of an army of extras uncontrolled by direction provoked unintended laughter in some scenes and rendered dramatically limp those of the beginning, the film was well received by spectators, being shown for several weeks. Through this, the dimensions of its theme, the distribution method chosen, the artistic intentions and its professional editing for the time, the creation of this film can be considered Romania's first step in the art of cinematography.

== Aftermath ==
And yet he who had realized this work, the man who kept the whole team together, the theatre director Grigore Brezeanu, was left disappointed. The press of the time made ostentatious mention of Leon Popescu, who financed the film and made sure to distance the other financiers, buying their part; no such praise was heaped on the artistic makers of the film. This caused producer Grigore Brezeanu to say in an interview given to the magazine "Rampa" and published on 13 April 1913: "My dream would have been to build a large film studio. I have come to believe that this is impossible. First of all, we are missing a large capital investment. Without money we cannot rival the foreign studios...A studio, according to our financiers, is something outside art, something in the realm of agriculture or the C.F.R. Hence I have abandoned this dream with great regret."

== Bibliography ==
- Caranfil, Tudor, În căutarea filmului pierdut, Ed. Meridiane, Bucharest, 1988
- Caranfil, Tudor, Vârstele peliculei”, Ed. Meridiane, Bucharest, 1984
- Căliman, Călin, Istoria filmului românesc 1897 - 2000, Ed. Fundaţiei Culturale Române, Bucharest, 2000
- Gheorghiu-Cernat, Manuela, Filmul şi armele, Ed. Meridiane, Bucharest, 1983
- Mihail, Jean, Filmul românesc de altădată, Ed. Meridiane, Bucharest, 1967
- Contribuţii la istoria cinematografiei în România. 1896 * 1948, Ed. Academiei R.S.R., Bucharest, 1971
