= Mihail Sorbul =

Romanian playwright and novelist

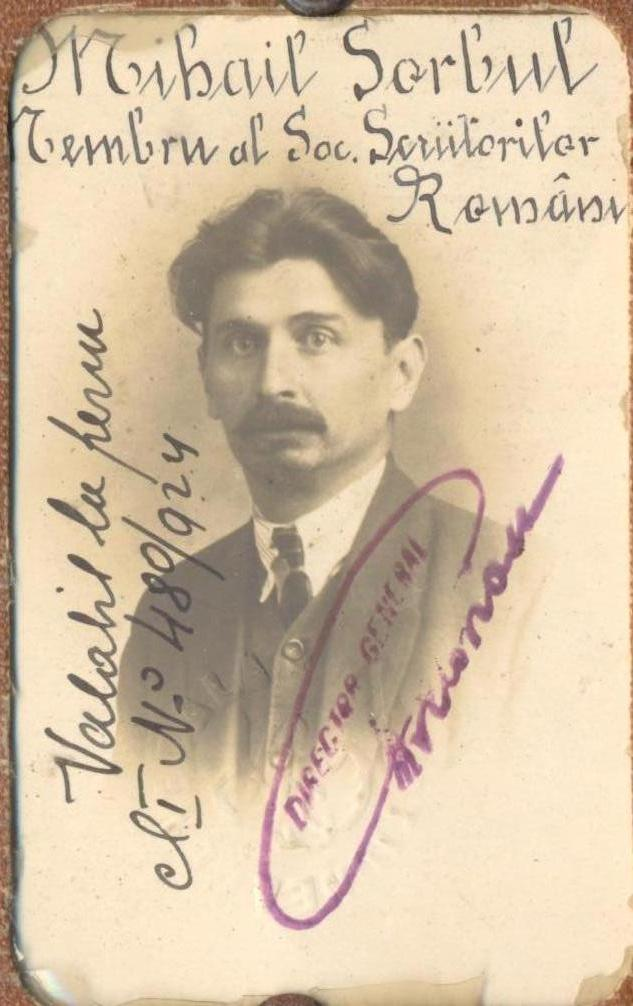
Mihail Sorbul

Mihail Sorbul (pen name of Mihail Smolsky; October 16 (or 19), 1885 – December 20, 1966) was a Romanian playwright and novelist.

Born in Botoșani, his parents were Anton Smolsky, a Polish uhlan lieutenant, later a shareholder in a petroleum company, and his wife Maria (née Moscovici). He attended high school in Iași, Ploiești, and Bucharest, graduating in 1905. From 1905 to 1906, he briefly took courses at the law faculty of the University of Bucharest, followed by Constantin Nottara's class at the Dramatic Arts Conservatory from 1906 to 1907. His debut was the 1906 play Eroii noștri, published under is real name; the tragicomedy deals with the corrupted turn of the century youth. Also under his birth name, Convorbiri Critice published the plays Vânt de primăvară (1908), Poveste banală (later Poveste studențească), Înviere and Două credințe (all 1909). Between 1910 and 1911, he published Scena magazine with Liviu Rebreanu. In 1913, he was literary secretary of Marioara Voiculescu's acting company. His dramatic sketch Săracul popă!, his tragicomedy Praznicul calicilor (both published in Convorbiri Critice in 1909, under the pen name Sorbul suggested by magazine chief Mihail Dragomirescu) and his 1914 drama Letopiseți introduced a prosaic-realist, anti-romantic vision into the Romanian historical drama.

The tragicomedy called Amoruri anormale in its first version (1908–1909) premiered in 1916 as Patima roșie, with Elvira Popescu in the role of Tofana. Teatrul Mic performed the play in its Paris tour of 1923, and the local press compared its heroine to Phèdre. Sorbul's tragicomedy Dezertorul (1917) and his drama Răzbunarea, a sequel to Patima roșie, were staged at Iași. He headed Săgetătorul magazine from 1921 to 1922. In 1923, he was a founding member of the Society of Romanian Dramatic Authors, serving as its president from 1927. In 1931, he was chairman of the Cluj National Theatre. The 1933 novel O iubești?, endowed with an atmosphere of magical realism, features a protagonist without special abilities who, fascinated by a friend's creative talent, assumes his identity. Mângâierile panterei (1934) is an epic novelization of the 1921 drama Prăpastia, in which the heroine is haunted by a past crime. Adevărul și numai adevărul (1936) is a detective novel, while Glasul nevesti-mi (1938) is a collection of humorous sketches. He won the national prize for theatre in 1937. In January 1939, Sorbul joined King Carol II's National Renaissance Front, as part of a mass recruitment among Romanian Writers' Society members. Sorbul died in Bucharest.

A street and a park in Mioveni bear his name.
