= Grigore Manolescu =

Romanian stage actor

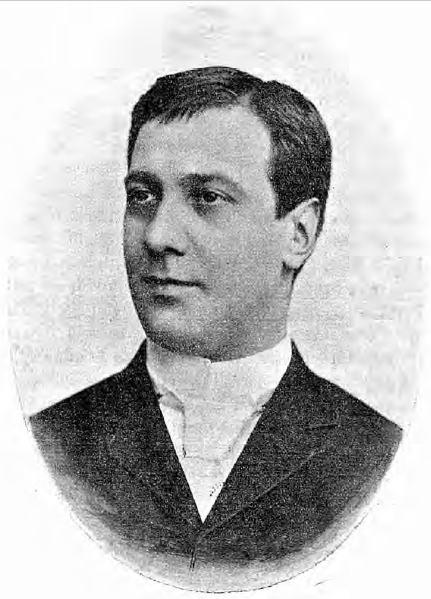
Grigore Manolescu

Grigore Manolescu (March 28, 1857–July 14, 1892) was a Romanian stage actor.

Born in Bucharest, he left his family at age 14 in order to work in the theatre. He entered the Conservatory in 1871 under Ștefan Vellescu, who was initially reluctant to admit the youth, perceiving a disproportionate body and defects of diction.

Manolescu made his debut in 1873, in the play Un bal din lumea mare, in the troupe of Matei Millo, at the Bossel Theatre. He acted in comedies for a time at the Walhala. In 1875, he began to appear at the Iași National Theatre. In 1878, he made his debut at the National Theatre Bucharest, in the role of Quintus Fabius Maximus, in Rome vaincue by Dominique-Alexandre Parodi. His first prominent appearance was later that year as the title character in Victor Hugo’s Ruy Blas. In 1879, he performed as Despot Vodă in the play by Vasile Alecsandri.

In 1880, Manolescu, together with Aristizza Romanescu, left on a scholarship for Paris, where they studied under Louis-Arsène Delaunay. Meanwhile, he was influenced by Italian verismo. In 1881, he returned to Bucharest, where he was named scene director at the National Theatre; his major successes began at this point. He excelled in great tragic roles, while also playing comedies. His appearances included Răzvan (Răzvan și Vidra, by Bogdan Petriceicu Hasdeu), Gallus (Fântâna Blanduziei, by Alecsandri), Ovidiu (also by Alecsandri), Kean (by Alexandre Dumas), Karl Moore (The Robbers by Friedrich Schiller) and Don Carlos (also by Schiller). From William Shakespeare, he played Ferdinand in The Tempest, Macbeth, Romeo and, most notably, Prince Hamlet. Manolescu himself translated a French edition of Hamlet into prose; its “efficient dialogue”, “suggestive phrasing” and “fluency of speech” made it suitable for performance.

In 1891, together with Romanescu, he organized the first foreign tour of the National Theatre Bucharest, at Vienna. Among the plays performed were Hamlet, Romeo and Juliet, The Ironmaster by Georges Ohnet and Nerone by Pietro Cossa. His final season began that autumn: wracked by cancer, he managed to perform some of his older roles at Bucharest, Iași and elsewhere in Western Moldavia. His final appearance was in Civil Death by Paolo Giacometti, at Piatra Neamț. He died in Paris in July 1892; two weeks later, he was buried at Bellu Cemetery.

Manolescu was married to actress Anicuța Popescu; together with Romanescu, they formed a love triangle of rivalry and jealousy.
