= Aristizza Romanescu =

Romanian actress

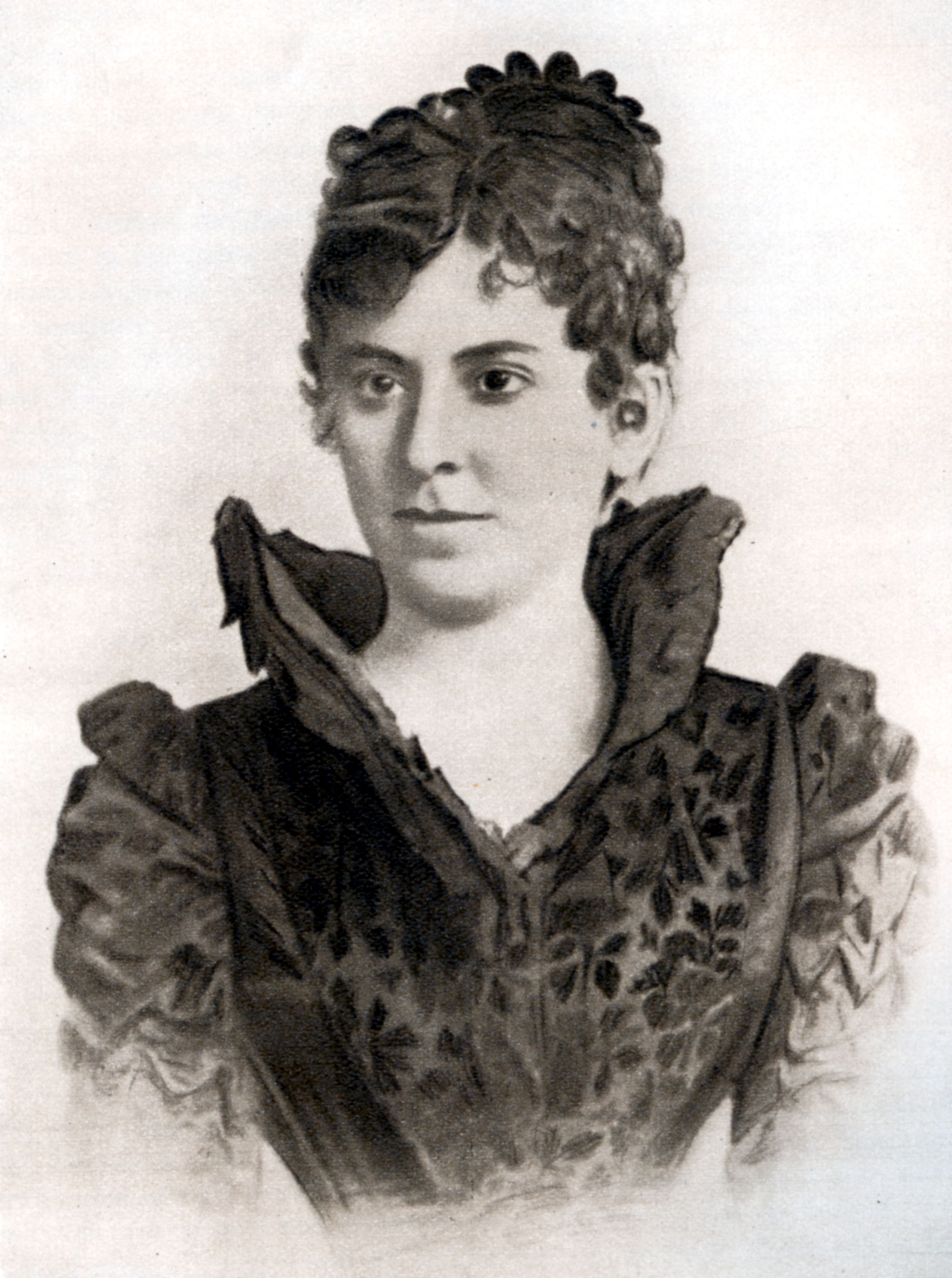
- Born: 1854
- Died: 1918 (aged 63–64)

Aristizza Romanescu (December 24, 1854, Craiova – June 4, 1918, Iași) was a Romanian stage actress, active 1872–1918.

== Life ==
In 1911 Grigore Brezeanu was making the first Romanian films to deal with fiction. He employed Romanescu as well as other leading actors like Constantin Nottara and Elvire Popesco. The first two films were called "Fatal Love" and "Spin a Yarn". No copies are known of these films.
