= Constantin I. Nottara =

Romanian stage actor and director (1859–1935)

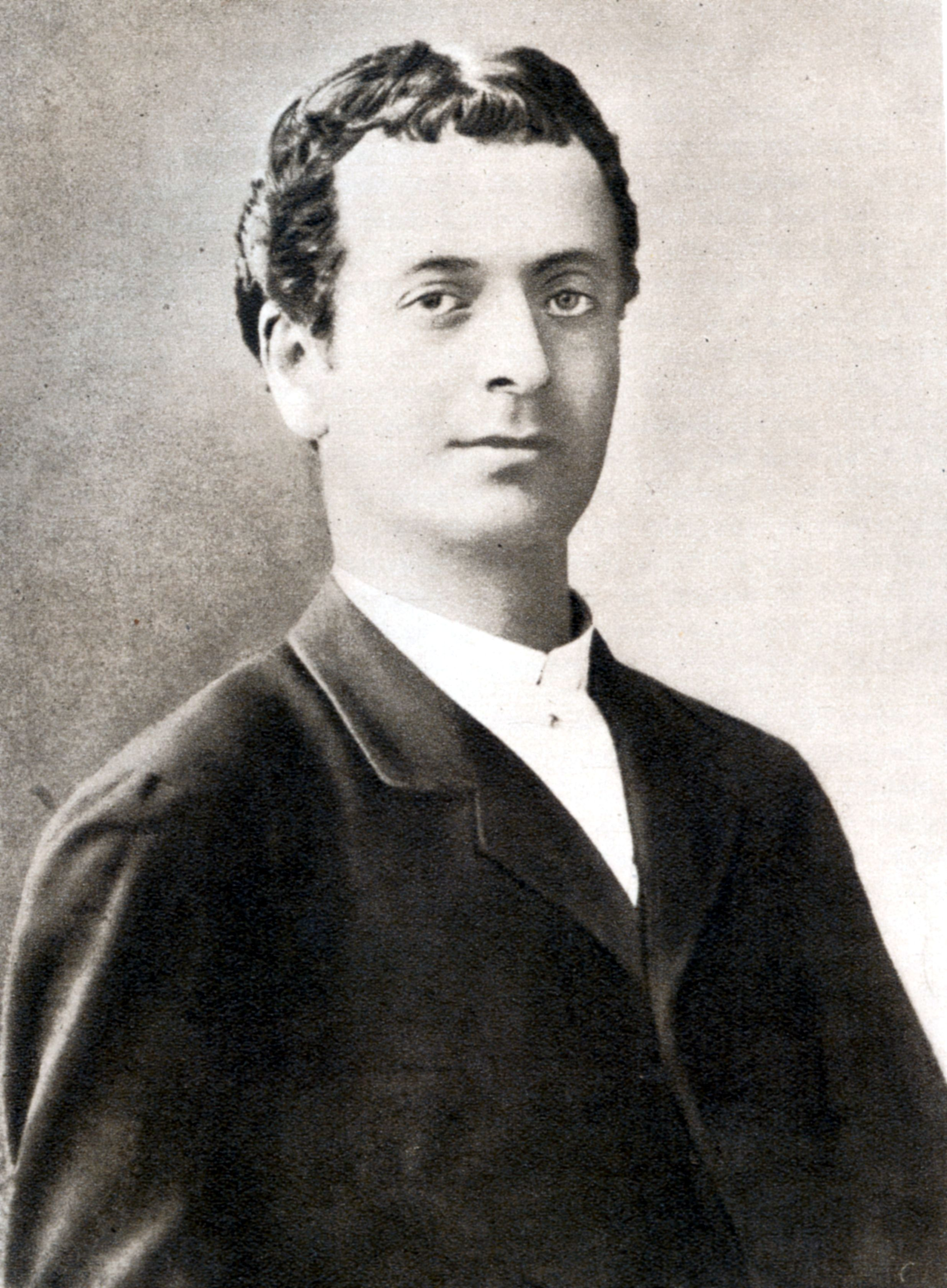
Nottara as a young man

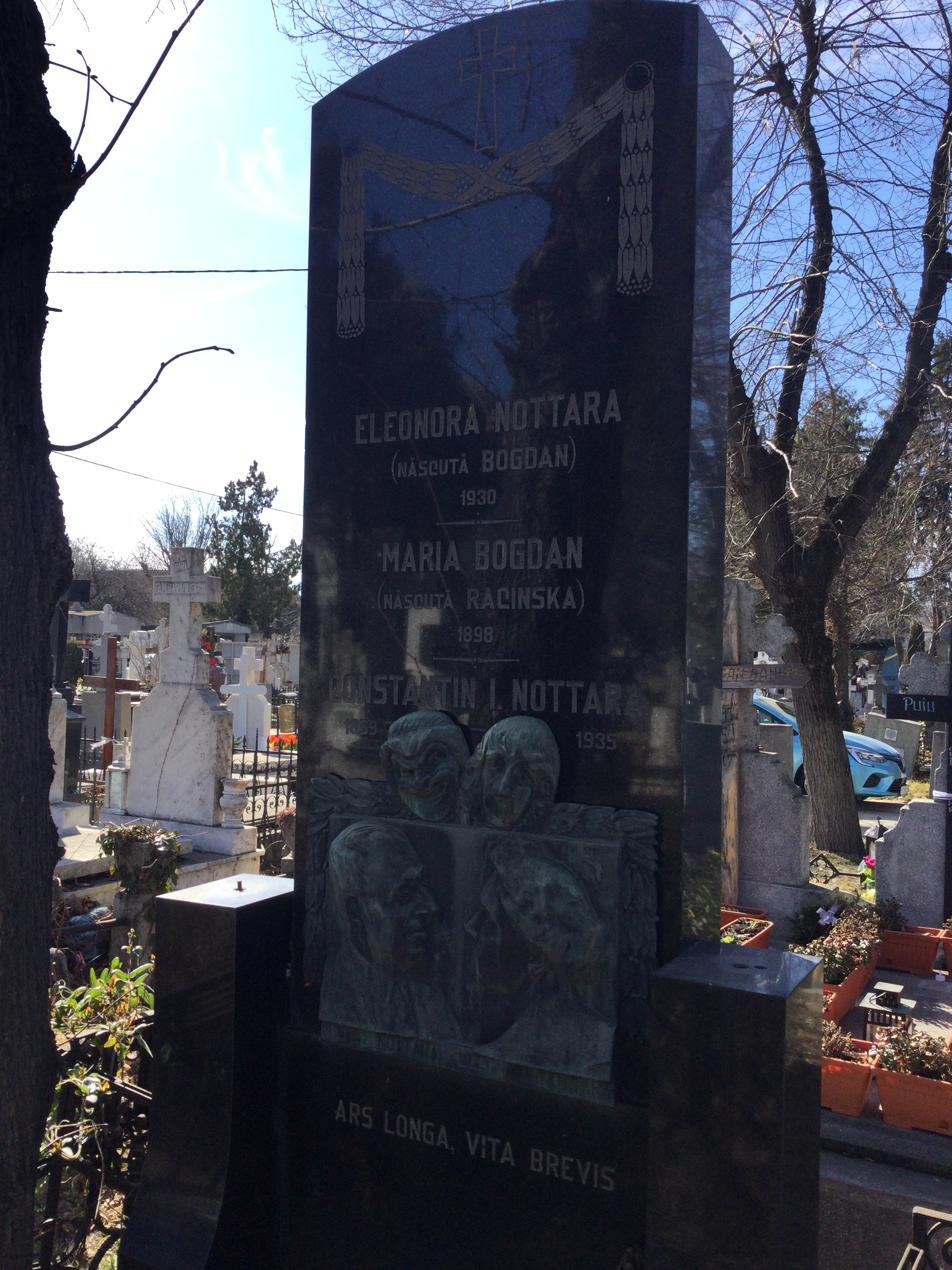
Grave at Sfânta Vineri Cemetery

Constantin I. Nottara (June 5, 1859–October 16/17, 1935) was a Romanian stage actor and director.

Born in Bucharest into a middle-class family of Byzantine Greek origin, he attended a private school from 1866 to 1870, followed by Saint Sava High School from 1870 to 1878. Orphaned as a child, he was left in the care of a neglectful tutor. Nottara was interested in the theatre from a young age, and attended the Bucharest Conservatory from 1876 to 1879, studying under Ștefan Vellescu. At the same time, he joined the troupe of Mihail Pascaly. Other artistic models included Matei Millo and the visiting Italian actor Ermete Novelli, much in vogue. In 1877, Ion Ghica hired him as an apprentice at the National Theatre Bucharest, quickly gaining renown. A summer trip to Paris in 1883 allowed him to see the great French actors of the day.

In 1884 he played in Vasile Alecsandri’s Fântâna Blanduziei, followed by the premiere of O scrisoare pierdută, by Ion Luca Caragiale. Soon after, he played Shylock in The Merchant of Venice, by William Shakespeare, after which he undertook a triumphal tour of the country. In 1889, he took on a managerial role at the National Theatre. The following year, he appeared in Caragiale’s Năpasta and also played the title role in Sophocles’ Oedipus Rex; he subsequently played Oberon in Shakespeare's A Midsummer Night's Dream.

In 1892, following the death of colleague Grigore Manolescu, Nottara took on his roles; as actor and director, he was responsible for the theatre's entire repertoire. Continuing his preoccupation with Shakespeare, he played the lead role in Hamlet, delivering an original performance improved by careful study. This was followed ten years later by the aged monarch in King Lear. Meanwhile, he continued performing domestic authors: Alexandru Davila’s Vlaicu-Vodă (1902); Barbu Ștefănescu Delavrancea’s Ștefan din Apus de soare and Viforul (1909) and Ragi-Tudose (1912); and Victor Eftimiu’s Cocoșul negru (1913). In 1912, he appeared as Osman Pasha in the feature film Independența României.

In addition to acting and directing, Nottara was also a professor of drama, training young actors for the stage, including Constantin Tănase, Lucia Sturdza-Bulandra, George Vraca, Elvira Popescu and Jules Cazaban. His career spanned 60 years and some 700 roles, evolving from romanticism to realism and including comedy, drama and tragedy. He was involved in a range of aspects pertaining to production, from translating texts and selecting the cast to studying the characters and expressions to hairstyles and makeup. In 1931, with help from fellow actors, Nottara purchased a house in Bucharest, which became a museum in 1956. He had one son, the musician Constantin C. Nottara.
