= O scrisoare pierdută =

1884 comedy by Ion Luca Caragiale

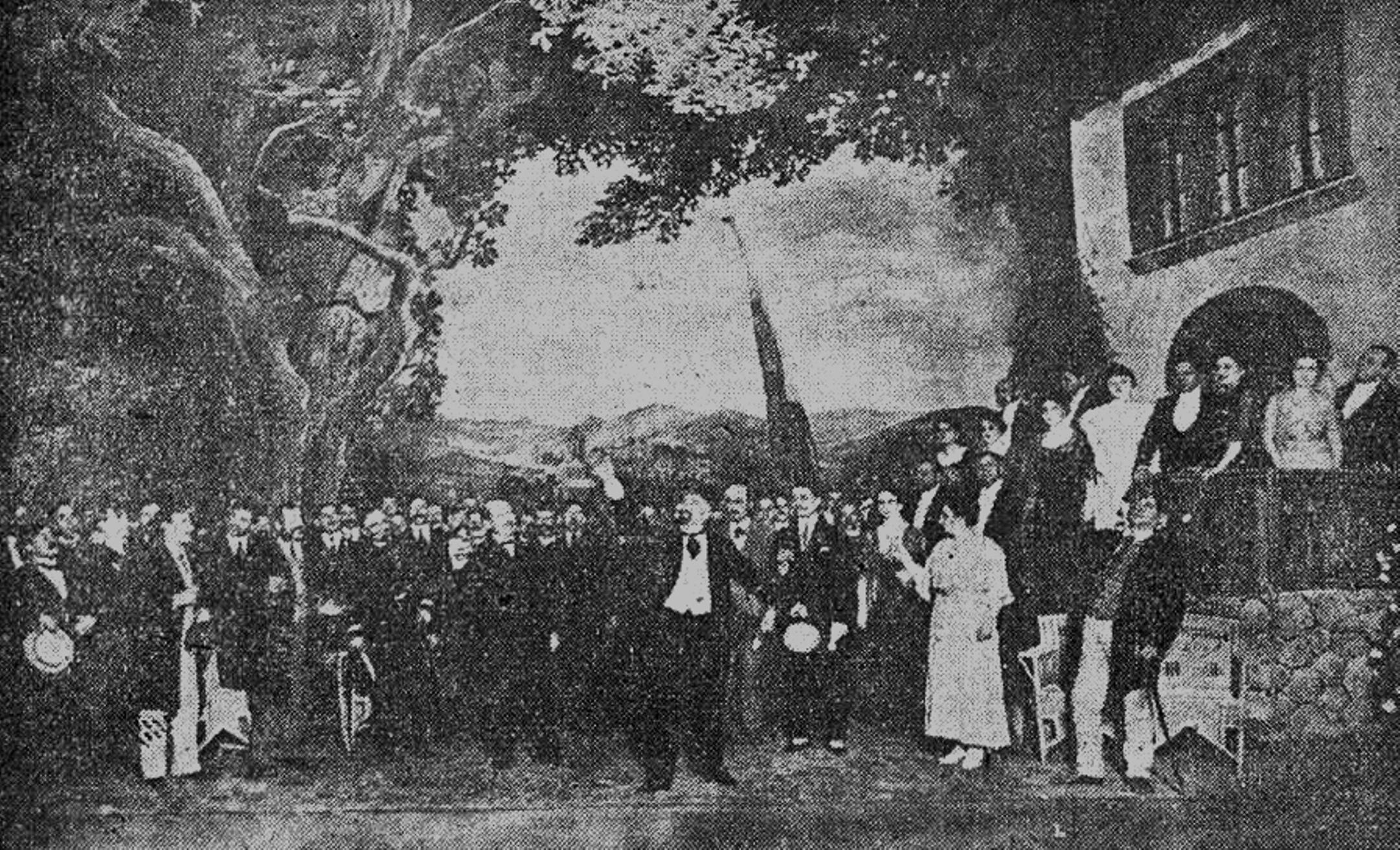
- Written by: Ion Luca Caragiale
- Original language: Romanian
- Genre: comedy

Premiere
- Date premiered: 1884
- Place premiered: National Theatre Bucharest

O scrisoare pierdută (Romanian for "A Lost Letter") is a play by Ion Luca Caragiale. It premiered in 1884, and arguably represents the high point of his career.

It was adapted into a 1953 film A Lost Letter.

It was first performed in English in 2019 at the Romanian Cultural Institute in London. The translation is available here: https://www.pdf2html5.com/pdfupload/server/php/uploads/admin_oxffauqbza/lost-letter-2019/complete.php

== Characters ==
- Nae Cațavencu: lawyer, manager and owner of the „Răcnetul Carpaților” (The Roar of the Carpathians) newspaper, president and founder of the Enciclopedic- Cooperative Society „Aurora Economică Română” (the Romanian Economical Aurora), scoundrel greedy for power
- Ștefan Tipătescu: the prefect of the county, celibate, arrogant and abusive treats his county like his own estate, Zoe Trahanache's lover
- Zaharia Trahanache: President of the Permanent Committee, of the Electoral Committee, of the School Committee, of the Agricultural Committee and of other Committees, aware of his wife's affair, but which he accepts
- Zoe Trahanache: Trahanache wife, the coquettish type, intelligent, authoritative, ambitious, Ștefan Tipătescu's lover
- Ghiță Pristanda: the town's policeman, the all-round good man of prefect Ștefan Tipătescu, who often uses him as a kind of personal servant
- Cetățeanul turmentat: character of the comedy that hides one of the most subtle dramaturgical tricks of the brilliant Caragiale – in a society that has lost the cult for authentic human values, honesty could appear as a vice and would have disturbed the intrinsic order of the play, so that the playwright was forced to create a vicious person in order to endow him with certain qualities
- Agamemnon (Agamiță) Dandanache: an old warrior from the 1848 Revolution, "stupider than Farfuridi and more scoundrel than Cațavencu"
- Tache Farfuridi: lawyer, member of the committees above mentioned, fanfaron and demagogue
- Iordache Brânzovenescu: member of Trahanache's political team forms, together with Farfuridi, a comic couple, both by behavior and by their names with culinary resonances

== See also ==
- List of Romanian plays
