= Charles Drouhet =

Romanian literary historian (1879–1940)

Charles Drouhet (January 22, 1879–January 8, 1940) was a Romanian literary historian.

Born in Bârlad, his parents were Pierre Drouhet and his wife Natalia (née Olivari), high school teachers. His paternal grandfather Charles was a physician at Blaye, a French town near Bordeaux. His father was born in France and emigrated to Romania; in 1869, he became a French teacher at Bârlad's Gheorghe Roșca Codreanu High School. His mother, the daughter of the local girls' boarding school director who herself later became teacher and director there, married Drouhet in 1867.

Drouhet completed primary school in 1889, went to Codreanu for the 1889-1890 year and subsequently entered Saint Sava National College in Bucharest, graduating in 1896. He attended the University of Bucharest, earning a degree in modern philology in 1900. In 1909, he took a doctorate in literature from the Sorbonne. His first position was as a substitute Romanian teacher at Codreanu in 1900; the following year, he became a substitute at the local normal school. Drouhet became a teacher at Dimitrie Cantemir High School in Bucharest in 1904. He was hired as a substitute professor at the French department of the University of Iași's literature faculty in 1909, rising to full professor the following year. In 1915, he succeeded the deceased Pompiliu Eliade as professor of French language and literature in Bucharest, holding the post until his death.

Drouhet first published in 1906: a linguistic study in Romania magazine and another about Leconte de Lisle in Convorbiri Literare. His work also appeared in Viața Românească, Viața Nouă, Revue d’histoire littéraire de la France, Le correspondent, La Minerve française and Mercure de France. Alone or in collaboration, he authored several fine French textbooks for high schoolers.

He was particularly noted as a literary historian, devoting ample study to French literature. Drouhet's university courses were published as: Istoria poeziei franceze în sec. al XIX-lea, 1915; Istoria teatrului clasic francez, 1916; Comentarii din clasicii francezi din sec. al XVII-lea, 1919-1920; Curs de literatură franceză. Secolul al XVIII-lea, 1919-1920; Villon Montaigne, 1923-1924; Începuturile romantismului francez, 1927-1928; Literatura franceză în secolul al XVIII-lea, 1934; Poezia lirică în Evul Mediu și comentarii din Charles d’Orléans și François Villon, 1934; Literatura franceză. Boileau și Voltaire, critici literari, 1934-1935; Literatura franceză. Preromantismul francez (1761- 1820), 1934-1935; Literatura franceză. Romantismul, 1937; Literatura franceză. Umanismul. Renașterea și Rabelais, 1937; Literatura franceză. La Chanson de Roland. Poezia lirică medievală. Trubadurii. François Villon, 1937- 1938; Literatura franceză. teatrul romantic, romanul romantic, ivirea spiritului realist în epoca romantică, Bucharest, 1937-1938; Literatura franceză. Poezia franceză în sec. al XVI-lea. Clément Marot. La défense et illustration. Ronsard, poet liric și epic, 1938-1939. He was equally interested in cultural relations between France and Romania.

His doctoral thesis, which dealt with François Maynard, won the Bordin Prize of the Académie française in 1910. His 1924 Vasile Alecsandri și scriitorii francezi remains a model of comparative research, well documented and nuanced, especially attentive to the particularities of the author studied. For his merits as a professor, Drouhet was awarded the Order of the Crown in 1911 and 1922, and he was inducted into the Legion of Honour in 1922.
