= Gabriela Chaborski =

Romanian chemist (1891–1936)

Dr. Gabriela Chaborski
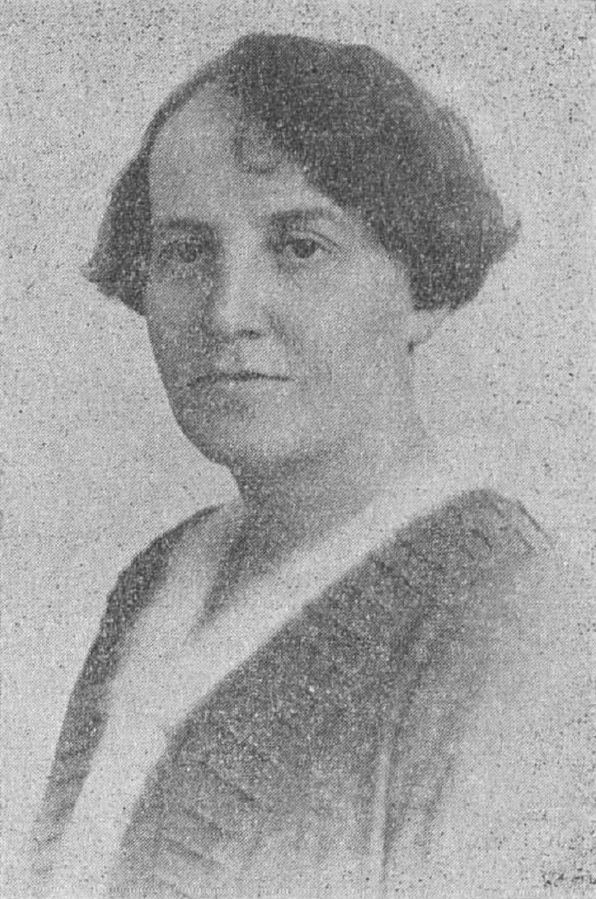
- Gabriela Chaborski before 1936
- Born: 14 October 1891; Bârlad, Kingdom of Romania
- Died: 25 November 1936 (aged 45); Bucharest, Kingdom of Romania
- Citizenship: Romanian
- Education: University of Bucharest; University of Geneva
- Known for: Research in analytical chemistry and studies of thermophilic and cryophilic yeasts
- Scientific career
- Fields: Chemistry, analytical chemistry, biochemistry
- Workplaces: University of Bucharest
- Thesis: Recherches sur les levures termophiles et cryophiles (1918)
- Doctoral advisor: Robert Hippolyte Chodat

Gabriela Chaborski (also spelled Chaborschi; 14 October 1891 – 25 November 1936) was a Romanian chemist and university lecturer. She worked at the University of Bucharest, where she taught general chemistry, electrochemistry and quantitative analysis. Her scientific work included methods in inorganic and analytical chemistry, studies of molecular association, and doctoral research on yeasts carried out at the University of Geneva. She was the first woman vice-president of the Romanian Society of Chemistry.

== Early life and education ==
Chaborski was born on 14 October 1891 in Bârlad, in the Kingdom of Romania. She was of Polish and German family origin: her father, Ludovic Chaborski, had emigrated from Poland in 1868, settled first in Bârlad and later in Ploiești, and married Emilia Schnell, who was of German origin.

She completed secondary school in Ploiești in 1911, then studied physical and chemical sciences at the University of Bucharest, where she received a competitive scholarship and graduated with a licentiate in 1914. She continued her studies in Switzerland as a Romanian state scholar at the University of Geneva, where she earned a doctorate in physical sciences, specializing in chemistry, with the thesis Recherches sur les levures termophiles et cryophiles. Her doctoral research was conducted in the botanical institute's plant chemistry laboratory under Robert Hippolyte Chodat. During her studies she also received special certificates from the physical chemist Philippe A. Guye.

== Academic career ==
Before leaving for Switzerland, Chaborski worked from September 1913 to February 1916 as an assistant in the physics and chemistry laboratories of the Casa Școalelor, directed by Eugen Ludwig. After completing her doctorate, she returned to Bucharest and in July 1919 was appointed substitute assistant in the inorganic chemistry laboratory of the Faculty of Sciences at the University of Bucharest, under Gheorghe Gh. Longinescu. She became a permanent assistant after an examination in 1920 and was appointed head of laboratory work in the same laboratory in 1921.

In 1924 Chaborski substituted for G. P. Teodorescu in a general chemistry course for first-year natural sciences students and students of the university's electrotechnical institute. She was subsequently appointed honorary lecturer. Her course covered chemical reactions, equilibria, electrolytes, precipitation, hydrolysis, catalysis, electrolysis, pH, volumetric analysis, potentiometry, spectroscopy and gas analysis. She became a titled lecturer from 1 January 1928.

During the 1929–1930 academic year she taught quantitative analysis to second-year students at the Institute of Industrial Chemistry and the Electrotechnical Institute, and supervised laboratory classes twice weekly. In 1930 the Senate of the Faculty of Sciences recommended her continuation as permanent lecturer. By the 1932–1933 academic year she was teaching general chemistry and electrochemistry at the Electrotechnical Institute and quantitative analysis at the Institute of Industrial Chemistry and the Botanical Institute.

Chaborski was among the earliest women to hold a senior academic position in Romanian higher education. She has been identified as the first woman university lecturer (Romanian: conferențiar universitar) in analytical chemistry at the University of Bucharest and, according to the Romanian newspaper Viața Liberă, the first woman university lecturer in Romania.

== Scientific work ==
Chaborski's doctoral work investigated yeasts capable of living under abnormal temperature conditions. According to her 1928 list of titles and works, she isolated new yeasts from figs and bananas, studied them biologically and biochemically, and investigated thermophilic and cryophilic yeasts. Her work included studies on reductases in yeasts, the production of hydrogen sulfide during alcoholic fermentation, and the relationship between reducing action and alcoholic fermentation. Later taxonomic literature continued to mention Asporomyces chaborski as a historical yeast name, although the genus was later treated as a synonym of Candida.

In the early 1920s, Chaborski collaborated with Longinescu on analytical chemistry methods. Their work included tests for hydrochloric acid in the presence of hydrobromic and hydroiodic acids, a method for nitric acid, methods for detecting sodium and potassium by wet analysis, detection of chromium in the presence of manganese, detection of calcium in the presence of barium and strontium, and separation of metals of the third analytical group. Some of these papers appeared in the Bulletin de la Section Scientifique de l'Académie Roumaine and in the Bulletin de la Chimie Pure et Appliquée de la Société Roumaine des Sciences.

In 1927 Chaborski and Longinescu presented L'association moléculaire considérée comme phénomène de concentration molaire to the Romanian Society of Chemistry. The work proposed the concept of molar concentration as a way of interpreting molecular association phenomena. The subject was later discussed in Natura, which noted that the French chemist A. Boutaric had commented on the novelty of the concept.

== Science communication and publications ==
Chaborski contributed frequently to Natura, a Romanian periodical for the popularization of science. Her articles included a series on atoms and elements and pieces on isotopes, Egyptology, and chemistry in warfare, including translations and notes. She also gave radio university lectures, including Povestea atomilor și elementelor.

In 1926 she published Atomii de azi, a short book on contemporary ideas about atomic structure, in the scientific-current-affairs series edited by Gheorghe Țițeica.

== Death ==
Chaborski died in Bucharest on 25 November 1936 from a heart disease attributed by contemporaries to rheumatism contracted in childhood. At the service held at the crematorium chapel on 27 November 1936, addresses were given by Longinescu, Dragomir Hurmuzescu, D. Buttescu, president of the Romanian Society of Chemistry, and Nicolae Iordache on behalf of the assistants in the inorganic chemistry laboratory.

== Selected publications ==
- Chaborski, Gabriela (1918). Recherches sur les levures termophiles et cryophiles (PhD thesis) (in French). Geneva: Université de Genève.
- Longinescu, G. G.; Chaborski, Gabriela. "Recherche de l'acide chlorydrique en présence des acides bromhydriques et iodhydriques". Bulletin de la Section Scientifique de l'Académie Roumaine (in French). 1919/1920 (5–6): 122–124.
- Longinescu, G. G.; Chaborski, Gabriela. "Méthode simple pour la recherche de l'acide nitrique". Bulletin de la Section Scientifique de l'Académie Roumaine (in French). 1919/1920 (10): 177–178.
- Longinescu, G. G.; Chaborski, Gabriela (1923). "Méthode simple pour la recherche du sodium et du potassium par voie humide". Bulletin de la Chimie Pure et Appliquée de la Société Roumaine des Sciences (in French). 26 (1–3).
- Chaborski, Gabriela (1923). "Recherche du chrôme en présence du manganèse par voie humide". Bulletin de la Chimie Pure et Appliquée de la Société Roumaine des Sciences (in French). 26 (1–3).
- Longinescu, G. G.; Chaborski, Gabriela (1924). "Recherche du calcium en présence du barium et du strontium". Bulletin de la Chimie Pure et Appliquée de la Société Roumaine des Sciences (in French). 27 (1–3).
- Longinescu, G. G.; Chaborski, Gabriela (1924). "Séparation des métaux du III-éme groupe analytique". Bulletin de la Chimie Pure et Appliquée de la Société Roumaine des Sciences (in French). 27 (6).
- Chaborski, Gabriela (1926). Atomii de azi (in Romanian). Bucharest: Cultura Națională.
- Longinescu, G. G.; Chaborski, Gabriela (1927). "L'association moléculaire considérée comme phénomène de concentration molaire". Comptes rendus des séances de la Société Roumaine de Chimie (in French).
