= Orășanu =

Orășanu is a Romanian surname. Notable people with the surname include:

- N. T. Orășanu (1833?–1890), Wallachian-born Romanian poet, prose writer, and newspaper editor
- Ștefan Orășanu (1869–1903), Romanian historian, literary critic, and poet
