= Constantin Hamangiu =

Romanian jurist

Constantin N. Hamangiu (December 31, 1869–January 7, 1932) was a Romanian jurist.

Born in Bârlad, he attended the city's Gheorghe Roșca High School. He then studied at the University of Bucharest, graduating with a law degree, after which he entered the magistracy. Hamangiu became a circuit judge in Bucharest in early 1894, and a substitute prosecutor at the Vâlcea County tribunal later that year. In 1895, he was appointed prosecutor at the Covurlui County tribunal. From 1902 to 1905, he was chief prosecutor of the Ilfov County tribunal. From 1905 to 1908, he was a prosecutor at the Iași appeals court. Hamangiu was then moved to Galați and raised to the rank of adviser. He then served at the Craiova appeals court until 1915, when he resigned from the magistracy.

In 1918, Hamangiu was named general secretary in the Justice Ministry. That autumn, he became an adviser at the High Court of Cassation and Justice, a post he retained until his death. As such, he sponsored the printing of important law volumes; Hamangiu was an expert on civil law. In 1930, he was elected an honorary member of the Romanian Academy, an institution to which he made significant donations. In April 1931, he was named Justice Minister in the technocratic cabinet of Nicolae Iorga. Soon after, he was elected to the Assembly of Deputies. He died the following January, while still a minister.
