= Bârlad Ghetto =

The Bârlad Ghetto (Hebrew: גטו ברלאד; Romanian: Ghetoul Bârlad) was one of the open ghettos in Romania during the Holocaust. The ghetto was active between 1940 and 1943, and in 1942, at its peak, it had 3,224 Jews. Jews from neighboring towns such as Puiești were brought to this ghetto.

== Background ==
Since the beginning of Jewish presence in Bârlad in the second half of the 17th century until World War II, many pogroms were carried out against the Jews who settled there, and there were even organizations that incited protests against the Jews.

One of the pogroms was in 1868, and when Moses Montefiore learned of it, he sent a letter to Prince Carol I, who promised him that things would change, and the Jews who were harmed would receive compensation for the damage according to the assessment of the judges. However, this did not happen, and the pogroms against the Jews continued.

At the end of the 19th century, the economic situation of the Jewish population worsened due to persecutions, which mainly affected brokers and merchants. The Romanian merchants in Bârlad opposed the discrimination against their Jewish colleagues, and in 1898, they submitted a protest to the Ministry of Commerce in Bucharest against the decision of the local Chamber of Commerce to act to remove the Jewish brokers. In the fall of 1899, emigration from Bârlad increased, and the total number of Jewish emigrants from Bârlad between 1899 and 1902 reached 600.

In 1907, an antisemitic circle was founded by teachers, priests, and political leaders, the purpose of which was to incite its students to attack Jews. Two of the students who took part in the pogroms were expelled from school. In protest of their expulsion, the other students armed themselves and stormed the Jewish quarter for the purpose of destruction and looting; 80 shops of Jewish merchants and craftsmen were damaged in this rampage.

== During the Holocaust ==
The suffering of the local Jews increased during the period of Iron Guard rule over Romania (National Legionary State). In November 1940, all Jewish men were captured for forced labor; shortly thereafter, the academics among them were released as a result of protests by Romanian academics, who threatened that they too would come to work with their Jewish colleagues. With the expulsion of Jewish students from the state gymnasium, the Jewish community established its own gymnasium, where 80 students studied in 1940, 93 students in 1941, 50 students in 1942 and 1943. In the elementary school, 180 students studied in 1940 and 1941, 186 children in 1942, and 161 children in 1943. Four Jewish students were arrested and accused of spreading communist opinions. They were taken to Vaslui and tortured there to extract a confession. In their trial held on 19 December 1940, in Galați, they were acquitted.

The economic consequences of the harassment of Jews are highlighted by these numbers from 1942: out of 325 Jewish craftsmen and workers, 125 were unemployed; out of 294 Jewish clerks, only 136 were employed; out of 428 Jewish merchants, only 254 were active; and out of 43 Jewish academics, only 23. That year, only 24% of Jewish professionals could practice their professions. Due to the depletion of livelihood sources, the community had to increase its support for impoverished families. In 1940, it supported 200 families; in 1941, it supported 300 families; and in 1942 and 1943, it supported 600 families.

With the outbreak of the war between Romania and the Soviet Union in June 1941, all Jews from the Tutova County localities of Plopana, Murgeni, Avrămești, and Rădeni, as well as some Jews outside the county from Berești and Fălciu, were deported to Bârlad. In the spring of 1943, the community's hospital, old age home, and bathhouse were confiscated by the "National Center for Romanianization". The guard in the open ghetto was less strict, and it was even possible to leave it for work with the guards' approval. During the ghetto's operation, women worked in sewing, and men in forced labor in the city or outside it (for example, in laying railway tracks).

The community also assisted Jews who worked in forced labor battalions, in Săușești in Tutova County, in Turcoaia in the Brăila district, in Alexandreni in the Tighina district, in Bessarabia in Soroca, and in Siret in the Focșani district. It sent them clothing and medicines and also took care of their children. Moreover, groups of Jews passing through the Bârlad train station on their way to forced labor camps were provided with food and money by the community. Additionally, the "Joint" organization was a source of assistance to Jews in distress in terms of food (corn cobs, potatoes, or flour). When the Jewish orphans returned from Transnistria, after their parents were murdered, the Bârlad community received 167 of them, established a home for some of them, and took them under its care until their immigration to Israel. Towards the end of the war, the Germans planned to exterminate the Jews in the area, but the advance of the Allies and the Red Army prevented them from doing so.
