= Marcel Guguianu =

Romanian sculptor

Marcel Guguianu (June 28, 1922 – June 12, 2012) was a Romanian sculptor.

== Biography ==
Born in Bârlad, Guguianu attended primary school and began high school there, finishing at Galați. From 1941 to 1945, he attended courses at the Fine Arts School in Bucharest, taught by Cornel Medrea. He then taught drawing and calligraphy at high schools in his native city. From 1954 to 1956 he was based in Iași, restoring historic monuments there and in Bârlad.

He began entering his sculptures at annual and biennial exhibitions in 1948. In 1956, he joined the Artists' Union of Romania and moved to Bucharest. Among the exhibitions where his work has featured are those at Budapest, Odense, Rome, San Marino, Naples, Aranđelovac, Belgrade, Montpellier, Paris, São Paulo, New York City, Ankara, Bamako, Washington, D.C., Seville, and Miami. His works include: Dalila, Auroră și amurg, Timpul și Clio, Neutralitate, Selene, Antineea, Meditație, Salomea, Pieta, Victorie, In memoriam, Maternitate, Armonie, Extaz, Eminescu, Nostalgie, Ciocârlia, Clio, Luchian, Tors, Concorde, Remember, Iudith, and Selen.

Guguianu's awards include an honorary prize at the 1972 Venice Biennale; three other prizes at Naples during the 1970s; and a gold medal from San Marino (1981). In 2002, upon marking his 80th birthday and over 60 years of activity, President Ion Iliescu made him a Knight of the Order of the Star of Romania. Two years later he was made an Officer, and in 2009 a Commander of the Order of the Star.

His work is exhibited at the Countess Madeleine Galleries in New York City. The Marcel Guguianu Foundation was established in 1992. In 2003, the Marcel Guguianu Pavilion, with his sculptures, sketches, drawings, and fotos was opened in Bârlad as part of the Vasile Pârvan Museum.
