= Pompiliu Eliade =

Romanian literary critic and historian

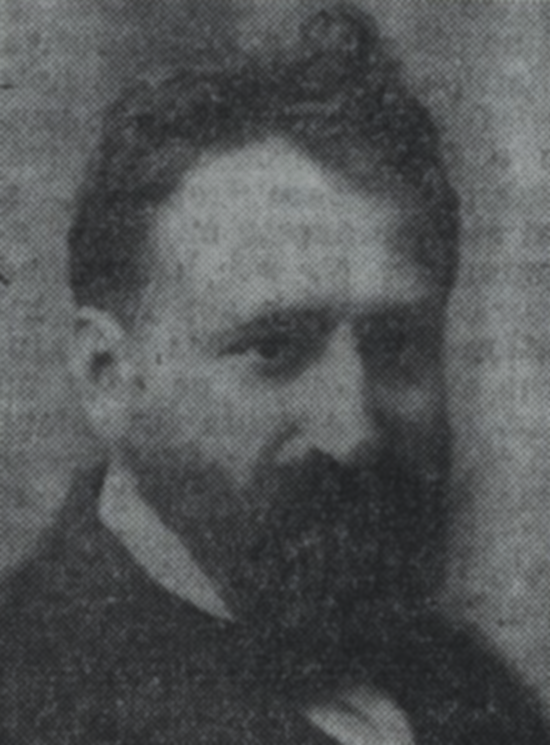
Portrait photograph of Eliade

Pompiliu Eliade (April 13, 1869 – May 24, 1914) was a Romanian literary critic and historian.

== Life ==
Born in Bucharest, he attended primary and high school in his native city, followed by the University of Bucharest, where he obtained a literature degree in 1891. He then studied at the École Normale Supérieure under Ferdinand Brunetière from 1892 to 1895, obtaining a doctorate in literature in 1898. His thesis dealt with French influence on Romania's public spirit during the Phanariote era. Hired as a substitute professor at Bucharest in 1900, he advanced to associate status in 1901 and full professor in 1904. He was the university's first important professor of French. In 1912, he was elected a corresponding member of the Romanian Academy. He was part of the Religious Affairs and Public Education Ministry's permanent council. A member of the National Liberal Party, he was elected to the Assembly of Deputies in 1907, serving for several months.

In 1908, he became director general of theatres, and from that year until 1911, served as chairman of the National Theatre Bucharest. He arrived with grand designs and a serious intent to stage a repertoire of an elevated cultural level, but lacked a practical understanding of the theatre's values and activities. Two individuals took particular issue with Eliade's tenure: the first was Alexandru Davila, whom he had replaced and who formed his own acting troupe in 1909. The second was Ion Luca Caragiale, whose plays Eliade considered too tied to passing phenomena and thus obsolete (an opinion later taken up by Eugen Lovinescu). In protest, Caragiale withdrew the rights to his plays from the National Theatre. Eliade nevertheless considered O noapte furtunoasă "a jewel of the genre", and O scrisoare pierdută the pinnacle of the Romanian theatrical repertoire.

=== Personal life ===
He married Elisa Popescu (born March 6, 1860) on July 4, 1902, the widow of a Mr. Carp. They raised the child of Elisa, Mariorel, and also had two children: Cristina (who died during the second world war) and Andrei (born July 4, 1906, died June 18, 1991).

== Works ==
Eliade's published debut took the form of his undergraduate thesis, inspired by the ideas of Titu Maiorescu: Silogismul și adversarul său Herbert Spencer. He contributed studies, reviews and columns to Literatură și artă română, Vieața nouă, Revista idealistă and L'Indépendance roumaine. His Causeries litteraires were written in the latter newspaper in the style of Charles Augustin Sainte-Beuve from 1901 and published in three volumes in 1903. They were vehemently attacked by Ștefan Orășanu at the urging of Nicolae Iorga, who himself launched a diatribe against Eliade, who in turn attempted to defend himself. In 1904, he published a study of Grigore Alexandrescu and his French antecedents.

In French, he wrote two fundamental books about the era when the modern Romanian outlook took shape. One was his Paris thesis. The second, picking up his study of French influences, was a two-volume work. The first of these, Histoire de l'esprit public en Roumanie au dix-neuvième siècle, appeared in 1905 and covered the years 1821-1828. The second, La Roumanie au XIXe siècle (1914), dealt with the 1828-1834 period. These treatises of cultural history and philosophy remain relevant not only for the richness of their information but also for their style, which recalls Sainte-Beuve and Hippolyte Taine. In his native language, he wrote two fine introductions to the work of Jean de La Fontaine (Filosofia lui La Fontaine, 1901) and Maurice Maeterlinck (Cu privire la Maurice Maeterlinck, 1912). The 1903 Ce este literatura? Condițiunile și limitele acestei arte is a published course that features his interesting theoretical views about literature, in the form of fifteen lectures.

== Views and legacy ==
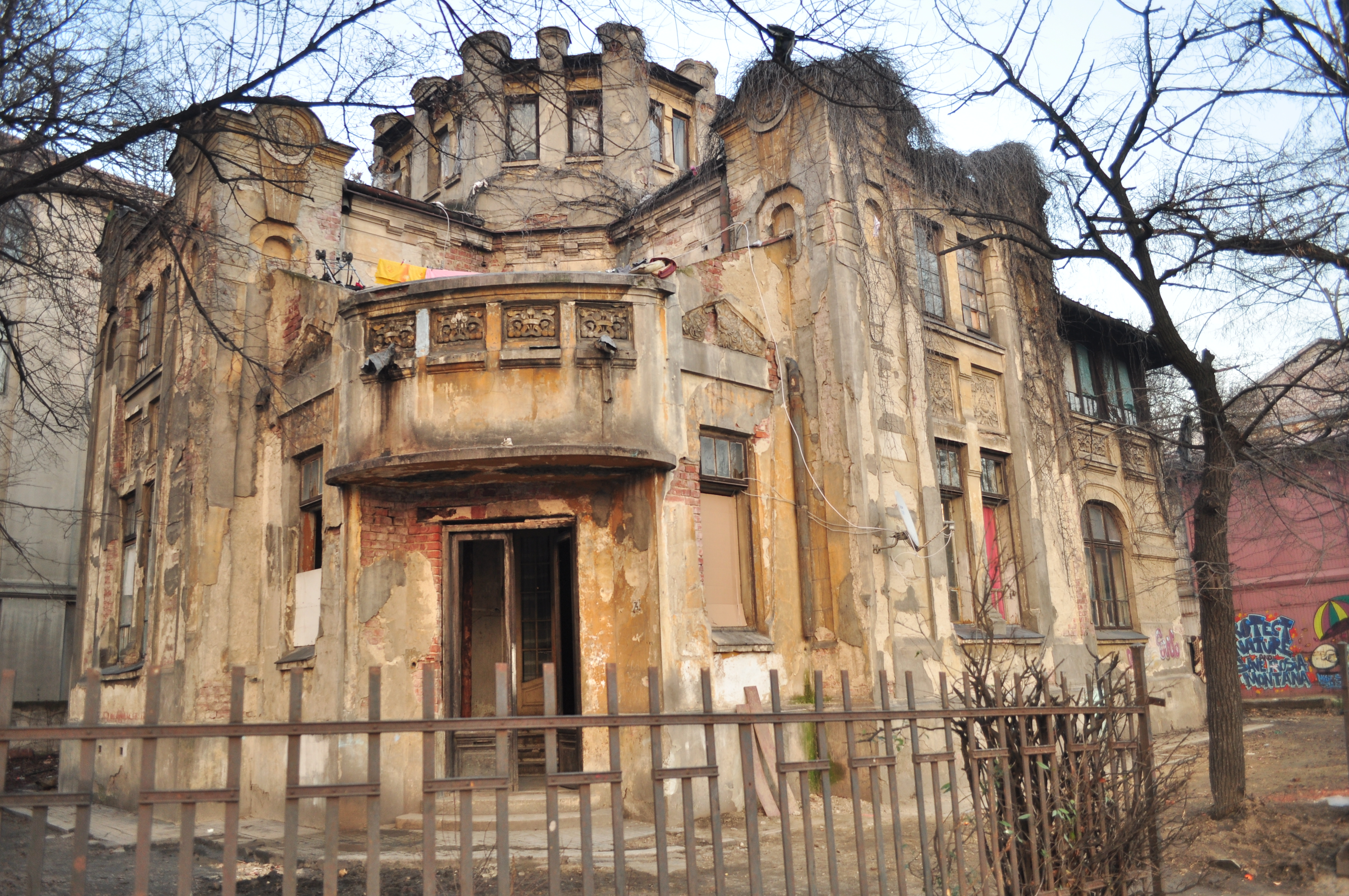
2014 picture of Eliade's house at Splaiul Independenţei, 74; at the time, it had been occupied by squatters

A follower of Maiorescu's aesthetic principles who was shaped by the impressionist, rationalist, historicist school of French criticism, he preferred literary classicism, shying away from romanticism and naturalism. When it came to symbolism, he valued only its vagueness. He believed that the human soul demands of art both vagueness (music) and clarity (literature). He noted literature's focus on the individual while the artist sees the general, creating rather than copying reality. Art should be essentially humanist, not exclusively personal–only its expression should be thus. Art does not tolerate immorality, but the ethical is distinct from the aesthetic. Criticism, he thought, was a sort of "art of art", an act of knowing literature expressed through the means of literature. The critic should follow four steps: the first, external, involves determining whether the work is one of prose or verse, tragic or comic, the impression its language leaves. The artistic phase involves the material condition (prosody, vocabulary, tropes), the ways of sketching action (narrative or descriptive). In the third, the critic attempts to penetrate the author's philosophy, the idea of the work. The fourth step sketches a human profile of the author and his personality traits.

Along with criticism, he considered literary history to be an art, writing that "it would be wonderful for the historian to be able to give the feeling of a novel". Many of his opinions regarding the pre-modern poets have been rendered obsolete by subsequent research: for instance, he did not know that Ienăchiță Văcărescu was familiar with Voltaire, or that Costache Conachi had translated a number of French authors. (Alexis Piron and Jean-Jacques Lefranc de Pompignan, whom he mentions as having influenced this group of writers, in fact had no impact in the Romanian lands.) He valued Vasile Alecsandri but accused him of falling into a great spiritual void; he was less enthusiastic about Mihail Eminescu because of his loose technique, pessimism and philosophical outlook, but nevertheless placed him between William Shakespeare and Johann Wolfgang von Goethe. He disliked Nissim from Ronetti Roman's Manasse, but favored the titular character for his "equilibrium". In Davila's Vlaicu Vodă, he saw the triumph of a centripetal external progress that has no time to await a slow, internal, centrifugal one. He tolerated plays by Haralamb Lecca, Grigore Ventura and others, but only in order to encourage the domestic repertoire. A promoter of Radu D. Rosetti's poetry, he admired the "objective" lyricism of the "classic" and "definitive" Ștefan Octavian Iosif, and was enraptured by Alexandru Vlahuță's România pitorească for its "triumph of reason over the feeble areas of sensibility".

Eliade was a short man (one contemporary described him as "the smallest of this country's high personages"), a gifted orator, a bel esprit, per Lovinescu. Fairly little has been written about him. His successor as professor, Charles Drouhet, published a study of his literary activity in 1915. In 1940, Drouhet's successor Bazil Munteanu wrote his own study, "De la Pompiliu Eliade la Charles Drouhet". A monograph by Ioana Vușdea appeared in 1985.
