= Ștefan Orășanu =

Romanian historian, literary critic and poet

Ștefan Orășanu (7 January 1869 – 12 November 1903) was a Romanian historian, literary critic and poet.

Born to a Romanian Orthodox priest in Bucharest, he attended elementary and high school in his native city. In 1901, Orășanu graduated from the University of Bucharest's literature and philosophy faculty. The following year, he obtained a scholarship to study modern and contemporary history in Germany, but was unable to benefit from this due to the disease that would soon claim his life. From 1895, he was a clerk at the Romanian Academy Library. In 1900, he joined the editorial committee of Convorbiri Literare magazine. He substituted for Nicolae Iorga at Bucharest's history faculty in 1901. His contributions also appeared in Economia națională, Epoca, Liga literară, Literatorul, Noua revistă română, Revista independentă, Revista societății "Tinerimea română", Revista poporului, România Literară and Românul literar. He sometimes used the pen names Polit and Z. Miron.

Orășanu wrote poetry, but most of his output consisted of studies on history and literary history, as well as reviews of theatre, music and fine arts. Several of these studies appeared in book form: Bibliografia cestiunii Orientului, 1899; Cronicarii moldoveni din secolul al XVII-lea, 1899; Istoria României contimporane. Note critice, 1900; Botanica populară. Note critice, 1900; Filosofia lui La Fontaine după d. Pompiliu Eliade. Note critice, 1901.

In the latter book, he attacked the opinions of critic Pompiliu Eliade, ridiculing his notion that the form of Mihai Eminescu's poetry marked a "considerable regression" from that of Vasile Alecsandri. The author also took aim at Eliade's critical methodology, characterizing it as "strikingly similar" to what Jean-François de La Harpe was doing in the late 18th century, and noting that this approach had long been abandoned even in France. Orășanu went on to mock Eliade's observations about the length and phonetic structure of verses, and the diagrams he used for demonstration. After finding other "errors" and "aberrations", he concluded that Eliade had written "a pastiche of a Parisian conference, in which cheap paradoxes give the illusion of originality".

Together with Ioan Bianu, he prepared a Romanian edition of a book by Alexandre Maurice Blanc de Lanautte, Comte d'Hauterive; this appeared in 1902 as Memoriu asupra vechei și actualei stări a Moldovei prezentat lui Alexandru Vodă Ipsilante la 1787.
