= Martin Bercovici =

Romanian electrical engineer

Martin Bercovici (24 August 1902, in Bârlad – 19 January 1971, in Bucharest) was a Romanian electrical engineer who contributed to the development of energy engineering education in Romania and to the plan of electric networks building of Romania. He served as a dean to the then newly founded Faculty of Energy Engineering within the Polytechnic University of Bucharest.

== Biography ==
After graduating from the Gheorghe Roșca Codreanu High School in Bârlad he enrolled into the Polytechnic University of Bucharest.

Bercovici contributed during World War II to the education of young Jews who were expelled from state universities.

In 1955 he was elected corresponding member of the Romanian Academy and in 1963 he was promoted to titular member of the academy.
