= Ioan Popescu Pedagogical High School =

- Liceul Pedagogic "Ioan Popescu"
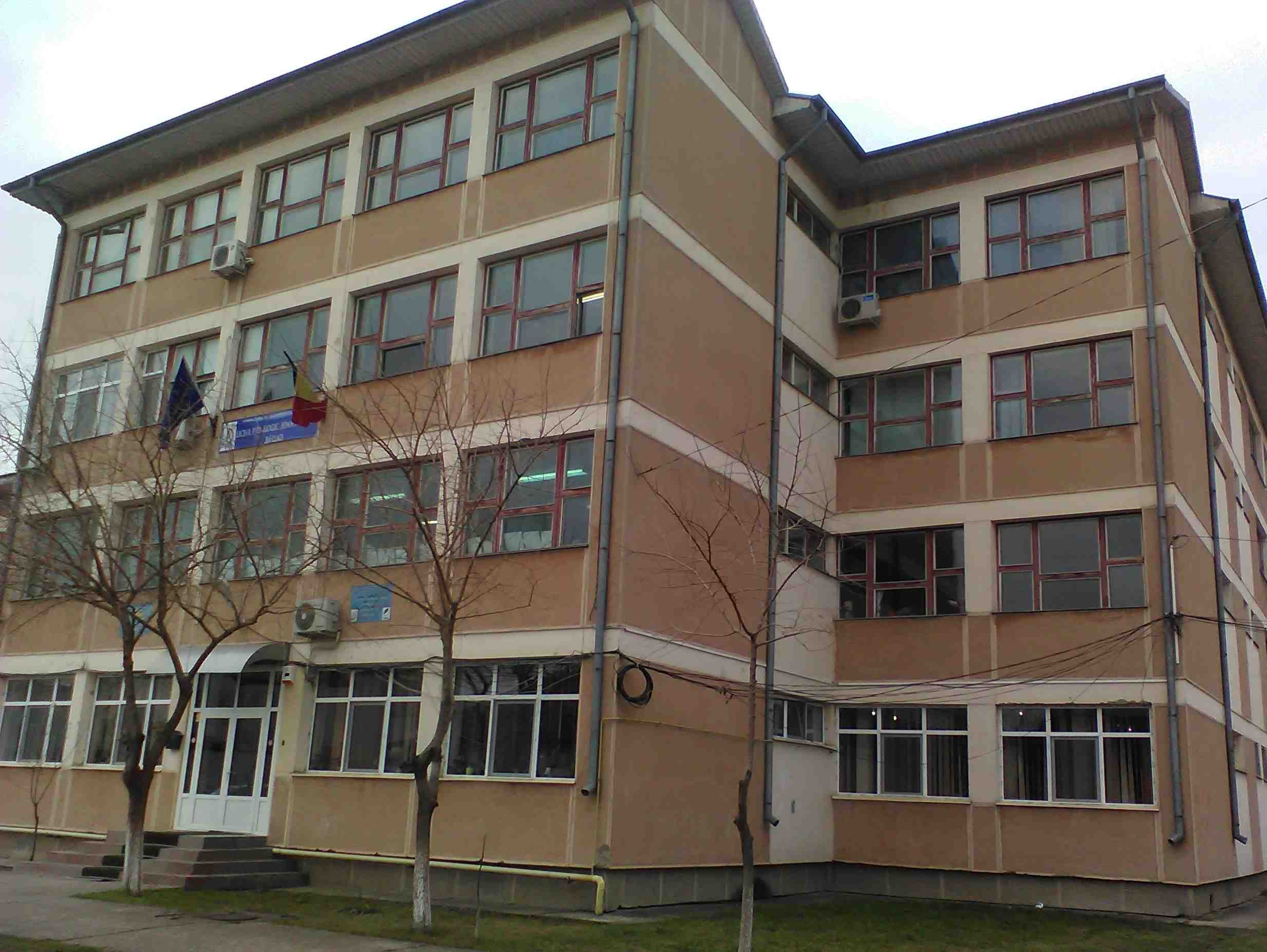
- The high school building

Location
- Strada Lirei, Nr. 15; Bârlad, Vaslui County; Romania
- Coordinates: 46.2175°N 27.6678°E

Information
- Funding type: Public
- Founded: 1870; 156 years ago
- Grades: 9–12
- Language: Romanian
- Website: www.lpb.ro

The Ioan Popescu Pedagogical High School (Romanian: Liceul Pedagogic "Ioan Popescu") is a high school located at 15 Lirei Street, Bârlad, Romania.

Along with the Pedagogical Profile, the school has wider vocational programs (Fine Arts, Musical, Sports) and classes for the Theoretical Program (English and French Majors). The school also includes a Kindergarten where students from the Pedagogical Profile can make their apprenticeship.

== History ==
The school was established on 29 November 1870, under the name Prince Ferdinard Teacher Training College (Romanian: Școala Normală "Principele Ferdinand"), and it was the second oldest pedagogical school in Moldavia and the sixth oldest of this kind in the Romanian United Principalities. In 1894, an Apprenticeship School for future teachers was founded within the Pedagogical School.

In its long history, the school activated in various buildings (Panainte Velicovici Building, the new building in northern part of the town that was burned in World War II, G.R. Codreanu High School, School Complex Bârlad, to name a few), until 15 September 2001, when it was finally moved to the present site, on Lirei Street. The school name was also changed over time: "Prince Ferdinard" Teacher Training College, Pedagogical Normal School, "Alexandru Vlahuță" Pedagogical School. Since 1 September 2014 the school has been called "Ioan Popescu" after its founder and first principal.

== Lines of studies and specialisations ==
1. Vocational studies

a) Pedagogical Profile

- Teacher for Elementary School and Kindergarten
- Teacher for Kindergarten and child care worker
- Instructor for Extracurricular Activities

b) Artistic Profile

- Artistic Technique Technician
- Instructor of Music
- Theater Instructor (discontinued)

c) Sports Profile

- Sport Instructor

2. Theoretical Studies (discontinued)

- English Major
- French Major

3. Kindergarten
