= Alexandre Maurice Blanc de Lanautte, Comte d'Hauterive =

French statesman and diplomat

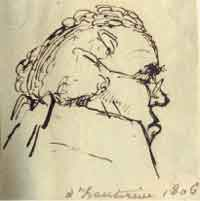
Alexandre Maurice Blanc de Lanautte by Frédéric-Christophe d'Houdetot

Alexandre Maurice Blanc de Lanautte, Comte d'Hauterive (1754–1830), a French statesman and diplomat, was born at Aspres (Hautes-Alpes) on the 14 April 1754 and educated at Grenoble, where he became a professor. Later, he held a similar position at Tours, where he attracted the attention of the duc de Choiseul, who invited him to visit him at Chanteloup.

Hauterive came into contact with noblemen who visited the duke. One of them, the comte de Choiseul-Gouffier, took Hauterive with him on his appointment as ambassador to Constantinople in 1784. Hauterive was enriched for a time by his marriage with a widow, Madame de Marchais, but was ruined by the French Revolution. In 1790, he applied for and received the post of consul at New York. Under the Consulate, however, he was accused of embezzlement and recalled. Although the charge was proven to be false, he was not reinstated.

In 1798, after trying his hand at farming in America, Hauterive was appointed to a post in the French foreign office. In that capacity, he made a sensation by his De l'état de la France, à la fin de l'an VIII (1800), which he had been commissioned by Napoleon Bonaparte to draw up as a manifesto to foreign nations after the coup d'etat of the 18th Brumaire. That won him the confidence of Bonaparte, and he was employed in drawing up many of the more important documents. In 1805, he was made a councillor of state and member of the Légion d'Honneur, and between 1805 and 1813, he was more than once temporarily minister of foreign affairs. He attempted though in vain to use his influence to moderate Napoleon's policy, especially in the matter of Spain and the treatment of the pope.

In 1805, a difference of opinion with Talleyrand on the question of the Austrian alliance, which Hauterive favoured, led to his withdrawal from the political side of the ministry of foreign affairs, and he was appointed keeper of the archives of the same department. In that capacity, he did very useful work and, after the Restoration continued at the request of the duc de Richelieu, his work being recognised by his election as a member of the Academie des Inscriptions et Belles-Lettres in 1820. He died in Paris on 28 July 1830.
