= Viața Liberă =

Regional daily newspaper published in Galați, Romania

Viața Liberă is a Romanian regional daily newspaper published in Galați, Romania. Founded on 22 December 1989 during the Romanian Revolution, the newspaper emerged from Viața nouă, the former local publication affiliated with the Romanian Communist Party. Several Romanian sources have described Viața Liberă as the first free newspaper published in Romania after the fall of the Ceaușescu regime.

== History ==
Viața Liberă was founded on 22 December 1989 by a group of journalists and writers from Galați. Its first issue was produced and distributed that night to people gathered in the streets during the revolutionary events in the city. The newspaper succeeded Viața nouă, the former official newspaper of the local communist administration in Galați County.

The application to register the publication as a commercial company was filed on 4 January 1990. SC Viața Liberă SA was registered with the Romanian Trade Register on 30 May 1991.

The newspaper is headquartered on Strada Domnească in Galați. Its activities have included newspaper publishing, advertising services, press distribution, and printing operations through its own facilities.

== Ownership and publisher ==
Viața Liberă is published by Trustul de Presă Dunărea de Jos in Galați. Company records indicate that Viața Liberă SA, incorporated in 1991, later operated under the name Trustul de Presă Dunărea de Jos SRL."VIATA LIBERA SA actuala TRUSTUL DE PRESA DUNAREA DE JOS SRL". ListaFirme.ro (in Romanian).

In 2011, Mediafax reported that European Media Investment (EMI), part of the Swiss media group Goldbach Media, sold its 84% stake in Viața Liberă to the company Mariano SRL, controlled by businessman Marian Băilă."European Media Investment a vândut ziarul Viaţa Liberă din Galaţi omului de afaceri Marian Băilă". Mediafax (in Romanian). 1 July 2011.

== Circulation and readership ==
Viața Liberă has been audited by the Romanian Audit Bureau of Circulations (BRAT). According to BRAT data, the newspaper had an average daily circulation of approximately 16,000 copies in 1999, 14,000 copies in 2006, and 10,000 copies in 2008.

In the late 2000s, Viața Liberă was described as one of the most widely read regional newspapers in Romania. The newspaper's official website reported an estimated readership of 159,000 daily readers. A media industry report from the same period ranked the newspaper second among Romanian local newspapers by readership, with approximately 116,000 readers per edition.

== Online edition ==
According to the newspaper, Viața Liberă launched its online edition in 1997, becoming one of the first regional newspapers in Romania to establish a web presence."Official website". Viața Liberă. The website publishes local news, opinion pieces, cultural reporting, and community information.
