= Gheorghe Roșca Codreanu National College =

Coordinates: 46.22635°N 27.66444°E

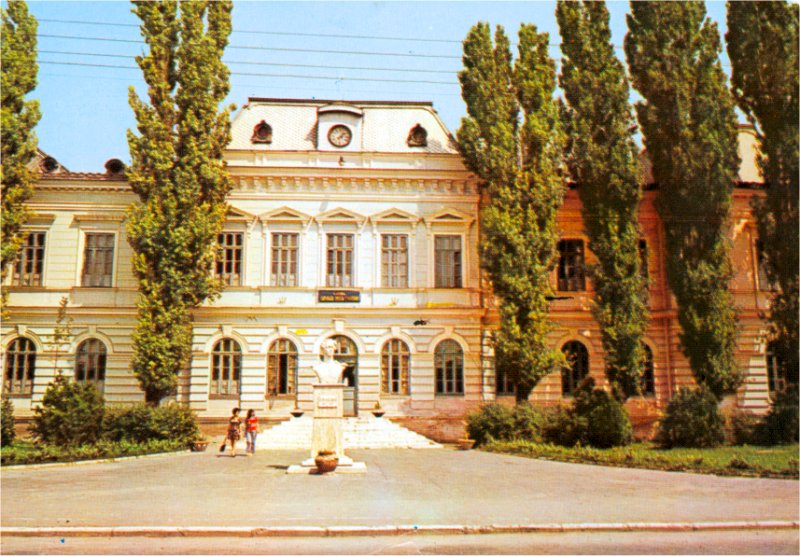
The school building in 1979

The Gheorghe Roșca Codreanu National College (Romanian: Colegiul Național Gheorghe Roșca Codreanu) is a high school located at 11 Nicolae Bălcescu Street, Bârlad, Romania.

The school was established by Gheorghe and Neculai Roșca Codreanu as a gymnasium in 1858, being upgraded to a complete high school in 1864. It is the fourth high school established in Romania, after the ones in Bucharest, Iași, and Craiova. The present building of the school was inaugurated on April 27, 1886. It is listed as a historic monument by Romania's Ministry of Culture and Religious Affairs.

== Alumni ==
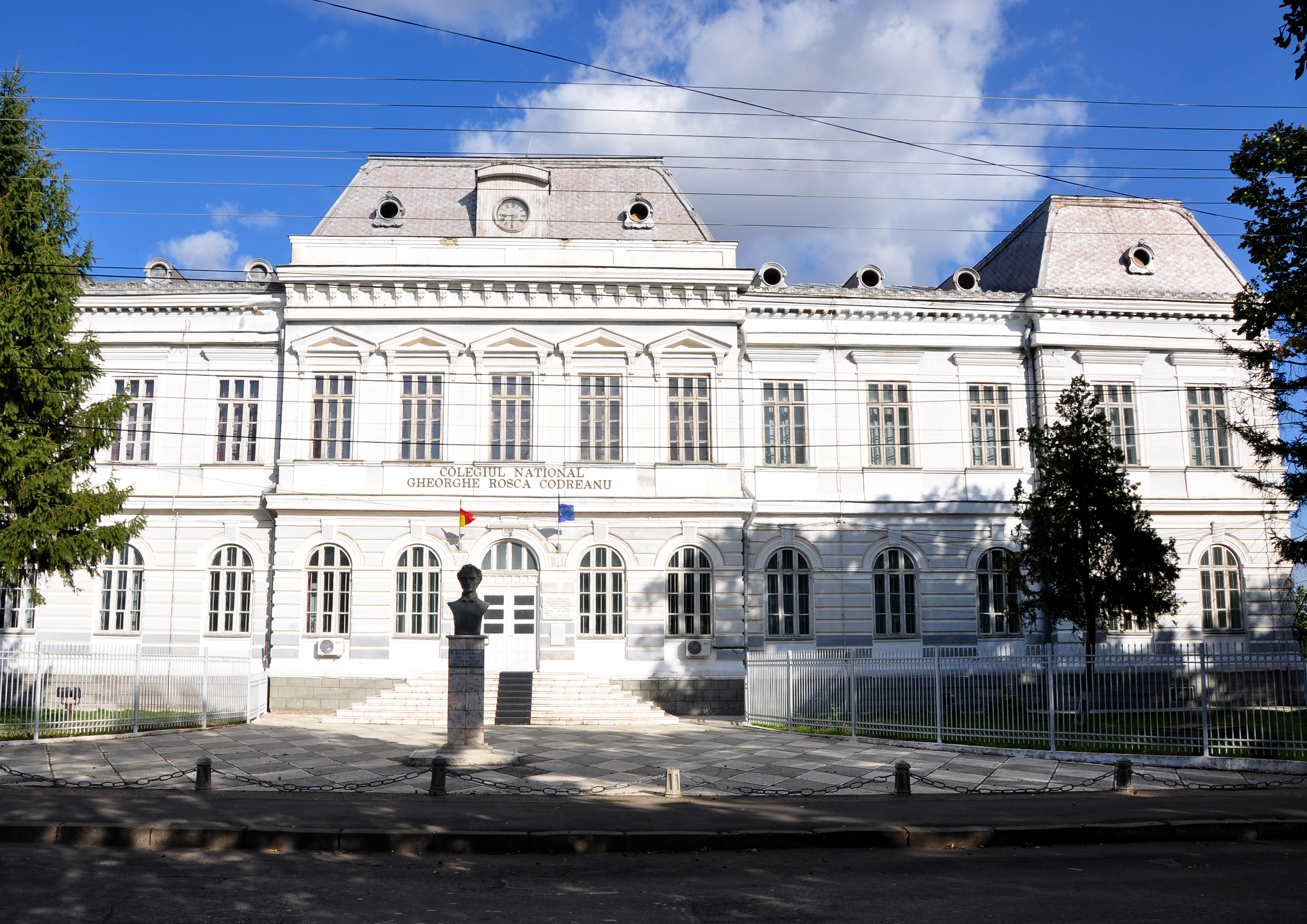
The school in 2014

- Nicolae Bagdasar
- Martin Bercovici
- Paul Bujor
- Constantin Chiriță
- Constantin Hamangiu
- Ion Hobana
- Raicu Ionescu-Rion
- George Ivașcu
- Vasile Pârvan
- Alexandru Philippide
- Ștefan Procopiu
- Lucian Raicu
- Gheorghe Tașcă
- Gheorghe Vlădescu-Răcoasa
- Alexandru Vlahuță
- Ștefan Zeletin
