= Bârlad =

Municipality in Vaslui County, Romania

- Municipality
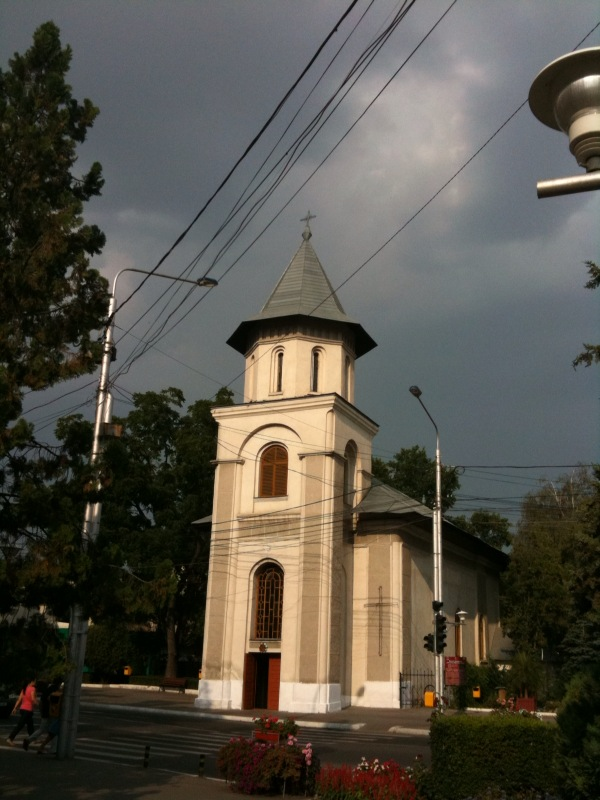
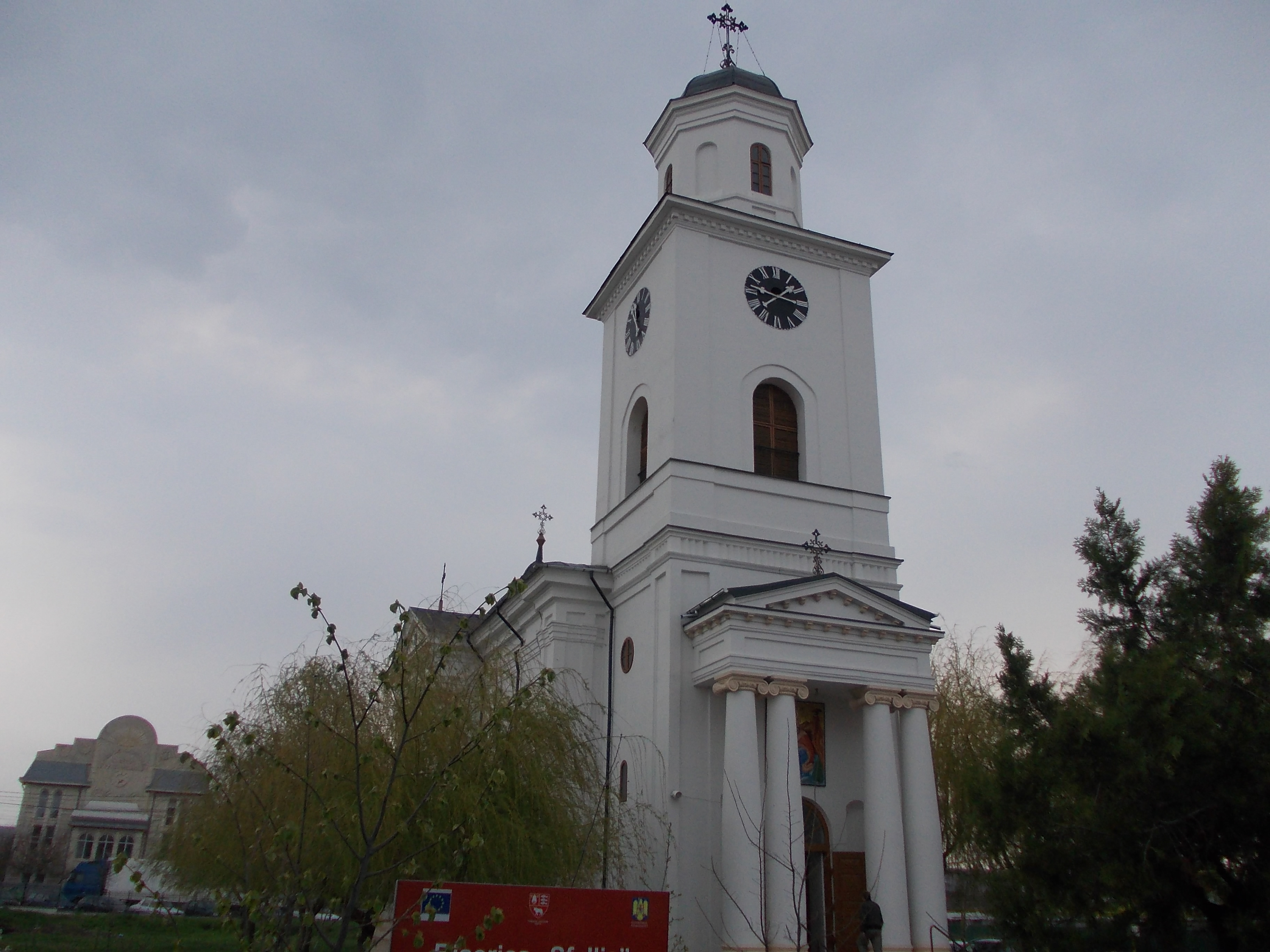
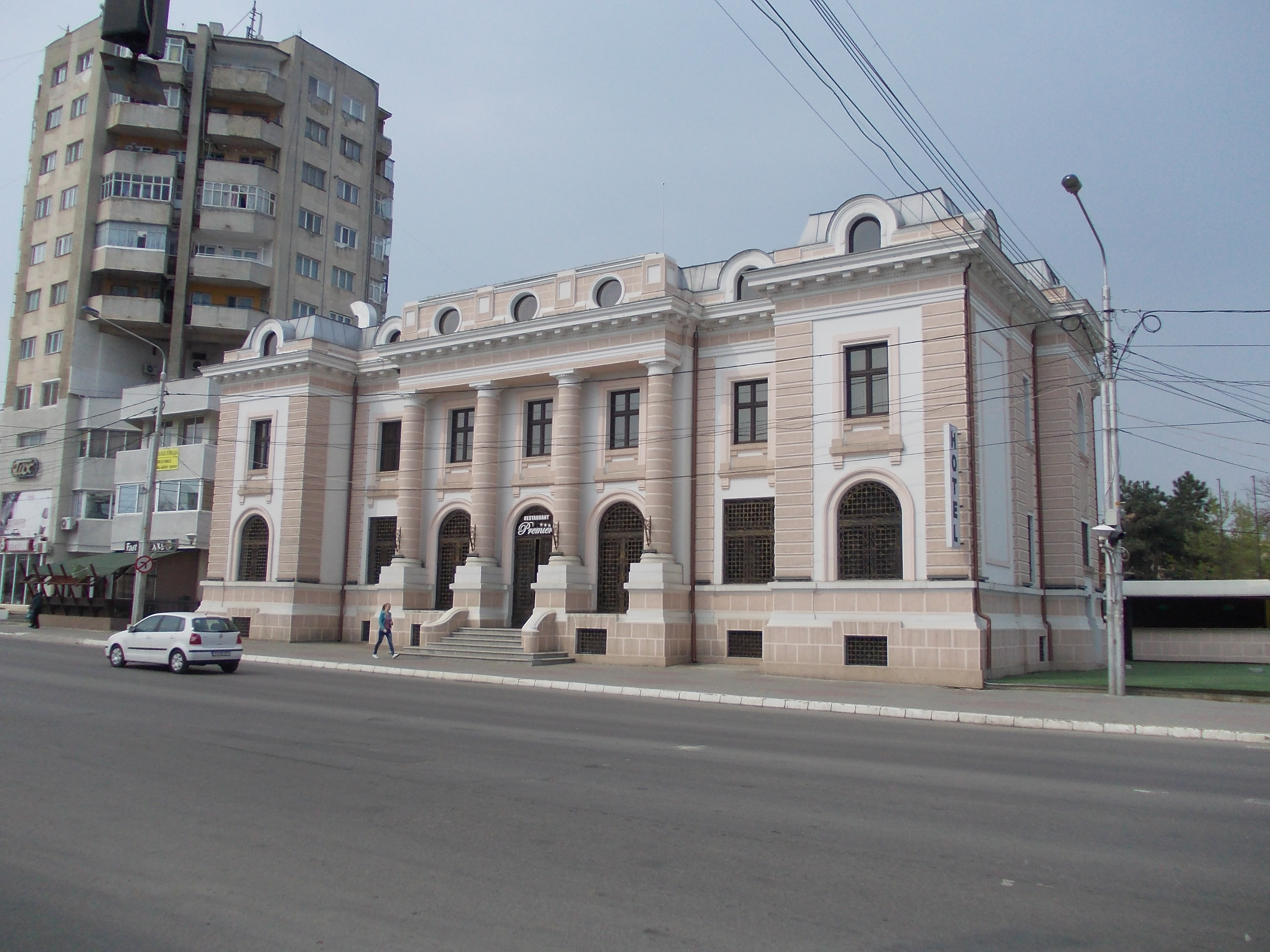
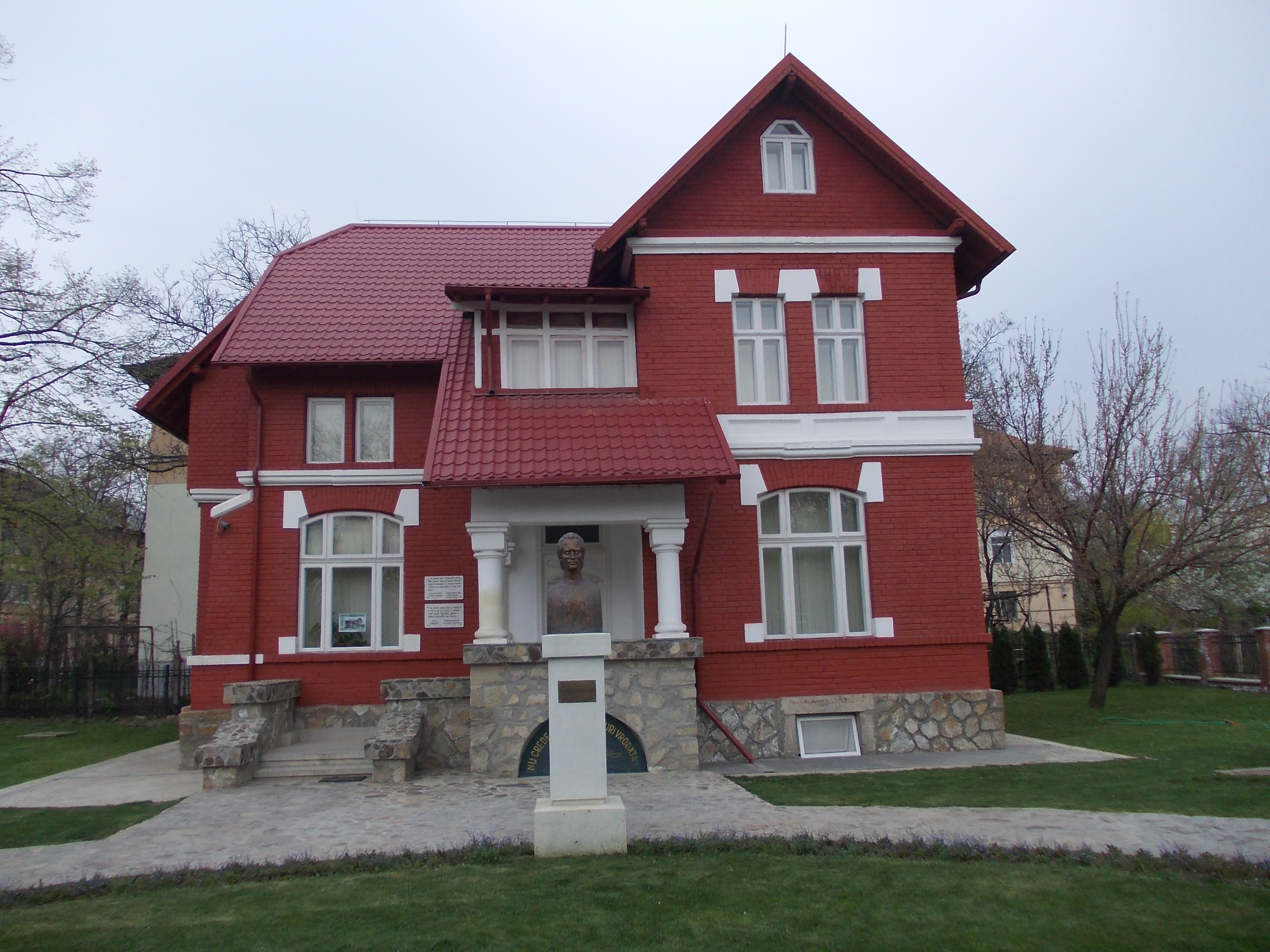
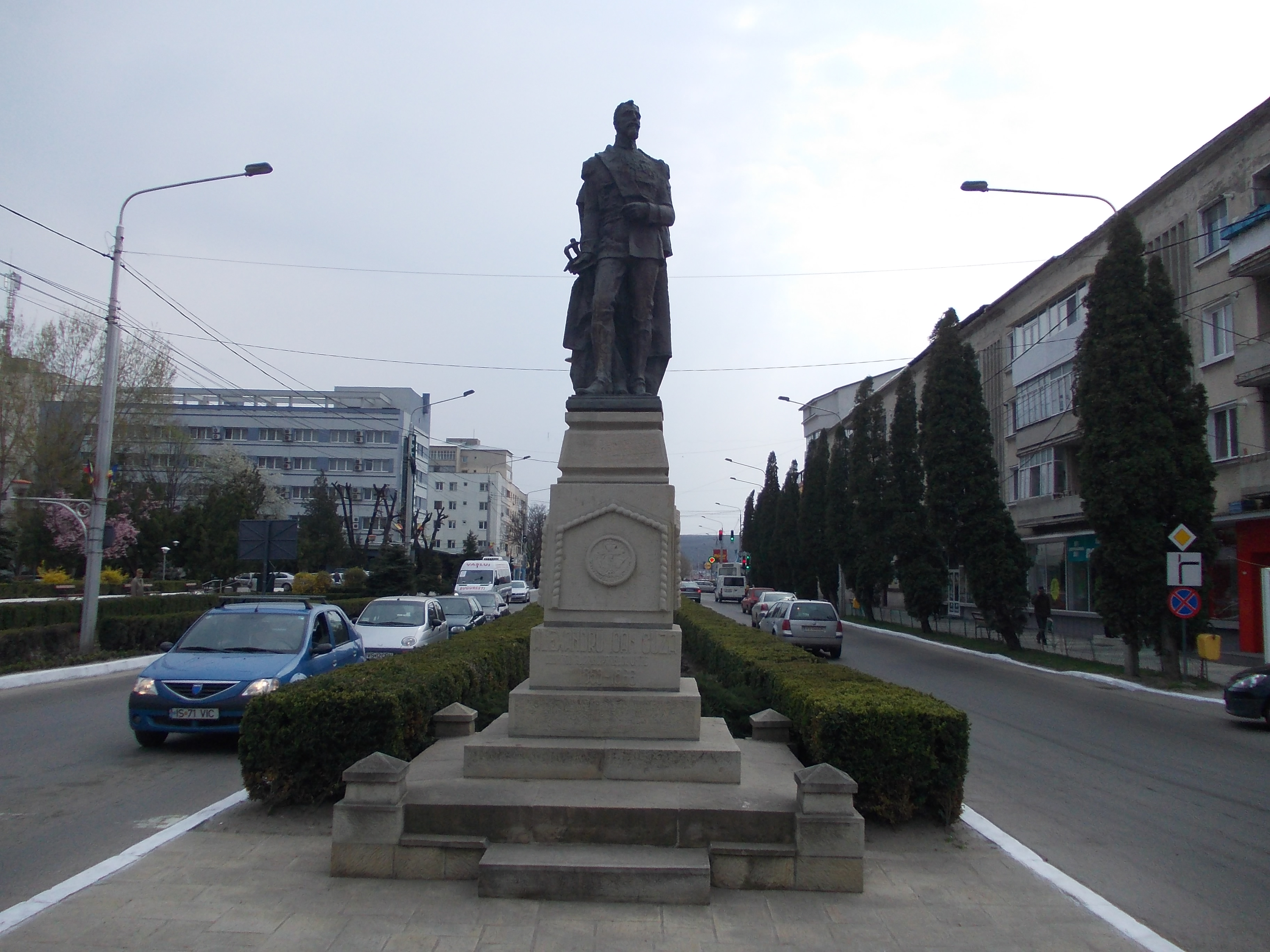
- Royal church Saint Elias Church Premier Hotel Mihai Eminescu cultural center Statue of Alexandru Ioan Cuza

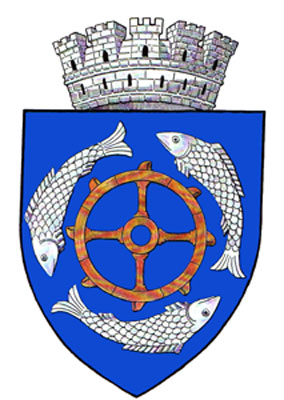
- Coat of arms

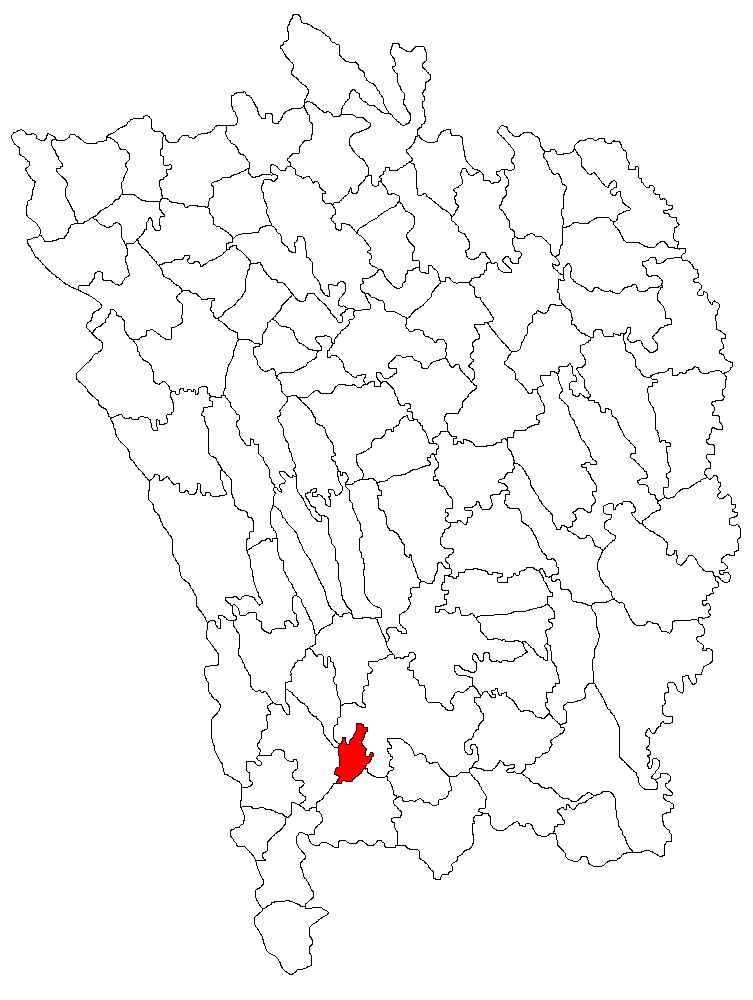
- Location in Vaslui County

- Location in Romania
- Coordinates: 46°13′N 27°40′E
- Country: Romania
- County: Vaslui

Government
  - Mayor (2024–2028): Dumitru Boroș (PSD)
- Area: 15 km^{2} (5.8 sq mi)
- Population (2021-12-01): 52,475
  - Density: 3,500/km^{2} (9,100/sq mi)
- Time zone: UTC+02:00 (EET)
  - Summer (DST): UTC+03:00 (EEST)
- Vehicle reg.: VS
- Website: www.primariabarlad.ro

Bârlad (Romanian pronunciation: [bɨrˈlad]) is a city in Vaslui County, Romania. It lies on the banks of the river Bârlad, which waters the high plains of Western Moldavia.

At Bârlad the railway from Iași diverges, one branch skirting the river Siret, the other skirting the Prut; both reunite at Galați. Along with a maze of narrow and winding streets, Bârlad features several notable modern buildings, including the hospital administered by the Saint Spiridion Foundation of Iași. In the vicinity of the city are the ruins of a Roman camp.

The city is the birthplace of Romanian Domnitor (Ruler) and diplomat Alexandru Ioan Cuza.

== Etymology ==
Scholars continue to debate the origin of the city's name. The Hypatian Codex mentions a market town called Berlad, and some historians, influenced by a document Bogdan Petriceicu Hasdeu published in the 19th century, have tried to link this town and its inhabitants (variously considered Romanians, East Slavs or an amalgam) with the Moldavian Bârlad. Ioan Bogdan demonstrated that the Hasdeu document was false, thus invalidating the hypothesis. Like Siret and Suceava, the medieval town took its name from the adjacent river, but nothing more can be said for certain. Constantin Cihodaru linked the name, of possible Hungarian origin, to a Slavic word (berlo — "rod", "cottage" or birlo — "swamp"), to which was added the Hungarian suffix -d, also found, for example, in the names Cenad, Arad, Tușnad, and Tășnad. Supporting this notion is the historic presence of a significant Hungarian community, with traditions recalling the fight against the Tatars in the mid-14th century.

== History ==
During World War II, Bârlad was captured on 24 August 1944 by Soviet troops of the 2nd Ukrainian Front during the Jassy–Kishinev Offensive. The city was once the county seat of the former Tutova County during the Kingdom of Romania times.

== Population ==
Historical population
Year	Pop.	±%
1859	13,165	—
1900	24,484	+86.0%
1912	25,288	+3.3%
1930	26,204	+3.6%
1948	24,035	−8.3%
1956	32,040	+33.3%
1966	41,060	+28.2%
1977	55,937	+36.2%
1992	77,518	+38.6%
2002	69,183	−10.8%
2011	55,837	−19.3%
2021	52,475	−6.0%

== Notable people ==
- Gabriela Chaborski
- Constantin Aur
- Martin Bercovici
- Elena Bibescu
- Mihail Cristodulo Cerchez
- N. D. Cocea
- Adi Cristian Colceru (David Deejay)
- Alexandru Ioan Cuza
- Anton Davidoglu
- Cleante Davidoglu
- Manolache Costache Epureanu
- Elena Farago
- Leonte Filipescu
- Gheorghe Gheorghiu-Dej
- Max Goldstein
- Marcel Guguianu
- Ernest Juvara
- Valeriu Lazarov
- Alexandru I. Philippide
- Ștefan Procopiu
- Andreea Răducan
- Marcus Eli Ravage
- Nicolae Tonitza
- Ovidiu Tonița
- Bogdan Zebega
- George Tutoveanu

== Education ==
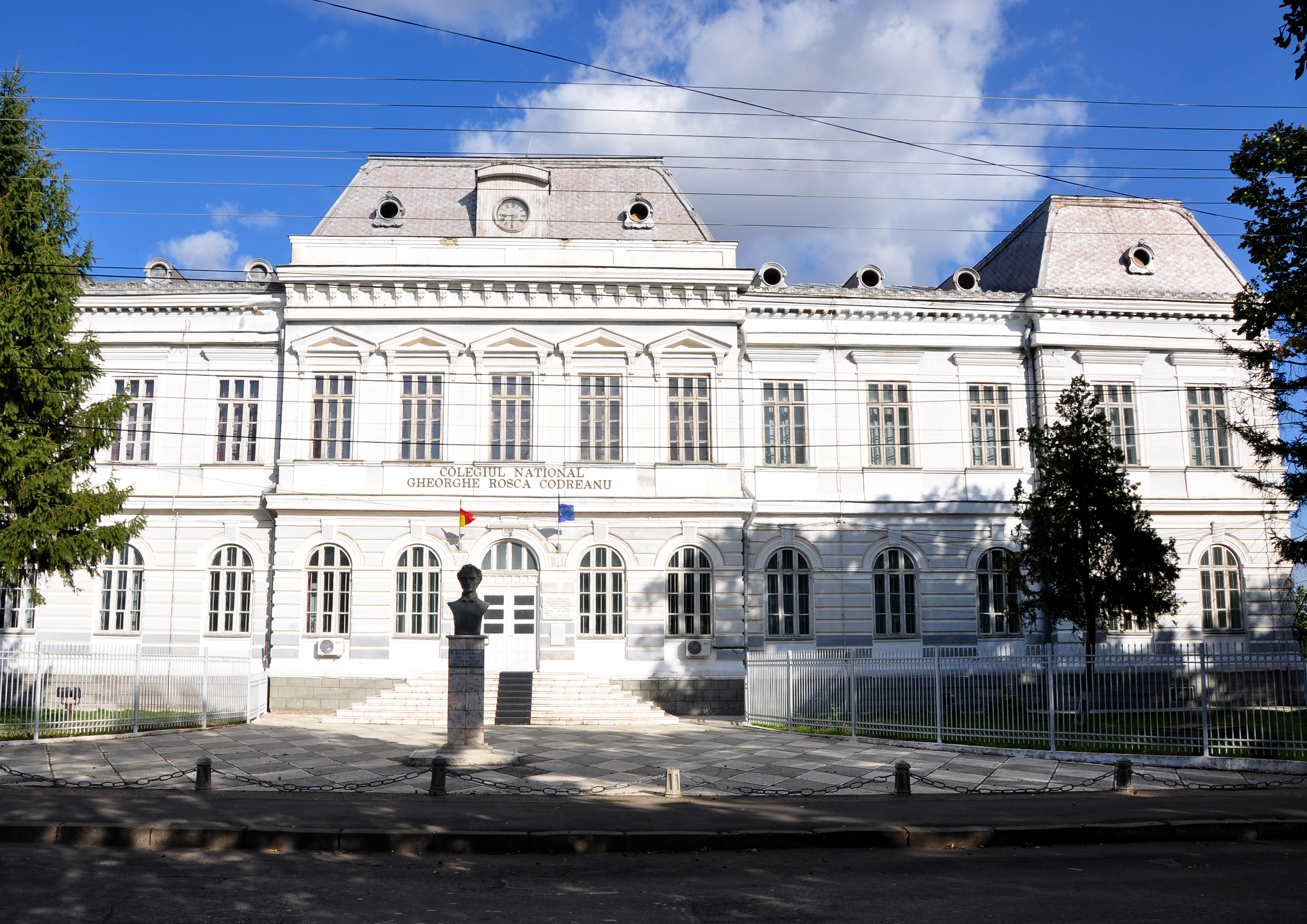
Gheorghe Roșca Codreanu National College

Bârlad features a total number of 43 school units, of which 23 kindergartens, 12 primary and secondary schools, 5 high schools, one vocational school, one music and arts school, an orphanage for preschool children, and one for school children.

All these units are subordinated to the Romanian Ministry of Education.

Education Main high schools are:

- Colegiul Național Gheorge Roșca Codreanu (Gheorghe Roșca Codreanu National College) – the only national college in Vaslui County;
- Liceul Teoretic Mihai Eminescu (Mihai Eminescu Theoretical High School);
- Grupul Școlar Industrial Alexandru Ioan Cuza (Alexandru Ioan Cuza Industrial High School);
- Liceul Tehnologic Petru Rareș (Petru Rareș Technological High School);
- Liceul Pedagogic Ioan Popescu (Ioan Popescu Pedagogical High School).

== International relations ==
=== Twin towns—Sister cities ===
Bârlad is twinned with:

- Vergèze, France
- Konya, Turkey

== Sport ==
"Rulmentul Bârlad" is the city's rugby team, currently playing in the first rugby league in Romania. One of the pioneers of rugby in Romania, the first team was created in 1956 under the name of "Constructorul", meaning "The Builder" in Romanian. "S.C. RULMENȚI S.A. Bârlad" was formed later on in 1962, competing in the first tier of the Romanian rugby division ever since. The team colours are white and blue. Notable performances are the winning of the 1986 and 1987 F.R.R cup (Federația Română de Rugby - The Romanian Rugby Cup).

"Fepa '74 Bârlad" was the city's football team, changing its name to "F.C. Bârlad" shortly after. Its best performance was the promotion in the second tier of the Romanian Football Championship in the mid-1980s.

Football

- FC Bârlad
- Fepa 74 Bârlad
- FC Rulmentul Bârlad

Rugby

- Rulmentul Bârlad

Gymnastics

- CSS Bârlad

Kickboxing

- Scorpions Bârlad

== Gallery ==
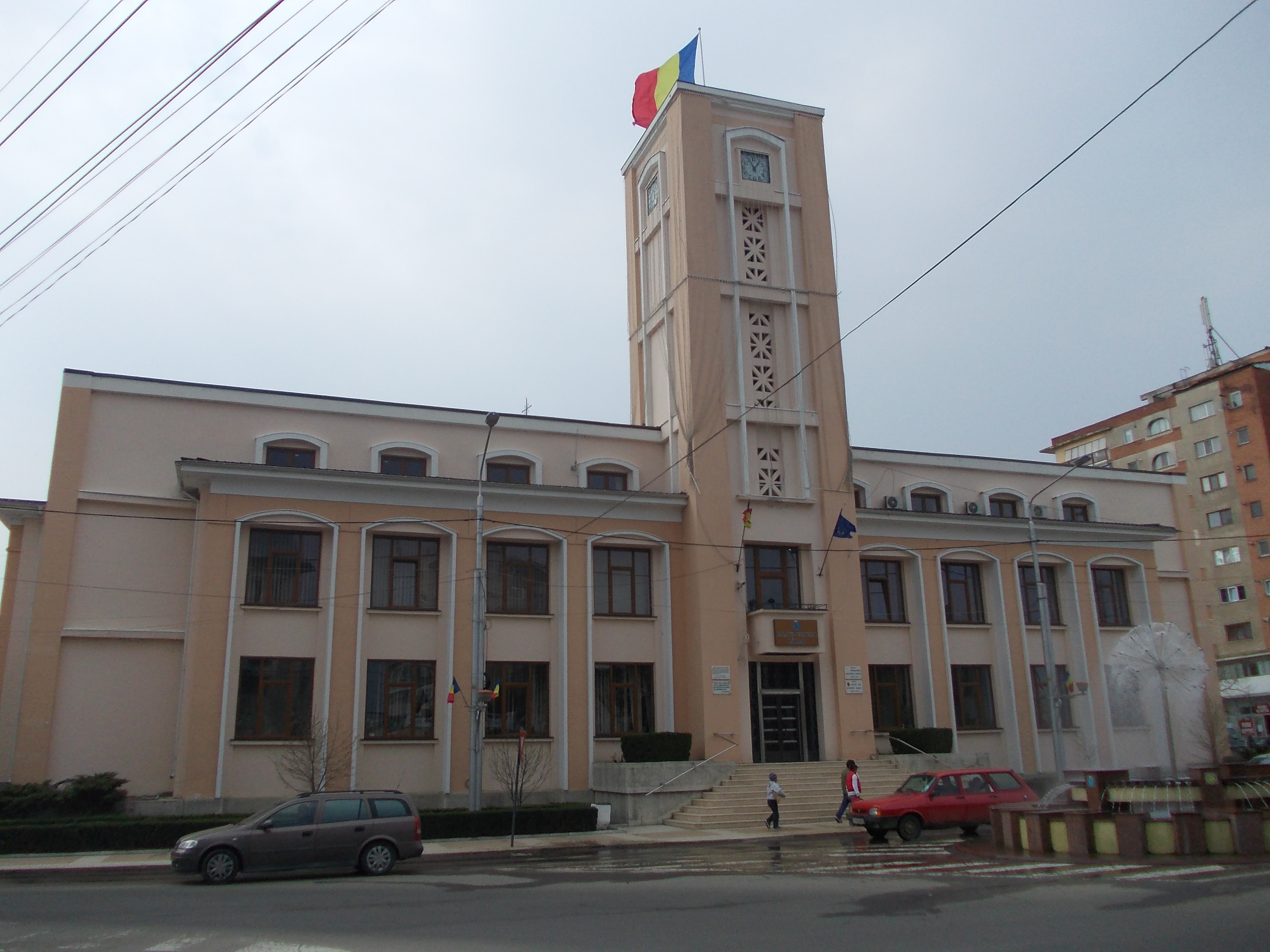
City Hall

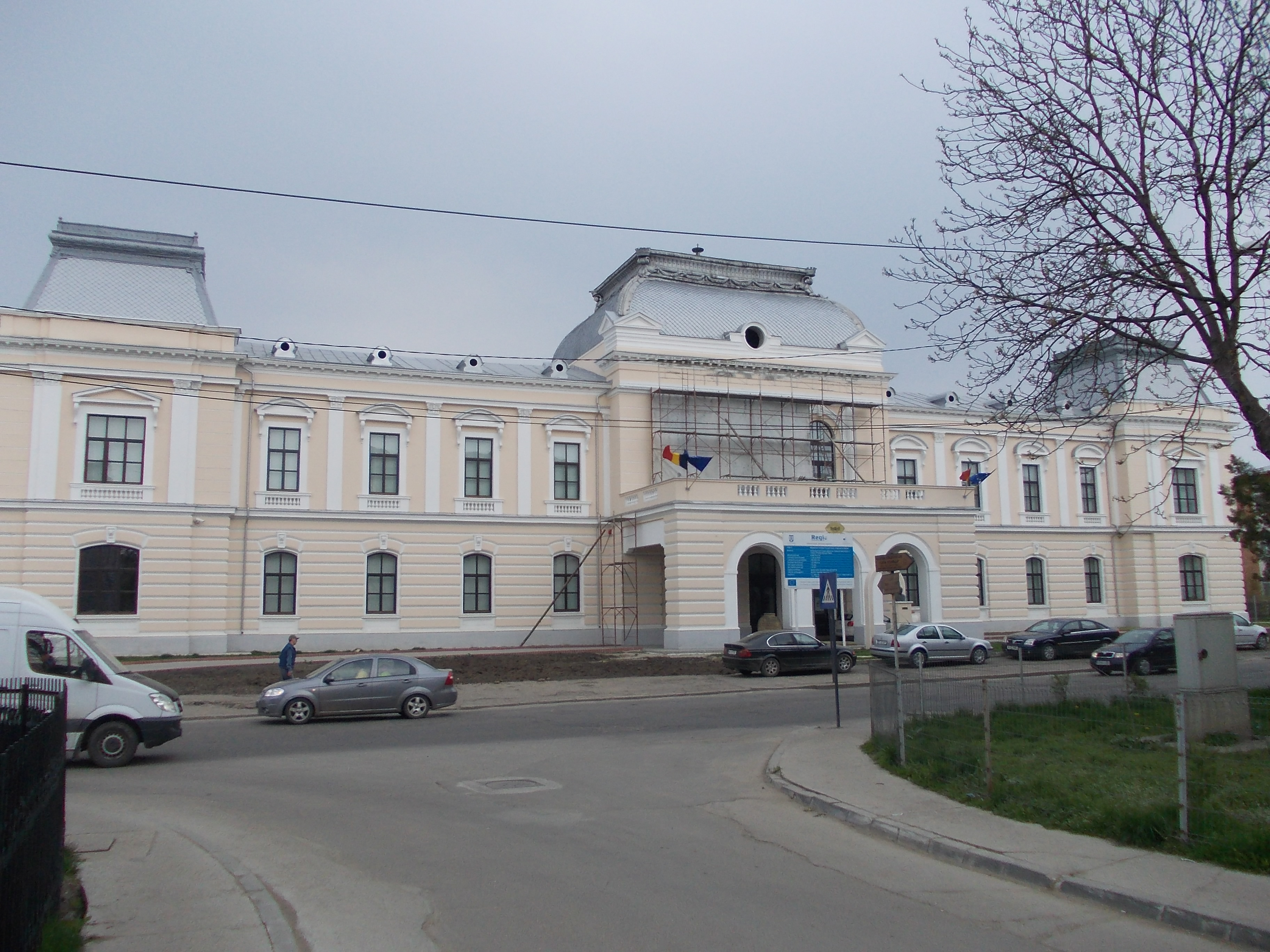
Vasile Pârvan Museum

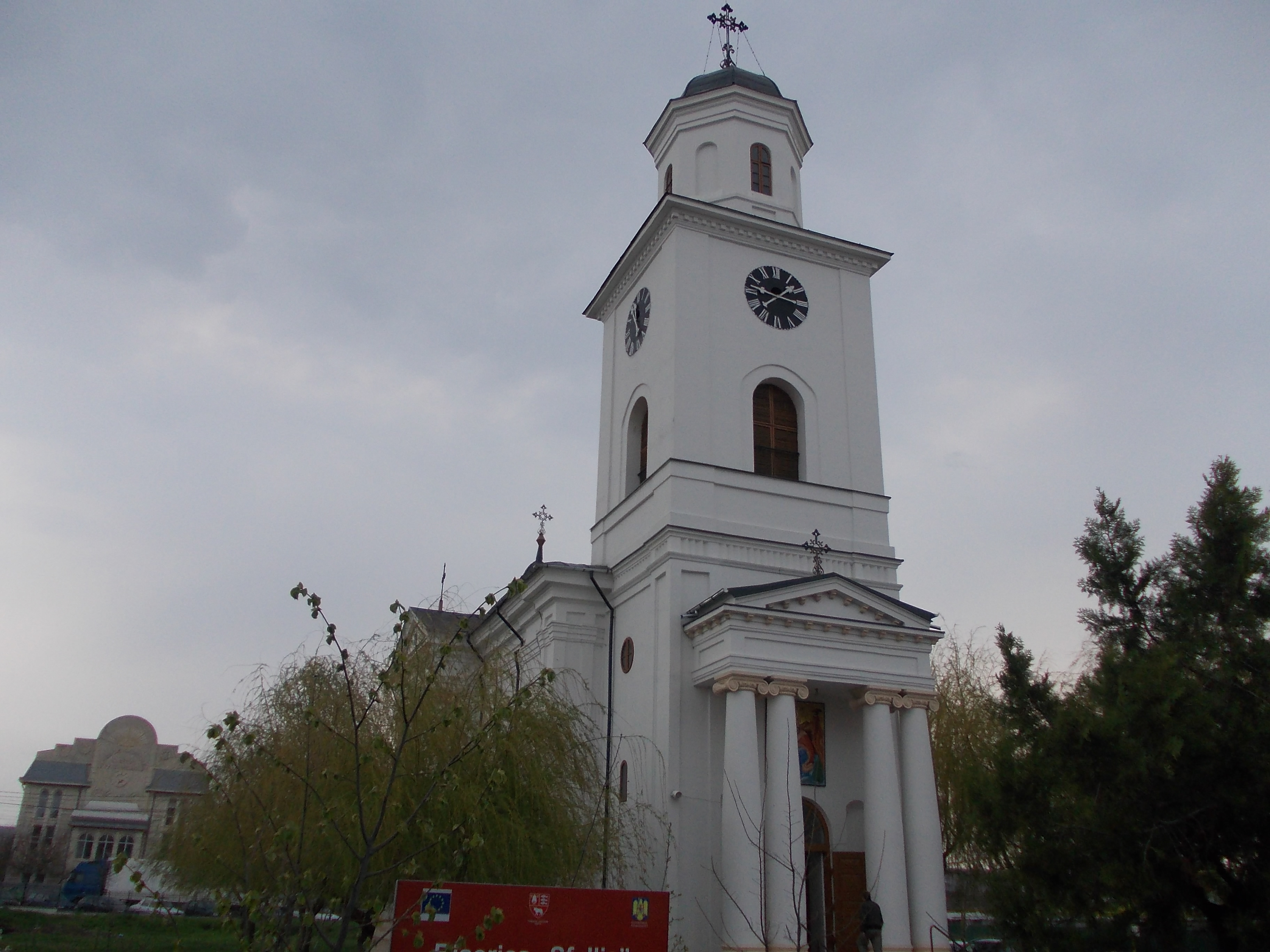
St. Elijah Church

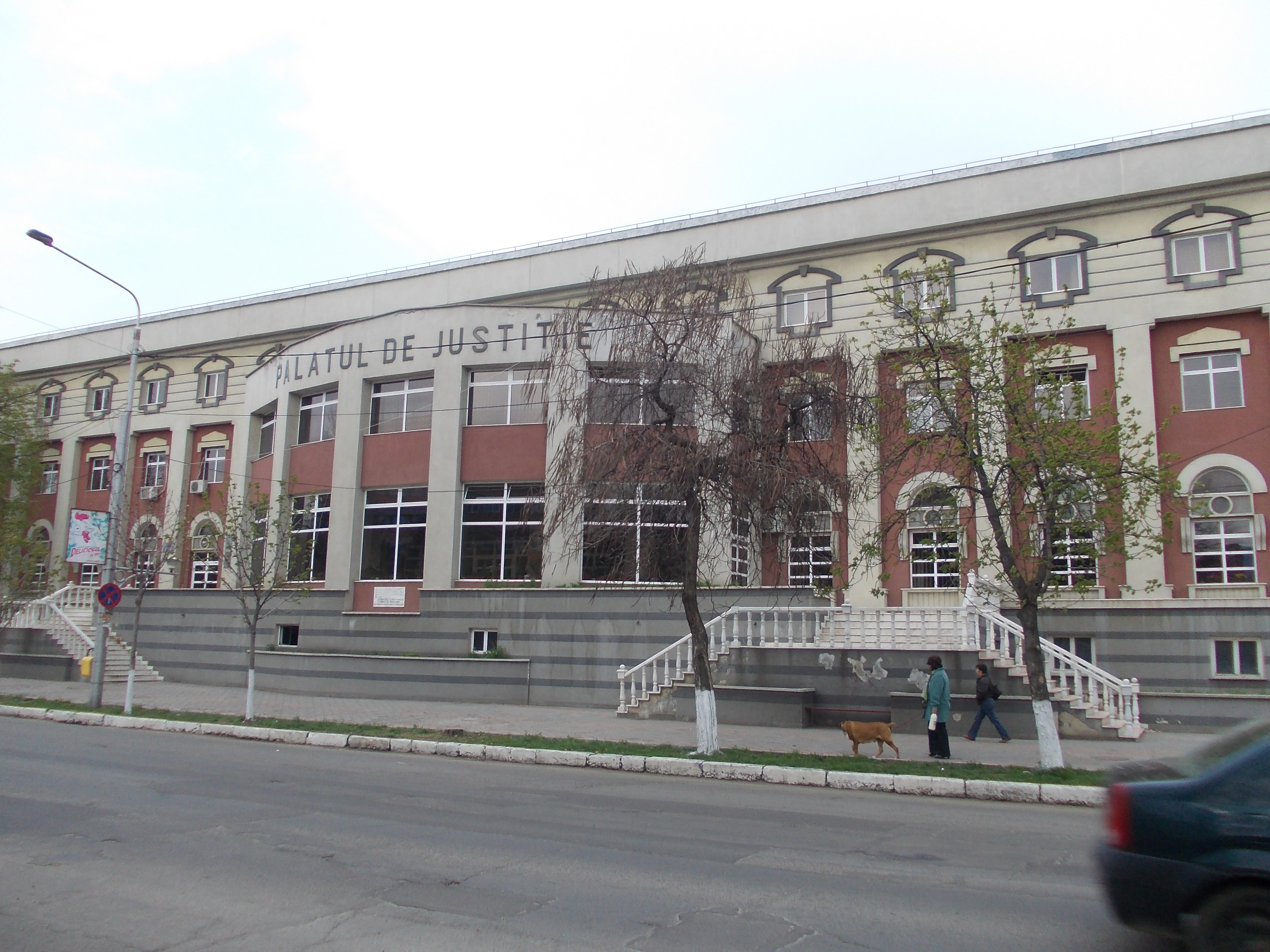
Palace of Justice

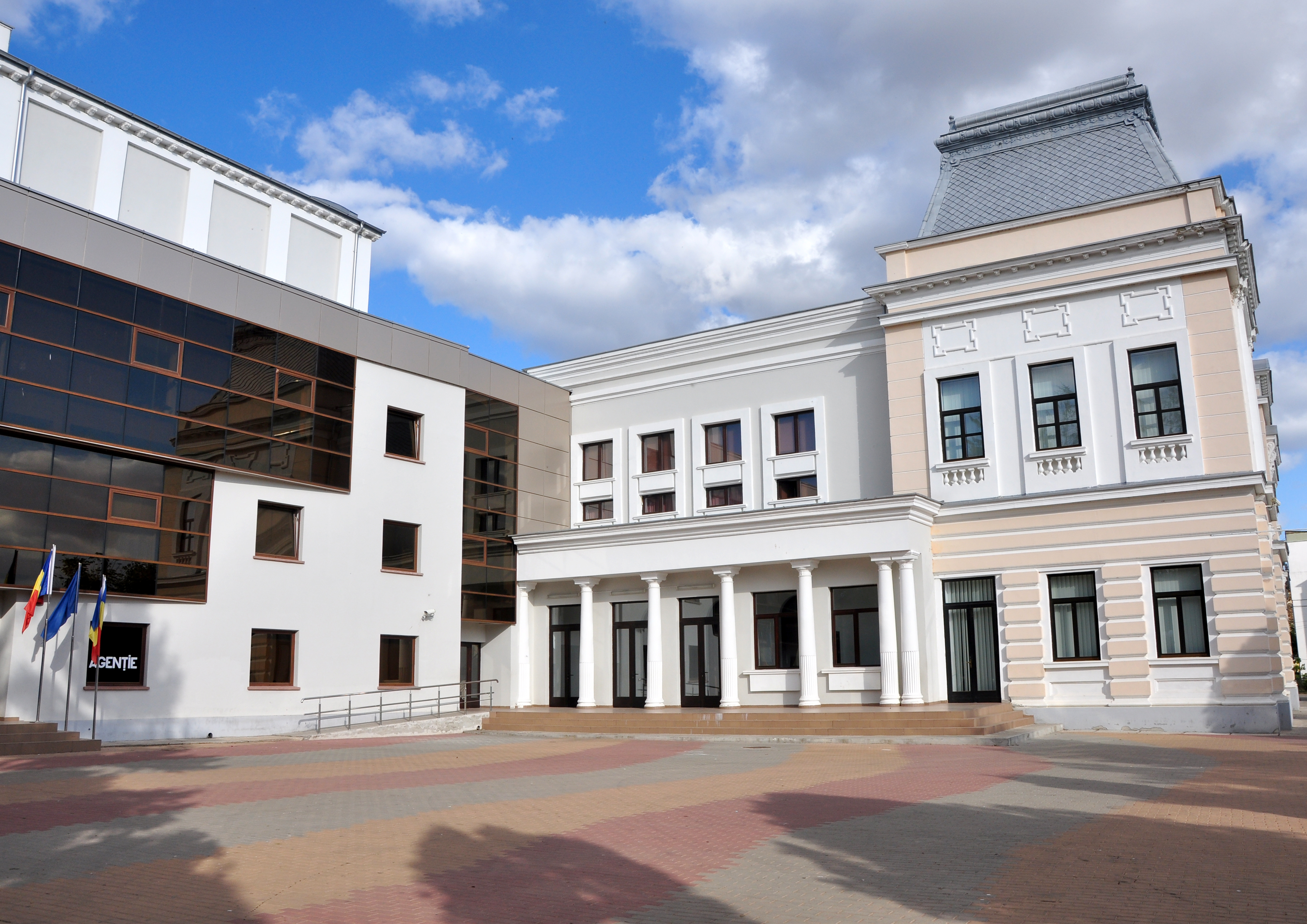
Victor Ion Popa Theatre

== See also ==
- Shale gas in Romania
- Bârlad Ghetto
