= Al. T. Stamatiad =

Romanian poet (1885 - 1955)

Al. T. (Alexandru Teodor Maria) Stamatiad
- Stamatiad in an etching by Constantin Artachino, first published in 1920
- Born: May 9, 1885; Bucharest, Kingdom of Romania
- Died: December 1955 (aged 70); Bucharest, Communist Romania
- Occupations: poet, journalist, translator, playwright, schoolteacher, censor
- Writing career
- Pen name: Adrian Alexandru
- Period: ca. 1903–1945
- Genres: lyric poetry, prose poetry, haiku, fantasy, fable, short story
- Literary movement: Symbolism; Literatorul; Sburătorul

Al. T. Stamatiad (common rendition of Alexandru Teodor Maria Stamatiad, or Stamatiade; May 9, 1885 – December 1955) was a Romanian Symbolist poet, short story writer, and dramatist. A late arrival on the local Symbolist scene, he was primarily active as a literary promoter and, in 1918, editor of Literatorul review. Discovered and praised by Alexandru Macedonski and Ion Minulescu, he combined his presence in radical Symbolist circles with stints on more culturally conservative ones, crossing between the extremes of Romanian literature. By 1911, he had established himself in cultural and social circles as an exotic and vocal, sometimes violent, cultural debater.

Stamatiad's parallel career as a schoolteacher took him to the city of Arad, where he lived at two distinct intervals, animating cultural life in the Romanian circles. Beyond his own poetry and prose, which received mixed reviews, Stamatiad worked on popularizing foreign literature, translating Symbolists such as Maurice Maeterlinck and Charles Baudelaire, but also more traditional works of Omar Khayyám and Li Bai, and experimenting with genres such as haiku. He was generally considered an authority on, and imitator of, Oscar Wilde.

At the center of controversies with Macedonski, and later with the youth at Sburătorul circle, Stamatiad sided with the anti-modernist side of Romanian Symbolism, folding back on conservatism. He faded into relative obscurity during World War II, and lived in isolation and poverty after the establishment of a Romanian communist regime.

== Biography ==
=== Early life ===
Born in Bucharest, Stamatiad(e) was the illegitimate son of Maria Stamatiade and of Lieutenant-Colonel Theodor Pallady. Painter Theodor Iancu Pallady and actress Lucia Sturdza-Bulandra were cousins of his, while Alexandrina Cantacuzino, the feminist campaigner, was a half-sister. Through his paternal grandmother, Alexandru Teodor descended from the prestigious Ghica family, and, according to literary historian George Călinescu, was always overly preoccupied with his origins and his illegitimacy.

The poet used as his full name Alexandru Teodor Maria Stamatiad, including his patronymic, adapted as Teodor (although sometimes shortened to Th., as in Al. Th. Stamatiad). His eccentric styling with the matronymic Maria was a subject of ridicule among his literary peers. To his friends, he interchangeably was Stamatiad or Stamatiade, even as late as 1920. Dropping the final e of his foreign-sounding surname, which most likely indicates a Hellenic heritage, signifies a voluntary Romanianization.

In 1903, at the Kübler Coffeehouse, Stamatiad met Alexandru Macedonski, senior leader of the Romanian Symbolist school. Using the pen name Adrian Alexandru, he made his first contributions to literature in the review Pleiada (1904), then in Ionescu-Caion's literary newspaper, Românul Literar. He was enlisted at a boarding school in the distant city of Iași, while his family remained in Bucharest. Around 1905, he returned to Bucharest, to attend Matei Basarab and Sfântul Gheorghe high schools. He began frequenting the literary club formed at Macedonski's Rafael Street townhouse, where he also introduced two young poets and boarding school mates, Mihail Cruceanu and Eugeniu Sperantia. As noted by Cruceanu, Stamatiad was cultivating valuable connections in the literary press, looking upon his colleagues "with a protective air." Other regulars included Mircea Demetriade, Al. Gherghel, Șerban Bascovici, Donar Munteanu, and critic V. V. Haneș, who was impressed by Stamatiad's self-confidence, which "even seemed a bit too much for his age." Cruceanu also recalls that Stamatiad "never did doubt his significance".

Making his full debut under Macedonski's auspices, Stamatiad was also active in rival Symbolist milieus. Another Symbolist mentor, Ovid Densusianu, hosted his poem, Singurătate ("Solitude"), in the Symbolist tribune Vieața Nouă. In 1906, it also published Stamatiad's versions of Horace's Odes. According to researcher Nicolae Laslo, they read "more like adaptations" than sheer translations, being both simplified and personalized.

Stamatiad and Macedonski continued to correspond even during those periods when Macedonski was out of the country, on a self-imposed exile, while Stamatiad had not yet passed his baccalaureate examination. Together with Cruceanu and Sperantia, he took up the cause of popularizing Macedonski's Symbolism in Henric Streitman's newspaper, Prezentul. Soon, Stamatiad became a favorite among the disciples: Macedonski referred to him as "a very great poet", "brilliant and powerful", seeing him as the Romanian Rollinat. As noted by Călinescu, these were patent exaggerations. Stamatiad, he argues, was in fact "mediocre".

=== At Convorbiri Critice ===
Macedonski continued to tout Stamatiad when the younger poet also joined the Neoclassicists at Convorbiri Critice. At a club session in 1910, Stamatiad, Anastasie Mândru, and I. Dragoslav demanded that Macedonski's work be read and reassessed, thus putting an end to Macedonski's critical marginalization. The circle's leader, Mihail Dragomirescu, allowed Stamatiad to publish in the eponymous magazine, as well as in his other sheet, Falanga Literară și Artistică. Stamatiad was enthusiastically welcomed to the "far left" of Dragomirescu's club by a fellow Symbolist, Ion Minulescu. In 1910, however, Falanga published a heated exchange of messages between Stamatiad and Minulescu, over the issue of Minulescu's rivalry with another Symbolist, N. Davidescu.

Like Minulescu, Stamatiad also courted the traditionalist, nominally anti-Symbolist, camp, publishing works in Sămănătorul review. According to nationalist culture critic and Sămănătorul contributor Nicolae Iorga, Stamatiad's presence there indicated that the magazine was yet "unclear" in its direction: Stamatiad could contribute, even if "the magazine's ideology was indifferent to him, if not indeed hostile to him." Another reading is provided by literary historian Paul Cernat, who sees Stamatiad's participation in traditionalism as indicative of "an split identity within the 'conservative' side of local Symbolism." At the other end of the political spectrum, Stamatiad also cultivated a friendship with the socialist poet-publicist Vasile Demetrius, who featured his poetry in the review Viața Socială. In 1909, Stamatiad was a registered witness at Demetrius' civil wedding ceremony (another was critic Ilarie Chendi).

With such universal backing, he put out his first volume of verse, Din trâmbițe de aur ("With Trumpets of Gold"). Although it went through four editions between 1910 and 1931, and was reviewed with sympathy by Haneș, the work was not popular with most critics. It rather made Stamatiad the object of derision in the literary circles. Stamatiad persevered and worked with dramatist Constantin Râuleț on the play Femei ciudate ("Strange Women"), published in Convorbiri Critice in November 1910, and as a volume in 1911. It was first staged in Bucharest by the "Modern Theater" company of Alexandru Davila. The text intrigued the public with its frank display of a sexual masochism disorder; according to Dragomirescu, it is "well written, but strange." In 1912 and 1913, Stamatiad completed and published translations from Maurice Maeterlinck's plays: Intruder, Interior, The Blind. They were all grouped together, as the "Cycle-of-Death" plays, in a 1914 edition at Cultura Națională publishers.

As early as August 1909, Stamatiad also rallied with Emil Gârleanu's Romanian Writers' Society (SSR), with which he toured the Romanian-speaking communities of Austria-Hungary. On Thomas Sunday 1911, Romanian activists in the then-Hungarian city of Arad welcomed him to a "literary workshop". An official banquet was held at the White Cross Hotel. Stamatiad's visit took place in the midst of political crisis: the territorial National Romanian Party of Transylvania had split into two wings, of which the conservative one, well-represented in Arad, made efforts to appease the Hungarian administration. Stamatiad and the other arrivals stood accused of pushing the irredentist cause, but they denied this was the case, publishing an explanatory open letter.

He diversified his contributions to the Symbolist literary press, rallying with Densusianu's Versuri și Proză circle and having some of his poetry published in Simbolul. He also founded a single-issue magazine, Grădina Hesperidelor ("Garden of the Hesperides"). Remembered for its promotion of Art Nouveau aesthetics, it featured reviews of Din trâmbițe de aur by Densusianu, Dragomirescu, and Chendi, as well as articles or poems by Bascovici, Dimitrie Anghel, Alfred Hefter-Hidalgo, I. M. Rașcu, and Barbu Solacolu.

=== Between Literatorul and Sburătorul ===
In 1914, having graduated in literature from the University of Bucharest, Stamatiad was named professor of French in Arad, followed by a post in Bucharest. In January of the next year, he and Minulescu were among the newly elected members of the SSR Committee. As Macedonski's right hand, and as a regular of coffeehouses and bars such as Kübler and Casa Capșa, Stamatiad became a legendary figure in bohemian circles, involved in cultural disputes as well as brawls. Cartoonist Neagu Rădulescu describes Stamatiad at this moment in time: "Al. T. Stamatiad, with his mustache curled up to the brim of his hat, with his cane in 'shoulder position', could not be resisted by any young lady." According to Macedonski's novelist friend, I. Peltz, he was a spectacular presence on their circle: contentious, even "furious" and "terrorizing", lacking literary value, but forcing his pupils to read his work in class. Peltz writes that the only other person who could stand up to him was a Stan Palanca, the perennially unemployed poet-bohemian.

World War I interfered with both Stamatiad's career and his affiliations: unlike the increasingly conservative and Germanophile Macedonski, Stamatiad supported the Entente Powers. He was a refugee in Moldavia during southern Romania's occupation by the Central Powers. Returning to Iași, which he called "the holy citadel of my Motherland", he began work on a series of religious and wartime patriotic pieces, called Pe drumul Damascului ("On the Road to Damascus"). Still active in the literary circles, and writing for the nationalist review România, he became involved in the cultural scene of neighboring Bessarabia, supporting her union with Romania after January 1918. In March, as the Moldavian Democratic Republic effected this union, Stamatiad was also a SSR delegate to the Chișinău celebrations, where he met composer George Enescu.

After the 1918 peace agreement, Stamatiad restored his links with the Symbolists in Bucharest, which was still administrated by the Central Powers. When Macedonski's Literatorul reappeared there in summer 1918, several months before the sudden end of occupation, Stamatiad agreed to act as editor-in-chief. He worked intensely on publishing a dossier of favorable replies to Macedonski's poems, with the goal of restoring his mentor's reputation (the project was discreetly managed by Macedonski himself). Stamatiad enlisted literary contributions from Peltz (who also helped edit the magazine), Demetrius, and Tudor Vianu.

Nonetheless, Stamatiad soon renounced his Literatorul position, following a political dispute with Macedonski. Specifically, he asked Macedonski not to publish a praise of the military governor, August von Mackensen, but found himself ignored. A parting letter from Macedonski shows that they could not agree over "what [Stamatiad] calls patriotism", and rejects all of Stamatiad's suggestions about maintaining a low profile. The dispute was amiable, with Macedonski implying that Stamatiad could always return to Literatorul if he so wished. Peltz, who left at the same time as Stamatiad, also disavowed Macedonski's initiative, calling it "inane". The magazine soon went out of print—according to Iorga, the "shame" of Mackensen's homage piece "could not be washed off". The friendship was not mended before Macedonski's death in December 1920, but Stamatiad remained in correspondence with the writer's eldest son, Nikita Macedonski; one such letter includes a full and early account of the circumstances in which Macedonski died.

After parting with Literatorul, Stamatiad became one of the old-school Symbolists affiliated with the generic-modernist review Sburătorul, whose editor was critic Eugen Lovinescu. His presence there was often a disturbance for other members, including Lovinescu and Felix Aderca. His colleagues found him too preoccupied with his posterity, and too edgy at club sessions, but welcomed him as a picturesque figure. After planning, together with Ion Pillat, a never-completed anthology of international Symbolism, Stamatiad returned to the literary scene of Greater Romania in 1918, with the plaquette Mărgăritare negre ("Black Pearls"), illustrated by Iosif Iser. He also resumed his teaching career, and, after the repressed strike of December 1918, personally expelled revolutionary socialist students such as Belu Zilber from his school.

=== 1920s ===
Following Transylvania's unification with Romania, Stamatiad made his return to Arad, where, in 1920, he worked as a government censor for the daily Românul. That year, the printing press of Arad Bishopric put out a new edition of Mărgăritare negre, featuring Constantin Artachino's portrait of Stamatiad. In 1921, the textbook publishing company, Casa Școalelor, issued a volume of his short stories, or "parables", as Cetatea cu porțile închise ("The Inaccessible Citadel"). It was followed in 1923 by a definitive edition of Pe drumul Damascului, with the subtitle "Religious Poetry". That year, he joined the SSR's Liviu Rebreanu, Eugeniu Botez, I. A. Bassarabescu, as well as Pillat and Vianu, on a literary tour of the newly attached provinces. Stamatiad continued testing his abilities as a translator. His early contributions were selections of prose poetry and aphorisms by the Symbolist forerunner Charles Baudelaire, published as a volume by Adevărul newspaper. He followed up with a Cartea Românească selection from Oscar Wilde (which featured Stamatiad's version of The Ballad of Reading Gaol), and then with a 1923 reissue of Maeterlinck's "Cycle-of-Death".

Together with his old friend Davidescu, Stamatiad took over artistic leadership over the Bucharest magazine Flacăra, in its new edition of May 1922, and gave it a Symbolist agenda. He was intensely involved in the literary life of the old and new Romanian provinces, from Transylvania to Northern Dobruja, allowing his poems to be hosted by numerous (if short-lived) regional magazines. Translations of his poetry saw print in the Arad Hungarophone modernist tribune, Fekete Macska. Later, as a regular of Tiberiu Vuia's Înnoirea circle, Stamatiad became known not just as one of Arad's leading Romanian poets, but also as one who strengthened the Romanian side in the "culture war" with Regency Hungary. He was at the time married to the visual artist Letiția Dumitrescu (born 1879 or 1880), with whom he attended the major cultural and social events of western Transylvania.

While teaching at the Moise Nicoară High School in Arad in 1925, he put out his own review, Salonul Literar ("The Literary Salon"). It was only in print until May 1926, but made a mark on the local literary scene. Overall, Salonul Literar looked back to the age of Denusianu and Macedonski, with additional contributions from Demetrius, Minulescu, Gherghel, and Mihail Celarianu. It also hosted pieces by, among other, the Arad modernists Aron Cotruș (young Transylvania's "most talented poet", according to Stamatiad) and Perpessicius, and the traditionalist Gheorghe Bogdan-Duică. Salonul Literar had Stamatiad himself for a literary reviewer, columnist, and ideologue; as literary historians note, he aimed to copy Macedonski's leadership style. He translated and published lyrical pieces by his usual references, Baudelaire and Wilde, but also from Guillaume Apollinaire and Villiers de l'Isle Adam. Stamatiad's contribution to criticism, however, was a relative failure, according to philologist Ion Mierluțiu: Stamatiad gave poor reviews to Lucian Blaga, but was enthusiastic about Marcel Romanescu.

Also in Arad, Stamatiad published a series of essays and memoirs popularizing the work of several poets, from Iuliu Cezar Săvescu and Octavian Goga to Maeterlinck. Another selection of his own poetry was issued by Casa Școalelor in 1926, as Poezii ("Poems"). By the late 1920s, Stamatiad's work as a translator concentrated on the classics of Persian literature and Chinese poetry. In 1927, Ritmul Vremii newspaper featured his selections from Omar Khayyám's Quatrains (other such translations had been put out, in other newspapers, by Emanoil Bucuța and Zaharia Stancu).

=== 1930s and World War II ===
Stamatiad's full Khayyám translations were published as a volume in 1932, at Cartea Românească, followed, the next year, by an anthology of Li Bai's poems, 36 of which had been hosted by Convorbiri Literare in its October 1932 issue. He was under contract with Romanian Radio, where, despite having a "cracking" voice, he recorded readings of his own poems. The literary magazine Viața Românească gave them a sarcastic reception, calling his reading an "Orphic" feast of "flutes and trumpets", and implied that Stamatiad should not have ever been allowed airtime.

Stamatiad's career peaked in the later interwar period, when he was honored with several prizes by the SSR and the Romanian Academy. In 1936, Adevărul published, as a standalone brochure, his Peisagii sentimentale ("Sentimental Landscapes"). A year later, Dem. Bassarabeanu issued a critical review of his entire work, thought to have been the only one such monograph in existence before 2002. Stamatiad was awarded the National Poetry Prize in 1938, and had "definitive editions" of Cetatea cu porțile închise and Pe drumul Damascului republished by Casa Școalelor. The latter came out with a set of illustrations by Mina Byck Wepper. In 1939, Stamatiad produced his own version of the Chinese poets' anthology, The Jade Flute; it brought together disparate pieces that had seen print in Mihail Sadoveanu's Însemnări Ieșene review during 1935 and 1936.

By then, the old Symbolists were losing favor with the modernist youth. His sympathetic reviewer, V. Jeleru, complained in 1943 that "Mr. Al. T. Stamatiad no longer seems to be as appreciated as is deserved by the younger writers and readers of poetry. They look upon him with an infantile superiority, even though they only address him publicly as 'maestro'." Stamatiad was in particular adverse to the radical modernist "new poetry", cultivated by Lovinescu at Sburătorul, and, modernist writer Barbu Brezianu contends, stood on the "far right" of literature, in a "grand conservative party" that variously included Sadoveanu, Paul Zarifopol, and D. Nanu. Another young writer, Pericle Martinescu, believed the old but "child-like" Stamatiad a "survivor from another era", although he respected his expertise on Wilde's work. This same was noted by C. D. Fortunescu. He called Stamatiad a "valuable" Wilde translator, but also "the unique specimen left around from a vanished type of bohemian Bucharest knighthood", with "a dated mustache and four-in-hand necktie". Martinescu visited the Stamatiads at their apartment in the Foișorul de Foc area, near the Greek Church of the Annunciation. Their place, he recalled, was untidy and disappointing, showing that, far from being a free-spirited poet, Stamatiad was "riddled with the boredom of family life".

The start of World War II brought the Soviet occupation of Bessarabia and Northern Transylvania's transfer to Hungary, as well as Romania's fascist alliance with the Axis powers. Stamatiad was grieved and confused by the situation: he organized the Anglophile intellectual circle at Nestor Coffeehouse, but also preached support for Nazi Germany; the Germans, Stamatiad claimed, were to give Romania back "all the territories she lost". As noted by sociologist Nicolae Petrescu, who was in the audience, Stamatiad was "as always, incapable of putting things in perspective"; "nobody even took his statements seriously." In 1941, Ion Antonescu's regime clamped down on the Nestor circle; Stamatiad's colleague Șerban Cioculescu, who was also a member of the National Peasants' Party, narrowly escaped deportation for his involvement in such activities.

A collection of Stamatiad's best poems came out in 1943, at Editura Fundațiilor Regale, under the title Cortegiul amintirilor ("The Cortege of Memories"). Additionally, he worked on translations which reflected the new political trends. Also in 1943, he published Eșarfe de mătase ("Silk Scarves") one of Romania's earliest selections of Japanese poetry. Japanese mannerisms had preoccupied Stamatiad for some years, and Peisagii sentimentale comprised some of his own haiku (and, to a lesser degree, senryū). He had unsuccessfully approached Editura Vremea with a collection of tanka attributed to "Japanese courtesans", possibly loose adaptations of the honkadori format. Eșarfe de mătase comprised 200 pieces in indirect translation from French. It sampled not just haiku and tanka, but also nagauta texts, with highlights from the legendary Susanoo and the historical Ki no Tsurayuki. Some of its modern-era inclusions were Matsuo Bashō, Yokoi Yayū, Kobayashi Issa, and contemporaries such as Akiko Yosano and Horiguchi Daigaku.

=== Final years ===
Shortly after the King Michael Coup took Romania out of the Axis, the Romanian Academy awarded him one of the Ion Heliade Rădulescu Awards for 1944, in recognition of Eșarfe de mătase. His rapporteur was Constantin Rădulescu-Motru, standing in for the recently deceased Pillat. Stamatiad's final anthology was a 1945 Din poezia americană ("Selections of American Poetry"). His rendition of Edgar Allan Poe's The Raven, originally published by Revista Fundațiilor Regale, was the only one of 18 such translations to be written in free verse. It therefore bypassed the difficulties of rendering Poe's meter into readable Romanian.

By the war's end, and the gradual imposition of a communist regime, Stamatiad was occasionally involved in dialogue with the various ethnic minorities. As noted by writer Ion Călugăru, Stamatiad was one of the few participants in this effort who were not representing the communist movement. In old age, he began a process of minutely recording and cataloging his contacts with other figures on the literary scene, in private notebooks and dossiers. His wife Letiția died in 1952. According to writer Gheorghe Grigurcu, who sought his company in November 1954, Stamatiad was living, in noticeable poverty, at his old Foișorul de Foc apartment. Grigurcu also recalls that the aged poet, his personal hero, had trouble breathing and speaking, and could not honor his request for information: "Stamatiad was by then a ghostly character, a lyrical hidalgo of yore, returning among us in his unappealing, suffering, stage, his shoulder still held stiff with pride, with a Poesque Raven quothing a barely audible Nevermore."

Stamatiad reportedly died in December 1955, although his death date is often recorded as 1956. Rumor spread in the literary community that he had spent his last months bedridden, helpless against visitors who stole his more valuable possessions. His notebooks were posthumously recovered by researcher Mihai Apostol, who published them, together with Stamatiad's letters, in a 2002 set of volumes.

== Work ==
Călinescu describes two sources for Stamatiad's own brand of Symbolism: on one hand, the "grandiloquent" form of Oscar Wilde, Dimitrie Anghel, Ștefan Petică, and a young Ion Pillat; on the other, the "euphoric" aesthetics cultivated by Macedonski's circle. Contrary to Stamatiad's nods to Baudelaire, Călinescu assesses, actual Baudelaireian influences were largely absent from Stamatiad's true work. Likewise, Perpessicius ties Stamatiad more to the "orator" tradition of Macedonski than to any other recognized influence. Observing such traits, Eugen Lovinescu noted that, despite his use of neologisms, free verse, and other modern devices, Stamatiad was in fact an old-generation Romantic.

Stamatiad's early work is largely focused on amorous themes, often depicting affairs as a struggle of character, or an agony. According to Lovinescu: "Mr. Al. T. Stamatiad's sensitivity has a short path to follow: a violent outburst, followed by a moral breakdown." Unlike his mentor Macedonski, who was "saddened by the indifference of his contemporaries", Stamatiad "expressed the joy of being a Poet", of having "conquered" his place in life. This belief in his own artistic mission, Călinescu suggests, was "illusory", leading Stamatiad to invent himself a literary persona and a "boisterous" love-life; but it also produced "a likable psychology", with "fragments of genuine literary interest". He cites as evidence one of Stamatiad's Christian-themed reveries:

Am ridicat un templu — minune de minune —
Întreg este din aur și pietre nestimate,
Cu turnurile mândre, vederea ți-o răpune;
Când îl privesc păgânii, spun vorbe blestemate!

Cu porțile de-aramă, cu treptele de-agată,
Icoane pretutindeni și-aceeași în tot locul,
În miile de candeli sfios clipește focul,
Vibrarea de miresme te leagănă, te-mbată.

Translation:

I worked on a temple — o wonder of wonders —
Entirely of gold and of most precious stones,
Its towers standing tall, the sight of which astounds;
Pagans that gaze upon it will surely end up cursing!

Beyond its copper gates, and its agate stairs,
There's icons everyone, and one throughout the place,
A gentle fire shimmers, in the thousand candles,
A swelling vibe of odors will cradle and besot you.

Stamatiad was more appreciated for his contemplative poems, including the pastel Noapte ("Night"), seen by Dragomirescu as a small masterpiece. Călinescu writes that Stamatiad's work comprises mentionable "psalms": although lacking "deep mysticism", such poems may unintentionally remind one of Paul Claudel and Charles Péguy. They earned full praise from Perpessicius, who noted their "great simplicity" and "innocence", and even from Iorga, who noted their "beautiful dedication" to war-torn Romania, with echoes from "the great Belgian Verhaeren". Lovinescu voices a distinct opinion, viewing the psalms as "merely a stylistic exercise", "programmatic", "in facsimile" to the classics of religious poetry.

The fantasy prose poetry of Cetatea cu porțile închise is heavily indebted to Oscar Wilde's "gracious infatuation", but, Călinescu argues, is generally humorless. Essentially fables discussing each an archetype (The Gardner, The Three Princesses, The White Deer, The Bird-catcher, Happiness, The White Ghost, The Stonemason), they are described by Fortunescu as a major accomplishment: "the poems comprised in this volume display a rare stylistic mastery and verbal richness."
