= I. M. Rașcu =

Romanian writer (1890 - 1971)

I. M. Rașcu (most common rendition of Ion Rașcu; March 31 [O.S. March 19] 1890 – 1971) was a Romanian poet of Symbolist verse, cultural promoter, comparatist, and schoolteacher. He is remembered for his participation in the Romanian Symbolist movement: a founder and co-editor, with Alfred Hefter-Hidalgo, of Versuri și Proză magazine, he became one of the leading Symbolist figures in his native city of Iași before 1914. In later years, he lived more discreetly as a scholar and educationist, earning both praise and opprobrium for his sternness and erudition.

A Catholic convert and devotional writer, Rașcu spent several years in France. He made a belated attempt to revive Symbolism with the 1930s magazine Îndreptar, where he also published his Catholic prose and fragments of his work in literary history. He became noted, and challenged, for his critical reviews of Mihai Eminescu's poetry. His late works in travel literature document his increasing isolation and monastic fervor, as well as his dedication to Saint Thérèse of Lisieux. In his final years, Rașcu returned to literary life as an authority on, and biographer of, his Symbolist colleagues.

== Biography ==
=== Origins and early years ===
Rașcu's maternal great-grandfather was the French upper class tailor Frédéric Ortgies (described in one of Rașcu's poems as having "a rosy and melancholy face"). Originally from Picardy, he settled in Moldavia before its 1859 merger into Romania. Ortgies' daughter, Eugenia, married Ioan Tudor Curie (or Curius; 1816–1898), an actor and French-language teacher from Wallachia. Curie had once been the most promising graduate of the Wallachian Philharmonic Society, and friend of its founder Costache Aristia, before leaving to join the French Foreign Legion. He settled in Iași, where he played a minor part in the 1848 upheaval, and afterward spent years in exile. Their daughter, Clelia (1865–1950), was Rașcu's mother. His father, born in Odobești, worked as an art and calligraphy teacher. The couple also had three daughters, of whom Clelia (1897–1944) went on to marry University of Iași physician Emil Hurmuzache; and another son, Gheorghe, who made his living as a teacher of geography.

Also a Iași native, Ion Rașcu was raised Romanian Orthodox, but later in life returned to the religion of his French forefathers, joining the Roman Catholic Church. In Catholic circles, he was remembered as "one of our great converts", on par with missionary Vladimir Ghika and author Mariu Theodorian-Carada. As argued by literary historian Paul Cernat, this evidenced a "propensity toward 'alternative' spirituality and a tense relationship with the dominant Orthodox religion", also found among Symbolists who turned to Theosophy, heresy, or occult practices. Rașcu was entirely committed to his new faith: he is described by critic George Călinescu as a Catholic of "fanatical correctness", "discretion", and "great suaveness", and by philologist Adrian Marino as one who suggested "all sorts of anachronisms", "fervent and very fanatical", but "distinguished", "of an entirely Westernized urbanity". He is also remembered for his withdrawals into mystical contemplation, and for his adhering to an austere dress code in his daily life.

Rașcu attended primary and secondary school in Iași, living with his family on the outskirts of that city. As he himself recounted in later years, the monotonous atmosphere of the Moldavian fin de siècle, the sentiment that something was about to happen "in the world at large", made a mark on him: "Perhaps it is that we waited for the age to weight less on us, but to shake us more violently." Rașcu debuted in 1905 in the student review Spre Lumină. His contributions were a poem, expressing Rașcu's sadness over the recent death of his father, a conventional sonnet, and a brief overview of Aromanian folkloric laments. He sent additional pieces to the popular magazine Duminica, using the pen names I. Cimbru-Frăgar, I. Ieronim, I. Rașcu-Ieronim, I. Ieronim-Cimbru, and some variations of these. As Evandru, he also contributed to the political newspaper Opinia, owned by Alexandru Bădărău. Graduating from the National High School in 1909, he took a diploma in Letters from the University of Iași.

=== Versuri și Proză ===
Rașcu's debut as a Symbolist promoter came in 1911, when he founded at Iași the review Versuri ("Verse"). Reappearing as Versuri și Proză ("Verse and Prose") from 1912 to 1916, it was to be Moldavia's longest-lived Symbolist magazine. Rașcu, the chief editor, often signed his contributions with pseudonyms, introducing himself as M. Zopir, I.M.R., Ev., or just E. He was seconded by Alfred Hefter-Hidalgo, who was the group's theoretician and staff critic.

Heavily influenced by the Symbolist critic Ovid Densusianu, Versuri și Proză was quite successful in attracting other Symbolist authors: Mihail Cruceanu, N. Davidescu, Benjamin Fondane, Al. T. Stamatiad, Ion Minulescu, Claudia Millian, Nicolae Budurescu, Eugeniu Sperantia, Tudor Arghezi, Adrian Maniu, Barbu Solacolu, Mihail Codreanu, Dragoș Protopopescu, Constantin T. Stoika, Perpessicius, Felix Aderca, Alexandru Vițianu, and (with early selections from his influential Plumb) George Bacovia. More senior Symbolists such as Densusianu and Alexandru Macedonski were also present, as were the generic modernists Hortensia Papadat-Bengescu, Cezar Petrescu, F. Brunea-Fox, and Vasile Demetrius.

Iași being a city of traditionalist tastes, and primarily a center for the ruralizing Poporanist movement, this Symbolist activation caused a stir. As an additional mark of rebellion, Densusianu was invited by Rașcu in Iași, where he gave a public lecture against Poporanist tenets. The magazine's printing shop put out copies of Rașcu's own poetry, as Sub cupole de vis ("Under the Domes of Reverie"). In the closing months of 1912, Rașcu and Hefter-Hidalgo also contributed to Simbolul, the Symbolist review put out in Bucharest by Tristan Tzara. Rașcu popularized the work of French poets and novelists, beginning with his translations of Albert Samain's Polyphème and Marcel Schwob's La croisade des infants. Hefter-Hidalgo, whose Romanian Jewish ethnicity underlined the tolerant and non-traditional character of Versuri și Proză, introduced the public to Remy de Gourmont, Stuart Merrill, Gustave Kahn, and the erotic works of Pierre Louÿs.

The Poporanist reaction bordered on censorship. Among the rival literary columnists, August Scriban referred to Rașcu as "ruddy, long-haired and repulsive", while Gheorghe Bogdan-Duică dismissed Versuri și Proză as the "insolence of the impotent". After public readings from Rașcu and Codreanu's poetry, unknown authors resorted to putting out a parody of Versuri și Proză, with so-called "verse from the netherworld". According to Călinescu, these parodists were "talentless", but also showed "common sense".

In actuality, Versuri și Proză was not entirely opposed to traditionalist literature. According to Cernat, it should be read as a "non-exclusive" publication, "in a gradual—and discreet—evolution into modernism." It even dedicated special issues to Poporanists such as Garabet Ibrăileanu, Mihail Sadoveanu, and Octav Băncilă, and was thus more mainstream than two other Iași reviews (Eugen Relgis' Fronda, Isac Ludo's Absolutio). At times, the opposition was explicit. Writing for Versuri și Proză in 1914, Hefter-Hidalgo ridiculed the more radical, post-Symbolist, movements, with reference to Futurism or Simultanism, but explored the possibility of staging in Iași the Expressionist work of Frank Wedekind. Hefter and Rașcu both set out to distinguish between the Decadent movement and Symbolism. Hefter acknowledged the traditionalist dislike for decadent themes and their surfacing in Symbolism, but contended that Symbolist art was fundamentally new, idealistic, and infinitely beautiful. For his part, Rașcu objected to what he saw as exaggerated Poporanism, noting that the "sickness" of Decadence was not necessarily bad, since: "Not all sick things are repugnant."

Marginally affiliated with Densusianu's Vieața Nouă circle before 1915, Rașcu had his work published in various other Symbolist periodicals in the capital city, Bucharest. His work was taken up by Noua Revistă Română, Avântul, Farul, and by Stamatiad's Grădina Hesperidelor. He visited and studied in France during 1912 and 1914, then returned to Romania for employment as a substitute teacher of French in Iași, Brăila, Tecuci, and Bârlad. His second volume, the poem Orașele dezamăgite ("Jaded Cities"), came out in Iași in 1914.

=== 1920s ===
After the outbreak of World War I, and during the two years of Romanian neutrality, Versuri și Proză affiliated with the pro-Entente and Francophile movement, finally obtaining its acceptance by the cultural mainstream. Just after the war's end, in 1919, Rașcu received a full teaching position at Unirea High School in Focșani. While there, he founded and led a student literary society, named in honor of Grigore Alexandrescu, and put out its yearbook, noted for its reviews of 19th-century Romantic poetry and its encouragement of intellectual debates between students. Gândirea magazine condoned his efforts in this respect, while also noting that Rașcu and his students made a habit of trekking through "the less visited parts" of Vrancea County, following in the footsteps of mountaineer Bucura Dumbravă. According to linguist Iorgu Iordan, his was "a tireless and completely selfless work", all the more admirable considering that Focșani "was not quite the lover of art and literature". In addition to such contributions, Rașcu himself published his own textbook and chrestomathy of Romanian literature.

According to Virgil Huzum, a poet and Unirea graduate, the school could remember Rașcu "with justified pride." Nevertheless, Rașcu was not happy teaching in Focșani: as Iordan writes, his sternness was not well received by his students, and, when his grading system was challenged by his superiors, he resigned from his position altogether. Eventually, he relocated to Bucharest, where, from 1923 to 1933, he taught at Șincai Lyceum, and presided over its students' Society for the Study of Romanian Literature.

Returning to France for a 1924 visit, Rașcu remained there on an extended study trip, from 1925 to 1929, and was a resident scholar of Nicolae Iorga's Romanian School in Fontenay-aux-Roses. He attended the College of Sorbonne, specializing in comparative literature and attending the courses of Fernand Baldensperger and Paul Hazard. His main interest was Mihai Eminescu, Romania's national poet, analyzed in comparison with French writers of his day. He inventoried such literary sources at the National Library, which he frequented on a regular basis. While Rașcu was still abroad, fellow writer Al. Lascarov-Moldovanu put out another selection of his poetry, the 1927 Neliniști ("Unrests").

Rașcu's time in France evidenced his commitment to Catholicism. For 9 days in August 1929, he secluded himself at the original Trappist monastery, the Abbey of La Trappe, in what was an effort to escape from the encroachment of modernity. In France, Rașcu experienced not just Catholic fervor, but, according to his own account, a personal miracle: he claimed that a statue of Saint Thérèse of Lisieux smiled upon him in Ville-d'Avray.

=== Îndreptar ===
Returning to public life in 1930, Rașcu launched the magazine Îndreptar ("Rectifier") with assistance from his old Symbolist friends Cruceanu and Sperantia, and with additional help from Huzum and Mia Frollo. It was also there that he published "splinters" from an incomplete Christian novel, as well as articles of literary history—sometimes as I.M.R., but usually as Evandru. The review was hotly criticized by Gândirea ideologist Nichifor Crainic, who wrote off its attempts to revive Symbolism. Its "exaggerated Francophilia", Crainic claimed, clashed with the day's agenda, which involved "searching for our [Romanian] selves at the deepest level". Although an Orthodox theologian, Crainic still admired Rașcu's faith and his "fine spiritual evolution".

At Îndreptar and elsewhere, Rașcu published his finds on Eminescu, hypothesizing about the latter's sources of inspiration in modern French literature (particularly Lamartine and Gautier). These studies earned him accolades from the specialty press, but were also attacked by philologist Vladimir Streinu. According to Streinu, Rașcu's "anthill" of references only managed to show "coincidences" between Eminescu's poetry and the work of various French authors.

Rașcu refocused on his teaching career, and, in 1933, published the pamphlet Cum se dezorganizează învățământul ("How They Are Breaking Education Apart"). In 1934, his account of a pilgrimage to the shrine of Saint Thérèse in Lisieux was published in Bucharest, followed in 1935 by a selection of prose poems, called Vibrări ("Vibrations"). Also that year, he issued a monograph about Eminescu's view of Catholicism (Eminescu și catolicismul). It explores the many variants of Eminescu's "Prayer to the Virgin", linking them to the Litany of the Blessed Virgin Mary and highlighting Eminescu's primordial debt to Western canon. The book also shows Rașcu being troubled by Eminescu's Orthodox background, and what it meant for his theoretical salvation. When switching focus to on politics, Rașcu outlines the tenets of Eminescu's distaste for the enforced secularism of the French Third Republic; however, he also renders (and deplores) the poet's adversity toward the establishment of a Bucharest Catholic See.

=== Later life ===
In 1936, the Cluj review Gând Românesc put out as a volume Rașcu's literary study, comparing the work of Eminescu and Vasile Alecsandri (as Eminescu și Alecsandri). The essay Convingeri literare ("Literary Convictions") came out in 1937. Rașcu had by then moved to a teaching position at Mihai Viteazul National College, and, in 1938, put out a second Romanian literary textbook, Alte opere din literatura română. The work pitted Rașcu against his former employer Iorga, whose hypotheses and impressions on the sources of Romantic literature it would not credit. In his review of the book, Iorga complained that Rașcu had displayed a "harsh professorial" attitude toward his own research.

Rașcu returned to poetry in 1939, with Renunțările luminoase ("Luminous Renunciations"). In 1943, at the height of World War II, Editura Cugetarea put out his Setea liniștei eterne ("Thirsting for Eternal Serenity"), which detailed his time at the La Trappe.

Rașcu survived the postwar imposition of a communist regime, but faded into obscurity. Leonte Răutu, the communist official in charge of cultural affairs, wrote him off in 1949 as "a very inconsequential figure" in Romanian literature. He returned to the spotlight in the late 1960s, when he helped researcher Mihail Straje document the pseudonymous work of himself and other Symbolists (such as Hefter-Hidalgo, Păstorel Teodoreanu, and Barbu Solacolu). At the time, a critical review of Rașcu's work was published by Constantin Ciopraga in the magazine Cronica.

His own Amintiri și medalioane literare ("Literary Memoirs and Medallions"), comprising short biographies of his friends, was published in 1967, the same year as his definitive Poeme ("Poems"). He was also in correspondence with publisher Teodor Vârgolici, who published, at Editura Minerva, Rașcu's crowning critical study, the 1969 Eminescu și cultura franceză ("Eminescu and French Culture"). He died in Bucharest in late 1971.

== Literary work ==
As Călinescu suggests, I. M. Rașcu was a "constant" Symbolist, oriented toward a trademark "provincial", "Sunday" poetry, which mirrored his "melancholy seclusion" and "sacred bucolic joys". Cultural historian and critic Eugen Lovinescu summarizes Rașcu's poetry as "asthenia", "projecting life beyond reality, into the realm of dreams, [...] the life of a bloodless ghost". Critic Tudor Vianu reads Rașcu as mainly a Moldavian Symbolist, in line with Bacovia, Ștefan Petică, and Demostene Botez. In comparison with the "rhetorical temperaments" of the Wallachian Symbolist school, such authors proved to be "natures of the interior"; against Wallachian "cosmopolitanism", they held up an attachment to "the tiny Moldavian târg."

However, as Lovinescu writes, such traits did not exempt Rașcu from exoticism and cosmopolitanism: along with Eugeniu Sperantia and Alexandru Gherghel, he "made skillful use" of the modernizing and "decorative" Romanian lexis favored by Densusianu at Vieața Nouă. According to Cernat, Rașcu's early poems mainly feature "Symbolist, Secessionist and Art Nouveau clichés"; in his Orașele dezamăgite, he merely adapted the scenery of Georges Rodenbach's Bruges-la-Morte to a Moldavian setting. His own poetic tropes were nostalgic, evoking the medieval atmosphere of castles, domes, crypts, galleys, but also parks and ponds. The effect of such poetry was, according to Lovinescu, "academic" and "discoursive", often "prolix", and only "externally Symbolist".

Rașcu's religious itineraries were unusual in the Romanian context, and not just for illustrating the Catholic option—a minority one in Romania. At the time of its publishing, Rașcu's homage to Saint Thérèse was hailed in the Catholic press as one of the "few original works of religious inspiration" (as opposed to sheer translations), and also the work of "a talented poet". Adrian Marino notes that, as time passed, Rașcu seemed "more determined" to settle into an absolute seclusion from the secular world. His Catholic writing evidenced "such conviction", "that any suspicion becomes an undeserved insult"—Rașcu seemed to Marino a modern-day "Crusader". Also according to Marino, Setea liniștei eterne was unwittingly amusing, "candid" and "prudish", particularly with its "misogynistic" commentary on the attire of female believers; however, Rașcu's "dreamy and monkish temperament cannot fail to impress us."
