= Simbolul =

Romanian avant-garde literary and art magazine

- Cover of Simbolul's first issue, with artwork by Marcel Janco
- Editor: Tristan Tzara
- Categories: art magazine; literary magazine; satirical magazine
- First issue: October 25, 1912
- Final issue: December 1912
- Country: Romania
- Language: Romanian

Simbolul (Romanian for "The Symbol", pronounced [simˈbolul]) was a Romanian avant-garde literary and art magazine, published in Bucharest between October and December 1912. Co-founded by writers Tristan Tzara and Ion Vinea, together with visual artist Marcel Janco, while they were all high school students, the journal was a late representative of international Symbolism and the Romanian Symbolist movement. Other figures associated with the magazine were Adrian Maniu, Emil Isac and Claudia Millian, the wife of poet and Tzara's mentor Ion Minulescu. Simbolul also featured illustrations by, among others, Janco and his teacher Iosif Iser.

Despite going through just four issues, Simbolul helped the transition toward avant-garde currents in Romanian literature and art, by publishing anti-establishment satirical pieces, and by popularizing modernist trends such as Fauvism and Cubism. Its successors on the local literary scene were Vinea's moderate magazines Chemarea and Contimporanul, while Tzara and Janco evolved to a more radical stance, taking part in founding the avant-garde trend known as Dada.

== History ==
=== Context ===
Around 1907, soon after the violent quelling of the peasants' revolt, left-wing authors such as Tudor Arghezi, Gala Galaction, Vasile Demetrius and N. D. Cocea began issuing a series of magazines which, in addition to following a radical political line, accommodated a modernist style. This approach contrasted with the more traditional approach favored by the Poporanist group and its Viața Românească journal. Another important factor in the evolution from Symbolism to radical modernism between 1895 and 1920 was the literary and artistic circle formed around controversial politician and author Alexandru Bogdan-Pitești, which grouped together many of Simbolul 's contributors. Starting in 1910, artistic innovation had also manifested itself in art, with the activities of Tinerimea Artistică society and the art chronicles authored by Bogdan-Pitești, Arghezi and Theodor Cornel. Janco, who was at the time Iser's pupil, exhibited his first drawings at the Tinerimea Artistică Youth Salon in April 1912.

The journal built on the legacy of other short-lived literary publications, in particular Revista Celor L'alți and Insula, both of which had been founded by poet Ion Minulescu. A follower of French Symbolist critic Rémy de Gourmont, Minulescu had previously launched radical appeals to innovation, which some critics consider the first expressions of Romanian avant-gardism, and which established connections not just with Symbolism, but also with the Futurism of Italian writer Filippo Tommaso Marinetti. However, literary critic Paul Cernat notes, Ion Minulescu "did not have the virtues of an ideologue and a theorist." Thus, Simbolul was called by Cernat "a turning plate between the Symbolism of Insula contributors and pre-avant-gardist Post-symbolism."

=== Contributors ===
The three founders of the magazine, which published its six issues after October 25, 1912, were all in their teenage years. Tzara, known then under his birth name Samuel (Samy) Rosenstock and his early pseudonym S. Samyro, was sixteen and probably enrolled at the Sfântul Gheorghe High School. The magazine never published an editorial cassette, but a note in issue 3 specified that "all editing aspects are in the care of Mr. S. Samyro". Tzara and Janco were probably the publication's main financial backers.

Samyro debuted as a poet in Simbolul, contributing Symbolist pieces which, according to Paul Cernat, showed the influence of Belgian writer Maurice Maeterlinck, as well as that of Minulescu. Swedish literary historian Tom Sandqvist notes: "In his own poems in Simbolul, Samuel Rosenstock [...] had quite a distance still to walk before he turned his back on symbolism". In all, Tzara published four lyrical pieces, one in each issue, pieces which Cernat deemed "naively musical", and which other critics found so uncharacteristic that they believed them to be pastiche. The pieces are: Pe râul vieții ("On the River of Life", included in the inaugural issue), Cântec ("Song"), Poveste ("Story") and Dans de fée ("Fairy Dance").

Ion Eugen Iovanaki, who later adopted the name Ion Vinea, was a seventeen-year-old from Giurgiu, who studied at the Saint Sava National College, and who first met Adrian Maniu when the latter was employed as his tutor. According to Cernat, Iovanaki's poems show the influence of Symbolism and its precursor, Parnassianism, being inspired by or adapted from the work of French poets Albert Samain and Charles Baudelaire. They include the first issue's Cetate moartă ("Dead Citadel", with the subtitle "After Albert Samain") and Sonet ("Sonnet"), as well as the English-titled Lewdness, dedicated to an unnamed prostitute, and Mare ("Sea"). The latter was the first in a series dedicated to seascapes and marine art, and referenced Iser's early paintings.

Maniu and Emil Isac took charge of the political and satirical side of Simbolul. Maniu also contributed a series of humorous prose poems, which was later published in his volume Figurile de ceară ("The Wax Figures"); they include the Cântec pentru întuneric ("Song for When It's Dark"), which is a parody of Symbolist leader Alexandru Macedonski's Noapte de mai ("May Night", part of the Nights cycle), replacing its Parnassian metaphors with a seemingly nonsensical imagery, and Minciune trăite ("Experienced Lies"), which literary critic Leon Baconsky praises for its "complete liberty of [word] association and metaphoric combinations". Sandqvist writes that, although influenced by Symbolism, Maniu was by then experimenting with "absurdism", something he believes is characteristic for both Figurile de ceară and the Simbolul story Mirela (in which the male protagonist, the failed writer Brutus, blames all women for his lack of success and is driven to suicide inside a damp room kept warm by his trousers). Vinea's Saint Sava colleague Poldi Chapier, a future journalist, lawyer and promoter of Marcel Janco's art, regularly contributed poetry, considered "rather colorless" by Cernat. Other poets whose work was regularly published by Simbolul included Alfred Hefter-Hidalgo and the brothers Theodor and Alfred Solacolu. The latter were noted for their erotic pieces with subjects such as the physical contact between virgins.

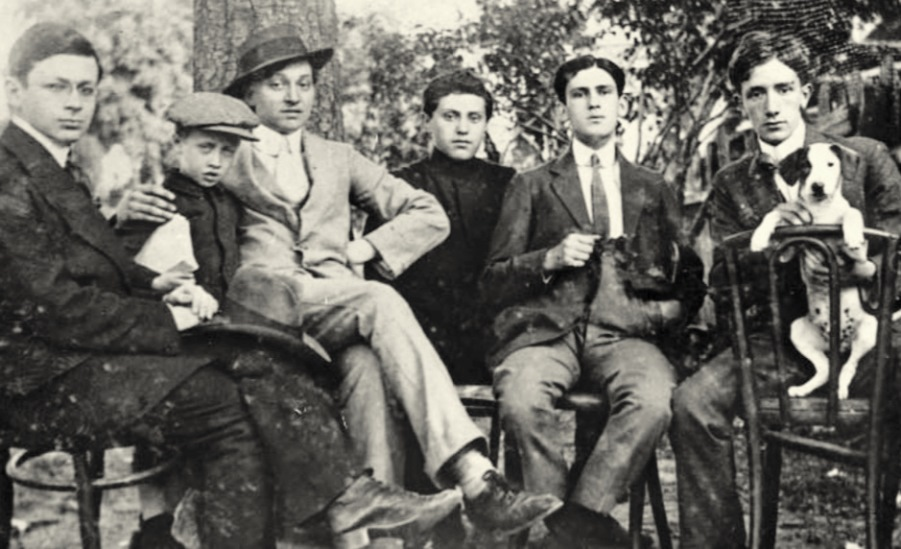
Tristan Tzara, Marcel Janco, Jules Janco, Poldi Chapier, and Ion Vinea, photographed during their Simbolul period

Alongside the regular or frequent contributors, Simbolul attracted established Symbolist writers or other young authors, whose work it only occasionally featured. According to American art historian S. A. Mansbach, the "enthusiasm" displayed by Simbolul's young editors "must have been enormously persuasive", since "their magazine included contributions by some of Romania's most established symbolist poets, writers, and artists." It was here that Macedonski published Ură ("Hatred"), a piece adapted from the Renaissance author Cecco Angioleri. Minulescu, whose work was by then concentrated on romanza-like poems, contributed the first printed version of his Romanța unui rege asiatic ("An Asian King's Romanza"), and his wife Claudia Millian published two poems—Ție, obsesia mea ("To You, My Obsession") and Filozofie banală ("Banal Philosophy"). The latter was a parable about Jesus Christ, showing the Biblical Magi visiting "the greatest symbolist poet of humankind". The other authors who sent poems to be published by Simbolul were N. Davidescu, I. M. Rașcu, Eugeniu Ștefănescu-Est, Constantin T. Stoika, Șerban Bascovici, Alexandru Vițianu, George Stratulat, and Al. T. Stamatiad. An additional contributor was Alexandru Coșbuc, the son of poet George Coșbuc, who published a poetic prose fragment in Simbolul 's first issue; this was one of the few texts published by the young author, who died three years later in a car accident. In his old age, Vinea also recounted that his colleague Jacques G. Costin, who became known as a Surrealist author, was also supposed to publish in Simbolul, but the magazine ceased print before he could submit his works.

Simbolul was illustrated by several graphic artists. In addition to regularly submitted drawings by Janco, noted for their accomplished stylization, it featured sketches by Iser, Maniu and Millian. His cover for the first issue is seen by Sandqvist as especially representative for the magazine's decorative style. Showing a "somewhat awkwardly drawn" female figure, the piece may be, in Sandqvist's interpretation, the artist's attempt to replicate Art Nouveau. The researcher also notes that Janco's later illustrations for Simbolul discarded such influences, adopting the style of Paul Cézanne and influence of Cubism.

=== Polemics and advocacies ===
Starting with it first reviews in the Romanian press, Simbolul became in cultural polemics with other cultural venues. The magazine's first issue was welcomed by the mainstream cultural journal Noua Revistă Română, which was edited by philosopher Constantin Rădulescu-Motru—the publication nonetheless commented that Simbolul was "not at all Symbolist". Its modernism was viewed with suspicion by the Poporanist Viața Românească, which published two satirical articles directly aimed at Simbolul. The Poporanists' press review alleged that Simbolul was a sign of "alienation".

Simbolul stood out for mocking the pastoral themes of dominant traditionalist or neoromantic literature, either affiliates of the Poporanist faction or those inspired by the defunct magazine Sămănătorul. Throughout its short existence, the magazine popularized modernist trends and satirized the traditionalist and mainstream authors. Among the other targets of Simbolul's criticism was epigramist Cincinat Pavelescu, an adversary of new trends who was mockingly defined as "if not a Symbolist, then at least a Futurist à outrance [French for 'to the uttermost']". In its third issue, an unsigned article recommended readers to purchase the book on Cubism authored by French painters Jean Metzinger and Albert Gleizes, whom the author described as "two of the most outstanding representatives of the new current."

In large part, Emil Isac's articles were answers to criticism from the nationalist press. Born in Austro–Hungarian-ruled Transylvania, Isac had immigrated into the Romanian Kingdom and begun his career as a dramatist with the controversial play Maica cea tânără ("The Young Nun"). Accused of blasphemy, the author was also suspected of being Jewish by the antisemitic section of the public opinion, who implied that his name sounded Hebrew. In his Protopopii familiei mele ("My Family's Protopopes"), a piece of avant-garde writing, Isac made reference to this rumor and dismissed it, while ridiculing the entire ethnic nationalist camp. According to Sandqvist, Protopopii familiei mele was specifically aimed at historian, Democratic Nationalist Party leader, and former Sămănătorul editor Nicolae Iorga. In his 1934 work of literary history, Iorga remembered Simbolul as a Macedonski byproduct, and briefly noted Janco's art, as "abundant illustration of ugly naked women."

== Legacy ==
The collaboration between Tzara, Vinea and Maniu continued for a while after Simbolul was no longer in print. Their style evolved from late Symbolism to adopt a more experimental approach. Sandqvist notes: "With its unconventional prose and its new, subversive poetic images and metaphors, the journal was inspired by the antibourgeois and in many respects bohemian symbolism, while at the same time it contained absurd elements almost totally unfamiliar to the symbolist approach. The lack of national motifs was also remarkable within the framework of a culture in which almost every expression of whatever kind was connected in one way or another to the Romanian nation or to the Romanian people and its historical mission."

Mainly influenced by Fauvism and Imagism, Maniu passed through a stage in World War I when, like Alexandru Bogdan-Pitești, he supported the Central Powers during their occupation of southern Romania. Progressively after the war ended, Maniu broke with radical modernism, eventually rallying with the traditionalist circle formed around Gândirea magazine. Ion Vinea went on to publish articles in N. D. Cocea's papers Facla and Rampa, building a reputation for his modernist literary criticism. In 1915, with Cocea's assistance and the participation of Tristan Tzara and Poldi Chapier, he set up another important modernist magazine, the more radical Chemarea. He and Tzara were vacationing together in Gârceni and the Black Sea coast, writing poems which showed similarities in style, but also differences in radicalism—with Tzara moving closer to the avant-garde than Vinea was. In Tzara's case, Cernat argues, this evolution implied "playful detachment", first evidenced in his known piece Verișoară, fată de pension ("Little Cousin, Boarding School Girl").

In 1915, Tzara and Marcel Janco, together with Janco's brothers Georges and Jules, settled in neutral Switzerland. There, together with Hugo Ball and other Western Europeans, they staged experimental shows at the Cabaret Voltaire, and later took part in founding the anti-establishment, anti-art and radical avant-garde current known as Dada, of which Tzara became an international promoter. In 1922, Vinea became the co-founder of Contimporanul, one of the most influential modernist journals of the interwar period. He was joined in this effort by Marcel Janco, who had parted with Dada and adopted a style inspired by Constructivism, remaining hostile to his former collaborator Tzara. Most of the Simbolul writers became regular or occasional contributors to Vinea's new magazine.

The Simbolul contributors had contrasting attitudes about their 1912 debut. During the 1930s, Janco recalled: "We were the founders of the Simbolul review, the pioneers of a revolutionary era in Romanian art." He also noted that the magazine had struggled to liberate the literary scene from conventions, by means of "unveilings, philosophy and passion". Contrarily, the aging Tristan Tzara felt insecure about the quality of his literary contributions to his poems, and, in a letter to his Romanian editor and Surrealist writer Sașa Pană, asked for them not to be republished as a volume.
