= Eugeniu Ștefănescu-Est =

Romanian poet, prose writer and visual artist

Eugeniu Ștefănescu-Est (also known as Eugen Ștefănescu-Est or Eugeniu Est, born Eugeniu Gh. Ștefănescu; March 14 [O.S. March 2] 1881 – March 12, 1980) was a Romanian poet, prose writer and visual artist, professionally active as a lawyer. He belonged to the local Symbolist movement from ca. 1900, when he also became an associate and disciple of Ion Minulescu. Before Worled War I, while he took up jobs as a magistrate, his synaesthesic and extrovert lyrical pieces earned attention, while his cartoons were taken up in magazines such as L'Assiette au Beurre and Furnica. He abandoned the verse genre by the 1920s, earning attention as the author of fairy tales, and then also trying his hand as a novelist. Eventually losing his eyesight, Ștefănescu-Est spent the last thirty years of his life in anonymity, looked after by his daughter.

== Biography ==
Born in Craiova to composer George Stephănescu and his wife Eufrosina (née Negoescu), he attended high school in Ploiești and at Bucharest's Poenaru and Saint Sava high schools. He made his poetry debut with Toamna ("Autumn") in Foaia pentru toți, in 1897. His work was published by Literatorul, the Symbolist review, but also saw print in the traditionalist Sămănătorul. Completing his secondary education with private tutors, Ștefănescu was reportedly boarding-school colleagues with Minulescu, his future associate and inspiration. He took his baccalaureate, then studied law at Bucharest and Paris universities. Around 1903, in France, he debuted as a cartoonist, his work taken up in L'Assiette au Beurre, L'Indiscret, and La Chronique Amusante. He obtained a law degree in 1904, finding his first employment as a clerk at the House of Arts, and, from April 1906, was an assistant judge at Turnu Măgurele.

From 1906, as "Est", he began contributing caricatures and cartoons to George Ranetti's Furnica. His identity was ultimately revealed to the public in 1924. His poetic work was featured in Minulescu's Symbolist magazines: Revista Celor L'alți (on its very last issue, that of April 1908) and Insula, where he was one of the main contributors. It also appeared in Seara, the Symbolist-friendly newspaper, and in Tristan Tzara's Simbolul. For a while, he attended the salon hosted by Alexandru Bogdan-Pitești, the controversial arts patron. In parallel, from 1908, Ștefănescu was judge in training at Ciolăneștii din Deal, Teleorman County, and on the Ștorobăneasa–Bârca circuit; he was a lawyer in Prahova County from 1910. After a brief marriage to an unknown woman from Ciolăneștii din Deal, he wed a Virginia Malcoci Petrescu in September 1911. His first book also appeared that year, as Poeme ("Poems").

In interwar Greater Romania, Ștefănescu resumed his practice, transferring to the Ilfov County bar association in April 1923. He became a widower that year, after which he lived in informal relationships with various women; his two children from his late wife, Margareta and Miron, were adopted by a maternal aunt who lived in Bucharest. With his work included in 1920s anthologies by Perpessicius and Ion Pillat, his second book of verse, the 1925 Imperii efemere ("Ephemeral Empires"); another book, Armonii lascive ("Lascivious Harmonies"), was announced but never appeared. He became a bailiff at the courthouses in Buzău (May 1931), Brașov (November 1933) and Alba Iulia (April 1934), by then focusing on writing prose. His modern fairy tales, inspired by Romanian folklore, appeared in 1929 as Păunașul Codrilor ("Little Peacock of the Forest"). He resigned from the magistracy in September 1934, but continued to write in the folkloric genre, with collections that had Romanian, Arab or Indian themes: Povestea lui Buceag Împărat ("The Tale of Emperor Steppe", 1937), Povestea lui Mitu Sucitu ("The Tale of Contorted Mitu", 1939), Abdalah și frumoasa Azad ("Abdalah and Fair Azad", 1939). The series was completed with Zastra fachirul ("Zahra the Fakir", 1939).

His novels, published during World War II, were Spre o nouă viață ("Toward a New Life", 1941), Școala dragostei ("The school of Love", 1943), and Femei moderne ("Modern Women", 1944). By then his daughter Margareta, or Marga, was also earning notoriety as a visual artist: after working for Straja Țării, she illustrated books by Mihail Drumeș and the literary newspaper Ziarul Copiilor (which she also edited in 1947). In 1949, under the communist regime, Ștefănescu-Est unsuccessfully attempted to publish the novella Țara mea frumoasă ("My beautiful Land") and the fairy tale Făt-Frumos din agrișe ("Făt-Frumos of the Gooseberries"). Completely forgotten by 1950, he had also lost his eyesight.

The family was repressed under the new laws: Marga's husband, who had served in the Honor Guard at the Royal Palace, was imprisoned. Giving up on publishing, Marga moved to Galați, where she taught technical drawing at the Faculty of Land Development. She took her father with her and provided for him. In 1968, an anthology listed the poet as deceased, but Ștefănescu gave an interview in 1977 at his Galați home—according to critic Alexandru Piru, this was a "Ionescian" situation. He died in Galați just before turning 99, making him "the dean of Romanian poetry, age-wise". Rediscovered and republished after the Romanian Revolution of 1989, Marga Ștefănescu, remarried Ciurdăreanu, turned 100 in March 2013.

== Literary work ==
In 1927, the modernist reviewer Eugen Lovinescu suggested that Ștefănescu-Est was primarily a disciple of Ion Minulescu, copying Minulescu's "technique and verbalization". The Symbolist poet-critic N. Davidescu, and later also the scholar Tudor Vianu, described Ștefănescu-Est as belonging to a "Wallachian", rhetorical and "extrovert", school of Romanian Symbolism; by contrast, the Moldavians, from Ștefan Petică to Benjamin Fondane, were pensive, melancholy, and "introvert".

Rating his poems in Simbolul, researcher Paul Cernat finds that they fit in with generically "Symbolist, Secession and Art Nouveau cliches". However, according to the literary critic and historian George Călinescu, "Est" struck a peculiar note in the Symbolist movement, his poetry being "thematically Symbolist", but lacking "spleen". Heavily inspired by the early Symbolism of Alexandru Macedonski, synaesthesic, it held "enchanting explosion[s] of [...] of treasures", "exotic and rare vegetation", "lands of camellias, blue gardens and green lakes", "tea glasses [that] contain magic". Davidescu also claims that Ștefănescu-Est had introduced to the poetic language a "hitherto unknown [...] palette" of synaesthesic terms and feelings. A "pastel" of his described the harmonies of sunset:

Culori topite'n nebuloză
Acorduri triste de pastel!
Fior de roz...
Delir de verde...
Secret de galben...
Plâns de gri...
Fluide roșii și albastre...
Rugină...
Sânge...
Și lumină fosforescentă
Văd curgând.

Translation:

Colors blending into nebulous,
These very sad notes of pastel!
Pink thrills of rose...
A green of frenzy...
Secrets of yellow...
Grayish sob...
Fluids that come out red and blue...
Rusty sun...
And blood...
With a phosphoric light, I see them:
Dripping down.

The fairy tales, Călinescu notes, have a "great sense of the fantastic and polychrome, without cultivated slip-ups, [and] very graceful." He reserves praise for stories such as Ineluș-învârteluș, where the eponymous hero breaks spell and kisses a fairy, after which he is pursued "over hills and fields" by vine props that have come alive.
