= Perpessicius =

Romanian literary historian and writer (1891–1971)

Dumitru S. Panaitescu
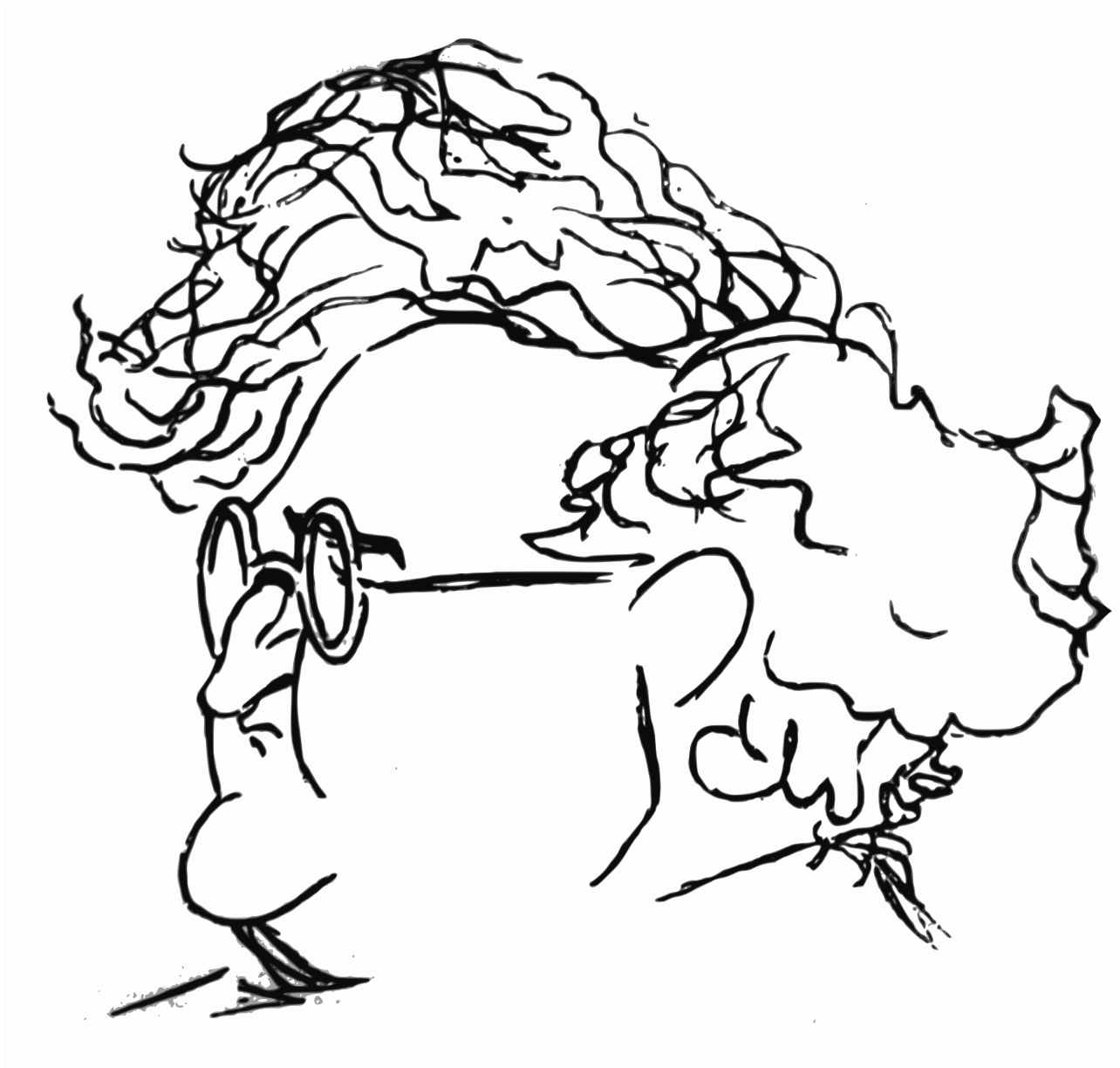
- Caricature of Perpessicius, by Victor Ion Popa
- Born: October 22, 1891; Brăila, Romania
- Died: March 29, 1971 (aged 79); Bucharest
- Occupations: literary critic, literary historian, poet, journalist, novelist, translator, editor, publisher, art critic, folklorist, radio broadcaster, museologist, librarian, civil servant, activist
- Writing career
- Pen name: Perpessicius, D. Pandara
- Period: 1913–1971
- Genres: lyric poetry, elegy, biography, essay, satire
- Movements: Symbolism, Modernism, Neoclassicism, Viața Românească

Perpessicius (Romanian: [perpeˈsit͡ʃjus]; pen name of Dumitru S. Panaitescu, also known as Panait Șt. Dumitru, D. P. Perpessicius and Panaitescu-Perpessicius; October 22, 1891 – March 29, 1971) was a Romanian literary historian and critic, poet, essayist and fiction writer. One of the prominent literary chroniclers of the Romanian interwar period, he stood apart in his generation for having thrown his support behind the modernist and avant-garde currents of Romanian literature. As a theorist, Perpessicius merged the tenets of Symbolism with the pragmatic conservative principles of the 19th century Junimea society, but was much-criticized over perceptions that, in the name of aesthetic relativism, he tolerated literary failure. Also known as an anthologist, biographer, museologist, folklorist and book publisher, he was, together with George Călinescu, one of his generation's best-known researchers to have focused on the work of Junimist author and since-acknowledged national poet Mihai Eminescu. Much of Perpessicius' career was dedicated to collecting, structuring and interpreting Eminescu's texts, resulting in an authoritative edition of Eminescu's writings, the 17-volume Opere ("Works").

A veteran of World War I, where he lost use of his right arm, Perpessicius debuted in poetry while recovering in hospital, publishing the critically acclaimed volume Scut și targă ("Shield and Stretcher"). His subsequent "intimist" and Neoclassical tendencies made him part of a distinct current within the local branch of Symbolism. Like other mainstream modernists of his day, Perpessicius also espoused anti-fascism and criticized nationalism in general, attitudes which led him into conflict with the 1930s far right. From 1938 to 1940, he controversially offered a degree of support to the fascist-inspired National Renaissance Front and was promoted by its leader, King Carol II. Sympathetic to the left-wing trend after World War II, he was drawn into cooperation with the Romanian Communist Party. Although subsequently endorsed and acclaimed by the communist regime, he was reluctant to condone its policies and dedicated his final years almost exclusively to literature. A member of the Romanian Academy and founding director of the Museum of Romanian Literature, he was co-editor of Viața Românească magazine, and, in 1957, head of the academy's library.

== Name ==
Known initially as Panait S. Dumitru or Panaiot Șt. Dumitru (with an inverted name order and the middle initial standing for his patronymic), the author was given the name Dumitru S. Panaitescu (also Dimitire Panaiot, Panaitescu Șt. Dumitru), while in primary school. To his friends, he was known as Mitică or Mitiș, the pet forms of Dumitru.

Perpessicius' pseudonym, dating from ca. 1913-1918 is Latin for "he who suffers" or "he who was tested". Some commentators believe that the verb had special significance for Perpessicius, as either an ironic coincidence or a direct consequence of losing his writing arm. Others argue that it was merely imposed on him by his writer friends Tudor Arghezi and Gala Galaction.

== Biography ==
=== Early life and World War I ===
Born in the Danube port city of Brăila, in the Bărăgan Plain areas, Perpessicius was the son of middle-class parents Ștefan Panaiot (or Panaitescu) and Ecaterina (née Daraban), who owned a house on Cetății Street. Between 1898 and 1902, he attended the Nr. 4 Primary School, completing his gymnasium-level and secondary education at the Nicolae Bălcescu School (1902–1910).

The future Perpessicius rallied with Symbolism while still an adolescent, and, at his Baccalaureate examination of 1910, gave a spoken presentation of innovative poet Ion Minulescu. He subsequently left for Bucharest, where he attended the city university's Faculty of Letters, specializing in Romance studies. He notably attended lectures on modern Romance-language literature given by Ovid Densusianu, patron of the Symbolist school, which he himself deemed a formative experience. Also during his university years, he first came into contact with the remaining manuscripts of Mihai Eminescu, on which his later exegesis would rely. He made his literary debut with poems sent to the Versuri și Proză magazine, edited in Iași by Densusianu's admirers I. M. Rașcu and Alfred Hefter-Hidalgo. One of them, titled Reminiscență ("Reminiscence"), was signed with the pen name D. Pandara. At around that time, the young author met and befriended Parnassian poet Artur Enășescu, being, together with fellow critic Tudor Vianu, a witness to Enășescu's life before it was changed by mental disorder and material ruin.

Perpessicius graduated in 1914, the same year when he married Alice Paleologu. In autumn 1915, at around the same time when Alice gave birth to a boy, he was appointed a clerk at the Romanian Academy Library, assigned to work on its new catalog. That year, other early selections of his writings saw print in Cronica, a Symbolist and left-wing journal co-edited by Arghezi and Galaction. Perpessicus may have also shared Cronica's Germanophile agenda, which, at the time, implied criticism of the Entente Powers. He was by then working on a novel, titled Veninul ("The Venom"). A fragment of this work saw print in Arena, a short-lived magazine edited by poets Ion Vinea and Demostene Botez in collaboration with Hefter-Hidalgo and N. Porsenna.

Perpessicius joined the Romanian Army in 1916, as Romania rallied with the Entente against the Central Powers (see Romania during World War I). He was sent to Northern Dobruja in the wake of the Turtucaia defeat, when southern Romania was being invaded by Bulgarian and Imperial German forces. On October 6, 1916, during the skirmish of Muratan, his right elbow was hit by an enemy bullet, being partially amputated by surgeons in order to prevent a loss of the entire limb. His disabled arm was fastened with a black-colored sling, and Perpessicius taught himself to write left-handed (a change which reportedly made his handwriting instantly recognizable by his peers).

=== 1920s ===
By late 1918, as Romania signed an armistice with the Central Powers, Perpessicius returned to Bucharest. It was there that, together with two of Denusianu's disciples—Dragoș Protopopescu and Scarlat Struțeanu—he established the magazine Letopiseți, which did not survive into the next year. After the November 1918 Armistice, which saw the end of the war to the Entente's benefit, and after the Austro-Hungarian-ruled region of Transylvania was united with Romania, Perpessicius was assigned to a teaching position in the newly gained city of Arad, at the Moise Nicoară High School (1919) and afterward at the Târgu Mureș Military High School. From autumn 1920 to summer 1921, he returned to Brăila, employed by the Normal School as a teacher of Romanian and French. Citing letters the young teacher had sent to his friends, Vianu reports that he missed working in the archives.

Late in 1921, Perpessicius made his return to Bucharest, where, until 1929, he held teaching positions at various high schools and business education establishments. In 1922, he began his work in Romanian theater, collaborating with the Iași-based Insula, a troupe founded by writer Benjamin Fondane and actor Armand Pascal. The company favored a characteristic blended of modernist theater and influences from defunct traditionalist currents such as Sămănătorul. Just before it went bankrupt in early 1923, it was planning a "spoken anthology", during which notes compiled on several authors were supposed to be read for the public: Fondane's own comments on Arghezi, together with those of Perpessicius and Ion Călugăru on traditionalist poets—respectively, Alexandru Vlahuță and George Coșbuc.

Also in 1923, he debuted as a literary chronicler and a regular on Felix Aderca's magazine Spre Ziuă. By 1924, he had articles published in leading Romanian magazines: Ideea Europeană, Mișcarea Literară, Cuget Românesc and Camil Petrescu's Săptămâna Muncii Intelectuale și Artistice. His debut volume of essays, Repertoriu critic ("Critical Repertoire"), was commissioned by the Romanian Orthodox Arad Diocese, saw print in 1925. Perpessicius was by then also noted as an advocate of public causes: his articles reacted against the decision to publicly auction the large art collection of Alexandru Bogdan-Pitești, a controversial politician and former convict who had bequeathed it to the state.

Having established contacts with the emerging avant-garde during the war years, Perpessicius notably signaled the 1923 debut of its representative, poet Ilarie Voronca. He was, with poet Ion Pillat, editor of Antologia poeților de azi ("The Anthology of Present-Day Poets", 2 vols., 1925 and 1928), often considered a seminal text for the popularization of innovative literature, and featuring ink drawings by Marcel Janco, a co-founder of Dadaism. His critically acclaimed collection of war poems, Scut și targă, was published in 1926. In 1927, the same year as Pillat and Artur Enășescu, he received the Award for Poetry granted by the Romanian Writers' Society. During those years, Perpessicius fell in love with Viorica "Yvoria" Secoșanu, a woman scholar who became his mistress. When she became aware that the critic was happily married, she committed self-immolation in Bellu cemetery, and died in hospital a short while after. The detail was omitted from Perpessicus' official biographies, and resurfaced only in 2009.

Perpessicius was one of the moderate figures to sign contributions for the cosmopolitan avant-garde magazine Contimporanul, published by his friends Vinea and Janco, part of a small group which also included, at the time, Minulescu, Pillat, Camil Baltazar, Claudia Millian, Alexandru Al. Philippide, Ion Sân-Giorgiu and some others. These texts included some of his "intimist" poems and translations from French poet Francis Jammes. Contimporanul also published his earlier notes on Vlahuță, recovered from the Insula manuscripts. In 1927, Perpessicius took over as chronicler for Nae Ionescu's Cuvântul (before it became a tribune for fascist causes), and, in 1929, became a teacher at the Matei Basarab High School in Bucharest (a position he held until 1951). The second volume of Antologia... was received with less enthusiasm, being even called "wasted energy" by Philippide.

=== 1930s ===
During the 1930s, he published his collected essays and chronicles in several volumes as Mențiuni critice ("Critical Mentions"), most of which were issued by the official publishing house Editura Fundațiilor Regale. In 1934, he signed a contract with the national radio station, entitling him to become its on-air literary chronicler, performing the job until 1938. Working under the direction of Adrian Maniu, a modernist writer and radio broadcaster, Perpessicus devoted special shows to recently deceased authors: the Symbolist-modernist Mateiu Caragiale and the former Poporanist doyen Garabet Ibrăileanu.

He focused part of his subsequent research on Mateiu Caragiale, compiling and transcribing his unpublished notes and diaries. He published a definitive edition of Caragiale's collected works in 1936, and, in 1938, returned with an anthology of French literature, comprising texts which, he argued, blended fiction and theoretical viewpoints. Titled De la Chateaubriand la Mallarmé ("From Chateaubriand to Mallarmé"), it carried a dedication to the memory of French critic Albert Thibaudet. After 1933, he also began planning the definitive edition of Eminescu's Opere, a project he discussed first with Editura Națională Ciornei, and later with Editura Fundațiilor Regale director Alexandru Rosetti; the first volume, grouping Eminescu's anthmously published poems, saw print with Rosetti's institution in 1939, being received with much critical acclaim. He published a second volume of his poetry, Itinerar sentimental ("Sentimental Itinerary", 1932).

By the late 1920s, as nationalism became a radical force on the Romanian political stage, issuing calls for ethnocracy, Perpessicius joined intellectuals who called for moderation. In a 1931 piece for Cuvântul, he reacted against nationalist arguments: "The fashion of good Romanians is making a rather furious comeback. You all know the heresy: one claims that native inhabitants are separated into good and bad, into plagued and pleasant-smelling, less so for their intentions or actions, but rather for the point of view adopted by the esteemed censors of our public and national life. [...] And how much longer do they plan to confront us with this self-sufficient nonsense? Will the mystification never cease? Will common sense never descend among the concrete walls of the office where they forge nationality certificates? No good Romanians but just humans, just humans, gentlemen, and it would suffice." Literary historian Z. Ornea, who likens this "lucid-democratic" text with one issued a year earlier by Viața Românească magazine, notes that both appeals failed to prevent the "totalitarian debauchery" of the subsequent decade, when the Iron Guard emerged as a force.

Perpessicius integrated his condemnation of antisemitism in a radio broadcast of 1934. It reacted against objections that his Antologia... had made a point of adding newly-emancipated Romanian Jews among examples of Romanian literature, reaffirming an earlier rebuttal: "one cannot exclude a poet [...] based only on his nationality paper. The nationality of an artist is of less interest. In the eventuality, it is that of the people whose language he uses in his writing. But what is certain is that the work is the distinguishing sign of art." Alarmed by what he called "a Jewish quota in literature", he gave positive evaluations to newer works by Jewish authors Ury Benador, I. Peltz and his colleague Mihail Sebastian.

During the same period, the modernists in general became targets of a campaign in the radical nationalist, far right and fascist press, including the journals Sfarmă-Piatră, Buna Vestire and Neamul Românesc. These journals, owned respectively by Nichifor Crainic, Mihail Manoilescu and Nicolae Iorga, produced various inflammatory allegations and insults, in particular claims of Judeo-Bolshevik plot and antisemitic slurs. In reaction to this, Perpessicius seconded his colleague Pompiliu Constantinescu in creating Gruparea Criticilor Literari Români (GCLR, the Group of Romanian Literary Critics), a professional association which aimed to protect its members' reputation and reacted in particular to accusations of modernist "pornography". The GCLR counted among its members Șerban Cioculescu and Vladimir Streinu, as well as Sebastian, Ion Biberi and Octav Șuluțiu. The members carried a polemic with Iorga's Cuget Clar magazine, defending Arghezi against accusations of obscenity repeatedly launched by Iorga and opinion journalist N. Georgescu-Cocoș. Perpessicius also tried his hand at mediating the parallel conflict between Streinu and Tudor Vianu, speaking out in writing and on the radio against Streinu's uncharacteristically harsh treatment of Vianu's contributions (1935).

=== King Carol's dictatorship and World War II ===
Perpessicius controversially remained active in the cultural mainstream after 1938, when authoritarian King Carol II banned political activities and created a corporatist and fascist-inspired regime around the National Renaissance Front, thus countering the threat posed by revolutionary fascism. In this context, he began collaborating on Cezar Petrescu's propaganda outlet for the regime, the newspaper România. Also then, he published his collected articles of 1925-1933 as Dictando divers ("Various Writing Exercises"), and received the King Carol II Award for Literature and Art. The critic was a contributor to the state-owned Revista Fundațiilor Regale journal, where he played a part in imposing Carol's personality cult. Thus, as part of a 1940 homage to the ruler, he stated: "Fatherly love and love for the motherland have blended together and submerged into this enchanted river bed, where, together with the Prince's intellectual and spiritual education, was forged the very future of the Motherland." The text, together with similar pieces by cultural figures such as Arghezi, Camil Petrescu, Lucian Blaga, George Călinescu, Constantin Daicoviciu, Constantin Rădulescu-Motru, Mihail Sadoveanu and Ionel Teodoreanu, sparked a controversy in the political underground: one adversary of the monarch, psychologist Nicolae Mărgineanu, referred to the authors in question as "scoundrels". Perpessicius took a stand against the regime's adoption of antisemitism. He thus spoke out against the Romanian Writers' Society decision to eliminate its Jewish members, being, with Nicolae M. Condiescu and Rosetti, one of just three members to voice support for their Jewish colleague Mihail Sebastian. According to literary historian Ovidiu Morar, Perpessicius and novelist Zaharia Stancu were also the only literary men to speak out against the marginalization of Felix Aderca, who was also Jewish.

These events were taking place in the first year of World War II, just months before Carol's regime lost credibility for the peaceful cession of Romanian territories to the Soviet Union and Hungary (see Soviet occupation of Bessarabia and Northern Bukovina, Second Vienna Award). This was followed by the proclamation of a new Axis-aligned fascist regime, the National Legionary State, formed as an uneasy partnership between the Iron Guard and Conducător Ion Antonescu. Perpessicius left ironic notes on National Legionary propaganda, recording the Romanian Radio speakers' disjointed and unprofessional praise for the new government, the self-proclaimed purge of Romanian culture by the Guard's Legionary critics, or the rapid fascization of modernist poets such as Ion Barbu (who wrote a special poem for Adolf Hitler). The Iron Guard-appointed new head of Revista Fundațiilor Regale, D. Caracostea, temporarily suspended the contributions of critics whom he considered supporters of Jewish writers: Perpessicius, Cioculescu and Streinu. A contemporary anti-fascist and modernist literary historian Eugen Lovinescu deemed it "idiotic".

Legionary government broke apart in early 1941, when the Iron Guard's Bucharest Rebellion caused Antonescu to reclaim all power, and later to join Romania into the Nazi German-led invasion of the Soviet Union. Perpessicius was isolated from political events. In 1942, with Cioculescu, Constantinescu, Streinu, and Vianu, he contributed essays dedicated to their mentor Lovinescu, celebrating his 60th birthday. They were collected in a single volume, published by Editura Vremea the following year—months before Lovinescu's death. In 1943, he published a second volume of Eminescu's Opere, which included the alternative versions of lyrical works, including the Luceafărul poem. In 1944, he followed up with the essay volume Jurnal de lector ("A Reader's Diary"), which also included Eminesciana, a collection of his Revista Fundațiilor Regale articles on the 19th-century poet. Also that year, he completed a third volume of Eminescu's Opere, comprising anthumous variants of poems, from Doina to Kamadeva.

Soon after Antonescu was ousted during the August 23 Coup of 1944 and Romania began cooperating with the Allies, Perpessicius made his return to the public arena. For a while in 1944–1945, he joined the Romanian Writers' Society Board, replacing the resigned Zaharia Stancu. The major decision taken by the body was to exclude 28 of its members on grounds that they had actively supported fascist ideologies, which, literary historian Victor Durnea notes, was an arbitrary selection. This purge was followed by the integration of 20 authors known for their communist or left-wing convictions. In late 1944, Perpessicius also joined the Romanian Society for Friendship with the Soviet Union (ARLUS), set up by the newly legalized Romanian Communist Party in order to attract intellectuals and professionals to its cause, and supporting the Soviet occupation forces. He was, with Mihai Ralea, vice president of ARLUS' Literary Section (presided over by Mihail Sadoveanu). In May 1945, he represented ARLUS at the funeral of Mihail Sebastian, who had been killed in a road accident, and contributed one of Sebastian's obituaries in Revista Fundațiilor Regale. Shortly after Lovinescu's death, Perpessicius also sat on the commission granting a memorial award, presented to aspiring authors such as Ștefan Augustin Doinaș. In 1945, he made the last of several sporadic visits to Brăila, where his mother still resided.

He had by that stage resumed his activity as a chronicler, publishing articles in Familia, Gazeta Literară, Lumea, Tribuna, Universul, as well as in Steaua, Jurnalul de Dimineață and Tânărul Scriitor. With Rosetti and Jacques Byck, Perpessicius authored a 1946 literature textbook for the 7th year of secondary education (final year of high school). The following year, he published the 5th volume of his Mențiuni critice.

=== During communism ===
Perpessicius' career was affected in various ways by Romania's communist regime. In 1948, he joined the editing staff of Viața Românească magazine, and, upon the proposal of Gala Galaction, was made a corresponding member of the newly reshaped Romanian Academy. In 1949, again on Galaction's proposal, he was considered for full membership the academy (at the same time as Stancu, Alexandru Al. Philippide and poet Mihai Beniuc), serving as head of section at its Institute of Literary History and Folklore until 1954. Also in 1949, Perpessicius joined the communist-endorsed Writers' Union of Romania, created on the Writers' Society structure. A new volume of Eminescu's Opere (the first to feature previously unpublished works) and an edition of Însemnare a călătoriei mele ("Account of My Travel") by the early 19th century author Dinicu Golescu were both published in 1952. Perpessicius was also contributing prefaces to books published by Editura Cartea Rusă, a newly created institution which exclusively published works of Russian and Soviet literature. He received the State Prize for 1954, in recognition for his work in editing Eminescu, and, on June 21, 1955, received full Academy membership, with Camil Petrescu as rapporteur. At around the same time, Perpessicius focused some of his studies on the work of Lazăr Șăineanu, a linguist and folklorist whom specialized criticism of the time had come to ignore.

Despite official endorsement, his relationship with the new authorities had its moments of tension. An unsigned 1953 article in the Communist Party's main daily, Scînteia, accused the author of being indifferent to the Marxist-Leninist view of "class struggle", and noted that the Opere volume's introduction cited "reactionary" critics Titu Maiorescu, Mihail Dragomirescu and Gheorghe Bogdan-Duică without "assuming a critical stance". Some of his own earlier works, like those of the colleagues of his generation, were subjected to official censorship, and several were not given approval for publication. A relaxation of political pressures on the literary environment followed in the late 1950s, when communist leader Gheorghe Gheorghiu-Dej embarked on the path of controlled De-Stalinization, but totalitarianism still had direct consequences on the critic's life and career. Perpessicius' son Dumitru D. Panaitescu, a student at the University of Bucharest during the mid-1950s, was arrested by the Securitate secret police and implicated in the "Dardena trial", becoming a political prisoner of the communist regime. Panaitescu had been found guilty of sedition, for having joined Mihai Stere Dedena and others in organizing a dissident Marxist circle, which sympathized with the Hungarian Revolution of 1956 and stood behind the Bucharest student protest. The same year, at a Writers' Union congress consecrating the rehabilitation of formerly-censored Tudor Arghezi, Perpessicius made negative comments on the impact of Romanian Socialist Realism: "The Arghezi case is, without doubt, one of the most painful cases literature has known over the past ten years".

Perpessicius was appointed head of the Academy Library in 1957, with a mission to create the Museum of Romanian Literature (MLR). Unable to provide adequate facilities for the Library, he presented the authorities with a series of proposals, but only received an increase in the funds allocated, and resigned. He created the museum itself, and presided over it until his death. Also in 1957, he collected his various essays on literary history and Romanian folklore, as Mențiuni de istoriografie literară și folclor ("Mentions in Literary Historiography and Folklore"), followed by two more volumes in 1961 and 1964 respectively. Perpessicius returned with a new volume of Opere in 1958, by gathering the printed versions of Mihai Eminescu's original drafts and apocrypha. The 6th Opere volume of 1963 comprised the poet's folklore and paremiology collection, together with his works of direct folkloric inspiration. In 1964–1965, he edited Eminescu's selected works in an Editura pentru literatură edition, followed by a similar edition of Mateiu Caragiale's works.

His 75th birthday of 1966 came at an interval when newly instated communist leader Nicolae Ceaușescu was effecting liberalization measures. It was celebrated nationally, and the authorities granted him the Order of Cultural Merit 1st class. He also began publishing his own Opere, largely based on Mențiuni critice, in four volumes (the last of which was posthumous). The following year, Perpessicius' Museum was faced with a crisis, having been evicted out of its original quarters and provisionally relocated to an apartment on Șoseaua Kiseleff. The matter was resolved when the director appealed to his friend Arghezi, by then a prominent cultural figure, and who managed to have the MLR relocated to a spacious location once occupied by the defunct Romanian-Russian Museum. One year before his death, Perpessicius also founded the MLR archive's press venue, Manuscriptum. By 1968, he was also collaborating on the new edition of Gazeta Literară, with the column Lecturi intermitente ("Intermittent Readings"), and collected his lifelong articles to be republished as a series of volumes.

Having fallen ill and losing much of his eyesight, Perpessicius died on the morning of March 29, 1971, after prolonged and acute suffering. He was buried in Bellu cemetery. Two posthumous volumes were published as tribute during the same year: Lecturi intermitente with Editura Dacia, and Eminesciana with Editura Minerva (forwarded by his son, Dumitru D. Panaitescu).

== Critic and historian ==
=== Cultural context ===
Perpessicius is seen by various researchers as one of the most authoritative and recognizable figures among the Romanian critics of the interwar. Tudor Vianu thus described him as "one of the purest figures of writers who came to develop in the period between the two wars." The generic group also includes George Călinescu, Șerban Cioculescu, Pompiliu Constantinescu, Eugen Lovinescu, Vladimir Streinu, Tudor Vianu and others. This entire generation of critics stood for the legacy of Junimea, a literary society influential in the second half of the 19th century. They followed in the footsteps of Junimist leader and philosopher Titu Maiorescu, who was known for his rationalist approach, his conservative suspicion of nationalism, his calls for pragmatic Westernization and controlled modernization, his advocacy of professionalization in science and literature, and, in particular, his critique of literary didacticism in favor of "art for art's sake". Lovinescu referred to himself and his colleagues as "the third post-Maiorescian generation", and, in the 1942 homage to Lovinescu, Perpessicius's essay, called "deepest and most convincing" by 21st century literary historian Nicolae Manolescu, focused primarily on Lovinescu's own study of Maiorescu. Z. Ornea notes how the analogy with Junimea only has limited application, given that the interwar critics all espoused historicistic beliefs to varying degrees, and contextualized literary movements in a manner rejected by Maiorescu. Perpessicius' other mentors, Vianu notes, were critics and academics of diverse backgrounds: Ovid Densusianu, Dumitru Evolceanu and Ioan Bianu.

Out of this environment, Perpessicius emerged with a personal style, characterized by literary historian Paul Cernat as both "eclectic" and "impressionist". Cernat also notes that Perpessicius parts with the Junimist tradition of combative, and ideally "masculine" criticism, establishing an ideological alternative: "The utopia of 'Perpessician' criticism is an aesthetic ecumenism purged of sociological, ethical and ethnic intrusions, and likewise of dogmatic, rationalist-positivist, prejudice." Contantinescu referred to his friend as "the only Romanian critic not to have practiced dogmatism" and "our most civilized critic, both spiritually and ethically".

According to literary critic Ștefan Cazimir, Perpessicius and George Călinescu are "our only 'poets and critics' who honor both terms of the sequence", while, in Cernat's view, Perpessicius and his friend Ion Pillat stood out for having internalized "the collaboration between 'poet' and 'critic' ". This particularity resulted in the literary mix of De la Chateaubriand la Mallarmé, partly inspired by the ideas of Albert Thibaudet: here, the critic blurs the lines between views expressed by writers and views expressed about the writers, using fragments of narratives to deduce critical thought. As a complement to his stated preference for lyricism in prose, Perpessicius also believed that the modern novel and novella were interfering with each other to the point where distinction became "absolute gratuitousness" (a vision discussed in his Mențiuni critice).

This tendency toward aesthetic relativism owed inspiration to the theories of French Symbolist Remy de Gourmont, and brought Perpessicius into conflict with Lovinescu, whose more rigid version of Impressionism was based on the views of Émile Faguet. Initially, the elder critic had expressed approval of Repertoriul critic, calling Perpessicius himself "a man of taste, a graceful stylist and an ornate spirit". A major point of contention between the two figures emerged in the late 1920s, when Lovinescu published his Istoria literaturii române contemporane ("The History of Contemporary Romanian Literature"). The work was received with reserve by Perpessicius, who, in his chronicle at Cuvântul, objected to his senior's belief in the inferiority of lyricism over both narratives and epic poetry, and also to his dismissive treatment of avant-garde writers and of paraliterature. He declared himself disappointed by Lovinescu having disregarded the post-Symbolist poetry of George Bacovia, and criticized him for deriding the lyricized prose of traditionalist author Mihail Sadoveanu. He commented with irony on Lovinescu's primarily historicist perspective, arguing that it closely resembled what he also criticized in the didacticism of Mihail Dragomirescu and Henric Sanielevici, and that his rival's Sburătorul society aggravated "the dependence on literary schools". He recognized Lovinescu's mentorship in his 1941-1942 essays, joining what literary historian Mircea Iorgulescu defines as "Lovinescu's first posterity" (also grouping, alongside the other authors of the 1942 volume, the younger-aged Sibiu Literary Circle).

=== Modernist chronicler ===
Unlike many of his generation colleagues, Perpessicius welcomed the birth of an avant-garde movement in his native country, and offered encouragement to some of its members. According to Paul Cernat, his appreciation for the avant-garde was in general reciprocated, the more radical authors viewing Perpessicius with a degree of esteem they refused to all other leading interwar chroniclers. With Antologia poeților de azi, Perpessicius and Pillat effected what Cernat calls "the critical assimilation of autochthonous Symbolism and modernism", and, citing Șerban Cioculescu, an expansion outside "the traditional realm of Romanian poetry, which had penetrated public consciousness through its cultural and didactic elements." The book was based on similar anthologies of German or French literature, as compiled by Kurt Pinthus and Paul Fort. As part of his dislike for historicist definitions, he most often refused to differentiate between the various "-isms" within the current, referring to the avant-garde in general as the "far left" of modernism. This approach partly echoed the pronouncements of his fellow critics, among them Const. T. Emilian, author of the first study on Romania's cutting-edge modernism, a work noted for its ultra-conservative, nationalist and antisemitic conclusions. He did not share Emilian's viewpoint and, in line with his pronouncements against a "Jewish quota", explicitly rejected the belief that avant-garde poetry was subversive, arguing instead that, at its best, the current displayed a modern "virtuosity". In his review of Emilian's polemical study of the avant-garde, Perpessicus spoke of the author's "rigid and timorous" approach to the subject.

Perpessicius was especially sympathetic to poet Tudor Arghezi, a former Symbolist who had created a mixture of radical modernism and traditionalism, and who was hailed as a hero by the avant-garde circles. According to Cernat, the critic was the first-ever professional to declare Arghezi compatible with and comparable to Mihai Eminescu, thus cementing into mainstream verdict what had previously existed only as an isolated avant-garde claim. He was also interested in the work of another avant-garde champion, the suicidal clerk Urmuz, being one of the first to take Urmuz's work seriously, producing an essay which Nicolae Manolescu describes as "the most profound in our country's interwar criticism." Perpessicius stripped Urmuz's fragmentary and absurdist prose of its satirical elements, believing to have found profound cultural meanings, such as elements of fairy tales, echoes from Norse and Greek mythology, and allusions to the puppet theater, all of which created "new, daring and amazing, forms".

His essays included ample comments on Urmuz's following, discussing his influence on diverse authors, avant-garde as well as mainstream: Arghezi, Geo Bogza, Jacques G. Costin, Adrian Maniu, Tudor Mușatescu, Sașa Pană, Stephan Roll and Ion Vinea. He focuses such pieces on Costin, whom he believed was an important author with "sharp traits" and "great subtlety", different from Urmuz in that he was "good-humored". He believed that Costin's parody of Don Quixote needed only "a mild process of purification" in order to join the "Romanian models" of its genre. Other avant-garde affiliates favorably reviewed by Perpessicius include: Ion Călugăru, whose fantasy writings and folk story parodies he considered suited for "the heaven of dreams"; Benjamin Fondane, a "reputable essayist" in whose poetic work, which reinterpreted the rural landscape, "patriarchy suffered and made itself seem outraged"; and the post-Symbolist Ion Minulescu, whose 1930 volume Strofe pentru toată lumea ("Stanzas for All") he deemed "fantasy poetry [...] transfiguring the every day and the trend [...], raising jokes to the level of poetic principle and conversing with God in a simpler, more citizen-like [...], more democratic [...] than [Minulescu] was conversing with himself some twenty years ago". Perpessicius also backed Fondane's verdict according to which Minulescu was "the first bell-ringer of Romania's lyrical revolt". His interest also covered Mateiu Caragiale, but his surviving renditions of the latter's texts have been criticized for being selective.

Despite this interest in innovation, Perpessicius treated the work of various avant-garde authors with noted reserve, and attempted to correct tendencies he considered negative. This attitude surfaced in his reviews of Ilarie Voronca's poetry, when, although not averse to the subconscious explorations of Dadaism and Surrealism, Perpessicius voiced his concern that the resulting imagery was chaotic, and therefore hard to merge into the lyrical tradition. This reproach he combined with earlier objections: in his review of Voronca's 1923 collection of Decadent poems, Restriști ("Tribulations"), he first criticized the poet for introducing neologisms or barbarisms to literary Romanian. Referring to Voronca's later Imagist and Surrealist volume Plante și animale, Perpessicius noted: "such poetry impresses, but does not charm. It strikes, but it does maintain. That's because it is fragmentary poetry." This kind of "prudent" conclusions, Cernat proposes, made the critic resemble all his colleagues of the moderate mainstream. Although discussing the shortcomings of Voronca's literature, Paul Cernat notes, Perpessicius was overall his most sympathetic of his more important early reviewers. Praise became the norm after 1928, when Voronca parted with radicalism and, through his Ulise (Romanian for "Ulysses"), elaborated a personal style at the junction of visionary tradition and introspective modernity. He believed this change had brought Voronca close to the types of poetry illustrated by classics such as Novalis, Walt Whitman and Eminescu, or by former Dadaist doyen Tristan Tzara in his The Approximate Man, while protesting that the Romanian Writers' Society had failed to honor Voronca with a prize.

Perpessicius was welcoming of other Surrealist productions, among which was a cryptic prose poem by Stephan Roll, Moartea Eleonorei ("Eleonora's Death"). He also enjoyed Ion Vinea's lyrical and marginally-Surrealist novel Paradisul suspinelor ("The Paradise of Sighs"), which he described as "a picturesque theater of reflexive puppets" emerging from the combined "virtuosity" of "poet, psychoanalyst and Surrealist aesthete". Other texts by Perpessicius focused on the impact of psychoanalysis on modernist and psychological novel authors such as Felix Aderca, Gib Mihăescu and Hortensia Papadat-Bengescu, or experimented in art criticism, with a review of Marcel Janco's vignette portraits for Antologia.... Perpessicius viewed the latter drawings as "masks", "macerated by outer flames and drained of blood" and displaying "great vital force." He also took an interest in the illustrations contributed to Voronca and Pană by, respectively, Constantin Brâncuși and Victor Brauner, expressing admiration for their "primitivist" aesthetics. Sympathetic to Mircea Eliade, leader of the new radical modernism of the 1930s (a current emerging from Trăirism), he also offered positive reviews to other members of Eliade's generation, among them Mihail Sebastian (in particular for the controversial novel De două mii de ani...) and Petru Comarnescu (for Homo americanus, a group of essays on the United States). According to one assessment, he was also the only critic of his generation to defend Camil Petrescu's novel Ultima noapte de dragoste, întâia noapte de război, criticized from early on for being sharply divided into two seemingly unrelated sections—in his assessment, this arrangement resonated with a profound message.

=== Eminescu's exegete ===
Having reportedly developed a passion for Eminescu's poetry while still a student, Perpessicius was part of a generation poised on recovering and popularizing their predecessor. According to Perpessicius' own editor, Ileana Ene, "Our literary history has had the exceptional chance of finding in Perpessicius the ideal editor for a monumental edition of Eminescu's Opere." Early on, while closely following the various editions of collected works by various Romanian authors, the author voiced protests against what he believed was the political establishment's tendency to overlook a national poet: "we have no monograph on the poet, we have no critical edition [...] and we are even further from the prospect of a monument. We nonetheless have a Ministry of the Arts, and we carry on erecting, instead of statues [...], blocks of granite and beams of steel, more perishable than the paper stanzas of [Eminescu's] Floare albastră." By compiling his own edition, Perpessicius also sought to point out perceived flaws in previous selections, including that of his Junimist model Maiorescu—an approach revered by his political adversary, the post-Junimist historian and critic Nicolae Iorga. Both Iorga and Pompiliu Constantinescu offered special praise to Perpessicius' detailed study of Eminescu's biography on a strictly chronological basis (a chronology mirrored by the sorting of poem variants). Vianu saw the book as a major progress in understanding Eminescu's poetry. Noting that, in all, Perpessicius reviewed and transcribed some 15,000 pages of Eminescu's manuscripts, a prospect others had avoided, Vianu stated: "No one will ever be able to study Eminescu, the history and connections of each of his works, their genesis and echoes in literary historiography and criticism, without using Perpessicius' critical edition as their starting point."

One major contribution made by Perpessicius to the field of Eminescu studies is his uncovering and publication of posthumous works. Vianu noted that, together with the bio-bibliographical writings of George Călinescu, Perpessicius' version of Opere initiated "the most significant transformation in posterity's image of the Romanians' greatest writer [Eminescu]." This helped highlight the successive periods in Eminescu's work, from his Romanticism of the 1860s to his epic interpretations of Romanian folklore, early Balkan myths and Norse mythology. An entire section of Opere's fifth volume sorted Eminescu's random and often unused drafts, collectively titled Moloz ("Debris"), thus allowing readers to differentiate between Eminescu's moments of inspiration and his routine poetic exercises. Perpessicius' research is also credited with having tracked down and compared the various drafts of Luceafărul, a process which, according to Ene, might not have otherwise been attempted. The late article collection Eminesciana, was criticized by some for being overall inferior to Perpessicius' other contributions, a conclusion which, Ene believes, is owed to some of the pieces having been prompted by public events. The author himself saw it as a diary and document of his studies, with "a certain kind of usefulness".

=== Equidistant positioning and related controversy ===
A controversy surrounding Perpessicius' contributions as chronicler and theorist emerged during his lifetime, centered on perceptions that he was neither polemically engaged nor a proponent of hierarchies, but that he preferred to write equidistantly. Contrary to his contemporaries, Perpessicius believed the work of a critic to be not the imposition of a direction, but the "registry office" and panorama of naturally occurring trends, an idea notably present in the title of his article În tinda unei registraturi ("In the Parlor of a Registry Office"). The text spoke in favor of diversity and against "sectarianism": "I shall weed out [...] any sectarian prejudice and shall strive to comment on any work", because "the critic would do better not to consider novelty a scarecrow." Elsewhere, he cited Thibaudet for having inspired in him "great comprehension" and the ideal of "plurality in tastes". In a 1962 interview with Luceafărul, Perpessicius stated: "young writers [...] should have the habit of reading the critics, but should not obey their assessments blindly. Just as there are writers who request any verdict, no matter how severe, as long as it is sincere, there are those pompous critics, who have never doubted the justness of their verdicts. Our experience from both sides of the barricade has taught us that both are wrong. Albeit mediocre, the middle way is the golden way."

Reproaches on this perspective were notably voiced by his colleague and rival Lovinescu, who, in his Istoria literaturii..., argued that critics were supposed to resemble the folk legend hero Meșterul Manole, who sacrificed his wife in the name of art, and claimed that, contrary to this ideal, Perpessicius had not waived "affective connections", particularly when discussing Arghezi. Lovinescu argued that his preference for modernism "embraces almost everything in contemporary literature, down to its minor products", an attitude which he equated with "abdication". George Călinescu discussed Perpessicius' reviews of "the most insignificant books", which, he claimed, consecrated his belonging to a "brilliant generation of secondary teachers" ill-adapted to the job of critics, lacking both "general ideas" and the ability of detecting "a work's hierarchic place" (in support of which he mentioned Perpessicius's claim that novelist Eugen Goga was one of Romania's best). Călinescu argued that any negative comment made by his colleague could "seem like praise" by being "sweetened" from one phrase to the next, making reference to his use of euphemisms, "digressions" and "excessive delicacy". He also called Mențiuni critice a "precious bibliographic guide".

Similar judgments were issued from various sides of the cultural spectrum. Although himself a collaborator of Perpessicius, Vladimir Streinu once referred to him as "the flower girl of our literature". While Tudor Vianu believed the "discreet" Perpessicius able of "biting irony", he also claimed: "The critic is at times too indulgent and, as a consequence, the contrasts in his appreciations are somewhat toned down. But how many young people did not absorb fortifying strengths from Perpessicius' benevolent verdicts?" Perpessicius' rejection of "sectarianism" was unfavorably reviewed by Cioculescu in a 1928 article for Adevărul, which prompted a reply from Perpessicius. For Alexandru Al, Philippide, the second volume of Antologia poeților de azi was a sample of such leniency, to the point of becoming "embarrassingly instructive" by including talentless authors. He noted: "Seventy real poets in a quarter of a century is an a priori impossibility. [...] In such conditions, poetry presents itself as a real scourge, like some dangerous pestilence, almost like a social peril. And in such circumstances an anthology as horrifyingly complete as that of Mr. Pillat and Mr. Perpessicius appears to be disastrous. It is made to implant the belief that poets are to be found in a sum of individuals who, perhaps, had they been lacking such 'consecration', would be growing disillusioned and turn back into decent men, brave citizens and diligent clerks". The dispute touched on Perpessicius' own relationship with the avant-garde. In his account of Voronca's departure from the Surrealist group (part of a 1933 letter addressed to Fondane), Roll sarcastically downplayed his former colleague's success, alleging: "Only Perpessicius smothered [Voronca] in slobbery, grandmotherly, kisses; only Perpessicius showered with gifts, produced licks of the tongue, telephone calls and accolades."

These themes of criticism were revisited by newer generation of critics. According to Eugen Simion, in following the Symbolist path of Remy de Gourmont, Perpessicius "gazes without discrimination over a Surrealist poem or a late Romantic work." Expanding on his take on the conflicting perspectives of Romanian criticism, Cernat observed: "Not at all lacking in critical spirit, Perpessicius most obviously belongs to the category of 'feminine', 'artistic' and 'poetic' critics [...]." Cernat also notes that, despite common perception, Perpessicius was "coherent with himself". Writing in 2002, literary historian Florin Mihăilescu argued that "directional criticism" as exemplified by Maiorescu, Constantin Dobrogeanu-Gherea, Garabet Ibrăileanu and Lovinescu, "will always be superior to the eternally well-disposed and always equable reviewer's office, à la Perpessicius".

== Poetry and fiction ==
=== War poet ===
Perpessicius' early war poems comprise the larger part of Scut și targă volume. Its other sections of the book were identified by Vianu as political satire directed at the regime changes in Greater Romania. Like its immediate successor Itinerar sentimental, Scut și targă was seen by Vianu as among "the most delicate and spiritual inspirations of [their] epoch." From a stylistic perspective, Scut și targă fitted within the scope of Symbolist poetry and, as Perpessicius himself is said to have recounted, marked by the influence of Jules Laforgue. George Călinescu, who notes that their apparently "detached" tone allows glimpses of a "profound emotion", also stresses that the poems are indebted to the school of Arthur Rimbaud. He thus sees a connection between Rimbaud's The Sleeper of the Vale and scenes of "solar putrefaction" he associates with Perpessicius' lines for men killed by firing squads:

Prin viile din preajmă e-un strașnic chiuit
De greieri ce cu mustul s-au îmbătat și joacă
Și țipă să trezească pe cei ce-ntro-băltoacă
De sânge, zac în șanțuri, sătui de chefuit.

Translation:

A grand shriek roams the surrounding vineyards,
From crickets tipsy with must and dancing
And yelling to wake up those who, in ponds of blood,
Rest in gutters, all weary of boozing.

For Călinescu, Perpessicius combined a Rimbaudesque appetite for "vagrancy" with a love for his native Bărăgan Plain, providing him with "a sense for the vigorous eternity of the fields, indifferent as they are to human waste". This, he argued, was made obvious by stanzas such as:

Florile de câmpie le cosesc mitraliere
Și cu sucurile scurse spală rănile mortale
De eroi căzuți în tină ca și simple efemere,
Ce adorm pe veci pe-o floare, îngropându-se-n petale.

Singură, în tot cuprinsul, floarea stelelor polare
Înflorind spontan în ghiolul de argint ca dintr-o seră,
Scutură multiple jerbe și coroane funerare
Peste flori și peste oameni secerați de mitralieră.

Translation:

Machine guns mow down the flowers of the field
And with the juices spilled they clean the mortal wounds
Of heroes sunk in mud like mere ephemeridae,
Who fall into the sleep of ages on flowers, burying themselves into the petals.

Alone in all the setting, the flower of lodestars
Spontaneously blooming the silvery lake as if in a greenhouse
Drops multiple festoons and wreaths
Over flowers and men whom the machine gun has mowed down.

=== Intimism ===
Perpessicius' lyrical poetry slowly evolved toward "intimism", which implies a focus on the immediate aspects of urban life and ample references to the interior world. George Călinescu includes him in this category around non-Symbolist poets such as Emanoil Bucuța, Alexandru Claudian and Gavril Rotică, noting that what separates him from the group is having "multiple layers, owed to his richer background." The individual approach, called by Călinescu "Symbolist and bookish", is present in pieces such as one dedicated to home ownership:

Îți mulțumesc, o! Doamne, că-n fine am o casă!
Că s-a sfârșit calvarul și pot să intru-n clasă
C-o față mai senină, cu zâmbetul amabil
Al omului ce are un domiciliu stabil...

Translation:

I thank you, o! Lord, for at last I own a house!
That the ordeal is over and I may enter the classroom
With a more serene face, with the amiable smile
Of a man who has a stable domicile...

In Cazimir's view, there is a close connection between Perpessicus' "bookish" poems and some verse works by George Călinescu, particularly as melancholic contributions to Romanian humor. Cazimir believes that Perpessicius' distinguishing notes are the "suspicion toward all sorts of pathos", "prosaic touches" and the recourse to "cultural references". As an example of this technique, he cites the poem Toamnă ("Autumn"):

Găzarii de prin depărtări se-ntorc
Și-mbie lumea cu petrol de lampă,
În ambianță-i un ecou Laforgue
Și-un ton dintr-o neerlandeză stampă.

Translation:

Gasmen are returning from faraway places
And tempt people with their paraffin,
The ambiance carries an echo from Laforgue
And a tone from some Dutch print.

According to Călinescu himself, while the type of "intimism" had roots reaching as far back as medieval poet Alain Chartier, Perpessicius' other tendency was a form of Neoclassicism which directly referenced the major figures of Latin literature: Catullus, Horace, Ovid and Sextus Propertius. The latter influence, he argues, explained how Perpessicius return adoption of elegy as a form of poetic expression, in which "melancholy is without neurosis, but only slightly purple, like a funerary urn." In what Călinescu deems "such an excellent poem", Perpessicius depicts the Mureș River as his Styx:

Dar Mureșul e-n vale cu apa-i cătrănită,
Podarul, soi de Caron, cu luntrea ghiftuită
Ne-așteaptă să ne treacă pe celalt țărm, cu bacul,
Și ni-i așa de bine că-aici ne-am face vacul
Și-n ostrovul de tihnă, ne-am veșnici hodina
De n-ar grăbi podarul și n-ar scădea lumina.

Translation:

But downhill is the Mureș with its blackened waters,
The collector, like a Charon, with his bloated boat
Awaits to take us to the other shore, on the ferry,
And we feel so good that we would stay for ages
And, on the quiet eyot, we'd be resting for eternity
Were the collector not hurrying us and the light not dimming.

Perpessicius' work in fiction includes several unfinished novels. In addition to Veninul, they include Fatma sau focul de paie ("Fatma or the Straw Fire") and Amor academic ("Academic Love Affair"), both of them mentioned in his profile for the 1925 Antologia poeților de azi. According to literary historian Ioana Pârvulescu, who suspects that Amor academic was Perpessicius' intended homage to Yvoria Secoșanu, the author portrayed himself under the fictional names Mototolea (from mototol, "wuss") and Pentapolin (the shepherd king in Don Quixote).

For the final half of his life, Perpessicius' Eminescu studies took precedence over his contributions to both poetry and fiction. Reflecting on this situation, Tudor Vianu noted: "We may at times experience regret that the poet, the literary historian, the prose writer [in Perpessicius] have consented to such a sacrifice. But we cannot prevent ourselves from saying that Perpessicius has thus fulfilled himself through the best part of his moral nature, through his modesty, generosity and dedication." In addition to this and his translations from Francis Jammes, he also rendered some of Charles Baudelaire's poetry, being noted by Tudor Vianu for his "beautiful" translation of The Kind-hearted Servant of Whom You Were Jealous (part of Baudelaire's Les Fleurs du mal).

== Legacy ==
Perpessicius' contribution and biography were the subject of several later volumes of critical interpretations, beginning with the 1971 Excurs sentimental Perpessicius ("Perpessicius, a Sentimenal Excursion"), dedicated to his memory by the Museum of Romanian Literature. His work was itself anthologized, most notably in a 1971 edition by Eugen Simion. Several of his Eminescu transcripts, intended as the final volumes of Opere, were still unpublished by the time of his death, leaving the MLR to group them into later editions. The posthumous series includes a 1977 volume of Eminescu's prose and exercises in drama, as well as records of his early participation in the development of Romanian theater with Iorgu Caragiale's troupe. His renditions of Mateiu Caragiale's texts, like the similar notebooks kept by Alexandru Rosetti, appear to have been lost forever under mysterious circumstances. Perpessicus' own private notebooks were only published in fragments, in various 1970s issues of Manuscriptum; the majority of these notes are kept away from the public eye, and, according to his express wish, can only be published at an unknown term in the future.

His native home in Brăila was torn down in 1977, as the result of error, and rebuilt soon after with more modern materials. The new building became the Perpessicius Memorial House, hosting a permanent exhibit of his personal objects (including more than 7,000 of the books he owned). It also features a marble bust of the author, the work of Romanian-born Canadian sculptor Nicăpetre. A teacher training school in the city was named the D. P. Perpessicius in the critic's honor. The 17 volumes of his Mihai Eminescu edition form part of an Eminescu book collection at the Botoșani County Library, which in turn resulted from an exceptionally large donation made after the Romanian Revolution of 1989.

In 2006, Adevărul journalist Christian Levant investigated the Dedena affair, concluding that Panaitescu Jr.'s arrest, like that of other members of his Marxist circle, was made possible by the actions of an informant. In Levant's view, that person was Eugen Florescu, who later made a career in the Communist Party and, after the Revolution, in the nationalist Greater Romania Party, having served in the Senate until 2004.
