= Romanescu =

Romanescu is a surname. Notable people with the surname include:

- Elena Alistar-Romanescu
- Marcel Romanescu
- Nicolae Romanescu
  - Nicolae Romanescu Park

== See also ==
- Romanesco broccoli
- Romanesco dialect
