= George Stephănescu =

Romanian composer

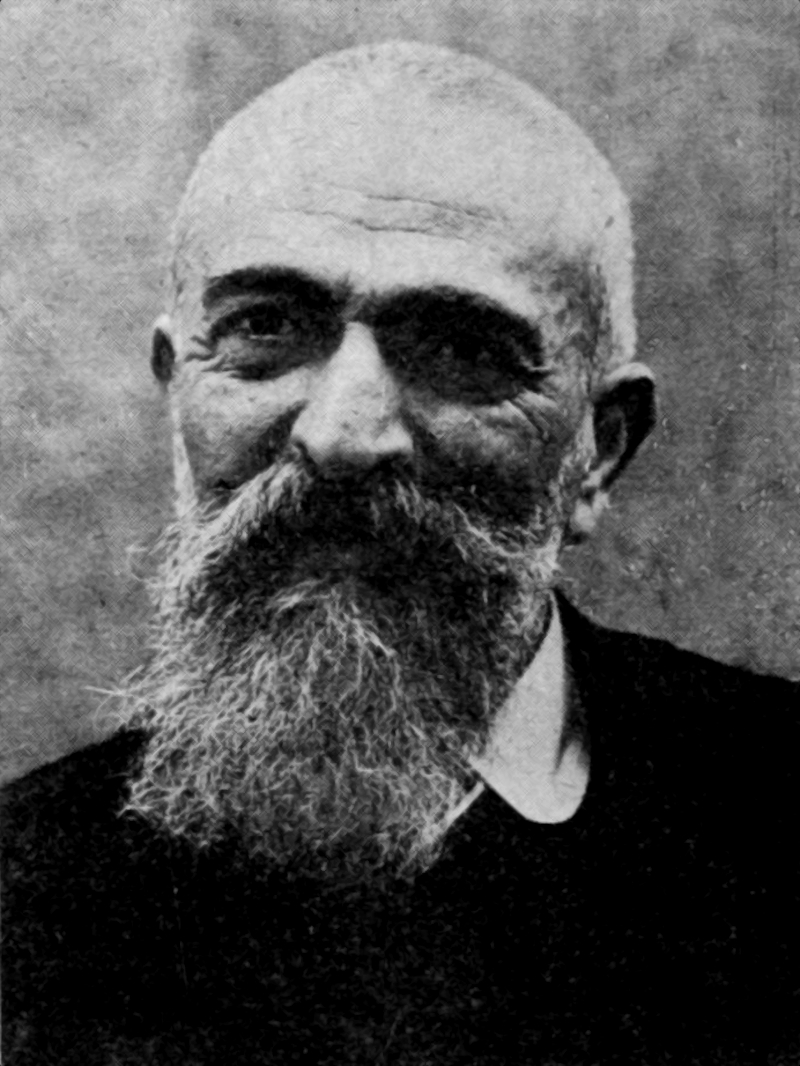
- George Stephănescu
- Born: George Stephănescu; 13 December 1843; Bucharest, Romania
- Died: 25 April 1925 (aged 81); Bucharest, Romania
- Education: Bucharest Academy of Music
- Occupation: Opera composer
- Employer: National Theater of Bucharest
- Relatives: Eugeniu Ștefănescu-Est (son)

George Stephănescu (13 December 1843 – 25 April 1925) was a Romanian composer, one of the main figures in Romanian national opera.

Stephănescu was born and died in Bucharest. He graduated from the Bucharest Academy of Music. In 1877, Stephănescu was appointed conductor of the National Theater orchestra and Singing teacher at the Academy.

While teaching the opera singers at the Academy, he aimed to gradually develop the National Theater's musical repertoire from vaudevilles to musical comedies and finally to opera. In 1885, he founded the first opera company in the Kingdom of Romania. It disbanded in 1902 when the government cut its financial support.

Stephănescu is noted for having used works by many poets as librettos or texts for his compositions — among them, the locals Vasile Alecsandri, Mihai Eminescu, Traian Demetrescu, Alexandru Vlahuţă and the foreigners Victor Hugo and Alfred de Musset.

His son was the writer Eugeniu Ștefănescu-Est.

== Works ==
- Symphony in A Major (1869)
- Peste Dunăre (opera, 1880)
- Sânziana şi Pepelea (opera, 1880)
- National Overture (1882)
- Scaiul bărbaţilor (opera, 1885)
- Cometa (opera, 1900)
- Petra (opera, 1902)
