= Eugeniu Sperantia =

Romanian poet, aesthetician, essayist, sociologist and philosopher

Eugeniu Sperantia (May 18 [O.S. May 6] 1888 – January 11/12, 1972) was a Romanian poet, aesthetician, essayist, sociologist and philosopher.

He was born in Bucharest to folklorist Theodor Speranția and his wife Elena (née Cruceanu), a relative of poet Mihail Cruceanu. He attended primary and high school in his native city, graduating in 1906. That year, he made his published debut, in Ovid Densusianu's Vieața Nouă. Prior to that, he had frequented Alexandru Macedonski's circle. In 1910, he graduated from the philosophy faculty of the University of Bucharest. Two years later, he received a doctorate in literature and philosophy; his thesis dealt with pragmatic apriorism. He took specialty courses in Germany from 1913 to 1914. A high school teacher from the time he was still a student, Sperantia was dispatched to the newly acquired Transylvania province in the wake of World War I, serving as director of higher education for Cluj (1919–1921), professor at the Oradea law academy (1929–1934) and professor of sociology and philosophy of law at the University of Cluj (1934–1949). He contributed poems and articles to Flacăra, Vieața Nouă, Cele trei Crișuri, Românul literar, Revista celorlalți, Farul, Revue Roumaine, Luceafărul, Gând românesc, Gândirea, Steaua and Familia, sometimes using the pen names Eugenius, Genică, Corina Lazzariny, Victor Olimp, Victor Spoială, Victor Talpă and Cerchez.

Sperantia was an early participant in the local Symbolist movement, drawing praise from Macedonski, Densusianu and Gheorghe Bogdan-Duică. Hailed, at the same time, by Constantin Rădulescu-Motru for his contributions to philosophy and sociology, he was a professor shaped in the spirit of Titu Maiorescu's school. His published books include collections of Symbolist poems (Zvonuri din necunoscut, 1921; Pasul umbrelor și al veciei, 1930, Romanian Writers' Society prize; Sus, 1939), a novel (Casa cu nalbă, 1916), aesthetic studies (Frumosul ca înaltă suferință, 1921; "Papillons" de Schumann, 1934, Romanian Academy prize), memoirs (Figuri universitare, 1967; Amintiri din lumea literară, 1967), short biographies of musicians, philosophical essays, studies of psychology (Psihologia gândirii, 1922) and of philosophy of law (Principii fundamentale de filosofie juridică, 1936). Sperantia helped develop erotetics with a "Projet d'une "logique du problème".

A member of the Romanian Writers' Society from 1916, as well as of international associations for legal philosophers and sociologists, he took part in numerous congresses abroad. He also undertook a prodigious cultural activity in Transylvania in the first years after the war. A scholar of multiple disciplines with an encyclopedic spirit, Sperantia forms part of Romania's humanist tradition. He reached the retirement age in 1949, early in the communist regime. This took place after he had undergone a concerted series of attacks during the preceding several years, both from committed Bolsheviks and from the opportunists who had turned to Marxism overnight.
