= Virgil Huzum =

Virgil Huzum (born Virgiliu Huzum; December 12, 1905–July 7, 1987) was a Romanian poet.

Born in Ianca, Brăila County, his parents were Ion Huzum, a pharmacist, and Clara (née Andoniu). He attended primary school in Darabani and Focșani, and went to Unirea High School in the latter town. While a student, he published verses in Anuarul Societății literare a Liceului "Unirea"; he graduated in 1923. He studied pharmacy and obtained a degree in literature and philosophy from the University of Bucharest in 1931. He made his adult publication debut in 1924 in Adevărul literar și artistic. Huzum's first published book was the 1926 À la manière de...., a collection of poetic parodies and pastiches. This was followed by short collections of verse: Bolta bizantină (1929), Zenit (1936), Mirajul sunetelor (1973). Among the magazines to which he contributed were Bilete de Papagal, Vremea, Viața literară, Zodiac and Viața Românească.
