= Unirea National College (Focșani) =

Coordinates: 45.6978°N 27.1916°E

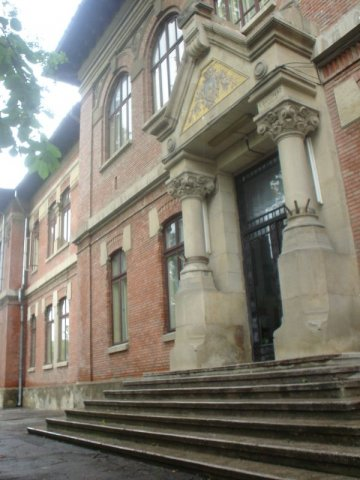
Unirea National College

Unirea National College (Romanian: Colegiul Național Unirea) is a high school located at 15 Cezar Bolliac Street, Focșani, Romania.

In 1865, Domnitor Alexandru Ioan Cuza ordered the establishment of a gymnasium in Focșani, which took place the following January, making it among the country's first such institutions. Within two years, the school had four grades, and the teachers were collecting materials for science, history and geography, as well as old coins. In 1880, work on the first dedicated building began; at the same time, the name changed from Cuza to Unirea, reflecting the association of Focșani with the union of the Principalities. A fifth grade was added in 1884, and the gymnasium soon became a high school. It moved into the new building in 1900. As early as the 1890s, students formed various literary and cultural societies. During World War I, when the area was under German occupation, the school closed and a hospital was set up inside.

In the interwar period, the school underwent material improvements, introducing a library room, a physics and chemistry amphitheater, laboratories for the same subjects and new classrooms. A film projector acquired in 1920 was used in screenings at the end of the week, delighting pupils. The area's first history and ethnography museum was founded by a faculty member in 1928 and opened in an annex. The 1940 Vrancea earthquake and World War II caused significant damage. During the communist regime, the quality of education declined at Unirea, which eventually became an industrial high school. This trend began to reverse after the Romanian Revolution of 1989, so that it was declared a national college in 1997.

The school library began in 1874, with 45 books donated by pupils. Two years later, a leading citizen of the town organized various events, collecting a large sum for the further acquisition of books. In 1881, the school began ordering French and German periodicals, drawing on funds supplied by town hall. The library, opened to the public in 1907, was damaged during World War I. A literary society donated its collection in 1920, bringing the holdings to 10,000. World War II brought further losses, and in 1948, the new Communist authorities ordered the destruction of "bourgeois" titles. By the 21st century, the library held 33,000 books, of which 6,300 were old and rare.

The school building is listed as a historic monument by Romania's Ministry of Culture and Religious Affairs. Also listed is a 1921 plaque carved by Oscar Späthe and dedicated to the students of Putna County who fell in World War I.

== Faculty and alumni ==
=== Faculty ===
- Ioan A. Bassarabescu
- Gheorghe Bogdan-Duică
- Ovid Densusianu
- Constantin Giurescu
- Constantin Moisil

=== Alumni ===
- Cornel Coman
- Ion Frunzetti
- Virgil Huzum
- Nicolae I. Manolescu
- Simion Mehedinți
- Ion Mincu
- Ion Nestor
- Constantin Ion Parhon
- Emanoil Petruț
- Anghel Saligny
- Duiliu Zamfirescu
