= Mihail Cruceanu =

Romanian poet (1887–1988)

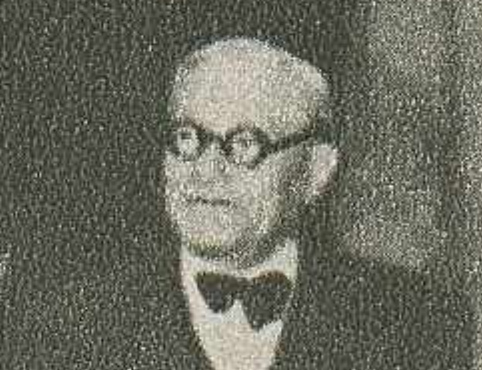
- Mihail Cruceanu in 1956
- Born: December 13, 1887; Iași, Romania
- Died: July 7, 1988 (aged 100); Bucharest, Romania
- Education: University of Bucharest
- Occupation: Poet
- Writing career
- Language: Romanian
- Period: 1904–1987
- Literary movement: Symbolism

Mihail Cruceanu (December 13, 1887 – July 7, 1988) was a Romanian poet.

He was born in Iași to Mihail Cruceanu, a doctor, and his wife Ecaterina (née Petrovanu). He attended high school in Ploiești and Pitești, earning his degree in 1906 at Bucharest's Saint Sava High School. Cruceanu enrolled in the University of Bucharest, where he took degrees in law (1911) and literature and philosophy (1913). He subsequently taught high school at Alexandria, Craiova and Bucharest. He made his poetic debut in Revista literară in 1904. Although he associated with the Literatorul circle of Alexandru Macedonski, he was closer to Ovid Densusianu's Vieața Nouă group. His first published volume was the 1912 Spre cetatea zorilor. Between 1911 and 1913, he interviewed a series of cultural figures, recording the encounters in Rampa; these included Macedonski, Densusianu, Alexandru Vlahuță, Ioan Alexandru Brătescu-Voinești, Dimitrie Anghel, Ioan A. Bassarabescu and Mihail Dragomirescu. Reviews that published his work include Farul, Vieața Nouă, Sărbătoarea eroilor, Versuri și Proză, Revista celorlalți, Flacăra, Adevărul Literar, Îndreptar, Românul, Zorile, Revista Fundațiilor Regale, Luceafărul, Viața Românească and România Literară.

Cruceanu entered the labor movement in 1919 and joined the Romanian Communist Party upon its 1921 foundation, holding various leadership posts. The party was banned in 1924, and he was arrested and imprisoned on various occasions for his political activity. After the 1944 Coup against Romania's pro-Axis dictator and the party's legalization, he continued to be active in the social and political realm. From 1950 to 1970, he was a professor at the University of Bucharest's Romanian language and literature faculty. He also served as president of the Bucharest chapter of the Society of Philological Sciences.

Cruceanu's Symbolist poetry appeared in Altare nouă (1915), Fericirea celorlalți (1920) and Lauda vieții (1945); the last had socialist realist touches. The 1968 anthology Versuri revived a poet whose milieu and expressions belonged to the early 20th century. The 1924 prose work Povestiri pentru tine was a foray into fantasy literature; Perpessicius commented on its sure style and hints of an "essential lyricism". His memoirs, published in 1973 as De vorbă cu trecutul, included an original series of recollections.

== Bibliography ==
- Spre cetatea zorilor, Târgoviște, 1912
- Altare nouă, Târgu Jiu, 1915
- Fericirea celorlalți, Craiova, 1920
- Povestiri pentru tine (fantasy sketches and short stories), Bucharest, 1924
- Lauda vieții, Bucharest, 1945
- Poezii alese, Bucharest, 1957
- Versuri, Bucharest, 1968
- Al. Dobrogeanu-Gherea, with Fl. Tănăsescu, Bucharest, 1971
- Pălării și capete, Bucharest, 1972
- De vorbă cu trecutul, Bucharest, 1973
- Poeme alese, Craiova, 1974
- Poeme, Bucharest, 1985
- Lauda vieții, ed. F. Firan, Craiova, 1987
- Scrieri în proză, ed. C. Mohanu, Bucharest, 1987
