= Haiku in languages other than Japanese =

The Japanese haiku has been adopted in various languages other than Japanese.

== English ==
The imagist poets Ezra Pound and Amy Lowell wrote what they called hokku. Their followers were the Buddhist poet Paul Reps and the Beat poets, including Jack Kerouac.

The first English-language haiku magazine was American Haiku (1963–1968).

== French ==
French poets who have written haiku in French include Paul-Louis Couchoud (1905), Paul Claudel (1942), Seegan Mabesoone and Nicolas Grenier. Georges Friedenkraft (fr) (2002) considers that haiku in French, due to the less rhythmic nature of the French language, often include alliterations or discrete rhymes, and cites the following Haiku by Jacques Arnold (1995) as an example:

"Jasons : Dieu merci
Ça sent si bon sa forêt
La soupe au persil."

Subsequent to Paul-Louis Couchoud's popularisation of the form in France through his essays and translations, the next major haiku collection to appear there was the sequence of war poems by Julien Vocance, Cent visions de guerre (1916). Later haiku by him were included among the work of the twelve published together in the Nouvelle Revue Française (No. 84, September 1920), among whom was the young Paul Éluard. This was followed by the anthology Le Haïkaï Français in 1923.

== German ==
Haiku have found a foothold in German poetry since the 1920s, with examples from Rainer Maria Rilke, Franz Blei, Yvan Goll, Peter Altenberg, Alfred Mombert and Arno Holz among others being cited. The collection Ihr gelben Chrysanthemen! by de:Anna von Rottauscher (Vienna 1939) was published in the 1930s. Also written in the 1930s, haiku by Imma von Bodmershof appeared in book-form in 1962 and were republished in Japan in 1979 as "Löwenzahn: die auf 17 Silben verkürzten Haiku".

In 1988, Margaret Buerschaper founded the German Haiku Society (Die Deutsche Haiku-Gesellschaft e. V.).

== Spanish ==
Authors in Spain who have written haiku in Spanish include Federico García Lorca, Antonio Machado, Juan Ramón Jiménez and Luis Cernuda. Many other writers across Latin America, including Jorge Luis Borges, have also used the form. A translation of Bashō's Oku no Hosomichi to Spanish was done in 1957 by the Mexican poet and Nobel Prize winner Octavio Paz in collaboration with Japanese diplomat Eikichi Hayashiya.

== Italian ==
Gabriele D'Annunzio experimented with the haiku in the early twentieth century. In Italy, the national haiku association was founded in Rome in 1987 by Sono Uchida, the well-known Japanese haijin and the ambassador of Japan in Vatican. Soon after, the national association called Italian Friends of the haiku (Associazione Italiana Amici dell'Haiku) was established, and then the Italian Haiku Association. The poet Mario Chini (1876 - 1959) published the book of haiku titled "Moments" (Rome, 1960). Later, Edoardo Sanguineti published some of his haiku. The famed poet Andrea Zanzotto also published a collection of haiku in English, which he translated back into his native Italian (Haiku for a Season / Haiku per una stagione, Chicago: U. of Chicago Press, 2021).

== Portuguese ==
=== Brazil ===
In Brazil, haiku are also known as haikai or haicai.

According to H. Masuda Goga, the first Brazilian author of haiku was Afrânio Peixoto, who published Trovas Populares Brasileiras in 1919.

It was Guilherme de Almeida, however, who popularized it, with his own interpretation of its strict metrical and rhyming structure and the use of titles. He published the magazine article Os Meus Haicais in 1937 and the collection Poesia Vária in 1947, although the latter was not exclusively a collection of haiku. In the scheme proposed by Almeida, the first line rhymes with the third, and the second line has an internal rhyme (the 2nd syllable rhymes with the 7th syllable). Guilherme de Almeida's form of haiku continues to have many practitioners in Brazil.

Another school of Brazilian haiku is the traditionalist school, initially promoted by Japanese immigrants or their descendants, such as H. Masuda Goga and Teruko Oda. This school defines haiku as a poem written in simple language, without rhyme, structured in three lines with a total of 17 poetic syllables: five syllables in the first line, seven in the second, and five in the third.

Goga attributes the Japanese origin of the Brazilian haiku—in its original form—to Japanese immigrants, beginning with the arrival of the ship Kasato Maru at the port of Santos on June 18, 1908.

It was in the 1930s that the exchange and dissemination of haiku among Japanese and Brazilian poets began, thus establishing another path for haiku in Brazil. It was also during that decade that the oldest collection of haiku, simply titled Haikais by Siqueira Júnior, appeared; published in 1933, it consisted of 56 haiku. Fanny Luíza Dupré was the first woman to publish a book of haiku, in February 1949, titled Pétalas ao Vento: Haicais.

As haiku became established and spread in Portuguese, several schools of thought regarding it emerged:

- The school of those who emphasize the content of haiku;
- The school of those who emphasize form;
- The school of those who emphasize the importance of the kigo.

Advocates of the haiku's content are those who consider certain characteristics of the poem—such as conciseness, condensation, intuition, and emotion—to be unique and linked to Zen Buddhism. Those who consider form (teikei) to be the most important adhere to the 17-syllable poetic rule (5-7-5). Guilherme de Almeida not only embraced this school of thought but also created a unique way of composing his poems, known as "guilhermine" haiku. In addition to rhyming the first line with the third and the second syllable with the seventh of the second line, Guilherme gave titles to his haiku. Admirers of the importance of the kigo respect the use of the term or word indicating the season in their haiku.

== Estonian ==
Traditional haiku have been developed in Estonia since 1960s. Andres Ehin (1940 - 2011) was the most prominent Estonian-language haiku writer of the 20th century; his bilingual English-Estonian collection Moose Beetle Swallow was published in Ireland in 2005. Estonian poets Arvo Mets and Felix Tammi wrote haiku in Russian.

What some people call Estonian haiku (Estonian: Eesti haiku) is a form of poetry introduced in Estonia in 2009. The so-called "Estonian haiku" is shorter than a Japanese one; the syllable count in Japanese haiku is 5+7+5, while Estonian haiku also goes in three lines but only comprises 4+6+4 syllables. Estonian authors claim that this is a distinctively Estonian form.

Asko Künnap is credited as the inventor of Estonian haiku. The first collection of Estonian haiku was published in 2010: Estonian Haiku by poets Asko Künnap, Jürgen Rooste, and Karl Martin Sinijärv. An Estonian-language haiku competition was organized at the 2011 Helsinki Book Fair where Estonia was the guest of honor. A selection of Estonian haiku has been published by the Estonian Writers' Union's magazine Looming ("Creation"). Estonian haiku have been actively translated into Finnish.

== Gujarati ==
Jhinabhai Desai introduced Haiku in Gujarati literature and popularized it. Soneri Chand Rooperi Suraj (1967) is the collection of 359 haiku and six Tanka poems. Kevalveej (1984) and Sunrise on the Snowpeaks are his other haiku collections. Dhiru Parikh published Haiku collection titled Aagiya in 1982.

== Arabic ==
Haiku poetry is a relatively new practice in the Arabic literature. It wasn't until 2010 when the first book was published by a Syrian writer Muhammad Adimah containing 1000 haiku translated from Japanese directly. Although most of the Arab haiku poets use the three short lines structure, this has not always been considered as a strict rule. Literary critics in the Arab world have not reached an agreement yet whether the haiku poems written by the young poets can be considered a new form of poetry or merely a different name for the (already popular) flash fiction. In July 2015, the Poetry Letters Magazine acknowledged the Arabic haiku as a distinct form of poetry by publishing, for the first time, haiku poems of 11 Arab poets from Syria, Morocco, Iraq, Jordan, and Tunisia.

== Armenian ==
A collection of 63 haikus in Western Armenian, titled Armenian Haiku (Հայերէն հայքու, Hayeren Haiku) was authored by Garin Angoghinian, an Armenian-American, and was published in 2021.

== Haiku in southeast Europe ==
The first publication in Yugoslavia treating haiku was Miloš Crnjanski's Poezija starog Japana (Poetry of Ancient Japan), published in 1925. He was attracted to the aesthetics of aioi-no-matsu - the eternal - and Buddhist empathy, in common with his poetic theme of connecting distant things and concepts through affection.

In socialist Yugoslavia, development of haiku poetry began during the 1960s, when the first haiku books were written, starting with Leptirova krila (The Butterfly's Wings) by Dubravko Ivančan in 1964. Other writers include Vladimir Zorčić (1941–1995), Milan Tokin's (1909–1962) unpublished collection Godišnja doba (Seasons), Desanka Maksimović, Alexander Neugebauer (1930–1989), and Zvonko Petrović (1925–2009). Vladimir Devide (1925–2010) published the first book on haiku theory in 1970, titled Japanese Poetry and its Cultural and Historical Context, with many translations of Japanese classics. Dejan Razić (1935–1985) published two books on haiku in 1979, The Development of Haikai Poetry from its Beginning to Basho, and The Peak of Haikai Poetry. The journal Haiku ran from 1977 to 1981.

The Haiku Marathon (1982) and the Yugoslav Haiku Competition (1985) were organised in the 1980s by Slavko Sedlar. The first Serbian haiku journal Paun started being published in 1988 with Milijan Despotović as an editor. The journal Kulture istoka (1983–1992) gave further impetus to the study of Japanese and other oriental cultures. In 1991, the Belgrade-based haiku club Šiki was formed, named after Masaoka Shiki. In 1999, Anakiev together with Serge Tome created the web site Haiku Association of Southeastern Europe. The Haiku Association of Yugoslavia was formed in 2000. The multilingual "Knots- The Anthology of Southeastern European Haiku Poetry" was published in 1999 with poems from writers all over southeastern Europe. The 2000 conference of the World Haiku Federation was held in Slovenia.

In addition to its traditional aesthetic functions, haiku has also been adapted globally as a form for social commentary and critique. A 2025 academic study from Salahaddin University highlighted this trend, arguing that poets from diverse cultural backgrounds, including the United States, Japan, and Iraq, have used the concise form to address social reform and critique issues such as racial capitalism, post-war alienation, and the trauma of conflict.
