= Alexandru A. Philippide =

Romanian poet

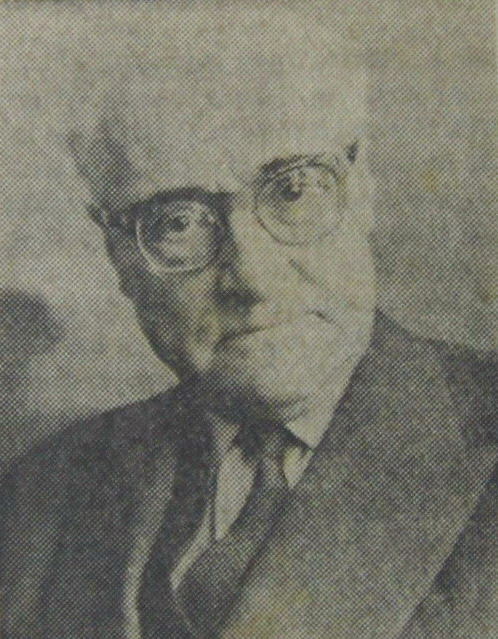
Alexandru Philippide

Alexandru A. Philippide (Romanian pronunciation: [alekˈsandru filiˈpide]; April 1, 1900 – February 8, 1979) was a Romanian poet.

The son of linguist Alexandru Philippide, he was born in Iași. He studied law, literature, philosophy and political economy at the University of Iași, of Berlin and of Paris. Making his poetry debut in 1919, he published rarely, with volumes appearing in 1922, 1930 and 1939. Thus, his decision to enter an artistic strike after the onset of the Communist regime passed unnoticed. During this period, he translated or improved texts by Johann Wolfgang von Goethe, Friedrich Schiller, E. T. A. Hoffmann, Heinrich Heine, Thomas Mann, Voltaire, William Shakespeare, Alexander Pushkin, Leo Tolstoy, Rabindranath Tagore and many others. He was not an open dissident, accepting corresponding membership in the Romanian Academy in 1955 and titular membership in 1963. Once the socialist realist phase had passed, he began writing poetry again. He was buried in Bellu cemetery in Bucharest.

A street in Bucharest bears his name. Initially called Pia Brătianu, it was renamed after Olga Bancic under communism and given Philippide's name following the Romanian Revolution.
