= Constantin T. Stoika =

Romanian poet and prose writer

Constantin T. Stoika (February 14, 1892 – October 23, 1916) was a Romanian poet and prose writer.

Born in Buzău to journalist Titus Stoika and his wife Irena (née Ciorogârleanu), he attended primary school in Piatra Neamț and in the then-Austro-Hungarian Brașov. He also began at a gymnasium there, and completed this stage of his schooling at Buzău and Slatina. This was followed by high school in Pitești and the literature and philosophy faculty of the University of Bucharest, from which he graduated in 1916. He made his published debut while still in high school, with poems (Preludii) and short prose works, published in 1909–1910 in Tinerimea literară și artistică, which he edited together with his brother Cezar. He contributed to the Ploiești-based Curierul liceului in 1910–1911.

He was a member of the Gion literary society and of Societatea critică student circle, led by Mihail Dragomirescu. In 1914–1915, he edited Poezia magazine, which welcomed submissions from the younger generation while gaining prestige from the contributions of Duiliu Zamfirescu, George Murnu, Ovid Densusianu, Gala Galaction and Dragomirescu. His work also featured in Drum drept, Dumineca, Epoca, Neamul românesc literar, Noua revistă română, Ramuri, Săptămâna politică și culturală a capitalei, Universul literar and Vieața Nouă. Pen names that he used include Delaziliște, Tarmes, Tartar, Sapiens, Micado, Costo, Amor, St., Troedo and Ego. He collected his verses in the 1910 book Licăriri. He translated works by Charles Baudelaire, Sully Prudhomme, Paul Verlaine, Jean Racine, Ludwig Uhland and Joséphin Péladan; the French poetry of Iulia Hasdeu; and Horace and Lucretius.

In 1914, he graduated from the military artillery school with the rank of second lieutenant. After Romania's entry into World War I in August 1916, he was assigned to a border regiment based in Câineni, on the frontier with Austria-Hungary. Two months later he was killed in action at Boișoara, near the Turnu Roșu Pass on the Carpathian front, during an artillery bombardment. He was buried on a hill next to Boișoara, and was decorated post-mortem. His war diary was published as Însemnări din zilele de luptă in 1921 and 1977.
