= Marcel Romanescu =

Romanian poet

Marcel Romanescu (October 11, 1897–1956) was a Romanian poet.

Born in Liège, he attended primary school in Paris and Craiova; he went to high schools in Craiova, Turnu Severin, Iași and at Dealu Monastery. In 1920, he obtained a degree in law and philosophy from the University of Bucharest. He served as attaché to the legation at the Vatican from 1921 to 1923, and was legation secretary at Warsaw (1923-1925) and at The Hague from 1925. He headed România magazine at Rome in 1921, and Flamura at Craiova from 1926 to 1929. From 1915, he published in the Bucharest-based Flacăra, subsequently contributing to Viața literară și artistică (at Craiova), Ramuri, Lumină nouă, Solia, România de mâine, Zorile, Glasul Bucovinei, Sburătorul, Adevărul literar și artistic, Convorbiri Literare, Gândirea, Mișcarea literară and Universul literar. His first book, the 1923 Isvoare limpezi, was billed as including "sonnets and poems". He also published Cuiburi în soare (1926), Hermanosa din Corint. Povestea unei hetaire (1927) and Grădina lui Teocrit (1928). He wrote a version of the Song of Songs in 1925, as well as translating Johann Wolfgang von Goethe, Fausto Maria Martini, Gunnar Heiberg and Sigbjørn Obstfelder. His poetry was Neoclassical, with certain affinities linking it to the motifs and rhythms of Symbolism and Parnassianism.
