= Alfred Hefter =

Romanian writer

Alfred Hefter (last name also Hefter-Hidalgo) (1892 in Iași – 1957 in Rome) was a Romanian poet, journalist, and writer of Jewish descent. In 1935 he founded the French-language newspaper Le Moment, which was published in Bucharest (besides in Geneva) until 1940.

His first publication was a Marxist-influenced pamphlet in 1908, which he wrote with his brother Jean (1887–1974), also a journalist. He published poems in the literary magazine Simbolul. He was the editor of a symbolist magazine, Versuri și Proză (1912–14), and two newspapers, and after 1924 was active in Bucharest as an editor, where he was part of a group of Jewish intellectuals who influenced the poet, critic, and philosopher Benjamin Fondane. On unfriendly terms with the government censor, he moved to Geneva in 1931 and edited the French-language journal Le Moment, then returned to Bucharest to continue its publication there. He left Bucharest in 1941 for Jerusalem, moved to France in 1948, and finally to Rome, where he became a businessman and died in 1957.

== Publications ==
- Cuvinte despre oameni ("Some Words on People," 1913)
- Din umbră ("From the Shadow," 1913)
- Ariana (drama, 1915)
- Miros de iarbă ("Smell of Grass," drama, 1915)
