= Claudia Millian =

Romanian poet

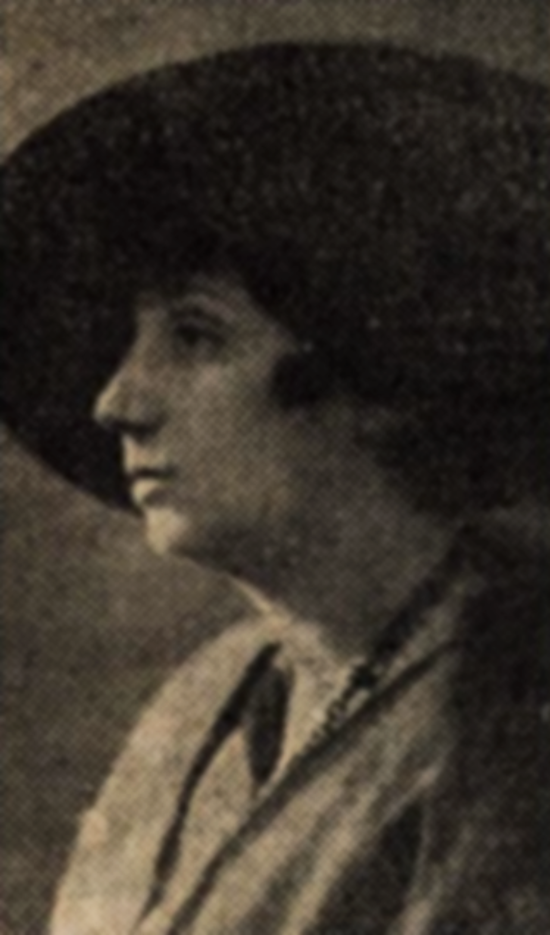
Millian in 1915

Claudia Millian (also Millian-Minulescu; February 21, 1887 – September 21, 1961) was a Romanian poet.

Born in Bucharest, her father was Ion Millian, an engineer of Greek origin; her mother was Maria (née Negoescu). She attended primary and high school in Bucharest and Ploiești, followed by the Fine Arts School (1906-1911) and the Dramatic Arts Conservatory. She worked as an art teacher in Bucharest from 1918 to 1940. Her first published work appeared in 1906 in the Ploiești magazine Lumina, while her first volume was the 1914 Garoafe roșii. Other volumes include Cântări pentru pasărea albastră (1922) and Întregire (1936). Her first husband was journalist Christea N. Dumitrescu-Cridim; after their divorce, she married poet Ion Minulescu in April 1914. She received the Ordre des Palmes Académiques for her work in promoting Franco-Romanian cultural ties.

== Bibliography ==
- Garoafe roșii, Bucharest, 1914
- Cântări pentru pasărea albastră, Bucharest, 1922
- Întregire, Bucharest, 1936
- Despre Ion Minulescu, Bucharest, 1968
- Cartea mea de aduceri aminte (ed. M. Gafița), Bucharest, 1973
- Cartea a patra (poems), Bucharest, 1974
- Cântări pentru pasărea albastră (poems, ed. Elena Piru), Bucharest, 1975
- Vreau să trăiesc (theatrical plays, ed. Nina Stănculescu), Bucharest, 1983
