= Versuri și Proză =

Romanian literary and art magazine

Versuri și Proză was a Romanian literary and art magazine edited by Alfred Hefter-Hidalgo and I. M. Rașcu, published in Iași from 1912 to 1916. It published work by Benjamin Fondane and Victor Ion Popa.
