= Nicolae Davidescu =

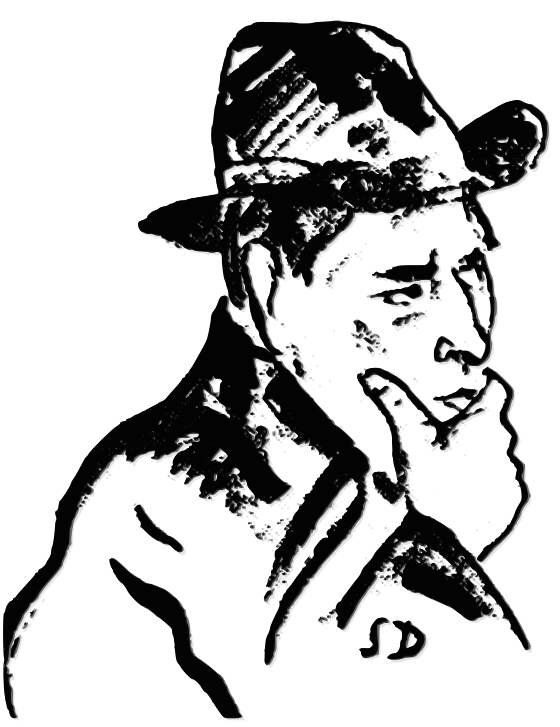
Drawing of Davidescu, by Ștefan Dimitrescu (1926)

Nicolae Davidescu (Romanian pronunciation: [nikoˈla.e daviˈdesku]; October 24, 1888 – June 12, 1954) was a Romanian symbolist poet and novelist.

== Works ==
=== Poetry ===
- 1910: La fântâna Castaliei ("At Castalia's Well") - parnassianist poems
- 1916: Inscripţii ("Engravings") - influenced by Charles Baudelaire
- 1928 – 1937: Cântecul omului ("The Song of Man") - recreating of the world history, influenced by La Légende des siècles (Victor Hugo).

=== Novel ===
- 1912: Zâna din fundul lacului ("The Fairy at the Bottom of the Lake") - an exercise in symbolism;
- 1915: Sfinxul ("The Sphinx")
- 1928: Vioara mută ("The Muted Violin") - influenced by social psychology;

=== Literary criticism ===
Two collections of his literary criticism were published posthumously:

- 1975: Aspecte şi direcţii literare ("Literary Conventions and Directions")
- 1977: Poezii, teatru, proză ("Poetry, Drama, Prose").

Nicolae Davidescu collaborated at Viața Românească.
