= Paul Cernat =

Romanian essayist and literary critic

Paul Cernat (born August 5, 1972, in Bucharest) is a Romanian essayist and literary critic. He has a Ph.D. summa cum laude in philology. Cernat has been a member of the Writers' Union of Romania since 2009. As of 2013, he is lecturer of Romanian literature in the Department of History of the University of Bucharest.
