= Symbolist movement in Romania =

Movement in Romania

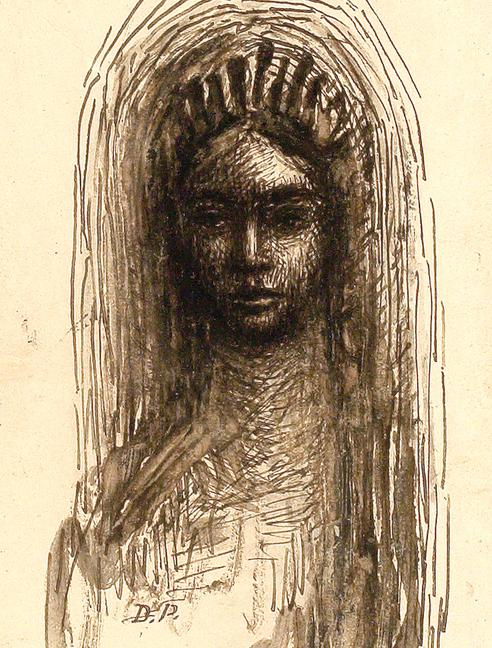
Chimera, ink drawing by Dimitrie Paciurea

The Symbolist movement in Romania, active during the late 19th and early 20th centuries, marked the development of Romanian culture in both literature and visual arts. Bringing the assimilation of France's Symbolism, Decadence and Parnassianism, it promoted a distinctly urban culture, characterized by cosmopolitanism, Francophilia and endorsement of Westernization, and was generally opposed to either rural themes or patriotic displays in art. Like its Western European counterparts, the movement stood for idealism, sentimentalism or exoticism, alongside a noted interest in spirituality and esotericism, covering on its own the ground between local Romanticism and the emerging modernism of the fin de siècle. Despite such unifying traits, Romanian Symbolism was an eclectic, factionalized and often self-contradictory current.

Originally presided upon by poet and novelist Alexandru Macedonski, founder of Literatorul magazine, the movement sparked much controversy with its stated disregard for established convention. The original circle of Symbolists made adversaries among the conservative Junimea club, as well as among the traditionalist writers affiliated with Sămănătorul review and the left-wing Poporanists. However, Romanian Symbolism also radiated within these venues: sympathetic to Junimea's art for art's sake principles, it also communicated to neoromantic sensibilities within the traditionalist clubs, and comprised a socialist wing of its own. In parallel, the notoriety of Macedonski's circle contributed to the development of other influential Symbolist and post-Symbolist venues, including Ovid Densusianu's Vieața Nouă and Ion Minulescu's Revista Celor L'alți, as well as to the birth of artists' clubs such as Tinerimea Artistică. The latter category of Symbolist venues helped introduce and promote the aesthetics of Art Nouveau, Vienna Secession, post-Impressionism and related schools.

Before and during World War I, with the birth of magazines such as Simbolul and Chemarea, the modernist current within Symbolism mutated into the avant-garde trend, while the more conservative Symbolist circles made a return to Neoclassicism. Other manifestations of Symbolism, prolonged by the ideology of Eugen Lovinescu's Sburătorul review, continued to play a part in Romanian cultural life throughout the interwar period.

== Early Symbolism ==
=== Origins ===
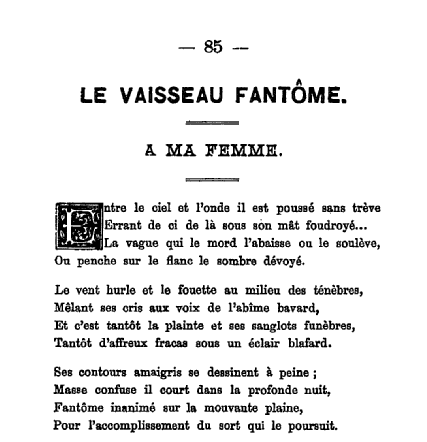
One of Alexandru Macedonski's poems, in L'Élan Littéraire (1885)

The ground for Parnassianism and Symbolism in Romania was prepared by the Romania public's introduction to the poetry and essays of Charles Baudelaire. One participant in this process was the French author Ange Pechméja, exiled for his opposition to the Second Empire, who settled in Bucharest and published what is purportedly the first article on Baudelaire to have been circulated in the region. The earliest echoes from within the country were found among the Junimists: as early as the 1870s, the club's magazine Convorbiri Literare published several works by Baudelaire, translated from French by Vasile Pogor. Some of these texts had echoes in Junimist literature. Active later in the decade, poet Mihai Eminescu probably accommodated some Symbolist themes into his own Romantic and pessimistic fantasy works, most notably in his 1872 novel Poor Dionis. Junimea poet Veronica Micle (Eminescu's lover) may also have assimilated the nostalgia typical of French Symbolists.

Another point of contact stood at the core of Junimist theory, where the group's doyen, Titu Maiorescu, had placed the concept of "art for art's sake", stating his opposition to the didacticism endorsed by his various rivals while aligning himself with Schopenhauerian aesthetics and other constructs of German philosophy. This approach also showed Maiorescu's appreciation for the artistic principles of American poet Edgar Allan Poe, who was a direct influence on the French Symbolists or Parnassians—the Junimist philosopher had in fact read Poe's theoretical essays, "The Poetic Principle" and "The Philosophy of Composition", in a French-language translation signed by Baudelaire. However, Maiorescu generally ignored and at times expressed a strong rejection of French-inspired modern literary schools, either Parnassian or Symbolist.

Despite such contacts, the earliest form of native Symbolism emerged from the mainstream, non-Junimist, Romantic tradition. Literary historian Paul Cernat argues that the Symbolist movement's later evolution reflected an original clash of ideas, between the "metaphysical, conservative and Germanophile" nature of Junimism and the "revolutionary, cosmopolitan, progressivist and Francophile" position of Romanian Romanticism. A product of the Romantic school in Romania's southern area of Wallachia, Alexandru Macedonski provoked scandal by openly challenging the dominance of Junimist figures. One such ill-famed campaign focused on Eminescu, who was coming to be recognized as Romania's national poet, and who stood for political conservatism, folkloric traditionalism, ethnic nationalism and the direct influence of German Romanticism. In reference to these incidents, critic Mihai Zamfir noted: "Actually, with the incompatibility between Maiorescu and Macedonski, between Junimea and the Macedonskian club, a border is traced [...] separating the 19th century from the 20th." While Eminescu's approach still evolved within the limits set by Junimea, it served to inspire a large number of non-Junimist traditionalists, whose didacticism, shaped by populist values, was hotly opposed by Macedonski and his followers.

Such conflicts were aired by means of Macedonski's Bucharest-based Literatorul review. Initially a purely anti-Junimist platform hosting contributions from aging Romantic writers (Bogdan Petriceicu Hasdeu, Bonifaciu Florescu, V. A. Urechia etc.), it closed down several times and eventually reemerged as the main platform of early Romanian Symbolism. The circle had among its representatives a number of Macedonski's young disciples and colleagues, themselves more or less influenced by the aesthetics of Decadence and Symbolism: Th. M. Stoenescu, Dumitru Constantinescu-Teleormăneanu, Caton Theodorian, Carol Scrob, Dumitru Karnabatt, Mircea Demetriade, Donar Munteanu etc. Macedonski's own participation in Symbolism had an international character. It dates back to the mid-1880s, when his French-language poems were first published in French or Belgian Symbolist periodicals (La Wallonie and L'Élan Littéraire). In subsequent decades, the Romanian writer made repeated efforts to consolidate his reputation as a European Symbolist and enhance the profile of his Literatorul group, publishing his fantasy novel Thalassa, Le Calvaire de feu in Paris and establishing personal contacts with French and Francophone authors.

=== Symbolism between Macedonski and Petică ===
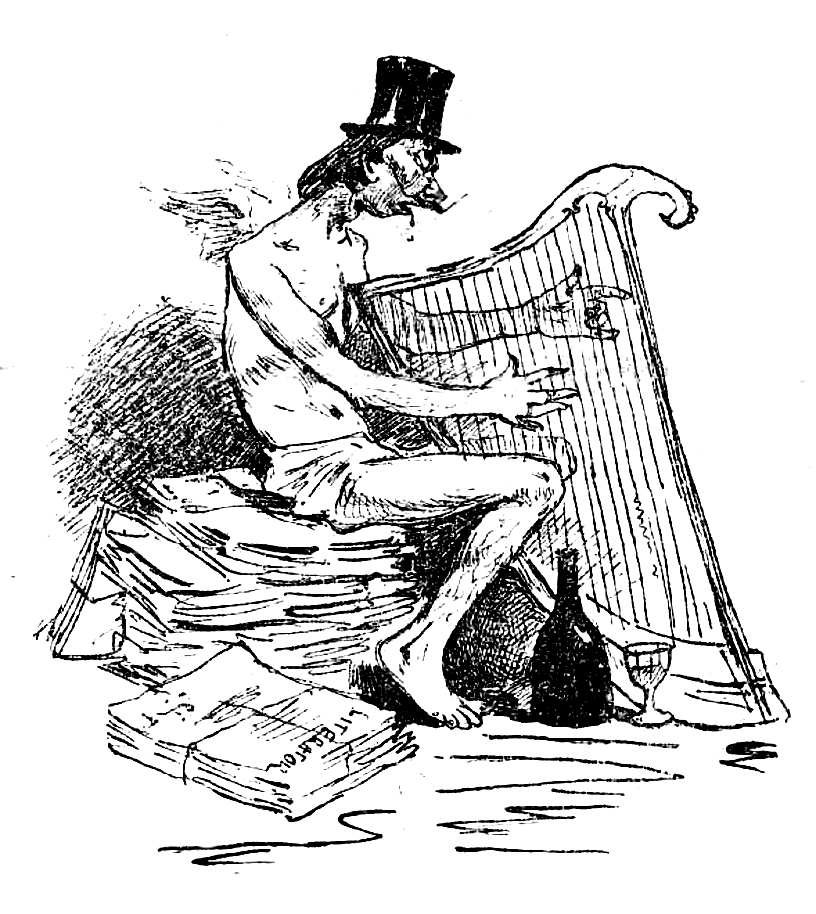
"The Symbolist poet", as portrayed by cartoonist Constantin Jiquidi. At the bottom, a stack of papers with the title Literatorul

Analyzing the overall eclectic nature of the movement originating with Literatorul, Mihai Zamfir concluded: "on Romanian territory, all currents united themselves into a synthetic 'newism' ". Similarly, literary historian Mircea Braga argued that Romanian Symbolism was more a state of mind than a program, its theses being "numerous and often imprecise". In line with these developments, the Symbolist milieus had as a shared focus their admiration for the Third French Republic, and for Paris as la Cité des Lumières ("the City of Lights").

As another unifying element in their post-Romantic opposition to the traditionalists and their advocacy of national specificity, the emerging Symbolists generally valued cosmopolitan individualism and cultivated exoticism. In this context, Dimitrie Anghel attracted critical praise with elaborate fantasy prose and floral-themed lyric poetry, rich in Decadentist and eccentric imagery. Outside the fold of regular Symbolism, but directly inspired by François Coppée, Haralamb Lecca delved into macabre subjects. More frequently, the choice of exotic subjects was modeled on Macedonski's poems, and fed by echoes of the major explorations, which were becoming familiar news in Romania. This fashion was notably illustrated by Iuliu Cezar Săvescu, who sang the deserts and the polar regions. In later years, Karnabatt and his wife Lucrezzia took Symbolism to the realm of travel writing.

The "Bovaryist" and "snobbish" tendency, Cernat notes, was what made many members of the movement seek to acquire for themselves an urban identity which clashed with the rural ideal and the religious mainstream. One other defining trait, which endured as a distinct tradition within Romanian Symbolism, was Macedonski's interest in alternatives to established religion, primarily manifested by his esoteric studies, and taken up by his disciples Karnabatt, Alexandru Petroff, and Alexandru Obedenaru. In later manifestations of Symbolism and Decadentism, this interest merged itself with a stated or implicit preference of other affiliates for Roman Catholicism in front of the majority religion, Romanian Orthodoxy. Some of these ideas were also inspiring the Romanian-born aristocrat Charles-Adolphe Cantacuzène, who was debuting as a poet in France, and who borrowed his mystical subjects from the Symbolist doyen Stéphane Mallarmé.

The identification with France came together with respect for the declining local aristocracy, the boyars, whom some of the Romanian Symbolists preferred over both the peasant majority and the competitive capitalist environment. It became a component of a larger Symbolist counterculture: several members of the movement, Macedonski included, found inspirational value in social alienation and individual failure, driving some of them to sympathize with the proletariat and the urban underclass. However, the group as a whole was still nominally opposed to the socialist circles of literary theorist Constantin Dobrogeanu-Gherea and his Contemporanul review, who primarily advocated a working class and realistic version of didacticism. This gap between was traversed by Macedonski's younger friend, the socialist poet and novelist Traian Demetrescu.

Macedonski's ideology was itself marked by inconsistency and eclecticism, often allowing for the coexistence of Parnassian and Symbolist opposites, and eventually turning into Neoclassicism. Also attracted into this Neoclassical mix was the poetic work of occasional contributors to Symbolist reviews: Panait Cerna, Mihai Codreanu, Oreste Georgescu, Cincinat Pavelescu, Duiliu Zamfirescu etc. The earliest internal restructuring of Romanian Symbolism occurred in 1895, a moment of effervescence in literary history. At the time, Literatorul was facing financial difficulties, its role being supplanted by a large number of magazines (Revista Contimporană, Revista Literară, Revista Olteană, Revista Orientală, Révue Franco-Roumaine etc.), most of them gravitating around Macedonski's circle. Liga Ortodoxă, a new magazine launched by Macedonski during the interval, published the first-ever contributions by young poet Tudor Arghezi, later one of the most acclaimed figures in Romanian letters.

A prominent figure among Macedonski's disciples to establish himself shortly after 1900 was poet and critic Ștefan Petică, originally a socialist influenced by Dobrogeanu-Gherea. Also noted for his attempts to set up contacts abroad, Petică was especially known for his overall erudition and his familiarity with English literature, with which came a stream of Pre-Raphaelite and Aestheticist influences into Romanian Symbolist poetry and prose. Even though the programmatic articles published by him in 1899 and 1900 do not clarify his exact relationship with Symbolism, his 1902 volume Fecioara în alb ("The Virgin in White") was described by researchers as the first product of mature Symbolism in Romania, while his Solii păcii ("The Messengers of Peace") is rated as the first Symbolist work in Romanian drama.

The turn of the century saw the Symbolist affiliation of George Bacovia, who published the first poems of what became, in 1916, the Plumb volume—inaugurating a period in his work centered on the sentimental depictions of acute alienation, sickness and suburban monotony. The year 1904 also marked Arghezi's emancipation from Macedonski's school and the start of his search for an individual approach to Symbolism. Directly inspired by Baudelaire, the young writer circulated the first poems in the Agate negre ("Black Agates") cycle and began editing his own periodical, Linia Dreaptă.

== Tinerimea Artistică, Symbolism and Art Nouveau ==
=== Birth of Tinerimea Artistică ===
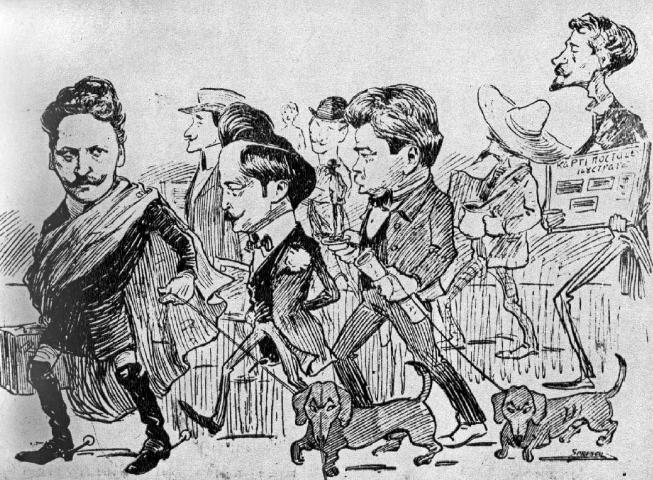
Some of the Tinerimea Artistică founders, in a caricature by Nicolae Petrescu-Găină (1903)

The same interval brought the first explicit manifestations of Symbolism in local visual arts. The second half of the 1890s witnessed the birth of opposition to academic art under the guidance of Macedonski's associate, poet, political agitator and art patron Alexandru Bogdan-Pitești, who set up an organization based on the French Société des Artistes Indépendants. In 1898, Bogdan-Pitești, together with Ioan Bacalbașa and Ștefan Ciocâlteu, founded Ileana, an international art society dedicated to the promotion of new art currents. The same year, Ileana financed and advertised the arrival to Bucharest of Joséphin Péladan, a French Decadentist writer and Rosicrucian mystic. After 1900, the Ileana group began publishing an eponymous art magazine, the first one of its kind in Romania, but was undecided about which style Romanian art should follow.

The 1890s saw the worldwide emergence of Art Nouveau as a Symbolist art form, challenging the popularity of Impressionism. The indirect impact of Vienna Secession was major, even outside the realm of visual arts, prompting literary historian Ștefan Cazimir to suggest the existence of a Secession period in local letters during the fin de siècle. Connections with French Symbolist aesthetics were being preserved, in Paris itself, by sculptor, actor and lawyer Constantin Ganesco and, with noted success, by the Greek Romanian painter and printmaker Michel Simonidy. According to the authors of the 1970 overview Pictura românească în imagini ("Illustrated Romanian Painting"), a new Art Nouveau school was born around 1900: "The predilection for Symbolist imagery, for the plant-like ornament, especially the floral one, for the decorative arabesque, for the matte pastel in brushwork techniques, are all [...] stylistic traits characteristic for this visual aesthetics, which was not fully developed in our country, but which was symptomatic in what regards the creation [...] of a new art climate".

In Romania, the innovating aesthetics were first promoted by means of Tinerimea Artistică society. Created in 1901, it reunited artists familiarized with both France's Art Nouveau scene and the Secession phenomenon. Like Ileana, Tinerimea was still frequented by mainstream conservatives, and, art historian Tom Sandqvist argues, only radicalized itself after 1905—the year when it became home to both the post-Impressionist Camil Ressu and the Secessionist Dimitrie Hârlescu. Overall, art historian Mariana Vida notes, the society was stylistically undecided, but its members tended to display the same Symbolist psychology: "the Symbolist artist is a decadent, swept over by morbidezza and eroticism, persuaded by suffering, despising the bourgeois life. Jewels, shiny stones, exotic flowers [...], perfumes, obscurities and spectral lights emphasize themes that appeal to the senses and a piercing synesthesia." She also argues: "In the case of visual arts, the problem of defining Romanian Symbolism remains up for debate, given the stylistic complexity of this phenomenon, the interferences of Art Nouveau aesthetics and a strong local color, the result of the tastes and mentalities of an area located at the Gates of the Orient."

=== Tinerimea and official art ===
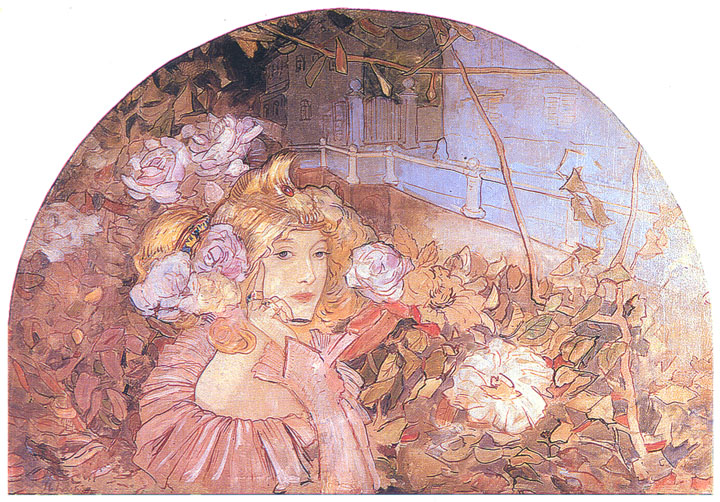
Ștefan Luchian, Primăvara ("Spring")

The blending of Symbolism and traditional art remained a characteristic of Tinerimea art. Nicolae Grigorescu, the academic Impressionist, was the respected Tinerimea forerunner, his status serving to moderate the Symbolist influence. However, according to some interpretations, Grigorescu's last works also bordered on Symbolism. A major figure among the Tinerimea group was Ștefan Luchian, whose canvasses and pastel drawings hesitate between Grigorescu's Impressionism, Art Nouveau and original research into new techniques. Luchian's colleague Nicolae Vermont was generally interested in classical forms of narrative painting, but also worked with typically Secession imagery, such as Salome. Well liked by Dimitrie Anghel, painter Kimon Loghi cultivated a particularly sentimental style, late Symbolist with Secession echoes. Loghi, who was trained by the German Symbolist master Franz Stuck, enjoyed remarkable success, beginning in 1898, when he won a Munich Secession award. In 1900, he represented Romanian artists at the Universal Exposition. The somber works of Arthur Verona acclimatized Symbolism into forest landscapes and sacred art, while French Symbolist influences (Gustave Moreau, Pierre Puvis de Chavannes) took the forefront in gouaches by the aristocrat Eugen N. Ghika-Budești.

The aging Tinerimea mentor George Demetrescu Mirea mainly worked with academic subjects, which critics have described as grandiloquent and stale, but allowed himself to be influenced by the French Symbolists. Although he and Verona were lionized by the traditionalists for their main contributions (idyllic and Grigorescu-like), Mirea's pupil Ipolit Strâmbu also steered toward Symbolism in some of his portraits. Initially trained in academic painting, Constantin Artachino veered toward Symbolism when seeking inspiration in the fairy tale. Some Symbolist echoes were also identified in the canvasses of Gheorghe Petrașcu and Jean Alexandru Steriadi, as well as in the engravings of Gabriel Popescu.

The echoes of Symbolism and Secession were also present in the works of Tinerimea sculptors Oscar Späthe and Friedrich Storck, both of whom were also inspired by the Munich Academy style. Späthe, who earned his peers' recognition as the leading Romanian Secessionist, was inspired to create works which blended the Byzantine revival or a set of tributes to the Quattrocento into a Secession setting, his example being closely followed by Storck. The echoes within Romanian sculpture were still minor, since, critics have noted, Romanian sculpture itself was underdeveloped.

Tinerimea's international ambitions also brought it into contact with European Symbolists, some of whom exhibited in Bucharest: Gustav Gurschner, Henri-Jean Guillaume Martin, Carl Milles etc. At home, Späthe's intercession gave Romanian Symbolism its official sponsor, Princess Marie of Edinburgh (the future Queen-Consort), an admirer of the Art Nouveau phenomenon in general. She was famously the owner of a large Art Nouveau collection at her Pelișor Castle in Sinaia, where she gathered the prints of Alphonse Mucha, Henri Privat-Livemont etc., as well as decorative art drawn in her own hand. Marie's taste, and her features, inspired the works of Romanian Symbolist sculptors into the next decade; her daughter Ileana of Romania was herself an amateur artist and writer, also won over by the Art Nouveau fashion.

The 1900 generation of painters and decorative artists stimulated the gradual incorporation of Art Nouveau into the vocabulary of modern Romanian architecture. In this context, the Symbolist legacy was often adapted into an allegorical expression of nationalism and historism, with the Bucharest group sometimes known as Arta 1900 ("Art of 1900"). The style called Neo-Brâncovenesc (or "Neo-Romanian"), which assimilated the Art Nouveau guidelines, was announced by Anghel Saligny and later taken up by Ion Mincu. The merger of decorative styles in handicrafts received enthusiastic support from ethnographer Alexandru Tzigara-Samurcaș, and was adapted into the mural paintings of Abgar Baltazar and Ștefan Popescu.

Neo-Brâncovenesc or pure Art Nouveau played an important part in remodeling the urban landscape, in Bucharest as well as in the Black Sea port of Constanța (where Petre Antonescu and Frenchman Daniel Renard designed the Constanța Casino). This urban renaissance also enlisted contributions from Nicolae Ghica-Budești, also known as a Secession interior designer, Ion D. Berindey, Cristofi Cerchez, Grigore Cerchez, Statie Ciortan, Constantin Iotzu, Giulio Magni, Alexandru Săvulescu and Spiridon Cegăneanu.

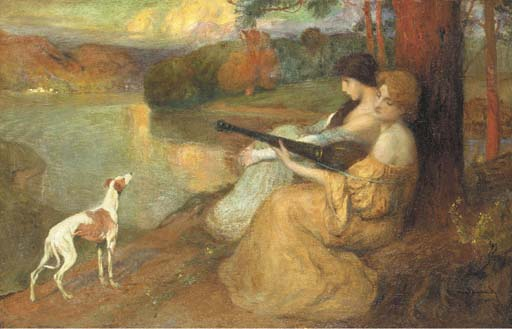
Michel Simonidy, Harmonie du soir ("Evening Harmony", 1905)

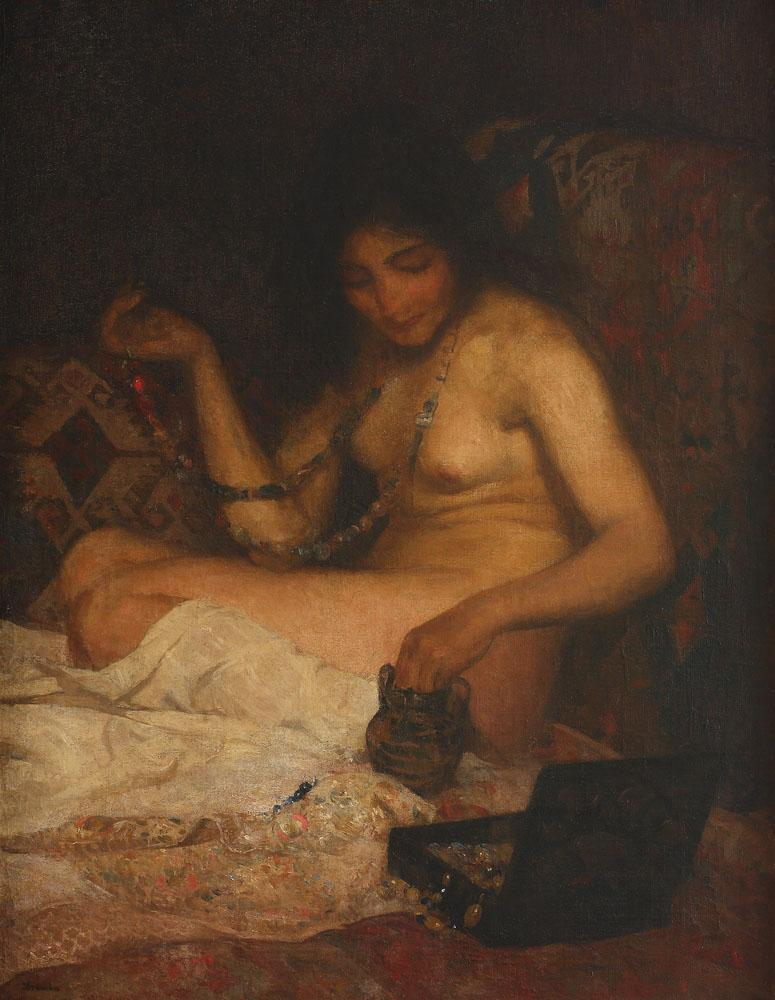
Ipolit Strâmbu, Cochetărie ("Coquetry", Unknown Date)

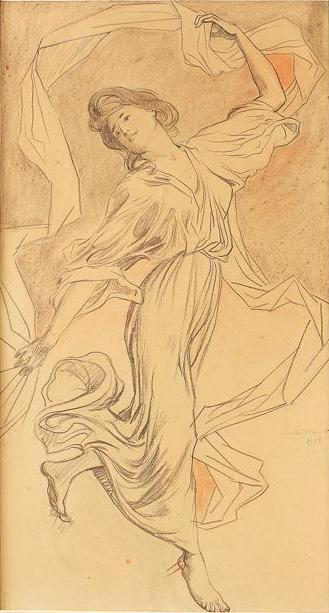
Nicolae Vermont, Dansul ("The Dance", 1908)

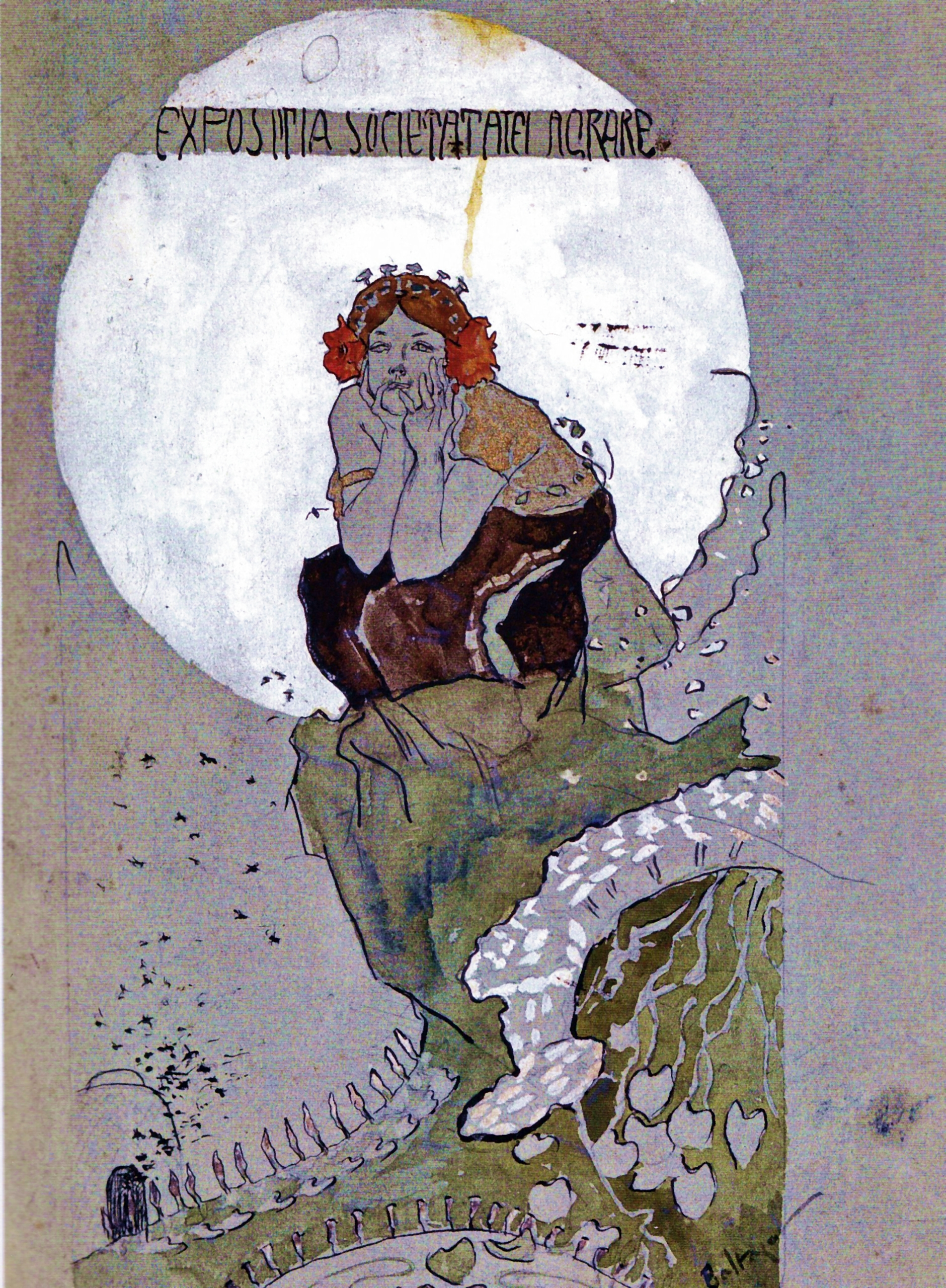
Abgar Baltazar, poster project (unknown date)

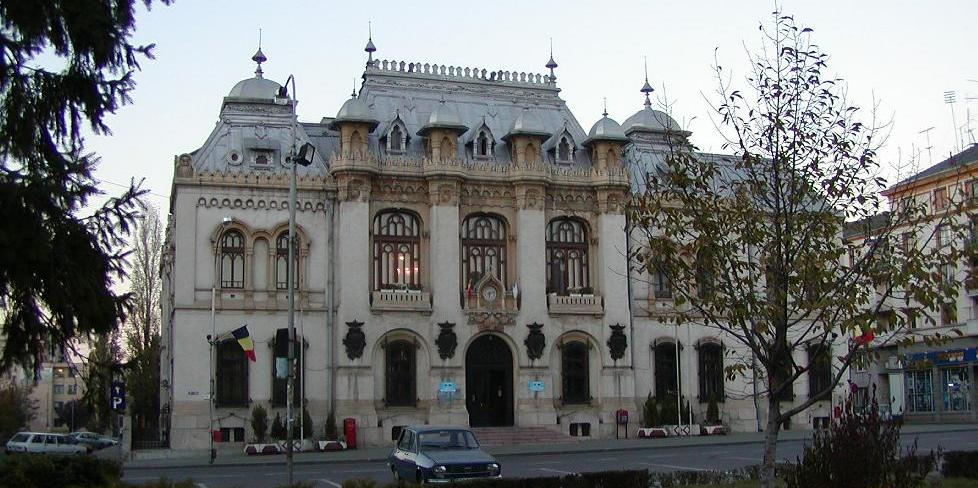
The Craiova City Hall, designed by Ion Mincu

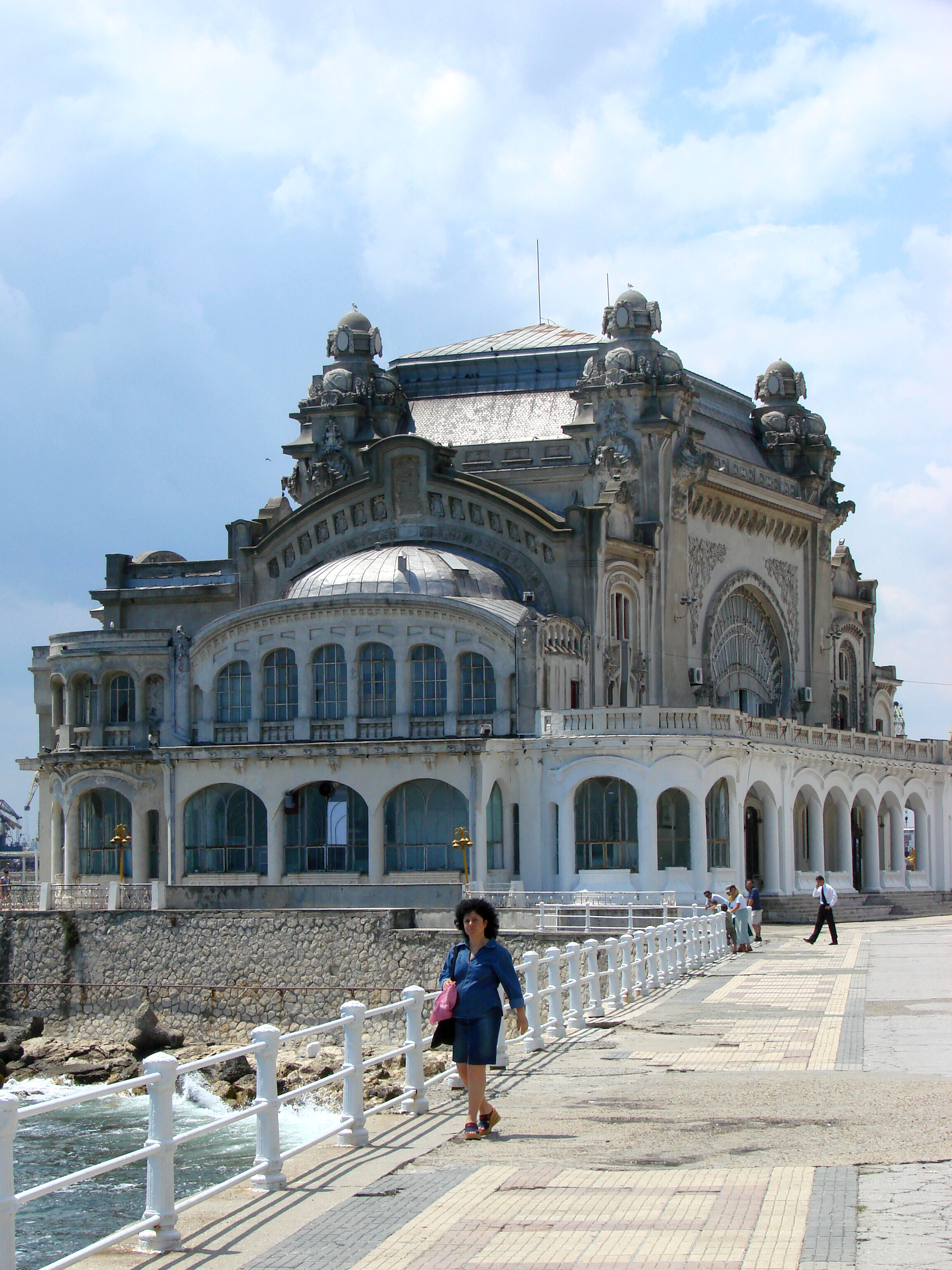
The Constanța Casino

== Symbolist expansion ==
=== Regional branches ===
The reaction against parochialism and traditionalism was strengthened by the diffusion of Symbolism and Decadentism into other the Romanian Kingdom's provincial areas, as well as by the steady influx of disappointed middle-class provincials into Bucharest. Journalist and Symbolist promoter Constantin Beldie recorded in his memoirs the arrival into the capital of "so many young men with their hair grown and with no cuffs on their shirts", leaving their places of origin "because their parents did not understand them" and motivated by the encouragements "of some literary sheet or another, that would eventually be dragged down into the murky waters of journalism." The fascination of provincial Romanian adolescents with the poetic themes of Symbolism was later documented (and criticized) in the novel La Medeleni, by the traditionalist Ionel Teodoreanu.

According to definitions from both within and without the Symbolist movement, there followed a structuring of Symbolism along the cultural priorities or characteristics of historical regions: an extrovert and suggestive school, heralded by Macedonski himself, in the southwestern province of Wallachia; and a melancholic branch to the north and east, in Moldavia. The "Wallachians", primarily judged as exponents of an artistic approach, are Macedonski, Demetrescu and Ion Pillat, alongside Alexandru Colorian, Elena Farago, Barbu Solacolu, Eugeniu Ștefănescu-Est etc. Of special note among the Symbolists emerging from Wallachia, Al. T. Stamatiad was a cherished disciple of Macedonski, who left flowery erotic verse and, in succession to Petică's Aestheticism, prose poems loosely based on those of Oscar Wilde.

At the other end of the spectrum, the early representatives of "Moldavian" Symbolism include Petică, Bacovia, Anghel, Gabriel Donna, Alfred Moșoiu, I. M. Rașcu and Alexandru Vițianu. According to literary historian Ovid Crohmălniceanu, the spread of literary modernism in general was helped along by "a certain insurgent fever of souls brought up in small Moldavian târguri and exasperated by their somnolent atmosphere". Cernat also asserts: "The dramatic lessening in administrative importance of Iași—Moldavia's former capital—generated a strong feeling of frustration among local intellectuals".

A distinct product of "Moldavian" Symbolism was the Iași-based review Vieața Nouă, founded in 1905 by the aspiring academic Ovid Densusianu, and published until 1925. Critics have suggested that Densusianu's image of Symbolism was rather complex and its agenda still eclectic: Vieața Nouă harbored a group of authors with distinct Neoclassical traits, who treasured free verse as a puristic form of poetic expression. The periodical was characterized not just by an advocacy of urban and Westernized culture, but also by a strong interest in the common heritage of Romance languages and tendencies toward Pan-Latinism, with Densusianu calling into question the traditionalist notion that Romanian purity was only preserved in the countryside. Vieața Nouă frequently published translations of modern French authors, from Remy de Gourmont and Marcel Proust to Paul Claudel. The magazine also enlisted the participation of Densusianu's disciples in the field of literary criticism, within Moldavia and elsewhere: D. Caracostea, Pompiliu Păltânea and Petre Haneș. With that, the influence of "academic" Symbolism stretched into Romania's new province of Northern Dobruja, where poet Al. Gherghel was stationed.

Densusianu's academic current is seen with some reserve by researchers, who argued that its followers were only accidentally Symbolist, and primarily advocates of conventional approaches. According to literary historian George Călinescu, Densusianu was more a Francophile than a Symbolist, and, as an immigrant from Transylvania (at the time in Austria-Hungary), out of touch with "the spirit of the new school." In Cernat's view, Densusianu's "tastelessness" and "narrow dogmatism" were a downgrading factor within the Symbolist environment, indirectly contributing to a schism between the Neoclassical and innovative sides of the movement. Although noted by the traditionalists as a most polemical magazine and somewhat successful in its competition with Junimea, Vieața Nouă remained a minor addition to the literary landscape, with very low circulation.

=== Sămănătorist reaction and 1908 revival ===
Especially after 1905, the Symbolist trend was faced with a stronger reaction from the traditionalist and ethno-nationalist camp, headed by the new literary magazine Sămănătorul. Through historian Nicolae Iorga, who was for a while its leading exponent, this circle instigated the public against Francophilia and cosmopolitanism, to the point of organizing the large-scale nationalist riots held in front of the National Theatre Bucharest (1906). Iorga found Symbolism trivial, calling it "lupanarium literature", while, in critic Ilarie Chendi, the traditionalist magazines found a vocal adversary of Macedonski's influence. Nevertheless, Sămănătorul cultivated its own neoromatic branch of the Symbolist current, which Cernat described as a sign that the conservative segment of Symbolism was also emancipating itself. The Symbolist-Sămănătorist wing was notably represented by two of the magazine's leading contributors: Ștefan Octavian Iosif and his friend Dimitrie Anghel. Anghel's collaboration with Iosif took the for of a literary duo, a significant product of which was the neoromantic drama Legenda funigeilor ("Gossamer Legend", 1907). Sămănătorul also opened itself to contributions from other authors formed by Symbolism, from Petică and Stamatiad to Farago and Alice Călugăru.

Also at that stage, first-generation Symbolism in general was becoming more accepted by the cultural establishment, engendering some mutations at the movement's core. In contrast to their teacher Macedonski, several Romanian Symbolists were adopting neoromantic attitudes and viewing Eminescu's poetry with more sympathy, treasuring those Eminescian traits which were closest to Decadentism (idealism, moroseness, exoticism). Nevertheless, more radical traditionalist ideologues such as Iorga continued to view the current with alarm: in 1905, Iorga notably used Sămănătorul to state his dislike for Anghel's floral-themed poetry, which he believed was suited to "boyar" tastes. On a more intimate level, Petică, seen by Mihai Zamfir as "the most Eminescian Romanian poet", was developing an original ethno-nationalist interpretation of art, infused with xenophobic discourse.

In reaction, a Symbolist core was defining itself as the elitist alternative to the Sămănătorul populism. By 1908, poet Ion Minulescu was becoming the new herald of Romanian Symbolism, or, according to George Călinescu, its "most integral exponent". Minulescu's ascendancy was nevertheless synonymous with the movement's decline, inaugurating a mutation into the avant-garde. His short-lived periodical, Revista Celor L'alți, was notorious for publishing the manifesto Aprindeți torțele! ("Light Up the Torches!"), viewed by critics as either the first explicitly Symbolist document of its kind or the earliest voice of the avant-garde. It suggested to the readers that the "literary present" needed to be "lit up", claiming to align itself with those "young people who have the courage of tearing themselves from the crowd." The manifesto went on to explain Minulescu's take on artistic revolution: "[Young people] can only view the past with respect. They reserve their love for the future. [...] Liberty and individuality in art, the preservation of old forms acquired from their elders, the tendency in favor of things new, quaint, bizarre even, only extracting the characteristic parts out of life [...] and only focusing on things that set one man apart from another. [...] If literary tradition finds a revolutionary color on such flagpoles, so be it—we accept it!" Sandqvist summarizes the general objective as: "Art must create something new in any case, always and everywhere".

=== Symbolism meets Futurism and Expressionism ===
Minulescu's moment of glory was unusual in its European context. Paul Cernat, who interprets Aprindeți torțele! as a Symbolist work inspired by the ideas of French cultural critic Remy de Gourmont, notes that, despite the movement's goal of reaching simultaneity with Western culture, the moment of its publication came twenty years after France's original Symbolist Manifesto. By then, Cernat also notes, international Symbolism was falling behind the more vocally anti-establishment expressions of modernism: Acmeism, Cubism, Expressionism, Fauvism, Futurism etc., several of which were coming to describe the older movement as effeminate and compromised. As in Germanic Europe, the Art Nouveau scene of Romania was acting as a catalyst for the new Expressionist tendencies.

The notion that Romanian Symbolism was belated to the point of anachronism is supported by other commentators. George Călinescu wrote: "Baudelaire, Verlaine, the Parnassians and the Symbolists were only discovered in our country almost a century after their emergence [in France]." According to Sandqvist: "The Romanian context is characterized by the fact that the Romanian writers did not synchronize their symbolism with the contemporary, academicized phase of French symbolism, but went straight to the sources and sought out none other than Rimbaud, Baudelaire, Verlaine, and Mallarmé". Literary historian Eugen Negrici reacts against the "illusion" according to which Romanian Symbolism announced the modernist phenomenon, while also arguing: "When, around 1900, French Symbolism was exhausted as a recipe, the Romanian one was just about getting born. Its flowering at roughly the same time as modern European poetry was configuring its typology is what has been leading us to proclaim its modernity."

The post-1908 effort of synchronization with the European scene was a conscious one on the part of some Romanian Symbolists. Citing previous verdicts, linguist Manuela-Delia Suciu suggests that the period saw poets moving closer to the practice of Symbolism, overcoming the mainly theoretical and post-Romantic phase of the 1890s. Sandqvist reports: "Contemporary writers and intellectuals, as well as 'ordinary' readers, were shocked as much by the [Revista Celor L'alți group's] disillusioned, sarcastic, and bizarre way of handling lyrical motifs with the help of, for instance, intertwined sounds, colors, and scents, as by their choice of subject matter, where the city parks, the streets, and the buildings are inhabited by prostitutes, criminals, the insane, and erotomaniacs and where hospitals, restaurants, cathedrals, and palaces play a prominent role as 'scenes of the crime.' Everything anguished, neurotic, macabre, bizarre, exotic, unusual, theatrical, grotesque, elegiac, light-hearted, sensuous, dripping, and monotonous was celebrated as well as everything trivial, everyday, tedious, and empty, at the same time as the poets were borrowing freely from world literature, blending images and metaphors, motifs, and atmospheres."

Minulescu's columns in Revista Celor L'alți, like his parallel articles for Viitorul daily, popularized the works of Symbolist and post-Symbolist writers, from Rimbaud, Jules Laforgue, Albert Samain and the Comte de Lautréamont to Filippo Tommaso Marinetti. According to Cernat, Revista Celor L'alți's choice of name (literally, "the others' magazine") indicated a break with Densusianu's version of Symbolism, although the Vieața Nouă doyen still contributed to Minulescu's review. Also in 1908, Vieața Nouă had published Densusianu's influential praise of free verse poetry, Versul liber și dezvoltarea estetică a limbii literare ("Free Verse and the Aesthetic Development of the Literary Language"). In particular, news about the spread of Futurism divided local writers: Densusianu's skepticism was overshadowed by the indignation of Dumitru Karnabatt. The latter, who would subsequently become a contributor to traditionalist papers, suggested at the time that all the Futurists were insane.

=== Symbolist bohemians ===
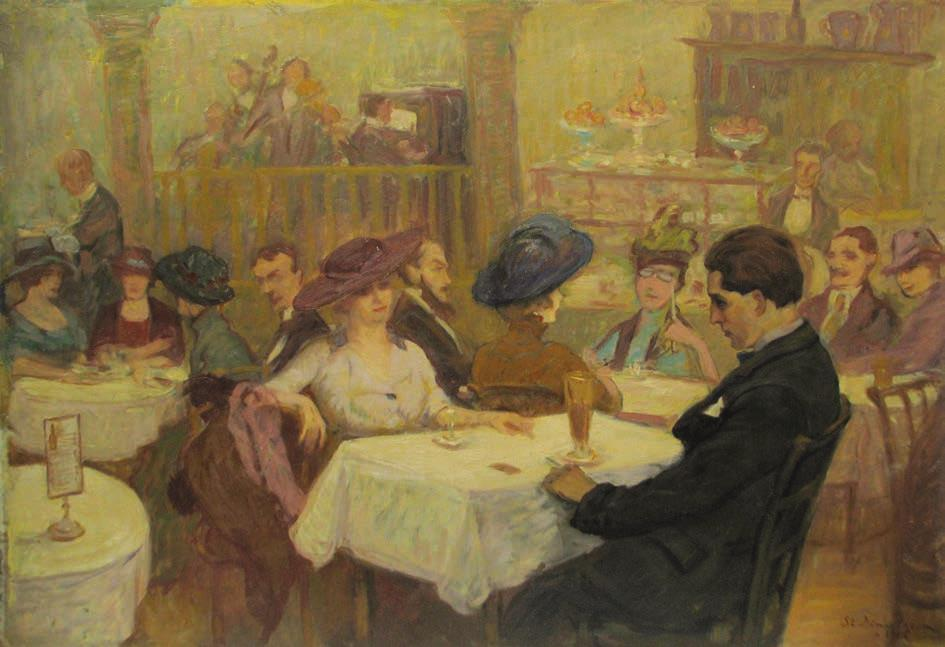
La Oteteleșanu ("Oteteleșanu's") or La berărie ("In the Beer-house"), 1915 satirical painting by the traditionalist Ștefan Dimitrescu

Minulescu's own poetry of the period was noted for its insolent and flamboyant language, its urban themes and its inspiration from romanzas—all characteristics attributed by critics to the Wallachian tradition within Symbolism. Its success with a middle class feminine public was reportedly devastating; it also unusually earned Minulescu the respect of a leading Junimea-bred satirist, Ion Luca Caragiale, noted earlier for his derision of Macedonskian Symbolism.

In Minulescu's time, the Symbolist movement began cultivating a bohemian society, which in turn rested on Romania's older coffee culture. Its use of coffeehouses as informal clubs consequently became at once a mark of Romanian Symbolism and a characteristic of early 20th century literary life. The Symbolists' example in this respect was taken up by traditionalist authors: the two currents soon after faced each other on a daily basis, debating lively in Bucharest establishments such as Casa Capșa, Kübler and Terasa Oteteleșanu. The two camps were however united by professional interest, and together created the Romanian Writers' Society, which became functional in 1909.

Another significant event occurred in 1912, when Macedonski made his return from an extended stay in Paris. His cause charmed the younger poets, among whom Ion Pillat and Horia Furtună became his dedicated promoters and publicists. The late Symbolist period was especially important for Pillat and Furtună, whose poems adhere closely to the models set by Macedonski (in Pillat's case, with an emphasis on exoticism). Pillat's Symbolist debut also had an international aspect: familiarized in Paris with the French Symbolist and Parnassians, he translated their work at home, presided over an "Academy of the 10" while in France, and later authored definitive anthologies of Symbolist poetry. Pillat's colleague Tudor Vianu, who spoke about his own affiliation with Ovid Densusianu's Symbolism in 1913, described the cultural significance of renewed debates: "Romanian Symbolism was a chapter in the permanent querelle des anciens et des modernes. We [Symbolists] were inspired by the idea that modern life may enter the universal synthesis of art and that, once he rises above the archaism and traditionalism of consecrated literary models, a poet must test himself on the road toward those subjects that characterize the life and the civilization of his own age." The informal faction, regrouped around Macedonski, Davidescu and Stamatiad, was soon joined by Alexandru Dominic, Oreste Georgescu, Adrian Maniu and Marcel Romanescu; those who also followed Densusianu included Vianu, Alexandru Colorian, Anastasie Mândru and several other young poets.

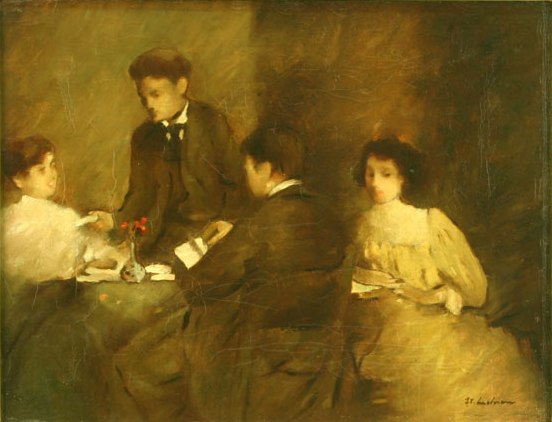
Reuniune literară ("Literary Reunion"), by Ștefan Luchian

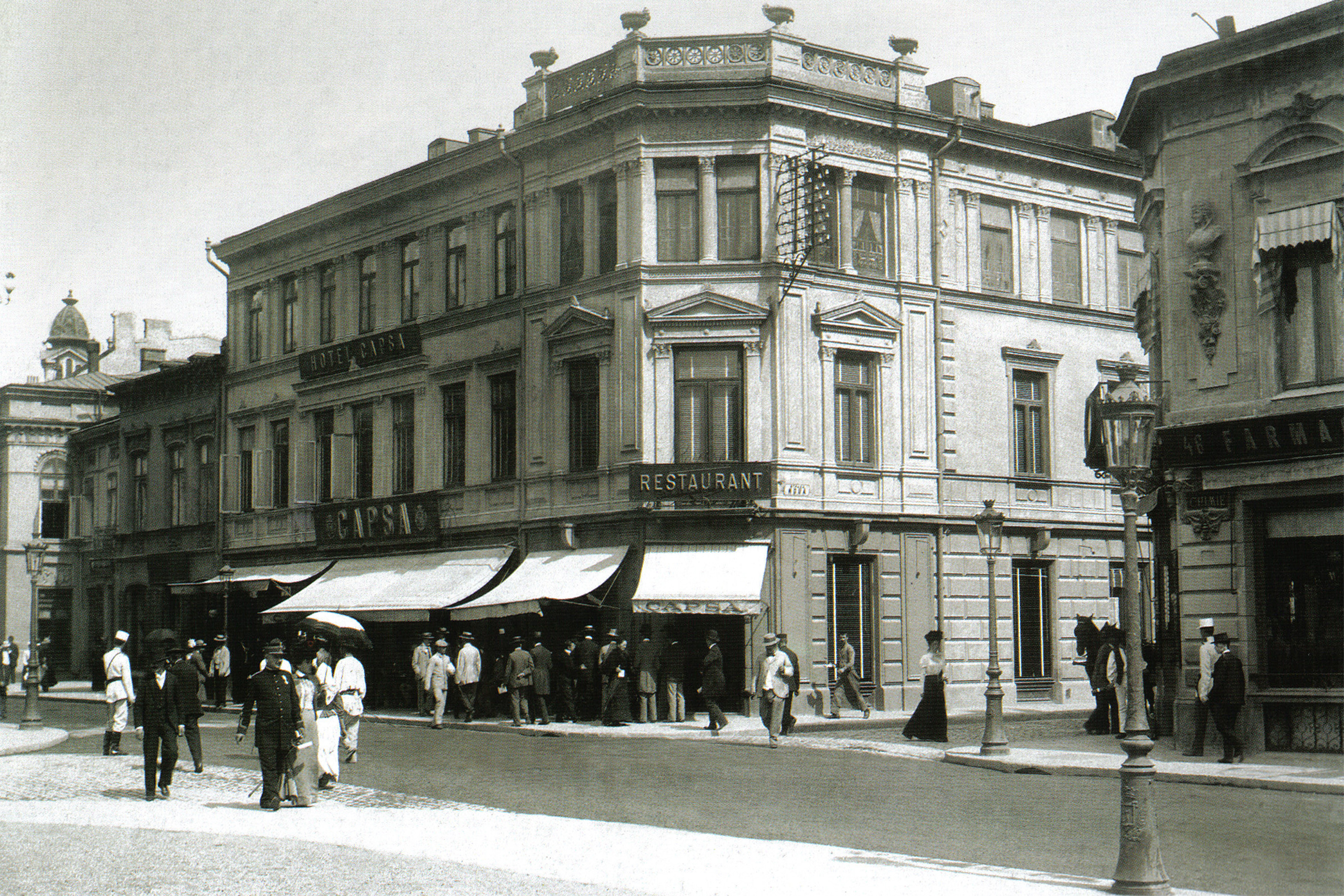
Casa Capșa in 1906

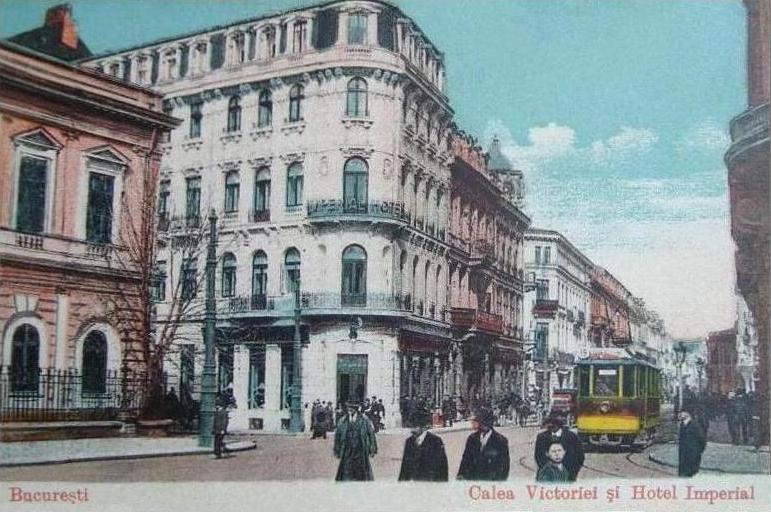
Hotel Imperial, home of Kübler, ca. 1900

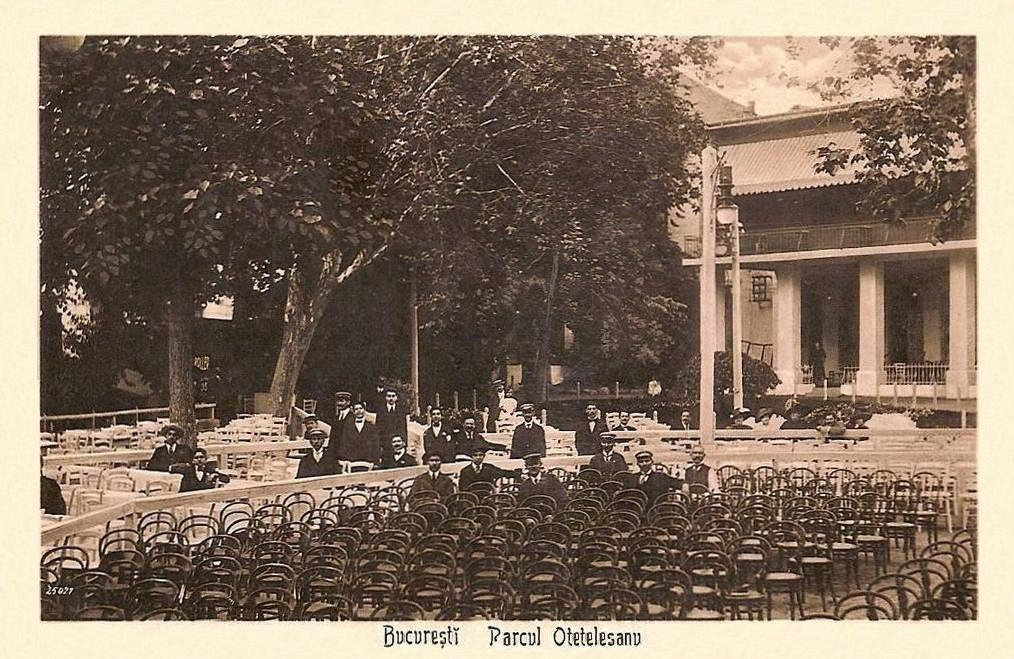
Terasa Oteteleșanu in 1906

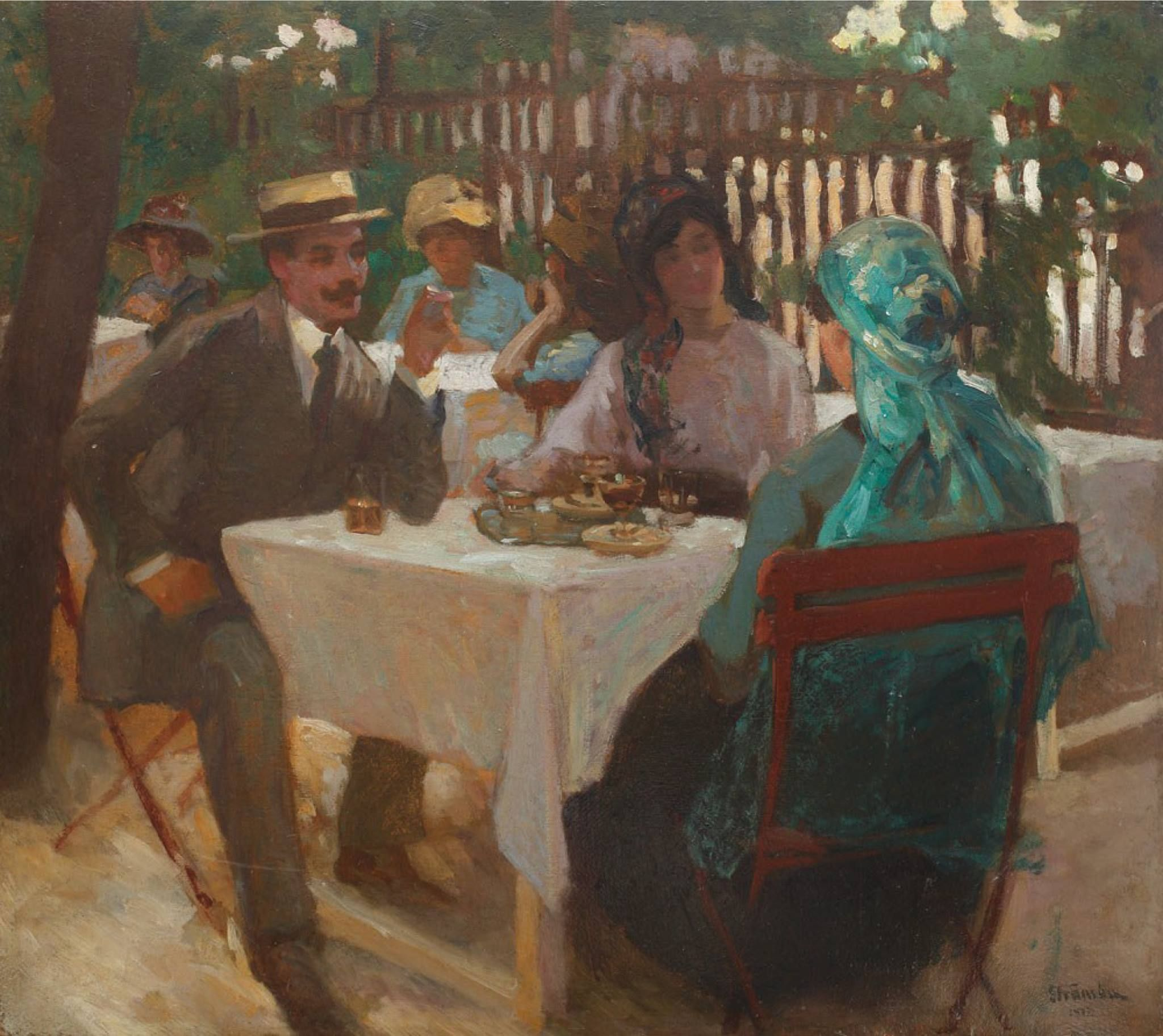
La terasă ("At the Terrace"), by Ipolit Strâmbu

=== Left-wing contacts ===
In the wake of Romania's 1907 Peasants' Revolt, Symbolism was consolidating its links with the left-wing movements, which were at the time recovering from the split of Dobrogeanu-Gherea's Romanian Social Democratic Workers' Party into several small groups. The leftist representatives of Symbolism were finding new allies among the scattered socialist circles and setting up connections with Poporanism, the leftist version of traditionalism. Such contacts were built on Arghezi's collaboration with socialist activist N. D. Cocea and the left-leaning writer Gala Galaction (later known as a Romanian Orthodox theologian), who had started their relationship while working on Linia Dreaptă, moving on to create Viața Socială, Rampa and then on a succession of short-lived papers. The mix of Symbolists and socialists was described as ineffectual by the traditionalist witness Chendi, who, in 1912, argued: "Mr. Cocea wanted to break through and resorted to our young Decadents and Symbolists in Bucharest, who nevertheless, having not one thing in common with the doctrines of socialism, could not pay as much service to the magazine [Viața Socială] as to prevent from going under, in explicable manner."

In Cocea's case, this opening toward modern art was motivated by his generic interest in cultural innovation, explained by him as a wish to surpass both "antiquated artistic formulas" and "the laws of nature". His own literary contribution, only partly connected with Decadentism, was often in the explicitly erotic genre. Arghezi, who had by that moment embarked on and forfeited a career in Orthodox monasticism, was beginning to merge influences from Symbolism with traditionalist and avant-garde poetics, into a new original format. His disappointment with the Church experience was by then also manifested in his search for an alternative spirituality, his vocal anticlericalism and his interest in Christian heresy.

A promoter of both Decadentism and didactic art, Gala Galaction was affiliated with the main Poporanist venue, Viața Românească. The latter magazine, occupying the middle ground between Dobrogeanu-Gherea's socialism and Sămănătorism, was generally opposed to art for art's sake, but had its own separate links with the Symbolist environment. These reached to the top of its editorial board: the publication's ideologue and co-founder Garabet Ibrăileanu sympathized with its lyricism, and, like various other writers from the Poporanist schools, adopted Decadent themes in his own works of fiction. In 1908, the review also hosted one of the first scholarly studies of Symbolism to be produced in Romania, the work of woman critic Izabela Sadoveanu-Evan. Progressively after that date, the Poporanist circle opened itself toward those representatives of Symbolist poetry who had parted with Densusianu's branch, upholding Arghezi as a major Romanian author. It also provided exposure to distinct representatives of feminine Symbolist poetry, illustrated there by Alice Călugăru or Farago. Nevertheless, the aesthetic implications of Ibrăileanu's traditionalism and Viața Românească's cooperation with the governing National Liberal Party drew criticism from the more radical Cocea.

Meanwhile, another distinct link with leftist politics was preserved through the proletarian-themed school of Symbolist poetry, inaugurated by Traian Demetrescu and later illustrated by Bacovia, Mihail Cruceanu, Andrei Naum, Alexandru Toma. This wing of Symbolism, together with the Arghezi-Galaction tandem, also enjoyed close relationships with some advocates of Social Realism, among them I. C. Vissarion and Vasile Demetrius.

=== Symbolist climate and modern art venues ===
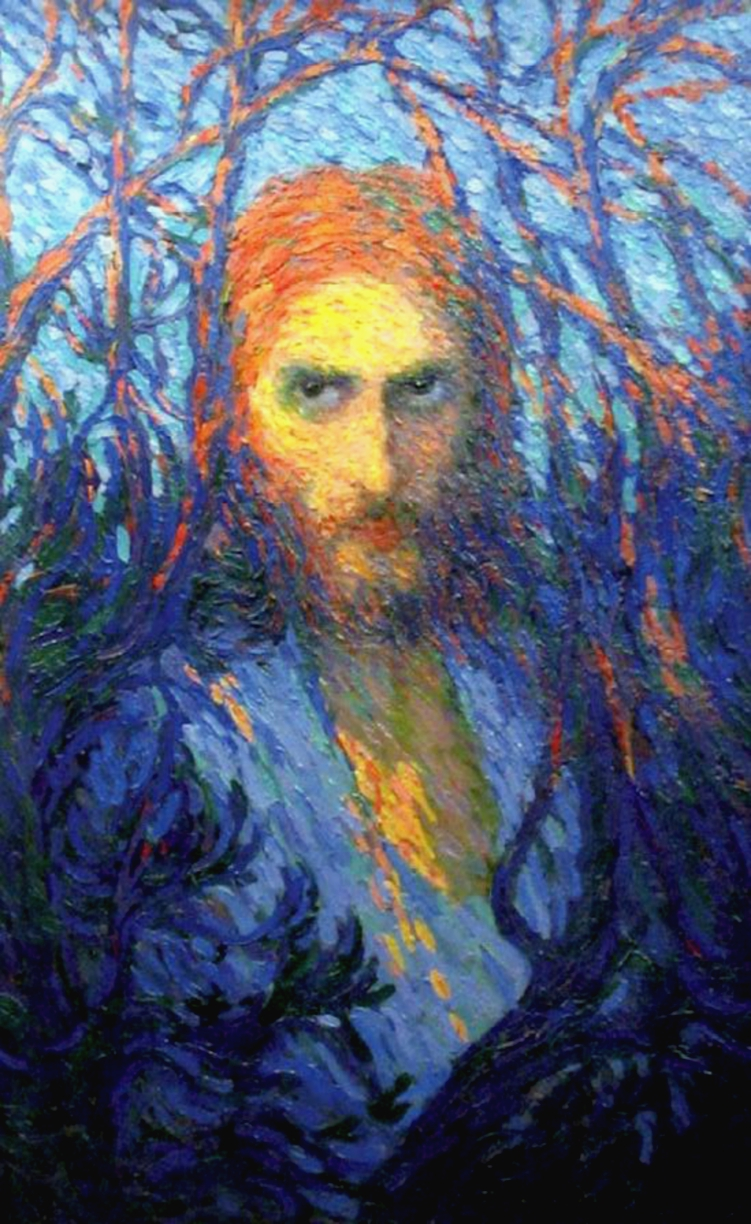
Ion Theodorescu-Sion, Lux in tenebris lucet, 1909

The literary mutation was echoed in local modern art, where the currents emerging from post-Impressionism, Synthetism and Fauvism were being slowly acclimatized. This transition was in large part owed to graphic artist Iosif Iser, known for his adversity to Secession art, but also for his contributions to the German Jugend and his borrowings from Art Nouveau cartoonists like Thomas Theodor Heine and Félix Vallotton. In 1908, Iser organized a Bucharest exhibit of works by French-based modernists André Derain, Jean-Louis Forain and Demetrios Galanis. Also famous as the illustrator of Minulescu and Arghezi, he progressively incorporated the newer artistic styles into his personal palette—resulting in what some have called "Iserism". Like many other artists and writers, he frequented Bogdan-Pitești's newly founded Bucharest club or the artists' colony his patron had set up in Colonești.

According to semiotician Sorin Alexandrescu, there emerged a pattern of anti-Symbolism among Romanian painters, including those who studied with French Symbolist teachers. Alexandrescu writes that Romanian art students were "opaque to both the symbolic substance and the decorative efflorescence that so enthused the Paris of their formative years", only preserving from this environment a love for the "picturesque". Art historians have traditionally placed the moment of rebellion in visual arts in or around 1910, when Tinerimea Artistică finally split into traditionalist-classical Symbolist wing and a modernist one. The period also witnessed the arrival into art criticism of Symbolist poet Theodor Cornel. Although he died a young man in 1911, Cornel is credited with having introduced Romanians to the primitivist and exotic tendencies of post-Impressionism, and to have been among the first authoritative critics in the country to discuss such new phenomena as Cubism or Abstraction, sometimes in competition with the Moldavian Expressionist painter Arthur Segal. This context produced the first works by Romanian primitivists: Cecilia Cuțescu-Storck, Friedrich Storck, Ion Theodorescu-Sion, and, foremost among them, sculptor Constantin Brâncuși.

Of this group, Brâncuși did not generally follow the Symbolist guidelines, and instead reached international fame with an original semi-abstract modernist style influenced by Romanian folklore. Theodorescu-Sion also discarded all forms of Symbolism by the end of the decade, and incorporated into his art the solid shape painting of Paul Cézanne, while Cuțescu-Storck was still a classical Symbolist in 1910. With draftsman Ary Murnu, she contributed Art Nouveau illustrations to the Tinerimea catalogs. By 1911, Tinerimea had also received into its ranks the painter Theodor Pallady, whose debut works were dominated by Symbolist imagery, but who was later a prominent anti-Symbolist.

The new generation of Romanian Symbolist artists also included several sculptors who, like Brâncuși, trained with French master Auguste Rodin: Horia Boambă, Teodor Burcă, Anghel Chiciu, Filip Marin, Ion Jalea, Dimitrie Paciurea, Alexandru Severin. Boambă earned a short-lived notoriety with works contrasting delicate figures with rough surfaces, while Marin alternated academic busts with Symbolist statuettes. A poet as well as sculptor, Severin was close to Alexandru Macedonski, with whom he founded Cenaclul Idealist ("The Idealist Club"), also including painters Alexis Macedonski, Leon Alexandru Biju and Dimitrie Mihăilescu. His sculptures, notably exhibited at the Paris Salon in 1908, displayed his interest in the mysterious or expressed his admiration for Rodin. The young Paciurea was mainly adapting Rodin's Impressionist themes to the Romanian historist school, and only later became a truly Symbolist artist.

=== Insula and Simbolul ===
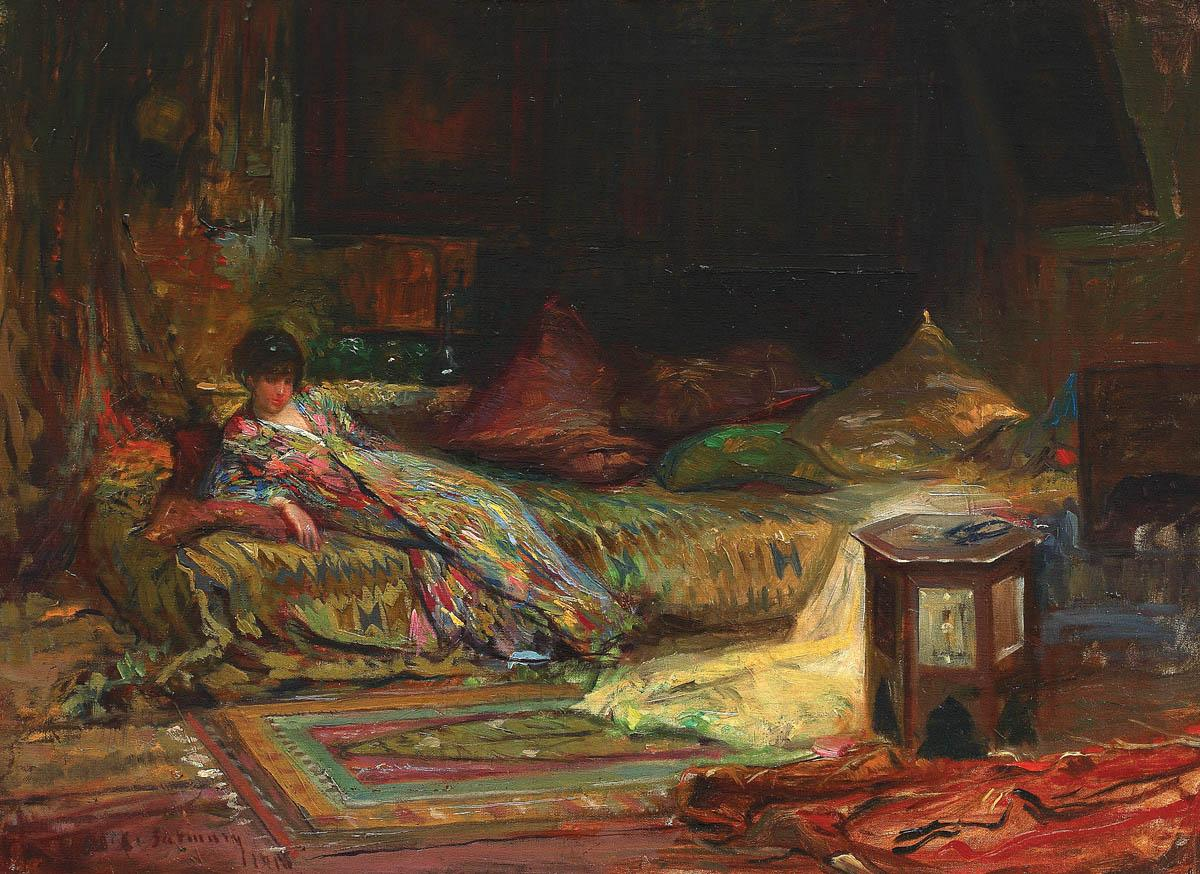
Alexandru Satmari, Interior oriental ("Oriental Interior", 1916), with a portrait of Claudia Millian

Since shortly before the Second Balkan War and continuing down to World War I, local Symbolism experienced other more radical mutations into the avant-garde. Paul Cernat suggests that this interval brought into existence a "Symbolism of the independents" or "people's Symbolism", opposed to Densusianu's version but indebted to "Minulescianism", to Bacovia and to Arghezi. The new expression of Romanian Symbolism, Cernat also notes, was playful, theatrical and centered on the petite bourgeoisie, receiving post-Symbolist influences not just from Expressionism and Futurism, but also from Imagism, 'Pataphysics or Zutisme. As the inventor of Futurism and propagandist of the new artistic credo, Filippo Tommaso Marinetti maintained close links with Romanian intellectuals, efforts which notably brought him into contact with Alexandru Macedonski.

These new tendencies made an impact on the work of established figures within the Symbolist movement. Minulescu began infusing his original Symbolist style with borrowings from more radical modernists, becoming one of the few Romanian authors of the 1910s to incorporate elements of Futurism, and introducing some Expressionist techniques in his works for the stage. In parallel, Bacovia modified his own style by appropriating characteristics of Expressionist poetry. Among the new representatives of this trend were the innovative poet Adrian Maniu and his younger emulators, Ion Vinea and Tristan Tzara. All of them, in varying degrees, owed inspiration to the innovative Symbolism of Laforgue, whose hallmark poetic motif, that of the hanged man, they each reworked into tribute poems. Maniu parted with Symbolism almost immediately after this stage, and the form of post- and anti-Symbolist experimental literature he generated helped to inspire similar moves on his colleagues' part.

Published in spring 1912, Minulescu's new review Insula consecrated some of these developments. In Cernat's view, the new publication surpassed Revista Celor L'alți in both radicalism and public exposure. It hosted contributions by poet and critic N. Davidescu, who clarified the magazine's position in a series of articles, postulating a difference between Decadentism (seen as a negative phenomenon and identified as such with traditionalism) and Symbolism. Elsewhere, his texts spoke about Futurism as having some "absurd and useless parts", and being overall monotonous. Davidescu's own poetry of the period modernized borrowings from Baudelaire, Macedonski and Paul Verlaine, exploring the exotic and the macabre.

The circle of Insula affiliates notably included Bacovia, Beldie, Cruceanu, Dragoslav, Karnabatt, Ștefănescu-Est, Vițianu, and (on his literary debut) Maniu. They were joined by Șerban Bascovici, D. Iacobescu, Emil Isac, Mihail Săulescu, Theodor Solacolu, Eugeniu Sperantia, Dem. Theodorescu and Minulescu's wife Claudia Millian. These authors illustrated a diversity of approaches within the Symbolist milieu. Many preserved the fascination with the exotic, from Ștefănescu-Est's colorful depictions of imaginary lands to Săulescu's dreams of solitary atolls, whereas Isac's version of Symbolism created unconventional lyrical pieces, mostly noted for their Imagism and their ironic twists. The focus on decorative and artificial subjects was also preserved by Millian, in works which often depict scenes of seduction, and by Sperantia, who found his niche on the margin of Parnassianism. In contrast to Minulescu's cheerfulness and in agreement with the Moldavian wing of the Symbolist movement, Iacobescu wrote sad poems reflecting his losing battle with tuberculosis, and gained a following among young Romanian intellectuals. Other than these writers, the Insula group played home to Nae Ionescu, the future far-right philosopher—at the time a cultural promoter with Futurist and syndicalist sympathies.

Late in the same year, Vinea, Tzara and graphic artist Marcel Janco—all still high school students at the time—began publishing Simbolul magazine. This new Symbolist and post-Symbolist tribune received contributions from Minulescu, from his Insula group, and even from Macedonski. Among the other contributors were Poldi Chapier, Alfred Hefter-Hidalgo, Barbu Solacolu, Constantin T. Stoika and George Stratulat. Especially through the articles of Maniu and Emil Isac, the paper made a point of shunning convention, rekindling polemics with the traditionalists. Janco, together with Iser, Maniu and Millian, provided the illustrations for the few issues Simbolul published before closing down in December 1912. Cocea's new socialist magazine, Facla, signified the start of collaborations between the leftist activists and various of the Simbolul contributors. Illustrated by Iser, the magazine enlisted Vinea as a literary columnist—inaugurating the adolescent poet's parallel evolution into an opinion journalist with socially radical views. Rebelling against traditional, positivist criticism, the young author made sustained efforts to familiarize his public with aesthetic alternatives: Walt Whitman and Guillaume Apollinaire's poetry, Gourmont's essays, the theoretical particularities of Russian Symbolism etc.

=== Eclectic magazines ===
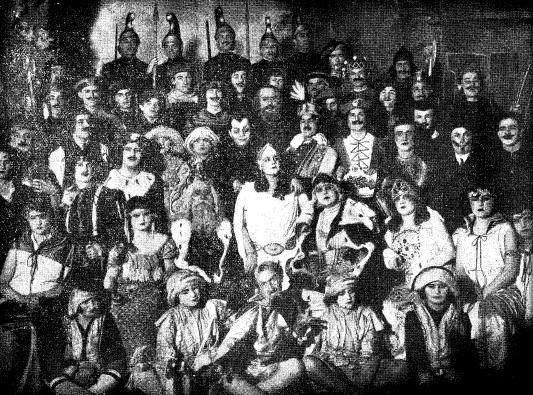
Amateur actors in costume for a performance of Înșir'te mărgărite (Oradea, 1926)

A product of Densusianu's school, the Iași-based magazine Versuri și Proză grouped various of Densusianu's admirers: I. M. Rașcu (the publication's founder), Cruceanu, Sperantia, Stamatiad, Vițianu. Both Rașcu and Cruceanu favored a delicate Symbolism individualized by exotic settings (Cruceanu) or Roman Catholic devotion (Rașcu). Versuri și Proză nevertheless gave positive coverage to Futurism, hosting contributions from Arghezi, Bacovia, Macedonski and Minulescu alike, as well as from more rebellious modernist authors and new wave Symbolists—including articles by its co-editor Hefter-Hidalgo, pieces by Maniu and the first-ever works signed by F. Brunea-Fox. The publication also registered the debut of Perpessicius, later known as a poet and critic with Symbolist sensibilities, and the early lyrical works of Nicolae Budurescu and Dragoș Protopopescu. In parallel, others who followed Densusianu's principles went on to create provincial versions of Vieața Nouă: Farul, Sărbătoarea Eroilor and Stamatiad's Grădina Hesperidelor.

Symbolists like Minulescu or Arghezi also found unexpected backing from the conservative Junimist Mihail Dragomirescu and his disciple Ion Trivale, art for art's sake advocates who allowed such works to be published in their Convorbiri Critice magazine. Their literary club was also home to Stamatiad, Anastasie Mândru, I. Dragoslav and other young men who admired Macedonski. This attitude, Cernat suggests, was linked to Dragomirescu's personal preference for Richard Wagner's theories on music, which showed a predisposition for modernism, and which had led him into a debate with his former mentor Maiorescu. Likewise, art historian Adriana Șotropa notes that both Dragomirescu and Trivale promoted an individual form of Aestheticism, while Dragomirescu biographer Adrian Tudorachi assessed that Convorbiri Critice and the Symbolists shared a love for "interiority" in literary expression. Despite such points of contact, Trivale was mostly noted for his overall rejection of Symbolist literature, and the Convorbiri Critice circle endured as a permanent target for ridicule on the part of young modernists. Another Junimist figure, Constantin Rădulescu-Motru, opened his paper Noua Revistă Română to contributions from various figures in the Symbolist and modernist field. The conservative venue notably published Tzara's early poems, Cocea's art chronicles, the pro-Symbolist articles of novelist Felix Aderca and various pieces by the Simbolul group.

The post-Junimist magazines were joined in this context by Constantin Banu's eclectic review, Flacăra, itself noted for circulating the writings of young Symbolists and post-Symbolists. One new voice emerging from its circle was Victor Eftimiu, whose work in drama was largely a neoromantic adaptation a fairy tale format, with the genre conventions introduced by Edmond Rostand (Înșir'te mărgărite). His other contributions in verse moved between the extremes of Neoclassical reworkings of Greek mythology and sentimental Symbolism. Also affiliated for a while with Flacăra, where he made his debut as a poet, Tudor Vianu later turned to a career in literary history, and was especially noted for the moderation of his views.

In addition to such critical inclusivism, the Symbolist movement profited from the intercession of established journalists with Symbolist credentials: Beldie, Cocea and Pillat, all of whom promoted it within the mainstream press. The environment hosted poet Barbu Nemțeanu, whose version of Symbolism generally followed an "intimist" perspective, alternating with humorous depictions of provincial life. Another poet in this succession was Luca Caragiale, whose work stood for a cosmopolitan reinterpretation of urban kitsch.

=== Cross-cultural Symbolism and ethnic enclaves ===
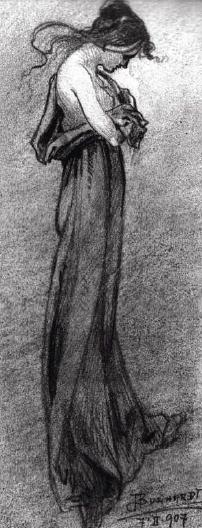
Ink drawing by Hans Bulhardt (1907)

A distinct milieu to participate in the post-Symbolist transition was that of Jewish-Romanian writers and artists, a category to which Iacobescu, Nemțeanu, Aderca, Brunea-Fox, Hefter-Hidalgo, Iser, Janco and Tzara all belonged. Traditionally seen by various critics as a coagulating factor for the emerging avant-garde, to which they purportedly contributed their ideal of eluding shtetl culture, their protest in favor of political emancipation, and their secularist graft of Jewish philosophy, these figures were received with interest by the left-wing Symbolists, who militated for cultural pluralism and social integration. Originally writing in the line of "Moldavian" Symbolism and Arghezi, to which he attached the influence of his Hasidic roots and bucolic echoes from Romanian traditionalism, poet and critic Benjamin Fondane (Fundoianu) became a leading exponent of this process. Over the late 1910s also, his writings incorporated echoes from Expressionism, announcing his eventual presence at the forefront of Romania's avant-garde.

In the years before World War I erupted on Romania's border, the Iași modernist environment witnessed the journalistic debut of two Jewish intellectuals, each of them owners of a literary review with Symbolist and leftist agendas who declared their allegiance to Arghezi: Eugen Relgis (Fronda) and Isac Ludo (Absolutio). In parallel, a Jewish and Zionist application of Art Nouveau, directly inspired by the art of Galician lithographer Ephraim Moses Lilien, was developed in drawing by Reuven Rubin (whose paintings of the time experimented with primitivist aesthetics). Symbolism also covers an early period in the career of Lola Schmierer Roth, the Galați-born Jewish artist.

Located at the time in Austria-Hungary, the regions of Transylvania and Banat were largely inhabited by ethnic Romanian people, but, before the 1918 political union, were virtually untouched by Romanian Symbolism. Despite the Transylvanian origins of Densusianu, Iosif or Emil Isac, and the massive circulation of French Symbolist texts by the Romanian newspapers of Arad and Blaj (Românul, Unirea), the impact of Symbolism among the Romanians on the northern slope of the Carpathians remained minor, and the appeal of traditionalist literature in such communities was virtually unchallenged. Some Symbolist echoes were captured in the poems of Octavian Goga, editor of the traditionalist paper Luceafărul, as well as in the paintings of Octavian Smigelschi.

This lack of interest was contrasted by the region's Magyar and Saxon intelligentsia, which assimilated international Art Nouveau and, more distantly, Symbolism as vehicles of national revival, in line with the architectural work of Ödön Lechner. In some of the Transylvanian urban centers, including Baia Mare (Nagybánya), Oradea (Nagyvárad), Cluj (Kolozsvár), Târgu Mureș (Marosvásárhely) and Timișoara (Temesvár), the public commissioned Art Nouveau buildings from major architects, such as Lechner and Otto Wagner. Among the German-speaking Transylvanian Saxons and the Romanians, an early Symbolism was promoted by Hans Bulhardt. Transylvanian contributors to Symbolism and post-Symbolism in Hungarian art or literature include polymath Károly Kós and some early members of the Baia Mare School of painting. Vienna Secession aesthetics had some influence on several Transylvanian-born Hungarians, from Symbolist poet Endre Ady and modern classical composer Béla Bartók to painters Emerich Tamás, Árpád Vida, István Balogh.

Later, artist János Mattis-Teutsch moved between Secession Symbolism, Der Blaue Reiter and Abstraction, while also bridging the parallel developments of Hungarian, Saxon and Romanian art. This communication between Hungarian and Romanian Symbolism was also taken up by the early modernist magazine Nyugat (which notably published works by Isac) and by the Secession-inspired socialist painter Aurel Popp.

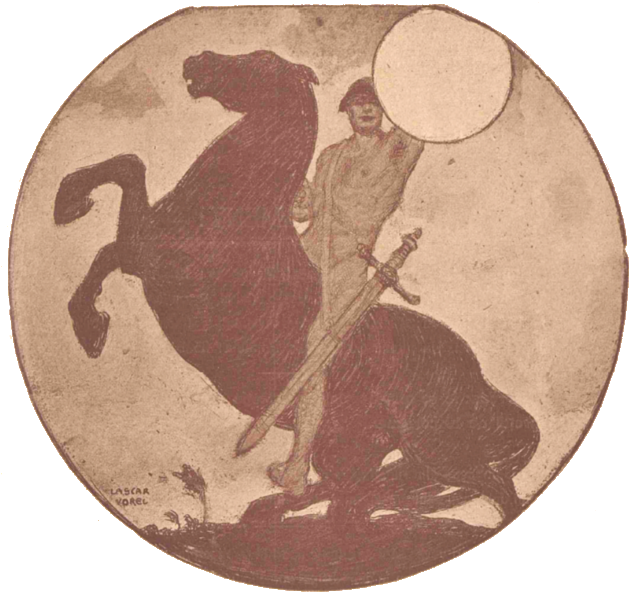
Cover art for Luceafărul, April 1904, by Lascăr Vorel

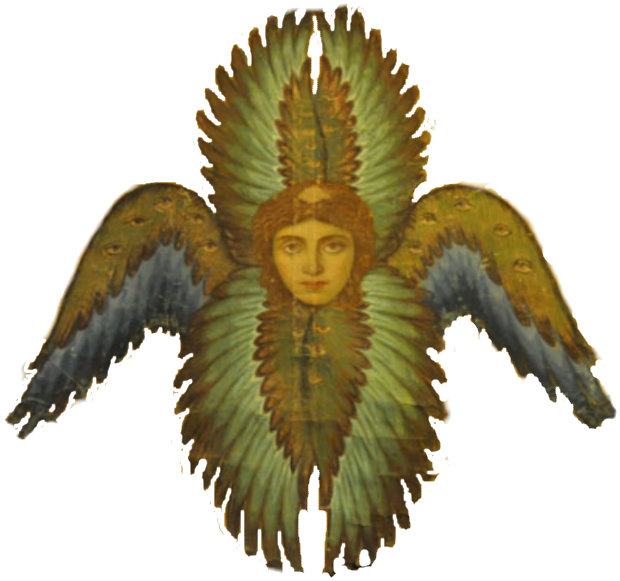
Seraphim by Octavian Smigelschi, Holy Trinity Cathedral, Blaj (1903)

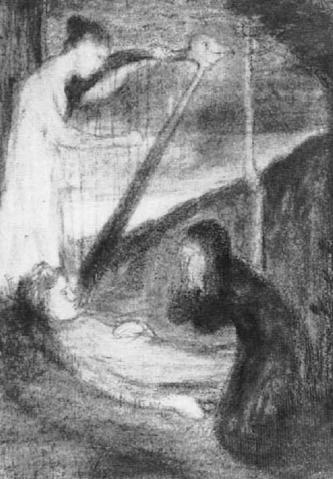
Drawing by Emerich Tamás (1901)

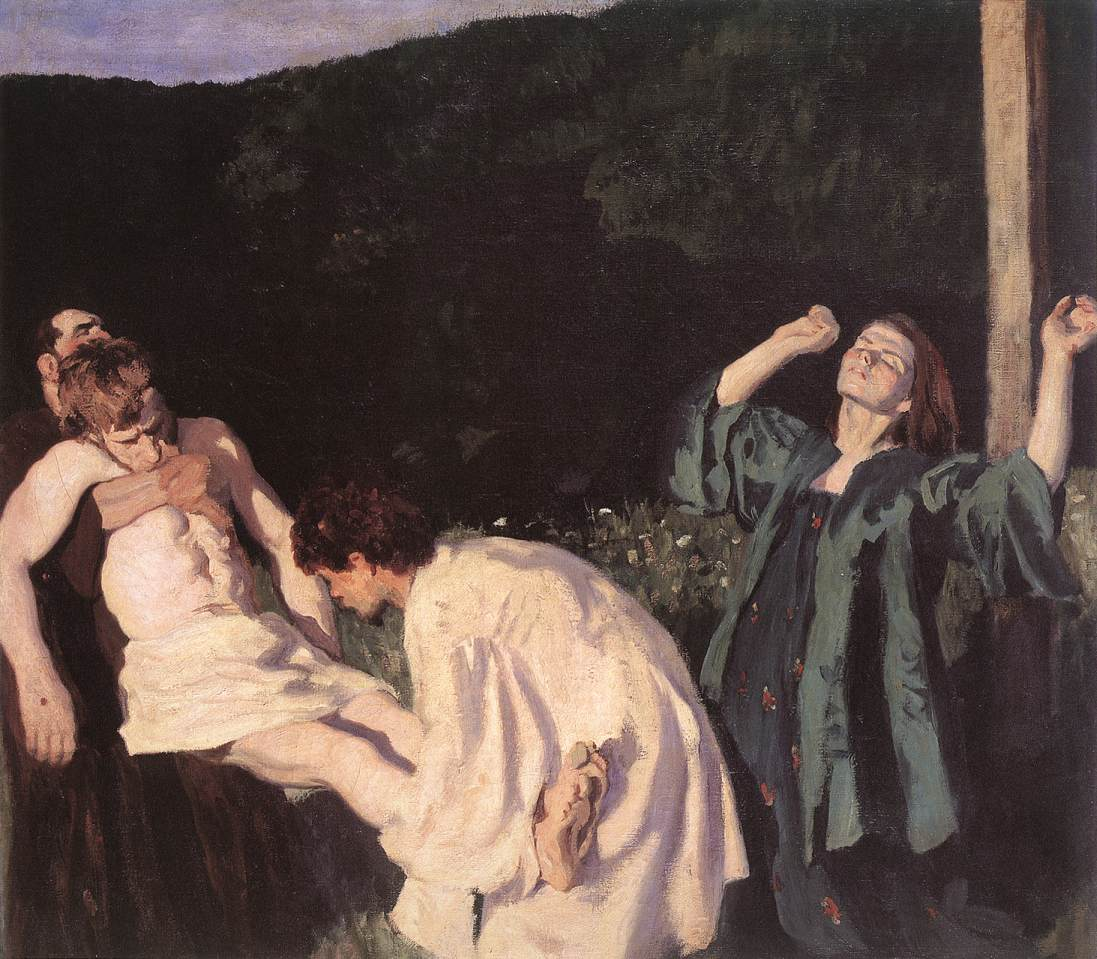
Keresztlevétel ("Descent from the Cross", 1903), by the Baia Mare School painter Károly Ferenczy

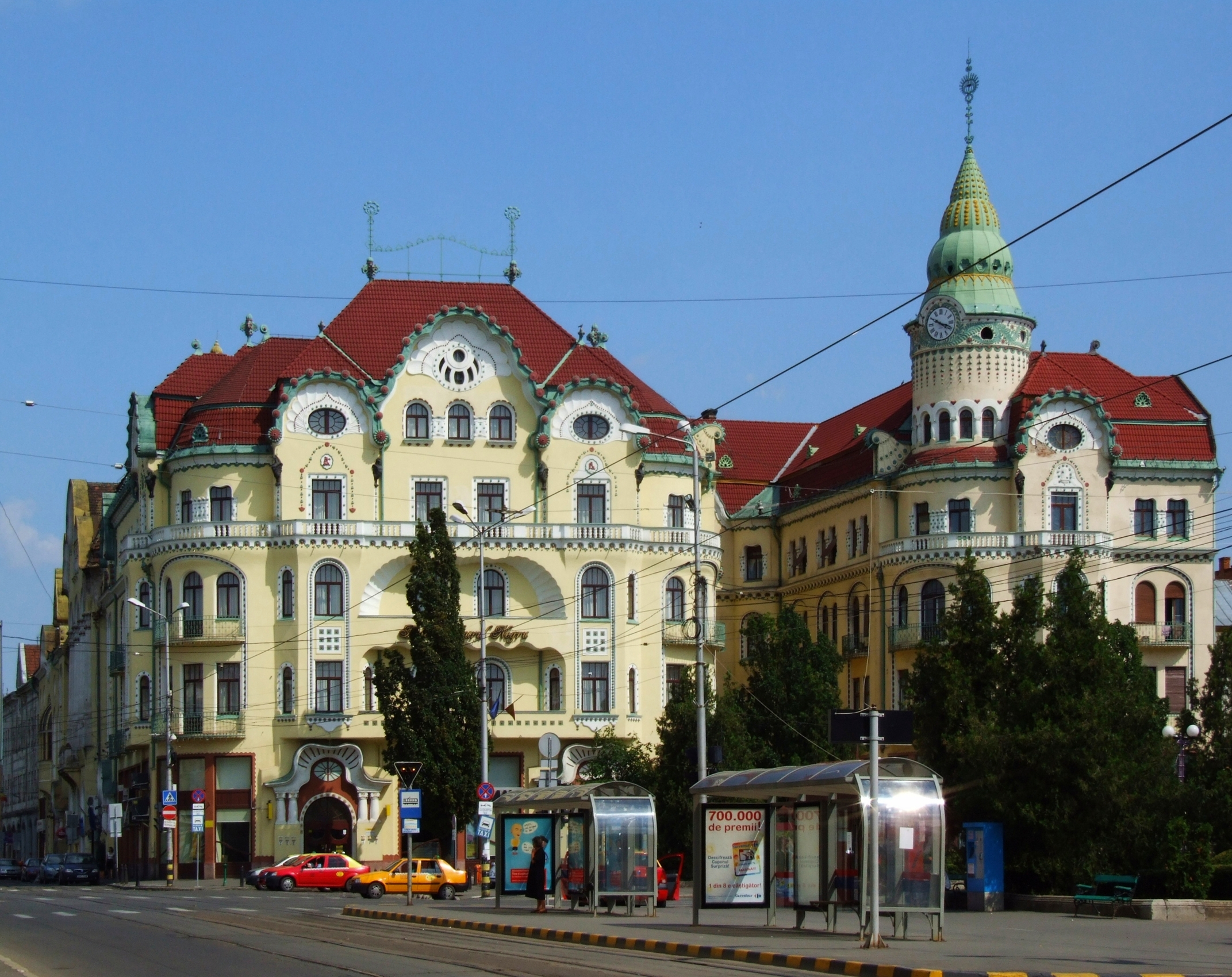
The Art Nouveau Black Eagle Palace in Oradea

== Late Symbolism ==
=== World War I splits and decline ===
From late 1914 to early 1916, during the period when Romania conserved its neutrality while World War I raged in neighboring areas, the new Symbolist generation was also radicalizing itself on political grounds, identifying with ideals such as pacifism and proletarian internationalism. The political message was expressed through a number of publications that were both literary and polemical in nature: Arghezi's Cronica, Bogdan-Pitești's Seara and, most subversively, Cocea's Facla and Chemarea. The latter was edited by Vinea, and primarily functioned as an avatar of Cocea's political press, surfacing and resurfacing under various names in his attempt to elude wartime censorship. Its cultural agenda and its move away from Symbolism were however identified by Paul Cernat in the disparate graphic and literary elements: cover reproductions of works by Félix Vallotton; Tzara's first non-Symbolist poems and Vinea's own "incisive" program; satirical pieces ridiculing Nicolae Iorga's new publications and the neo-Sămănătorist current; polemics with the supporters of Romanian Symbolism at Vieața Nouă and Flacăra. Rather than constituting a voice for the avant-garde, Cernat notes, Chemarea symbolized a moment when "the Romanian pre-avant-garde plugged itself into the pulse of a European-wide sensitivity touched by the radical crisis of its dominating values." Similarly, Sandqvist (building on previous assessments from Romanian writer Eugène Ionesco), discusses the Chemarea group as a Symbolist faction, borrowing freely from the avant-garde.

The war scattered and divided the various Symbolist milieus along the larger divide between the Entente and Central Powers camps. A significant portion of the movement split with Francophilia, either by campaigning in favor of pacifism or by rallying with the Central Powers' cause. A notorious case was that of Bogdan-Pitești, by then host to a large circle of protégé writers or artists, who used his position and wealth to advance a Germanophile ideal. The old Macedonski, by then disappointed with France and the Francophiles, was also sympathetic to the German cause. In contrast, the pro-Entente cause was enthusiastically supported by those Symbolists who still strongly identified with Francophilia: Minulescu, Densusianu, N. Davidescu, Victor Eftimiu.

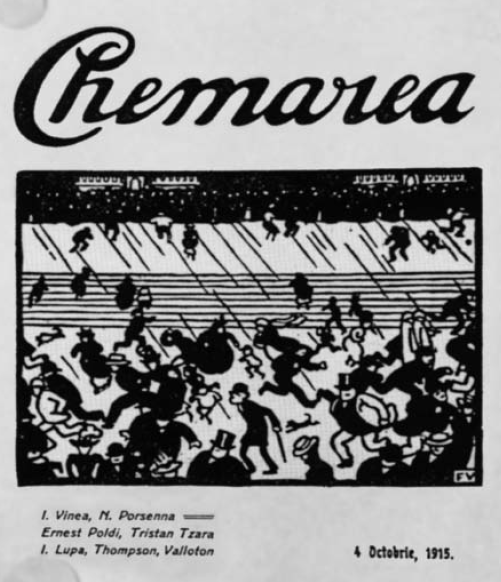
Cover of Chemarea, dated October 4, 1915. Drawing by Félix Vallotton

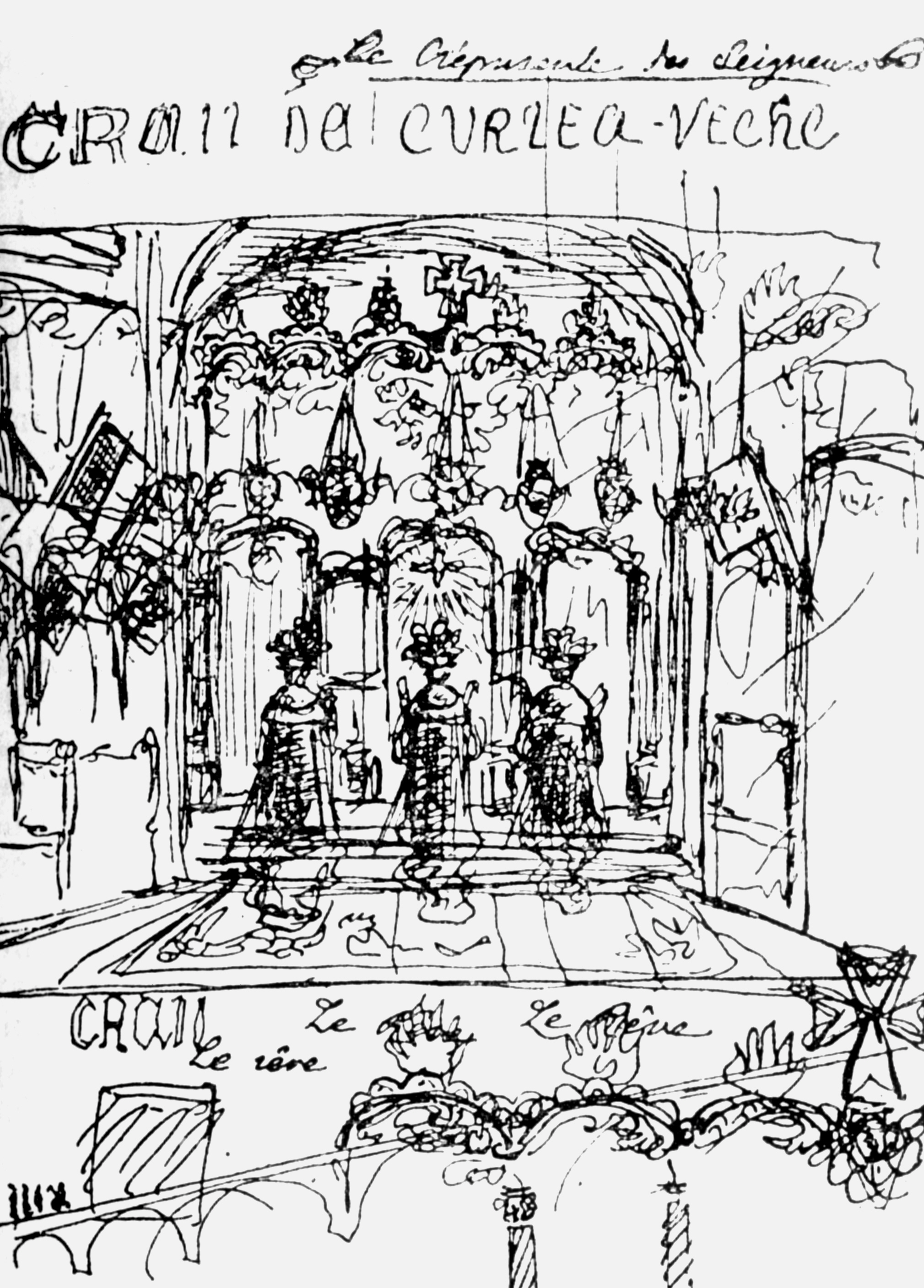
Mateiu Caragiale's own illustration to his Craii de Curtea-Veche

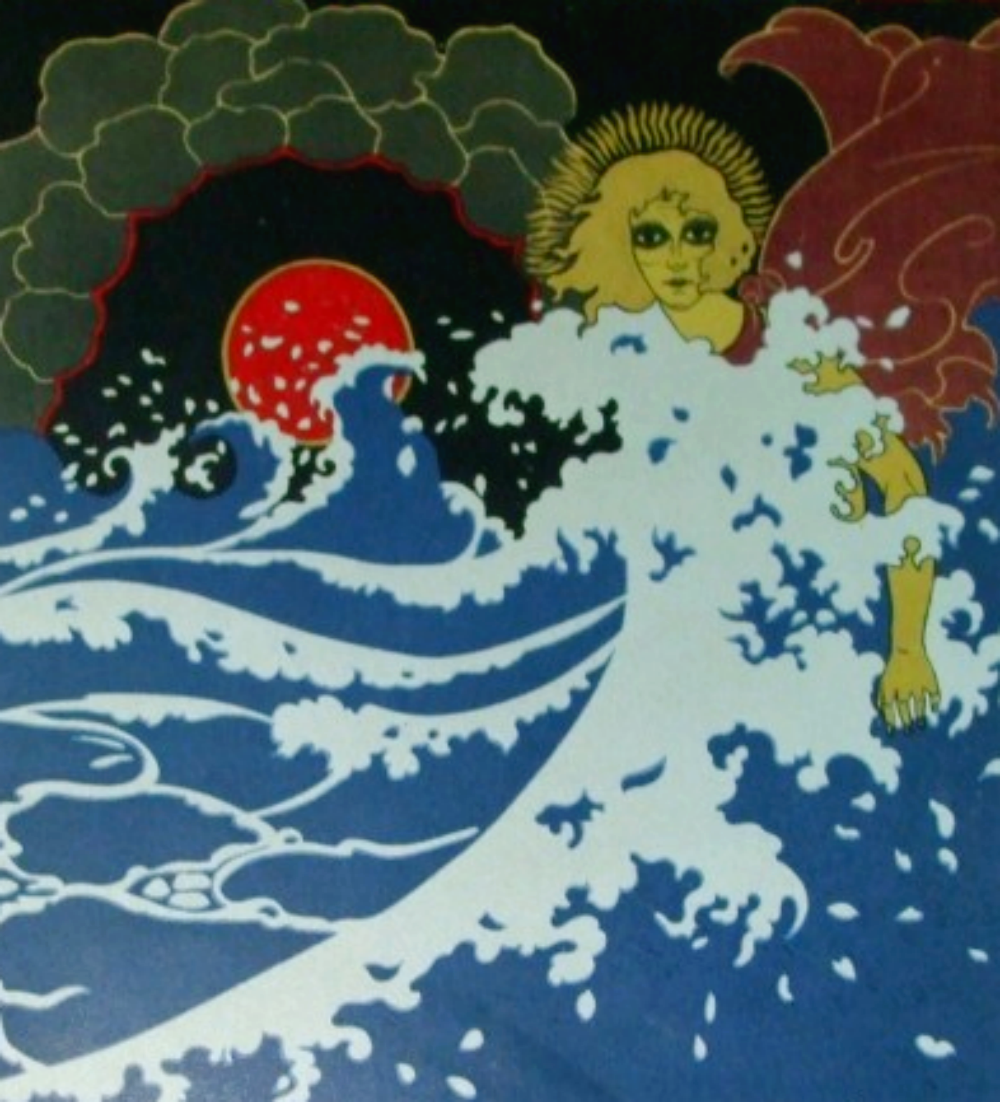
1923 illustration to Mihai Eminescu's Luceafărul, by Mișu Teișanu

The situation became conflictual after the National Liberal cabinet rallied Romania with the Entente, opening Romania to a German-led invasion and having to take refuge in Iași. Several of the Symbolists and modernists in Bucharest were among those who either continued to support or did not actively reject the Central Powers' administration of Romania, leaving their adversaries in Iași to describe them as collaborationists. After the armistice with Germany of 1918, this charge resulted in the arrest of several Symbolist figures, Arghezi, Bogdan-Pitești, Galaction and Dumitru Karnabatt among them. Adrian Maniu and Luca Caragiale maintained links with the occupiers, but avoided prosecution. Cocea, who supported the Entente in the name of Francophile ideals, spent part of the war years in the Russian Empire, where he was won over by far left ideas shortly before the October Revolution, returning to his country a committed communist.

=== Interwar survivals ===
The voice of Symbolism was preserved in the writings of some old affiliates who remained active on the literary scene, but also found new adherents. Already known for his Symbolist poetry and stories, Mateiu Caragiale made a late and critically acclaimed debut in the novel form with Craii de Curtea-Veche, noted for its merger of modernist tone and Decadentist aesthetics. It earned Caragiale a large following, and, as late as 2001, was nominated by a panel of critics "the best 20th century Romanian novel". One of the new Symbolists, Camil Baltazar, preserved the Moldavian tendency, including the elements it shared with the avant-garde, producing a distinctly morose poetry that romanticized tuberculosis. The choice of similar subjects marked early chapters in the poetry of Demostene Botez and Dimitrie Batova. In contrast, poets such as George Gregorian, Ion Al-George, Perpessicius and George Talaz cultivated Symbolist subjects with Neoclassical touches and elements from the local lyrical tradition. Other poets illustrating this new Symbolist tendency were Grigore Bărgăuanu, Mihail Celarianu, Dumitru Gherghinescu-Vania, Ion Sofia Manolescu, Virgiliu Moscovici-Monda, I. Valerian and D. N. Teodorescu, joined by Mihai Moșandrei. More or less pronounced echoes from French Symbolism were also present in the work of some poets who were affiliated with Viața Românească's interwar circle: Păstorel Teodoreanu, Otilia Cazimir, Alexandru Al. Philippide. In line with these developments, the interwar also preserved a role in mainstream academic criticism for two former Symbolist promoters, Perpessicius and Tudor Vianu.

The creation of Greater Romania brought late Symbolism into Bessarabia, stimulating the Bessarabian literary scene. A generation of Romanian-speaking Bessarabian poets embraced Symbolism, in some cases with influences from other forms of modern writing. Particularly relevant in this context, George Meniuc embraced Symbolist poetry before moving toward Romanian traditionalism. The proliferation of Bessarabian Symbolism, often alongside Expressionism, was encouraged by several literary magazines—a leading presence among them was Viața Basarabiei, which officially claimed to be a neo-Sămănătorist publication, followed by Bugeacul, Poetul and Itinerar. The Symbolist school's representatives in that region were a diverse gathering. Meniuc's way of merging traditionalism with Symbolism and other currents was notably followed by Nicolai Costenco or Alexandru Robot. Other authors in this succession are Sergiu Grossu, Bogdan Istru, Teodor Nencev, Eugenio Coșeriu, Liviu Deleanu and Magda Isanos. Late in the 1920s, Romanian Symbolist poetry was also having echoes in Albanian literature, primarily through the work of Albanian Romanian resident Aleksandër Stavre Drenova.

In visual arts, Symbolism still had some interwar followers. Tinerimea Artistică survived nominally until 1947, but lost its significance even before 1920. The voice of Symbolism was kept alive through a late arrival, sculptor Dimitrie Paciurea. His work in the 1920s comprised a series of Secession-inspired "Chimeras", which earned much critical attention. Paciurea reportedly shocked traditionalist sensibilities—an admirer, painter Nicolae Tonitza, wrote that it left "cretin smiles" on the faces of experts. His later work bridged such influences with admiration for Mihai Eminescu's poetry and the Byzantine revival aesthetics. Painter Ceclia Cuțescu-Storck revived Art Nouveau in her historically themed murals and stained glass work. In decorative art as well as in book illustration, Symbolism and Art Nouveau were prolonged well into the 1930s by the work of Costin Petrescu, Lucia Beller, Mișu Teișanu, and Mina Byck Wepper.

=== Interwar returnees and Sburătorul ===
Various critics have discussed the presence of or even return to Symbolism within the avant-garde environment, despite its radicalization as Futurism, Dada, Surrealism or Constructivism. The neutrality years had witnessed a milestone in the history of avant-garde literature, with the activity of Urmuz, an eccentric civil servant whose life ended in public suicide. Urmuz's absurdist prose, occasionally supported by the performance art of his actor friend George Ciprian, fascinated the bohemian environment, but was only published with Arghezi's assistance in the 1920s. Following a parallel avant-garde trend, Tzara and Janco settled in neutral Switzerland during the war years, where they contributed to the very invention of Dada. Rallying from Romania with his former Simbolul colleagues, Vinea stated his affiliation with the radical trends, while remaining an eclectic and overall isolated figure. Contimporanul, the magazine he founded with Janco upon the latter's return to Romania, moved between radical politics, eclectic Constructivism and praise for Arghezi's poetic synthesis.

Writing at the time, both Vinea and Benjamin Fondane looked back critically on Romanian Symbolism, describing it as imitative, in whole or in part, of France's model, and as such detrimental to Romanian authenticity or spontaneity. Their jargon notwithstanding, Contimporanul still published the work of authors who urged respect for Symbolism (most notably, the journalist Horia Verzeanu). Despite the successive avant-garde episodes, Vinea himself preserved a traceable link to Symbolism, which resurfaced in his works of poems and prose until the final years in his life (according to one interpretation, the link with Symbolism was even preserved by Tzara himself, despite his international profile in Dada and Surrealism). Moving between Fondane's version of bucolic literature and a similar commitment to Surrealism, the younger Jewish poet Ilarie Voronca maintained links with Symbolist poetics throughout his career. Contimporanul itself remained open to the contribution of other Symbolists throughout its existence, and, as a consequence, alienated the new avant-garde trend of the early 1930s. In particular, the refusal of severing links with the Symbolist past and their overall eclecticism, made both Vinea and Voronca the targets of ridicule from the more radical Surrealist faction around unu review. However, the latter environment also kept a traceable link to Symbolist aesthetics, particularly the literary wing of Secession art, through the fiction and translations of H. Bonciu.

Despite having been lampooned by Facla, Insula and the other Symbolist circles, literary theorist Eugen Lovinescu came to identify with the essence of Romanian modernism by the 1920s. Initially inspired by the Junimea guidelines and the critical tradition of his native Moldavia, he slowly adapted his style to Impressionist literature, but for long remained skeptic of more ambitious modernist experimentation. Eventually, Lovinescu's ideology came to resemble Symbolism: there various point of contact between his main tribune, Sburătorul, and the more nostalgic wing of post-Symbolism, and Lovinescu was for a while credited as a "Symbolist critic". He was nevertheless still a censor of those Symbolists who had sided with the Central Powers during the wartime regimes. This hostile attitude further irritated his various adversaries, who found it ironic that the former enemy of Symbolism had come to be perceived by the general public as the leading authority on modernism.

Gravitating between Sburătorul and Contimporanul were various new poets with eclectic tastes, who cultivated a poetry based on the aesthetics of mystery and formal purism. These "hermeticist" or "Orphic" authors, having as their leading representatives Ion Barbu and the younger Dan Botta, moved its international reference point back to the roots of Symbolism, with Edgar Allan Poe. In varying degrees, this tendency was also illustrated by Radu Boureanu, Barbu Brezianu, Eugen Jebeleanu, Simion Stolnicu, Cicerone Theodorescu and Andrei Tudor. In Transylvania, another school of poets, presided over by Aron Cotruș, cultivated a merger of modernist social protest and rural settings, but with distinct echoes from Russian Symbolism, while Radu Stanca experimented with Symbolism and Aestheticism before joining the Sibiu Literary Circle.

=== From censorship to Neosymbolism ===
The 1920s and '30s witnessed a transition of various formerly Symbolist authors toward folkloric traditionalism. This was in particular the case of Maniu (who did not entirely abandon his modernist language, but fused it into a new style) and Ion Pillat, both of whom gravitated around the neo-traditionalist publication Gândirea. The group also comprised poet and future far-right politician Nichifor Crainic, who blended Symbolism and Rilkean verse into radical traditionalism. N. Davidescu's rejection of his own Symbolist roots, making him an advocate of didactic poetry and the author of nostalgic prose, came together with political radicalization. Like Nae Ionescu and Crainic, Davidescu became a far-right affiliate, and eventually a supporter of fascism. This evolution also touched his image of the past: Davidescu initially demanded the revival of Symbolism as a Neoclassical tendency (an ideal stated in his polemic with Fondane during the 1920s), and, in the process of editing a 1943 anthology of fin de siècle poetry, substituted the term "Symbolist" for "Parnassian".

Symbolist aesthetics made an uncharacteristic comeback in official art under the authoritarian King Carol II, who commissioned works from Ivan Meštrović, the Croat master of Secession sculpture. During World War II, the antisemitic regime of Conducător Ion Antonescu banned the Jewish Symbolists, alongside many other Jewish writers; this approach was notably resisted by George Călinescu, whose 1941 study of Romanian literature featured ample coverage of Jewish contributions.

Over the first decades of communist rule, when the politically motivated art of Socialist Realism monopolized the cultural scene, the legacy of Symbolism was stifled and its surviving representatives were among the prime targets of official censorship. Under the unchallenged rule of Gheorghe Gheorghiu-Dej, some of the Symbolists were revisited by official criticism, their work interpreted as anti-capitalistic: Macedonski, Bacovia and Arghezi were the most visible cases. Communism also selectively banned or subjected to ridicule some of the more committed Symbolist artists, from Kimon Loghi to Oscar Späthe.

The age of liberalization, coinciding with the final Gheorghiu-Dej years and the rise of Nicolae Ceaușescu, reversed the censorship trend: by the late 1960s, Symbolism had been largely recognized as part of Romania's literary and artistic heritage. With the relaxation of censorship came a general revival of modernism, which included, in some cases, the adoption of Neosymbolism. Among the Târgoviște School novelists, Radu Petrescu is believed to have participated in this trend, which also left distinct traces in the early poetry of two leading 1960s writers, Nichita Stănescu and Mircea Ivănescu. Neosymbolism, merged with traditionalist influences, was also present in the poems of Transylvanian author Valeriu Bârgău and the earliest works of Andrei Codrescu, or appeared alongside themes from existential philosophy in the verse of Mariana Filimon. Symbolist imagery was also recovered, beginning in the 1960s, through the paintings of Marin Gherasim. In formerly Romanian Bessarabia, the Moldavian SSR and later in independent Moldova, Romanian Symbolist literature was notably taken up by Aureliu Busuioc.

A generation later, the Optzeciști writers, seeking escape from communist realities, took refuge in the bookish and imaginative universe. This opened several links with the Symbolist generations, and the more evident Neosymbolist aesthetics were deduced by critical opinion in lyrical works by the Optzeciști Mircea Cărtărescu and Traian T. Coșovei. After the Romanian Revolution of 1989, several new arrivals to literature embraced Neosymbolist aesthetics. Critics have noted that this is the case of Cristian Robu-Corcan, Adela Greceanu, Angelo Mitchievici, Anca Maria Mosora and Andrei Oișteanu.
