= Carol Scrob =

Romanian poet

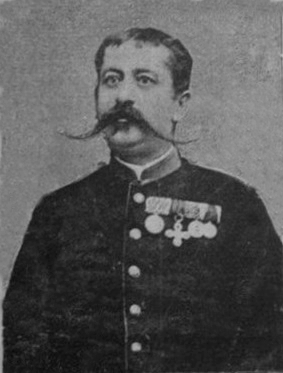

Carol Scrob (July 21, 1856 – January 17, 1913) was a Romanian poet, considered one of the figures of the native Symbolist movement. A graduate of the National College in Iași, he served time as an officer in the army, and began contributing to magazines such as "Literatorul" (1880-1884). He began publishing poetry collections in 1881, with Rime pierdute.
