= Alexandru Colorian =

Romanian poet (1896–1971)

Alexandru Colorian (March 18, 1896–October 1971) was a Romanian poet.

He was a native of Bucharest and a graduate of the University of Bucharest's law faculty. Colorian had made his literary debut in 1913, while still in high school, in Sărbătoarea eroilor magazine, which he edited with several classmates under the guidance of Eugeniu Sperantia. From 1924 to 1929, he edited Îndreptarea newspaper. Among the magazines that published his work were Versuri și proză, Vieața Nouă, Universul literar, Tribuna avocaților, Lumea militară and Decalog. In 1968, he published an anthology of Vieața Nouă poets. He was responsible for several editions of Mihai Eminescu's work (Poezii, 1940; Poezii postume, with Al. Iacobescu, 1940; Proză literară, 1943), which he accompanied with introductory studies. His short collections of verse included Simple fantezii pentru toamnă (1926), Preludii în zori (1928), 1917. Poeme de război (1936), Inscripții pentru Balcic (1937), Exil (1938) and Stampe italice (1939).

== Bibliography ==
- Simple fantezii pentru toamnă, Bucharest, 1926
- Preludii în zori, Bucharest, 1928
- 1917. Poeme de război, Bucharest, 1936
- Inscripţii pentru Balcic, Bucharest, 1937
- Exil, Bucharest, 1938
- Stampe italice, Bucharest, 1939
- Poema eternă, Bucharest, 1941
- Poeme alese, Bucharest, 1942
- Poeme. Medalioane lirice, Bucharest, 1968
