= Mihail Simonidi =

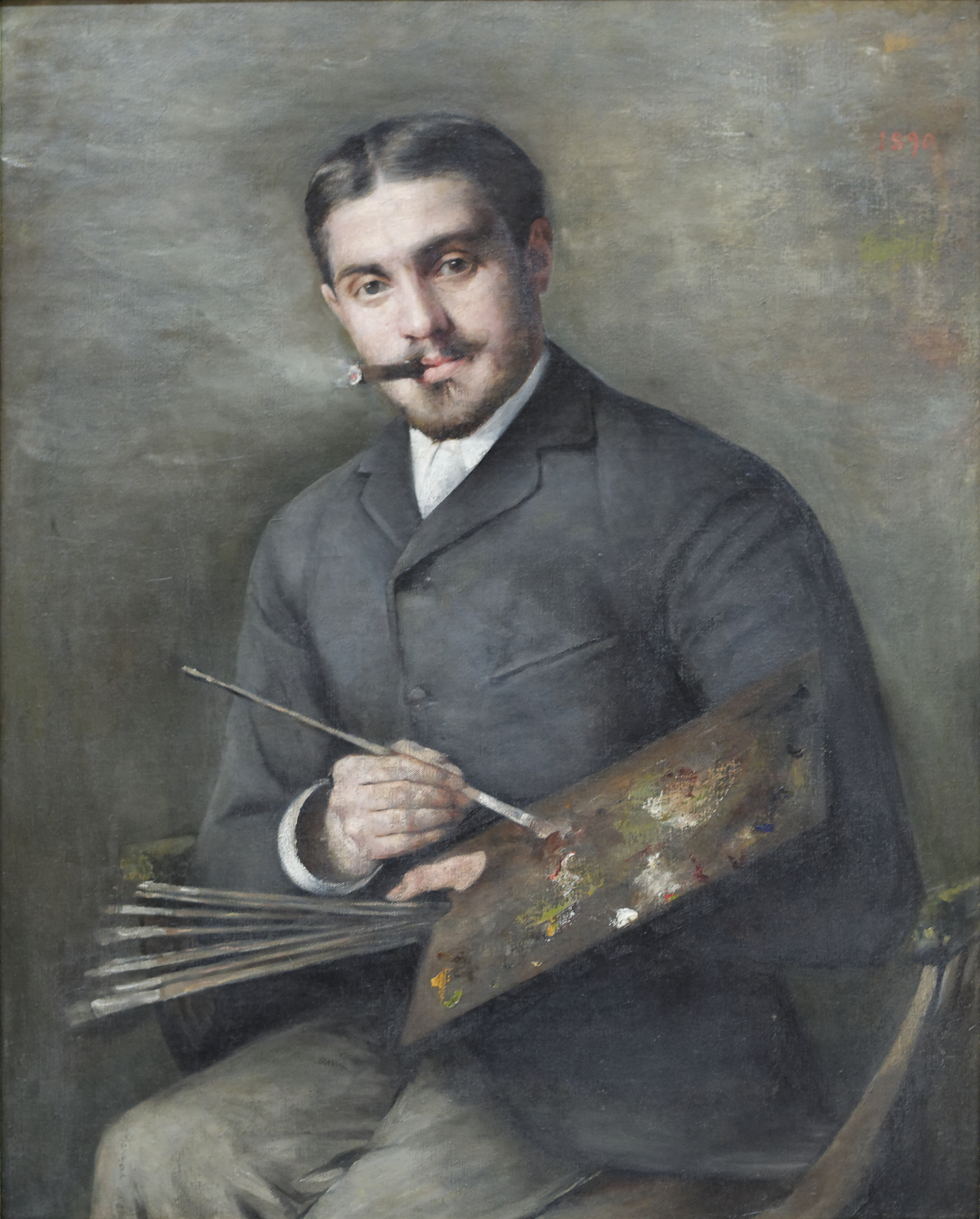
Mihail Simonidi; portrait by Constantin Pascali (1890)

Mihail Simonidi or, in French, Michel Simonidy (8 March 1870, Bucharest – 7 February 1933, Paris) was a Romanian painter, designer and decorator of Greek descent who worked in the Art Nouveau style.

== Biography ==
He came from a Greek family that had settled in Muntenia and was originally named Menelas Simonides.

In Paris, he was a pupil of Léon Bonnat and Gabriel Ferrier and was best known for his genre scenes and nudes. He received an honorable mention at the Exposition Universelle (1889). His "Death of Mithridates" also won a medal at the Salon, where he exhibited from 1908 to 1912.

As did most of those who worked in the Art Nouveau style, he designed numerous posters, including advertising for Braun-Clément & Cie. (photographers) and Le Figaro as well as one for a performance of Théodora by Victorien Sardou, starring Sarah Bernhardt. He occasionally collaborated with Jean de Paleologu (known as "Pal").

He returned to Romania intermittently to do interiors. His best-known work involved decorations for the Hall of Honor and the ceiling of the boardroom at the CEC Palace, designed by the French architect, Paul Gottereau. The ceiling depicts Fortuna and the Romanians following the War of Independence. A study for the mural won a silver medal at the Exposition Universelle (1900).

His portraits of King Carol I and Queen Elisabeth were destroyed by the Communist régime. In 2004, the contents of his studio were auctioned off at the Hôtel Drouot.

== Selected works ==
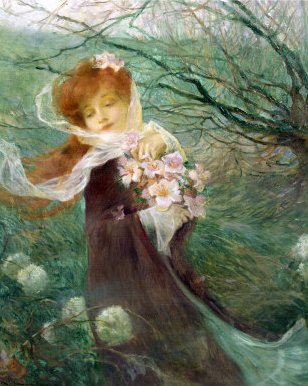
Winter Perfume

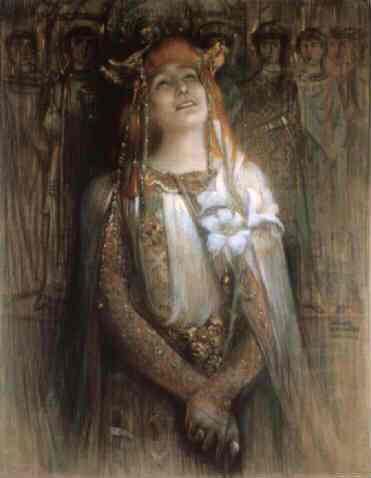
Sarah Bernhardt as Théodora

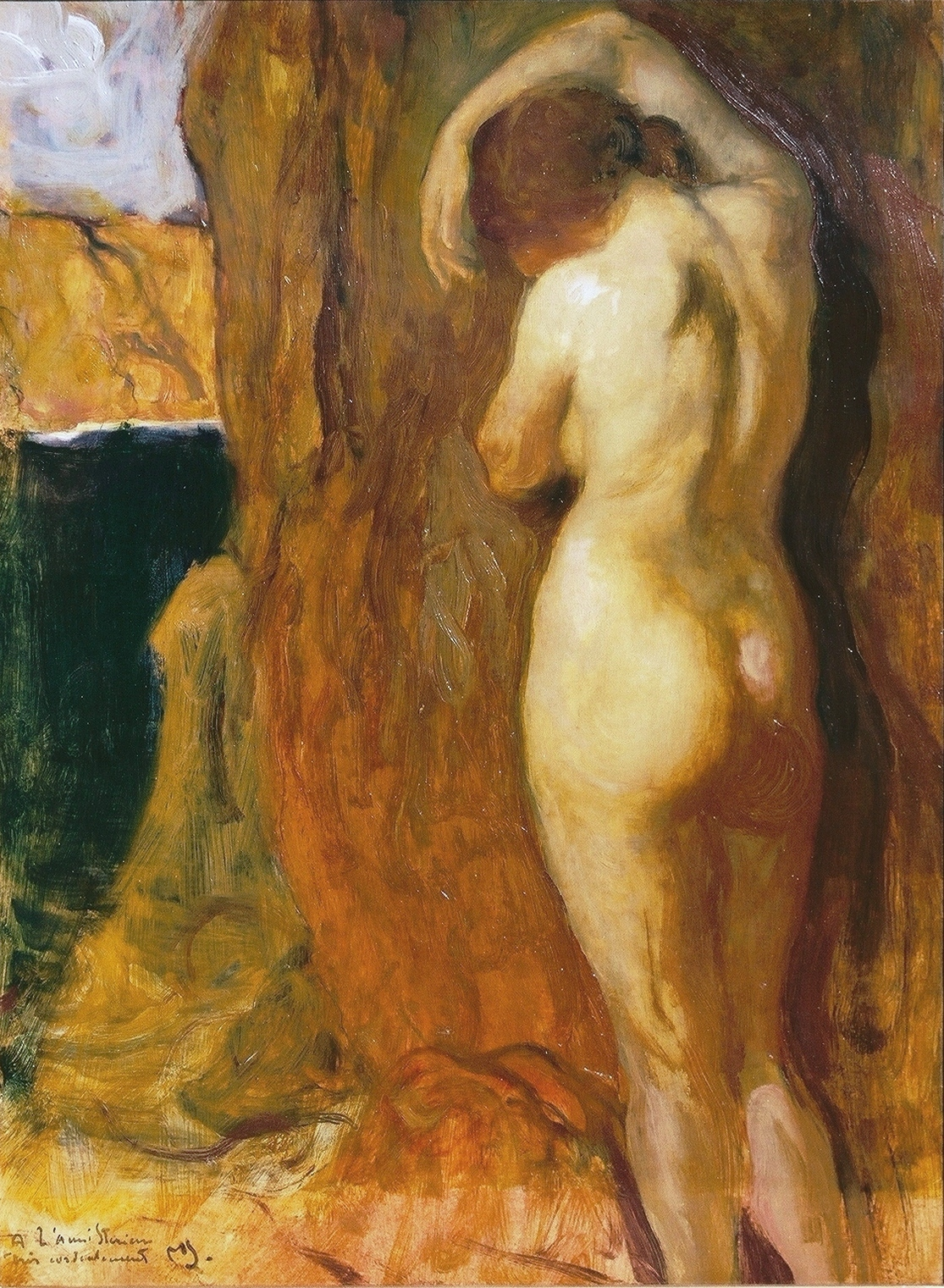
Nude Leaning
Against a Rock

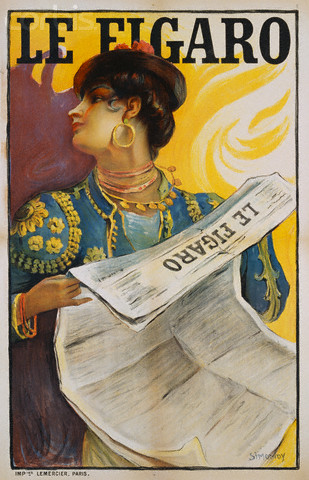
Poster for Le Figaro

== Sources ==
- Tudor Octavian, Pictori români uitați (Forgotten Romanian Painters), Noi media print, 2003, pg.73 ISBN 973-79590-2-7
- Michel Simonidy: 1872-1933 : album, I. C. Advertising, 2006 ISBN 973-00467-8-6
- Gabriel Badea-Păun, Pictori romani in Franta 1834-1939, Noi Media Print, 2012, pgs.240-245 ISBN 606-5720-14-3
