= Academia Bârlădeană =

The Academia Bârlădeană (Academy of Bârlad) was a cultural society, founded on May 1, 1915, in the city of Bârlad (Tutova County) - at present Vaslui County - by George Tutoveanu, Toma Chiricuţă and Tudor Pamfile.

== Background ==
After the unification of the Romanian principalities cultural activities started developing in the city of Bârlad, exceeding in importance the ones of other provincial cities of Romania. Important cultural magazines and newspapers were published in the city such as:

- Semănătorul, established on September 27, 1870, by Ion Popescu and Ştefan Neagoe. The magazine continued to appear until 1876;
- Paloda, established on February 5, 1881, by Ştefan Neagoe. The magazine appeared until 1908.
- Legalitatea (1882–1884);
- Progresul (1883–1885);
- Tutova (1884–1892).
- George Lazăr established on April 15, 1887, by Solomon Haliţă and edited by G. Constantinescu Râmniceanu, Gheorghe Ghibănescu, Gavril Onişor, V.G. Diaconescu and L. Apostolescu.
- Bârladul established on July 20, 1887, by Solomon Haliţă and Gheorghe Ghibănescu
- Făt Frumos established March 15, 1904, edited until May 15, 1906, by George Tutoveanu and in 1909 by Emil Gârleanu

== Establishment of the academy ==
The Academia Bârlădeană was founded on May 1, 1915, in the city of Bârlad (Tutova County) - at present Vaslui County - by George Tutoveanu, Toma Chiricuţă and Tudor Pamfile. The scope of the academy, was to hold meetings where literary works were to be presented and discussed, to organize lectures on literary subjects, to publish literary magazines and to promote culture in the rural areas.

== Activities of the academy ==
The meetings of the Academy were organized weekly. During World War I, when Wallachia was occupied by German forces and many intellectuals had fled to Moldavia, a second literary soiree was held on Thursdays, under the chairmanship of Alexandru Vlahuţă, in the house of professor Eugeniu Bulbuc, where Vlahuţă was temporarily lodged as refugee.

In the 1920s and 1930s the activities of the academy were extended.

The meetings of the academy were attended by intellectuals from Bârlad and from other Romanian cities. Poets such as Vasile Voiculescu, Ion Barbu and George Bacovia read some of their poems at these meetings.

The regular presence Iuliu and Virgil Niţulescu, physicians, G. Alexandrescu, professor at the Gheorghe Lazăr High School in Bucharest, C. Gruia, professor at the Normal School in Ploieşti, M. Rădulescu, professor at the High School in Buzău is to be mentioned. Other persons attending the meeting were Donar Munteanu, Victor Ion Popa, Vasile Voiculescu, Mihai Lungeanu, I.M. Raşcu, I. Valerian, Petru Cancel, captain Iulian Popovici, captain G. Alexandrescu, Mihai Lupescu, Natalia Paşa, George Pallady, G.M. Vlădescu, George Ponetti, C.R. Crişan, Virgil Duiculescu, Dr. Isac Veinfeld (Ion Palodă) and N. Bogescu. The academy also tried to attract younger intellectuals. The new generation was represented by George Nedelea, Vasile Damaschin, Ştefan Cosma, G.G. Ursu, George Damaschin, Cicerone Mucenic, M. Panaite, Constantin Rânzescu, G. Ioniţă, Paul Viscocil, Emil Tudor, Constantin Dimoftache Zeletin. Less active were other members were Nichifor Crainic, Pamfil Şeicaru, Atanasie Mândru, Gheorghe Tașcă, Ion Buzdugan, V. Savel, Gr. Veja, N.N. Lenguceanu, C. Z. Buzdugan, I. Pajură, N. Lupu, Aurel Balaban, Zoe C. Frasin, Ion Vicol and Marieta Creangă.

Among the lecturers who presented their views to the academy the most important were George Tutoveanu, Victor Ion Popa, G.G. Ursu, Mircea Pavelescu, George Pallady, Ionel Teodoreanu, Anastasie Mândru, Tudor Vianu and Ioan A. Bassarabescu.

Literary meetings were also organized in other Romanian cities such as Tecuci and Bălţi (now in the Republic of Moldova). The academy also organized meetings in rural areas such as the villages of Pochidia (at the estate of Gheorghe Tașcă), Zorleni, Unţeşti, Gohor, Barcea and Iveşti.

The Academy published the following magazines and newspapers:

- Florile Dalbe – published from January 1 to December 15, 1919, the editorial committee including George Tutoveanu, Vasile Voiculescu, Tudor Pamfile and Mihai Lungeanu.
- Graiul Nostru – published from April 1925 to December 1927.
- Scrisul Nostru – published from January 1929 to October 1931, sub direcţia lui George Tutoveanu
- Moldova – published from January 2, 1931, to June 15, 1932.

The activities of the academy were discontinued at the beginning of World War II. The academy was disestablished when the Communist Party took power.

== Reestablishment of the academy ==
After the Romanian Revolution of 1989 the Academia Bârlădeană was reestablished. The present honorary chairman is Professor doctor C.D. Zeletin and the acting chairman Professor doctor Mona Elena Diaconu.
