= Donar Munteanu =

Romanian poet (1886–1972)

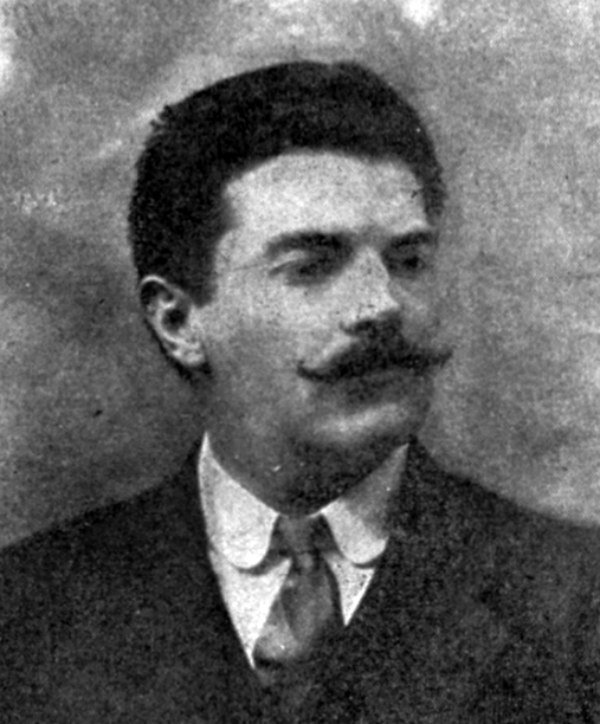
- Donar Munteanu in 1912
- Born: Dimitrie Munteanu; June 26, 1886; Răcari, Dâmbovița County, Kingdom of Romania
- Died: 1972 (aged 85 or 86); Bucharest, Communist Romania
- Occupations: Judge, prosecutor, journalist, activist, translator
- Writing career
- Period: c. 1901–1968
- Genres: Lyric poetry, sonnet, sketch story, memoir
- Literary movement: Symbolism (Romanian); Literatorul; Neo-romanticism; Convorbiri Critice; Gândirea

Donar Munteanu (born Dimitrie Munteanu; June 26, 1886 – 1972) was a Romanian poet, representing the provincial wing of Romanian Symbolism, Convorbiri Critice circle and, later, the Gândirea literary movement. He was originally a disciple and close friend of the Symbolist doyen, Alexandru Macedonski; one of the few youngsters to remain by Macedonski's side into the 1910s, he witnessed first-hand the various literary controversies of the Belle Époque. He completed studies in law at the University of Bucharest, and drew public attention as an activist and journalist, supporting political and social causes dear to Romanian nationalism. Generally considered a good, but not great, author, from his thirties and into old age Munteanu belonged to the devotional school of Orthodox-Church writers, producing mostly sonnets.

Professionally, Munteanu was active as a magistrate, a career which allowed him to visit the country; he was involved in quelling socialist agitation at Piatra Neamț and Iași, and was active a military prosecutor in the context of World War I. After the establishment of Greater Romania, Munteanu was sent to Sibiu in Transylvania, earning the admiration of new Romanian citizens. He was then dispatched to Bessarabia, and participated in the literary life of that province. In the late 1930s, he was appointed inspector of penitentiaries, and came to advocate prison reform. He maintained this post upon the proclamation of an authoritarian constitution, but was expelled shortly after; he was instead made a member of the Legislative Council, serving as such for the duration of World War II. He withdrew from public life following the establishment of Romanian communist regime, and, despite a resurgence of interest in the late 1960s (when he published memoirs of his Macedonskain youth), remains largely forgotten.

== Macedonskian debut ==
Born in Răcari, Dâmbovița County, Munteanu was of Transylvanian roots—his paternal family originated in the Apuseni Mountains. His father Ilie, a schoolteacher, was a first-generation immigrant to the Kingdom of Romania. In 1901, Dimitrie-Donar had enlisted at Gheorghe Lazăr National College in Bucharest, and had completed (but not yet published) a notebook of poems, as well as translations from Victor Hugo. One of his schoolmates encouraged him to have these reviewed by the senior poet Alexandru Macedonski, who had established a Symbolist literary circle, Literatorul (Munteanu recalls having already met Macedonski in his childhood, though he could not remember when and under what circumstances). He approached the Symbolist doyen "at sunset, after a hot day in late August [1901]", joining him on a walk down Știrbei Vodă Street. Macedonski invited him into his residence, which was then located on Sculpturii Street, Cotroceni.

Munteanu soon began attending regularly. As he noted in his old-age memoirs, in 1901 Macedonski only had one other disciple, Constantin Cantilli (who seemed to be going through a "depressive state"); the circle had lost Tudor Arghezi (who had taken monastic orders), Ștefan Petică (who was facing extreme poverty, and therefore had to take up various kinds of employment), and Cincinat Pavelescu (who was working as a magistrate in the provinces). Munteanu recalls that other inductees were being considered, including a very young Vasile Voiculescu—who, although warmly invited by Macedonski, never appeared at the Sculpturii Street salon. Scholar Victor Durnea notes that Munteanu only became a Macedonskian by chance, since his "origin, temperament and experiences" made him resemble the traditionalists at Sămănătorul. Durnea believes that Munteanu was never a Symbolist of any kind, and includes him among the Neo-romantics; he also observes that Munteanu's pastoral poems are directly modeled on traditionalist works by George Coșbuc. Macedonski held Munteanu in high esteem as "a lofty poet" and "incomparable maestro", but, according to literary historian George Călinescu, this should not dissuade from the fact that Munteanu was a "minuscule" voice in literature.

Munteanu made his publishing debut in Macedonski's Forța Morală on October 28, 1901, with a lyrical eulogy honoring scholar V. A. Urechia. He also contributed several sketch stories, including one which showed destitute and overworked peasants immolating their exploitative landlord. Though he later acknowledged that the work was "utterly unremarkable", it was well-liked by a leftist theoretician, Panait Mușoiu, who reprinted it in his own journal, Revista Ideei, and who later kept himself informed about Munteanu's evolution as a writer. Having officially joined Literatorul, Munteanu had to satisfy Macedonski's particular and contradictory demands from his pupils. He took up cycling (with Cantilli as his guide) and tobacco-smoking; a close friend of the family, he briefly tutored Macedonski's youngest son, Dinu. Meanwhile, he completed his secondary education: biographers indicate that he was a graduate of Saint Sava National College, though he himself confessed to have withdrawn from regular school, and to have passed his final exams "in private". He had been pushed to do so by Macedonski, who believed that aspiring poets should be unrestrained and unschooled.

During his period with Forța Morală, Munteanu was a personal witness to the feud between his master and the satirist Ion Luca Caragiale, which ended with the former's disgrace and near-complete isolation. During the height of this conflict, he attended a conference at which the sickly Macedonki was being heckled by a crowd of Caragiale supporters, including Alexandru Cazaban. Munteanu's own work was hosted in Caion's Românul Literar, though he came to resent Caion, who had stoked the dispute by resorting to a literary forgery, without informing Macedonski of this ruse. Munteanu also noted that, in the midst of the scandal, and while beset by financial troubles that prevented him from properly heating his home, Macedonski still managed to create his "masterpiece" poem, the "unique work" known as Noaptea de decemvrie. He remained in contact with the Macedonskis after they had moved to a "less presentable home" on Precupeții Vechi Street (near Obor). He was present at Literatorul as the circle acquired another young affiliate, George Bacovia—whom Munteanu himself recognized as a more celebrated and impactful writer.

Munteanu eventually enlisted at Bucharest University's faculty of law, taking his degree in 1909. He was a member of the Pahuci student fraternity, inviting Macedonski to its sessions. In 1904, he published the Symbolist magazine Pleiada, which ran for somewhere between two and four editions, usually signing his pieces there as Donar. He later admitted to having lied about it being put out by a committee, reporting that he had entirely self-published the magazine, and that he could not even remember where the money came from. During its brief existence, Pleiada maintained a cult of the early-19th-century poet Alexandru Depărățeanu. This impressed a local politician, Constantin Dissescu, who was active in Depărățeanu's Teleorman County; upon Dissescu's invitation, Munteanu, Macedonski and Mircea Demetriad traveled to Trivalea, where they hosted a literary festivity honoring Depărățeanu.

== Convorbiri Critice period and World War I ==
By October 1905, "Munteanu-Donar, a law student, poet and journalist" was active on the youth side of the Romanian nationalist movement. At that stage, Cultul Artei society hosted his lectures on the Orthodox church and its role in education; he asserted that these factors had historically shielded "our nation from the [foreign] torrent that had been unleashed on it". In July 1906, at a peak in the Macedonian Struggle—in which pro-Romanian Aromanians had found themselves entangled in a violent conflict with Greek activists—Munteanu appeared at a student rally, calling for a Romanian mobilization in support of the Aromanians, alleging that these risked being exterminated. In August, he was leading the students' delegation to the Bucharest Jubilee Exhibit, wherein he welcomed similar delegations of Romanians from Transylvania and the Duchy of Bukovina, as well as Aromanian envoys.

A regular at Mihail Dragomirescu's Convorbiri Critice magazine (from 1907), Munteanu was introduced by his new mentor an "idyllic poet from the Macedonski school". Dragomirescu also proposed that his piece Țiganii ("The Gipsies") should be considered "a descriptive, colorful, masterpiece". Published in May 1907, the poem was explained by Donar himself as a sample of "my wandering soul." Munteanu was also co-opted by Ion Minulescu at the radical Symbolist review, Revista Celor L'alți. His contribution there was noted by the anti-Symbolist traditionalist Nicolae Iorga, who believed Munteanu to be "a good versifier". The episode strained relations between Dragomirescu and Munteanu, since the former was being attacked by Minulescu. In April 1908, Munteanu wrote to apologize, and noted that, by then, he had already decided to end his collaboration with Revista Celor L'alți. In May, he joined the Convorbiri Critice editorial committee, which, by then, also comprised Pavelescu, I. Dragoslav, Emil Gârleanu, A. de Herz, Eugen Lovinescu, Anastasie Mândru, and Corneliu Moldovanu. The group's editorial cartoonist was Iosif Iser, who once drew and published Munteanu's portrait.

In April 1909, Munteanu reaffirmed his intellectual debt to Symbolism, the "new poetry", in a conference he held at the Romanian Atheneum of Bucharest. After a "long and tiresome" administrative trip through Northern Dobruja, which he considered retelling as a novel, he began collecting his own poetry into one "tiny volume", Aripi negre ("Black Wings")—also printed in 1909. At the time, he was a prosecutor in training at Piatra Neamț. In this capacity, he represented the country's Public Ministry at the September 1909 trial of forestry entrepreneurs Alecu Șoarec and M. Sufrin, found guilty of having defrauded the state. While he remained close to Dragomirescu, for whom he maintained "an unbound intellectual sympathy", Munteanu eventually moved on. From 1911 to 1916, he was a contributor to Flacăra, a magazine which nevertheless poked fun at his unbearably long-winded speech to the Romanian Writers' Society (November 1911). Munteanu still continued to be active as a public speaker, and in January 1912 was again billed at the Atheneum, to lecture on the importance of idealism.

Munteanu maintained his posting as junior prosecutor in Piatra Neamț, where he had to keep in check the emergence of rebellious socialist groups. In mid-1913, a socialist laborer named Hălăucescu, who had been arrested after attempting to speak at a rally, reported that Munteanu, "that soul of a poet", had ordered him to walk back to Roman alongside a Gendarmerie patrol. In 1912–1913, he acted as defender in the civil lawsuit brought up by Alexandru Nicolau against the Gendarmerie. In his plea, Munteanu alleged that Nicolau had been correctly labeled a socialist provocateur by the Gendarmes, and therefore that the lawsuit was a frivolous one. Soon after, he was moved to supervise law enforcement in the socialist hub of Iași. During December 1913, he intervened to quell street battles between right-wing students of Iași University and (largely Jewish) trade unionists affiliated with the Social Democratic Party. From April 15, 1914, he was made session judge at the same regional tribunal. In May, the city heard him conferencing on idealism. As noted by the columnist Rodion, he now sported an "English" look and had adopted witty brevity.

The outbreak of World War I saw Romania still maintaining neutrality. Munteanu was still at Iași in October 1914, representing its legal corporation at the Bucharest funeral of King Carol I. He used this occasion to reconnect with the Macedonskis, and in particular with Alexandru's son and grandson, Alexis and Soare, picnicking with them on an inner-city meadow. Munteanu then had a stint as a magistrate at Bazargic, Southern Dobruja. By July 1916, he had been moved to the tribunal of neighboring Caliacra, again as a prosecutor. Munteanu's activity in literature was then perturbed by Romania's entry into the war and massive defeats which closely followed this event. In 1916–1917, he was in Bârlad as a military prosecutor, visiting with Alexandru Vlahuță and joining the literary club known as Academia Bârlădeană, also frequented by Voiculescu, George Tutoveanu, and Victor Ion Popa. He had begun writing religious-themed poems such as Golgota, which Vlahuță reportedly asked him to recite at every Academia meeting, and more specifically his first sonnets.

== Interwar and later life ==
By 1919, Munteanu had been attached to the 7th Division of the Romanian Land Forces, and also performing civilian duties in Câmpulung; in July of that year, he was royal prosecutor at the trial of Hungarian academic István Apáthy, accused of "conspiracy against Romanian citizens" during the war over Transylvania. In January 1920, he accepted a new assignment as examining magistrate in Brăila. As he himself reported, this office was highly demanding, and his new duties prevented him from reconnecting with Macedonski, who was dying in Bucharest. He still attended and spoke at the funeral, held in late 1920—he later described an "embarrassing" scene at the grave-site, which included a confrontation between Alexis and Octavian Goga.

Later in the interwar, Munteanu continued to move around the enlarged country, being assigned as a first-level prosecutor at the tribunal of Sibiu, in Transylvania. He served there until mid-February 1922, when, as an adversary of the governing National Liberal Party, he was dismissed. His ouster sparked a public protest from the local chapter of the Romanian National Party, which supported a degree of regional autonomy in Transylvania; its members contended that Munteanu, though a non-Transylvanian, had run afoul of a centralizing political machine, which did not care about his qualifications or his proven decency. Munteanu was moved to Odorhei, then Deva, and ultimately left Transylvania for Bessarabia, serving at Chișinău. During his extended stay there, Munteanu began contributing to the literary review Teatrul, put out by his Convorbiri Critice colleague, Pavelescu, and also had samples of his work featured in Transylvania's Gândirea (from 1930). Other poems appeared in the leading magazine of his adoptive region, namely Viața Basarabiei. In 1931, Munteanu married the Bessarabian Maria Niță, a teacher of Russian.

In 1925, Munteanu had issued the poetry volume Aripi fantastice, which was largely a reprint of Aripi negre. Here and in the few books that he published at significant intervals (Simfonia vieții, 1943; Bisericuța neamului, 1943), Neo-romantic echoes are found alongside Symbolist motifs, while, critic Rodica Zafiu notes, well-drawn images are eclipsed by an ample tendency toward grandiloquence. These volumes also outline Munteanu's philosophical vision, dividing his poetry into stages of life: a bucolic childhood, an intense youth "in the proximity of genius", a pensive maturity, and, lastly, a return to childhood themes—but with an added flavor of Christian revelations. Durnea reserves some praise for his love poetry (illustrating the second stage, and evoking Dimitrie Anghel's verse), as well as for Munteanu's poetic homage to his master Macedonski, which has intertextual allusions to several of Macedonski's own poems. His sonnets, reviewer Ion Șiugariu notes, were conventional and prosaic, echoing both Sămănătorul and Parnassianism; although not "a great poet", Munteanu was "earnest", without the "obscurities" of modernist literature. According to Durnea, Munteanu was commendable for his Bisericuța neamului, which honored "that ancient peasant piety", including by reworking religious motifs found in Romanian folklore.

On February 5, 1937, Justice Minister Mircea Djuvara made Munteanu his general director of penitentiaries. Upon being sworn in, he announced that his main focus was on prison reform. He was kept on to 1938, by which time he was answering to Minister Vasile P. Sassu. He was on hand to investigate the July 1937 prison riots at Târgu Ocna. During October of that year, Munteanu and his subordinate Octav Gorăscu were putting out Revista pentru Moralizarea și Instruirea Deținuților ("The Magazine for Detainee Moral Uplift and Instruction"), which featured some of his own poems. Before Easter 1938, the two men, alongside warden L. Giurelly, launched a public charity collecting funds for the reformed inmates of Văcărești Prison.

At the same time, the introduction of an authoritarian regime, codified under the 1938 constitution, also led to procedural revision and to the death penalty being reintroduced. Before May 1938, Munteanu was assigned to the special panel of magistrates which oversaw this process. On July 7, however, he was stripped of his position at the directorate, and reemployed as a regular magistrate. A week later, he went public with accusations against Gorăscu, with prosecutors stepping in to investigate his claims. Munteanu eventually served as a Permanent Councilor to the Legislative Council, being sworn in on August 13. From the 1930s, Munteanu and Șerban Bascovici had been the two Symbolists turning to Christian-themed poetry, and were vacationing together at the "writers' home" in Bușteni. As noted by literary historian Dumitru Micu, Munteanu's poetry was by then "within the dogmatic canons of Orthodoxy", which represented the core vision of Gândirea. Such dogmatism, Micu argues, was only maintained by the group's "second-rate" poets: Munteanu, Sandu Tudor, and George Gregorian.

Munteanu was at the Legislative Council throughout World War II and until June 1945, when he was ordered to retire. He survived the establishment of a Romanian communist regime, and, in 1956, was visiting fellow poet Dumitru Iov at his home in Bucharest. By 1965, he was living on Ștefan Furtună Alley, which was close to Macedonski's former townhouse in Cotroceni; he had begun work on a volume of memoirs "about Alexandru Macedonski, about other poets, and about myself"—samples of which appeared in the 1968 edition of Iașul Literar magazine. The fragment had been edited by comparatist Adrian Marino, to whom Munteanu had sent the whole "voluminous manuscript". Also in 1968, a critical edition of Munteanu's poetic works was being considered by the a state-run publishing house, Editura pentru Literatură. Munteanu died in Bucharest in 1972. Some two years later, fellow Symbolist Barbu Solacolu suggested revisiting Munteanu's work, but later critics noted that Munteanu, "quite unfamiliar" or "downright forgotten" as a writer, "is confined to literary history".
