= Florile Dalbe =

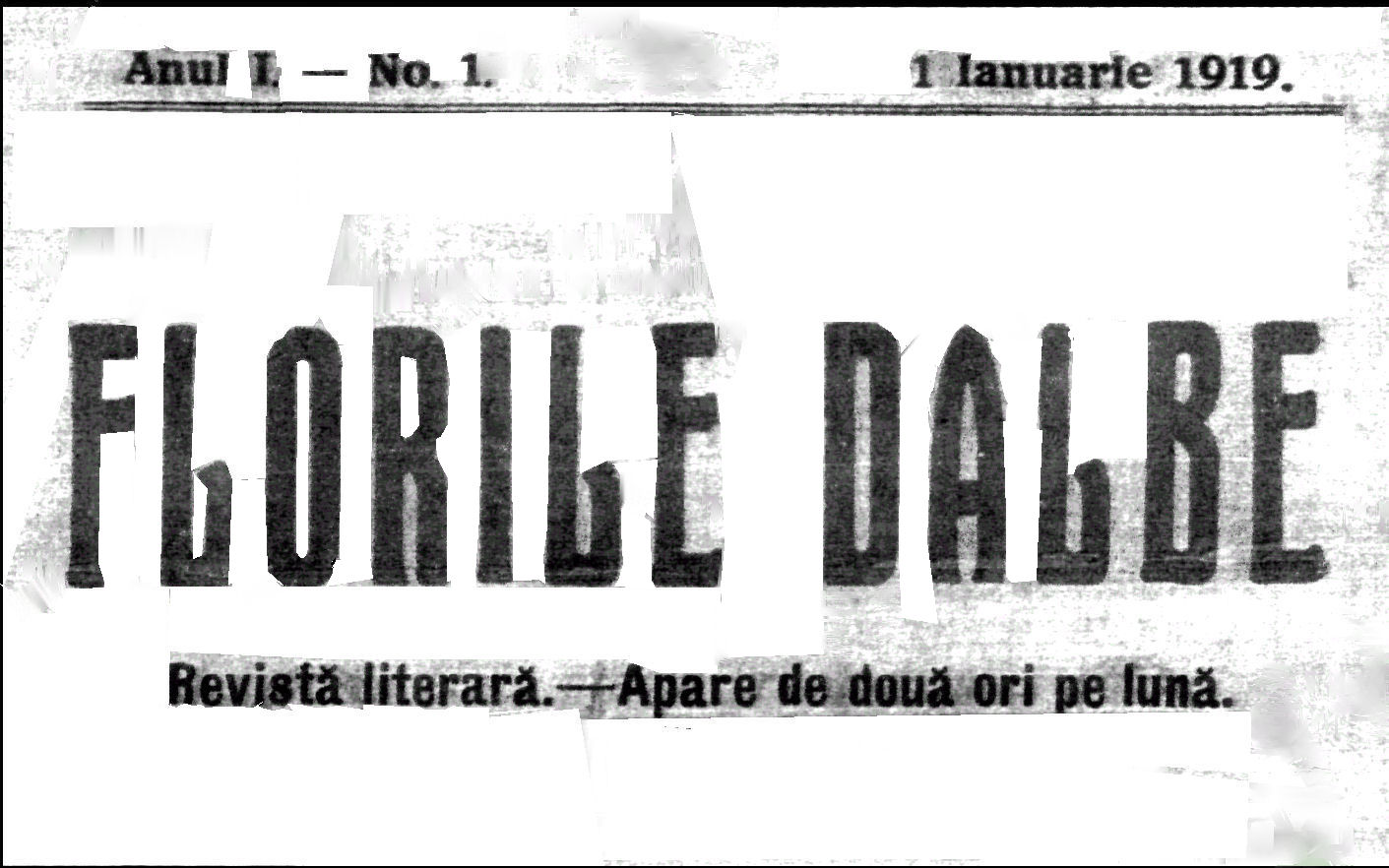
Logo of the "Florile Dalbe" magazine

Florile Dalbe was a semimonthly literary magazine published in Bârlad, Romania, by the Academia Bârlădeană". The first issue of the magazine was issued on 1 January 1919 and it appeared regularly until 15 December 1919. In total, 23 numbers were printed.

The editor in chief of the magazine was George Tutoveanu and the members of the editorial committee were Vasile Voiculescu, Tudor Pamfile and Mihail Lungeanu. Besides the contributions of the editorial committee its main contributors were D. Iov, I. U. Soricu, Nică Romanaş, Nadejda Ştirbey, Ştefan Bălceşti, I. Ojog, Ştefan Petică, Maria Ionescu, Victor Ion Popa, Corneliu Moldovanu, Emil Gârleanu, D. Nanu, I. Mândru Zoe G. Frasin, I. Pârvulescu, G. Mihail – Vlădescu, C. Medeleanu, Virgil Cârstescu, I. Valerian, Elena Emandi (wife of Theodor Emandi) and others.
