= Nostru =

Nostru may refer to:

- Graiul Nostru was a monthly literary magazine published in Bârlad, Romania by the Academia Bârlădeană.
- Scrisul Nostru was a monthly literary magazine published in Bârlad, Romania by the Academia Bârlădeană.
