= Gheorghe Lazăr (disambiguation) =

Gheorghe Lazăr (1779-1823) was a Romanian scholar.

Gheorghe Lazăr may also refer to:

- George Lazăr (magazine), published in Bârlad, Romania
- Gheorghe Lazăr, Ialomița, commune in Romania

== See also ==
- Gheorghe Lazăr National College (disambiguation), two Romanian national colleges
