= I. Valerian =

I. Valerian (born Valeriu Ionescu; August 1, 1895 – November 21, 1980) was a Romanian writer and journalist.

Born in Ivești, Galați County, the son of Fotache, a worker and clerk active in Ivești and Tecuci, and his wife Amalia, he spent his childhood in Tecuci. There he attended school at the primary and gymnasium levels before going to Vasile Alecsandri High School in Galați from 1907 to 1915. In 1917, during World War I, he graduated from the Military Reserve Officers' School in Bucharest, going on to participate in the Battle of Mărăști as part of the 2nd Army under Alexandru Averescu. Wounded on August 6, he was promoted to lieutenant and made a knight of the Order of the Crown.

Between 1917 and 1921, he recuperated at Bârlad, working together with Alexandru Vlahuță and George Tutoveanu, becoming a member of Academia Bârlădeană and making his debut with verses in Florile Dalbe. He married professor Elena Ganea in 1922, fathering five children. Moving to Bucharest in 1925, he was active in the Sburătorul circle, publishing verses in its Revista literară magazine. He joined the Romanian Writers' Society (SSR) in 1922, and in 1925 graduated from the Literature and Philosophy Faculty of the University of Bucharest, magna cum laude. His first published book, Caravanele tăcerii ("The Caravans of Silence"), appeared in 1923, and it received a prize from the Romanian Academy the following year. In 1925, he was elected a member of the Royal Romanian Geographical Society.

In February 1926, he began editing Viața Literară, which appeared almost continuously until June 1941 in 322 issues, promoting important figures in the country's cultural and literary life, as well as helping to launch the careers of younger writers. According to George Călinescu, Valerian, through this magazine and Sentinela (1939-1944), showed a wide-ranging vision in a narrow-minded era. He received positive reviews for his volume of verse Stampe (1927) and for his novel Cara Su (1936). He worked in the military teaching department of the Education Ministry from 1932 to 1937, headed the Office of Romanian Youth Education (1937-1938) and belonged to the leadership of Straja Țării.

During World War II, from 1941 to 1944, he headed a department in the press section of the Ministry of National Propaganda; he was also promoted to a leadership function within the SSR. In 1943, he remarried; his second wife was Aurelia Grigoriță Tomescu (1906-1987), who wrote under the pseudonym Grig Malciu. Sent into retirement in 1945, he was active in the voluntary association for supporting national defense (AVSAP). In 1967, he was readmitted into what the Communist regime had refashioned as the Writers' Union of Romania. He published Cu scriitorii în veac, a well-received volume based on 39 interviews with prominent Romanian writers. In 1969–1970, he released a revised version of Cara Su as well as the study Chipuri din Viața Literară. He died in 1980.
