= Tutova =

Tutova may refer to:

- Tutova, Vaslui, a commune in Vaslui County, Romania
- Tutova County, a former subdivision of Romania
- Tutova (river), a tributary of the Bârlad in Vaslui County, Romania
- Tutova (magazine), published in Bârlad, Romania
