= George Tutoveanu =

Romanian poet (1872–1957)

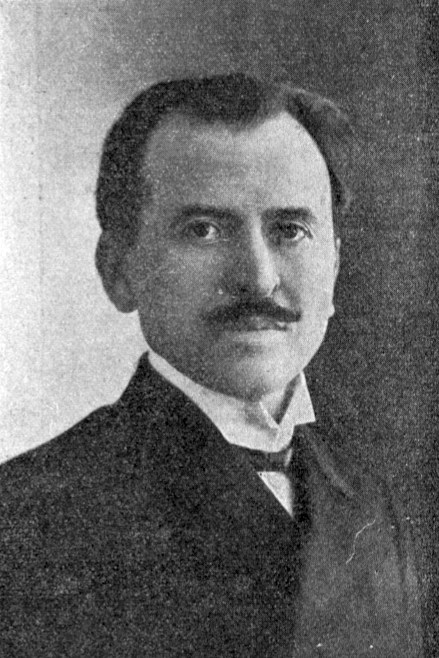
- George Tutoveanu
- Born: Gheorghe Ionescu; November 30, 1872; Bârlad, Romania
- Died: August 18, 1957 (aged 84); Bârlad, Romania
- Education: Teacher's diploma (1897)
- Occupations: Poet, teacher, editor
- Spouse: Zoe Marinescu (married 1899–1940)
- Children: [List children if available]
- Writing career
- Language: Romanian
- Period: 1887–1957
- Genre: Poetry
- Notable works: Albastru (1902), La arme (1913), Balade (1915), Patria(1924), Poezii alese (1924), Tinereță (1924), Logodnica lui Vifor (1935), Sonete (1938)
- Notable awards: Bene Merenti Order (1902)

George Tutoveanu (born Gheorghe Ionescu; 30 November 1872–18 August 1957) was a Romanian poet.

Born in Bârlad, his parents were the Romanian Orthodox church singer Gheorghe Ionescu and his wife Catinca. He had five brothers and a sister, and until school age was raised in nearby villages. He attended school in his native town and in the national capital Bucharest. There, he was drawn into socialist circles, becoming acquainted with Constantin Ion Parhon and Ștefan Petică. He also received a teacher's diploma, graduating in 1897. His first job was in Bucharest, followed by Craiova, Focșani and Fălticeni, where he befriended Mihail Sadoveanu. In 1899, he married Zoe Marinescu, who would publish poetry as Zoe G. Frasin; she was related to Ion Barbu. In 1903, he returned to Bârlad permanently, continuing to teach until his retirement in 1933. He was school inspector for Tutova County, principal of Gheorghe Roșca Codreanu High School and cultural inspector. In collaboration, he published a number of textbooks.

Signing as George G. Ionescu or G. G. I., he made his poetry debut in the Bârlad newspaper Paloda and in Bogdan Petriceicu Hasdeu's Revista nouă. His first published work appeared in 1887, the year he graduated from a local gymnasium. He took the pen name George Tutoveanu in 1898, continuing to use it for the rest of his career. A tireless promoter of culture in his birthplace, he edited a number of newspapers and magazines: Făt-Frumos (1904), together with Emil Gârleanu; Florile Dalbe (1918), with Vasile Voiculescu and Tudor Pamfile; Graiul Nostru (1925), the publication of Academia Bârlădeană; Scrisul Nostru (1925) and Moldova (1931). His work appeared in numerous periodicals, among them Convorbiri Literare, Cosânzeana, Cele trei Crișuri, Familia, Junimea literară, Însemnări literare, Literatura și arta română, Luceafărul, Noua revistă română, Paloda literară, Revista idealistă, Sămănătorul, Tânărul scriitor and Viața Românească.

He helped found several literary magazines: Ion Creangă, Miron Costin, Pagini alese, Revista modernă. A number of Bârlad institutions were founded on Tutoveanu's initiative, including the public library, Academia Bârlădeană (of which he was president) and the Mihai Eminescu cooperative library. He was among the founders of the Romanian Writers' Society in 1909 and was an active participant in the local chapter of the Cultural League for the Unity of All Romanians. During World War I, he was mobilized and sent to Yalta, where he led a troop of Romanian Scouts from Bârlad. In 1929, he joined the short-lived League against Usury. From April 1931 to May 1932, a period coinciding with Nicolae Iorga's time as prime minister, he served as Prefect of Tutova County. Among his achievements was the establishment of some fifty village libraries.

His first volume of poetry, the 1902 Albastru, received the Bene Merenti Order from the ruling House of Hohenzollern. His subsequent books were La arme (1913), Balade (1915), Patria (1924), Poezii alese (1924), Tinereță (1924), Logodnica lui Vifor (1935) and Sonete (1938). His wife died in 1940, leading him to nearly cease writing. Celebrations were held to mark Tutoveanu's 70th birthday in 1942, with an issue of Păstorul Tutovei magazine dedicated to him. In late 1943, during World War II, he temporarily sought refuge at his son's home in Bucharest, but ended up staying mainly in the surrounding countryside, due to Allied bombing. The new communist regime blacklisted his works in 1948. The following year, he married a Romanian-language teacher more concerned about party politics than with his care, and Tutoveanu dedicated a single poem to her. During his final years, he preferred to spend time in his garden. In 1972, his centenary was observed. A primary school in Bârlad has borne his name since 1995.
