= Progresul (disambiguation) =

Progresul may refer to:

- FC Progresul București, a football team set in Bucharest and formerly known as FC Naţional București

Geographic entities

- Progresul – quarter of the city of Bucharest
- Progresul – village in Botoşani County, Romania, part of the municipality of Dorohoi

Others

- Progresul (magazine) – magazine published in Bârlad, Romania
