= Semănătorul =

Semănătorul (Romanian for "The Sower") was the name of several magazines in Romania, including:

- Sămănătorul (or Semănătorul), published in Bucharest
- Semănătorul (1870–1876), published in Bârlad
