= Pârscov =

- Commune
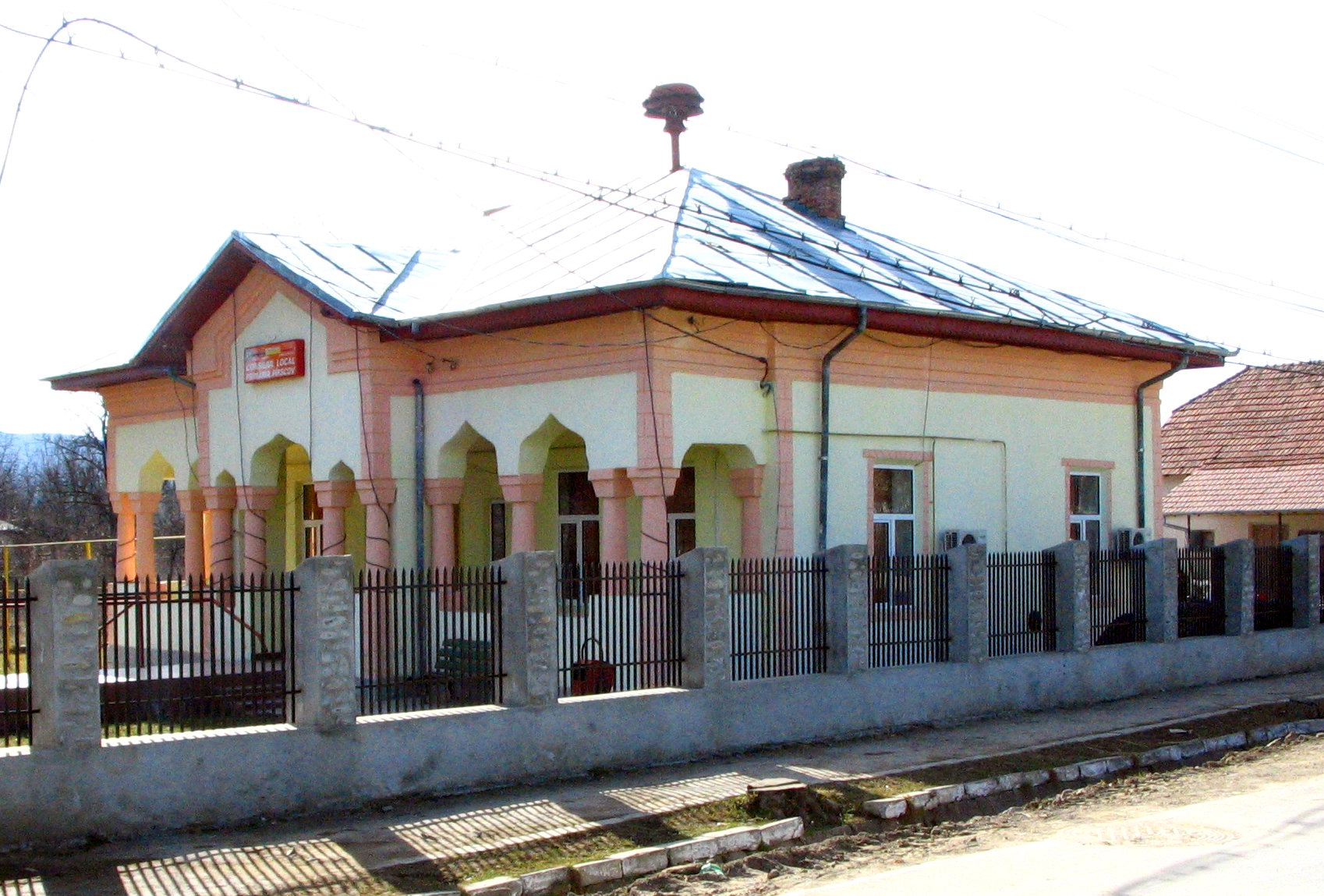
- Pârscov town hall

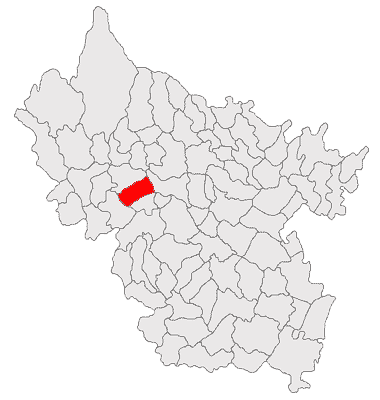
- Location in Buzău County

- Location in Romania
- Coordinates: 45°17′N 26°33′E
- Country: Romania
- County: Buzău
- Subdivisions: Bădila, Curcănești, Lunca Frumoasă, Oleșești, Pârjolești, Pârscov, Robești, Runcu, Târcov, Tocileni, Trestieni, Valea Purcarului

Government
  - Mayor (2020–2024): Daniel Mihai (PSD)
- Area: 68.14 km^{2} (26.31 sq mi)
- Elevation: 182 m (597 ft)
- Population (2021-12-01): 4,957
  - Density: 72.75/km^{2} (188.4/sq mi)
- Time zone: UTC+02:00 (EET)
  - Summer (DST): UTC+03:00 (EEST)
- Postal code: 127450
- Area code: +(40) 238
- Vehicle reg.: BZ
- Website: www.pirscov.ro

Pârscov (Romanian pronunciation: [ˈpɨrskov]) is a commune in Buzău County, Muntenia, Romania. It is composed of twelve villages: Bădila, Curcănești, Lunca Frumoasă, Oleșești, Pârjolești, Pârscov, Robești, Runcu, Târcov, Tocileni, Trestieni, and Valea Purcarului.

Pârscov is the birthplace of the Romanian poet Vasile Voiculescu.

Historical population
Year	Pop.	±%
2002	6,068	—
2011	5,654	−6.8%
2021	4,957	−12.3%
Source: Census data

== Notes ==
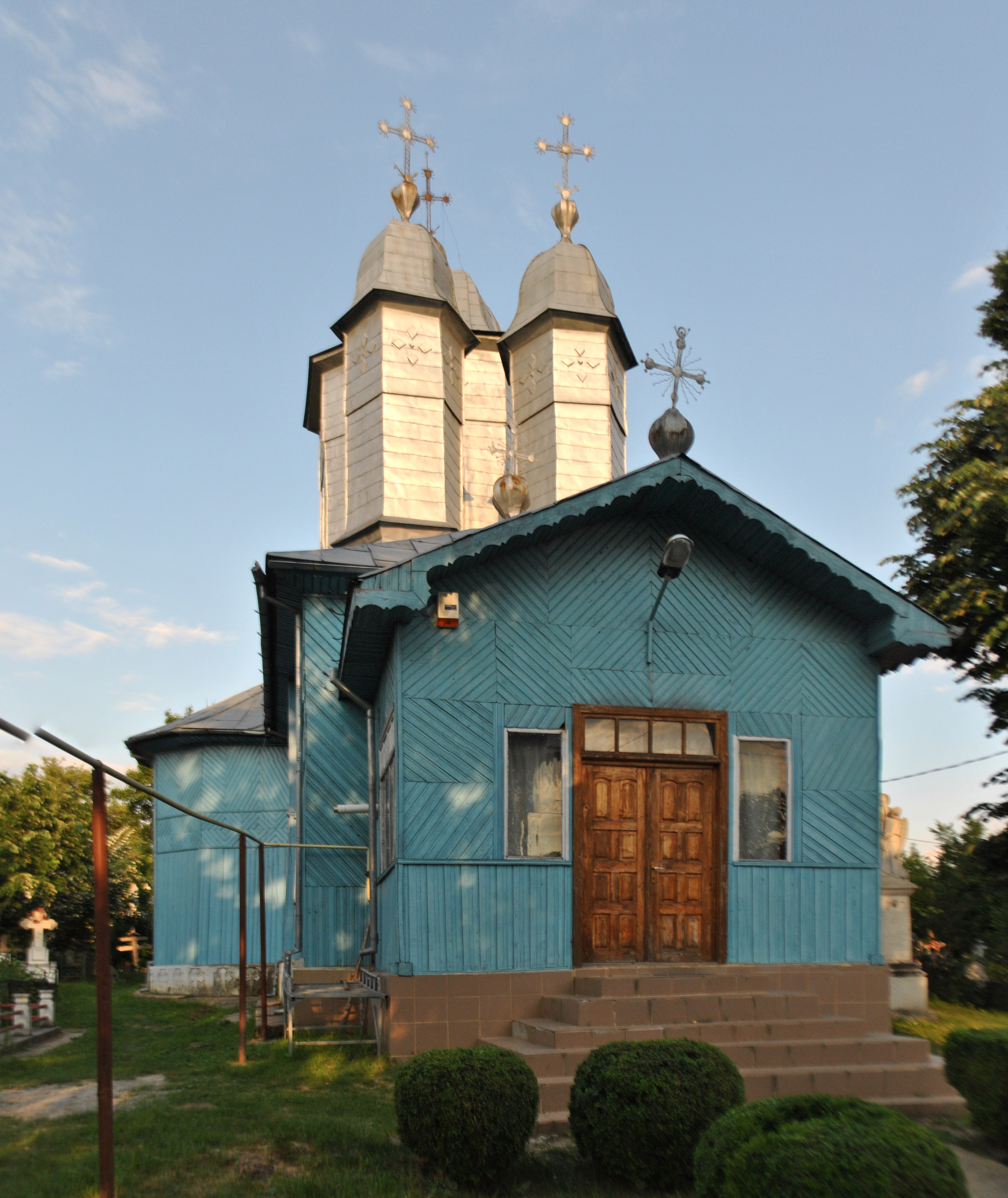
Lunca Frumoasă church
