= Moldova (newspaper) =

Defunct Romanian newspaper

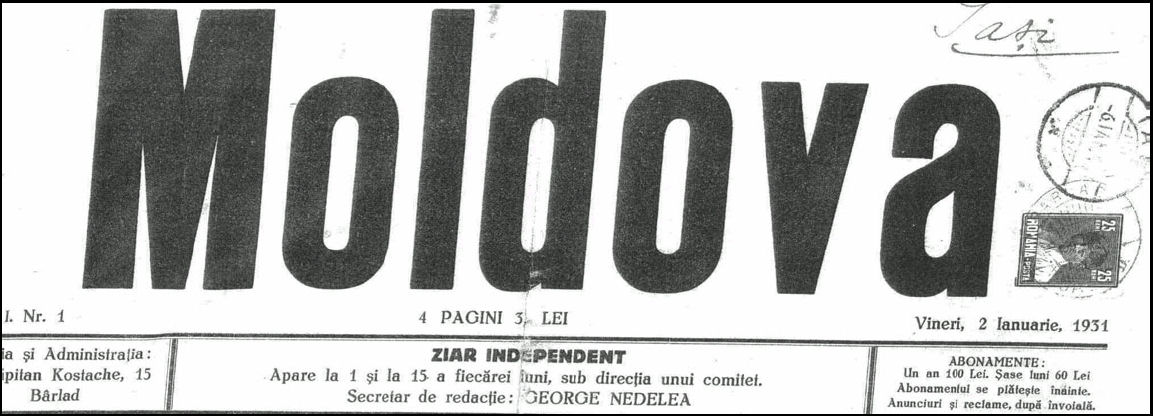
- Logo of the "Moldova" newspaper
- Frequency: semimonthly
- First issue: 2 January 1931
- Final issue: 1932
- Country: Romania
- Language: Romanian

Moldova was a semimonthly newspaper published in Bârlad, Romania.

== History ==
Though presented as being independent, the paper was published under the patronage of the "Academia Bârlădeană". The first issue of the newspaper hit the stands on 2 January 1931 and it appeared regularly until 26 December 1931. The following year, No.1-2 was published on 1 March 1932, and No.3 (the newspaper's last) on 15 June 1932.

The editor in chief of the newspaper George Nedelea and its main supporter was George Tutoveanu, at that time prefect of Tutova County. The main concern of the newspaper was the literary activity in the city of Bârlad. Besides George Tutoveanu, its main contributors were G. G. Ursu, Teodor Vlad, George Damaschin, Zoe G. Frasin, Ştefan Cosma, C.V. Slobozeanu, George Pallady, Emil Tudor, Nicolae Costăchescu and Cicerone Mucenic. Political articles were signed, among others by Ion Palodă (Isac Veinfeld), Mihai Lupescu, Marieta Creangă, and Ioan Antoniu.
