= Țepu =

- Commune
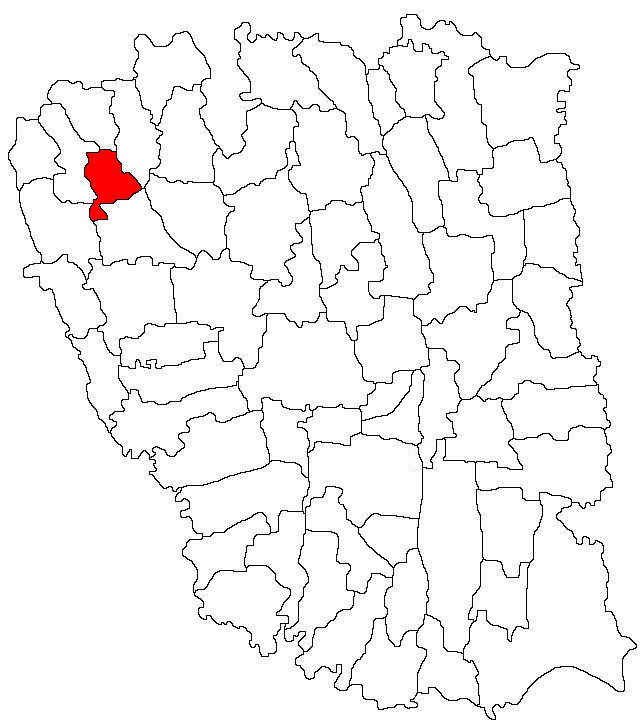
- Location in Galați County

- Location in Romania
- Coordinates: 45°58′N 27°22′E
- Country: Romania
- County: Galați
- Population (2021-12-01): 2,189
- Time zone: EET/EEST (UTC+2/+3)
- Vehicle reg.: GL

Țepu is a commune in Galați County, Western Moldavia, Romania with a population of 2,518 people. It is composed of two villages, Țepu and Țepu de Sus.

== Natives ==
- Tudor Pamfile
