= Ivești, Galați =

Ivești
- Commune
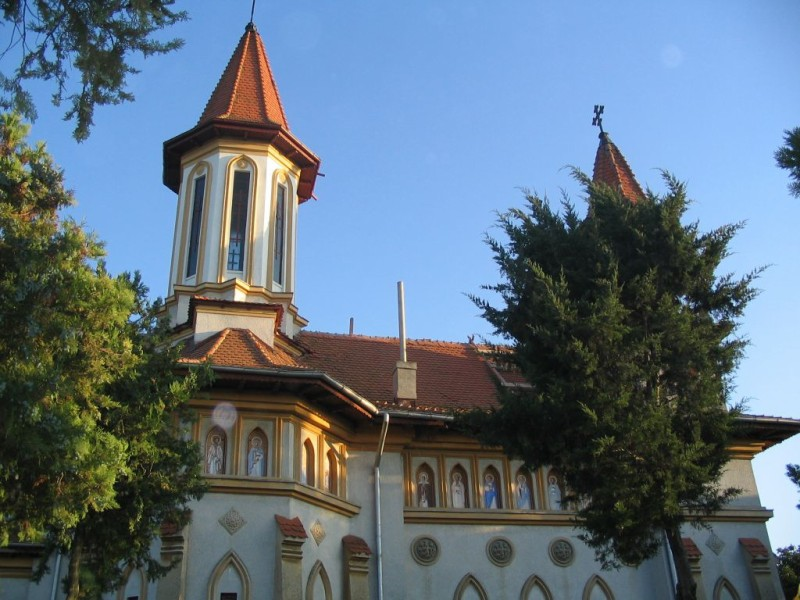
- St. George's Church in Ivești

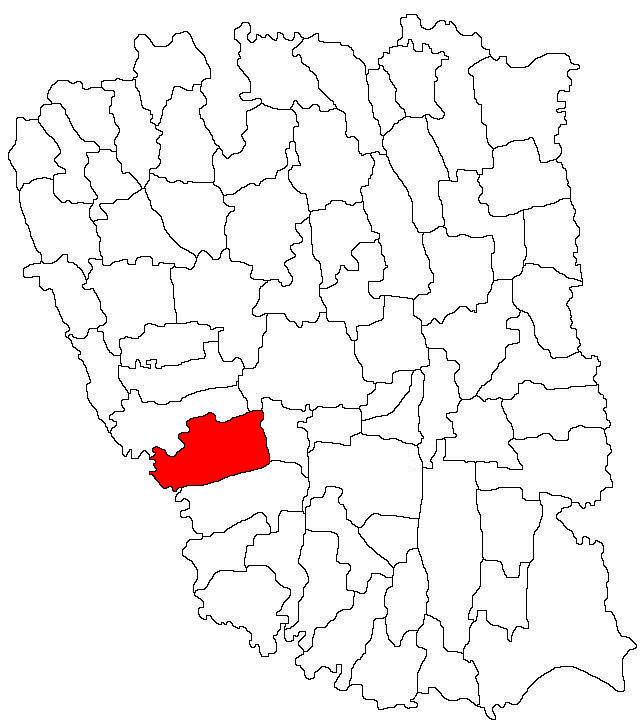
- Location in Galați County

- Location in Romania
- Coordinates: 45.6698°N 27.5435°E
- Country: Romania
- County: Galați

Government
  - Mayor (2024–2028): Maricel Gheoca (PSD)
- Area: 80.66 km^{2} (31.14 sq mi)
- Elevation: 24 m (79 ft)
- Population (2021-12-01): 9,584
  - Density: 118.8/km^{2} (307.7/sq mi)
- Time zone: UTC+02:00 (EET)
  - Summer (DST): UTC+03:00 (EEST)
- Postal code: 807170
- Area code: +(40) 236
- Vehicle reg.: GL
- Website: www.comunaivestiprimar.ro

Ivești is a commune in Galați County, Western Moldavia, Romania. It is composed of two villages, Bucești and Ivești.

== Natives ==
- Hortensia Papadat-Bengescu (1876–1955), novelist
- Ștefan Petică (1877–1904), Symbolist poet, prose writer, playwright, journalist, and Socialist activist
- I. Valerian (1895–1980), writer and journalist
