= Graiul Nostru =

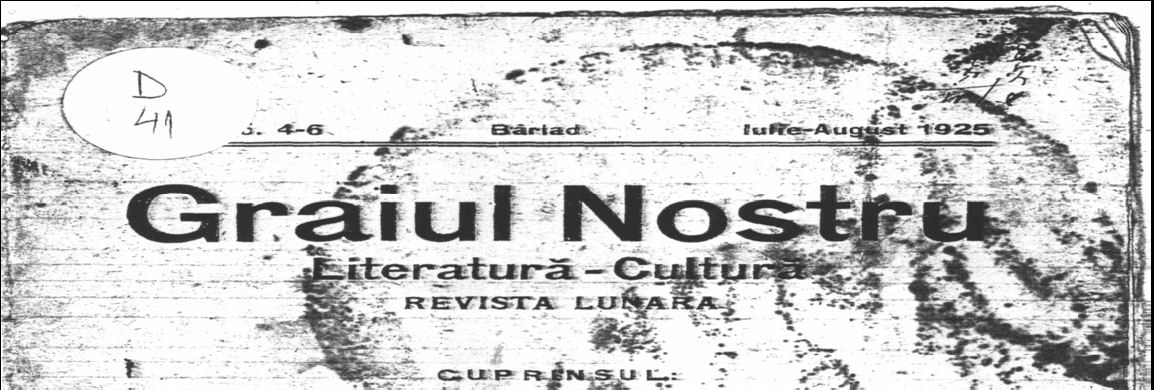
- Logo of the "Graiul Nostru" magazine
- Categories: Literary magazine
- Frequency: Monthly
- First issue: 1 April 1925
- Final issue: 1927
- Country: Romania
- Language: Romanian

Graiul Nostru was a monthly literary magazine published in Bârlad, Romania by the Academia Bârlădeană".

== History and profile ==
The first issue of the magazine was issued on 1 April 1925. It appeared for three years, the last number being for July-December 1927.

The editor in chief of the newspaper was George Tutoveanu who also wrote the editorials of each issue. Other important contributors were George Pallady, Sylvia Pan (Natalia Paşa), Virgil Duiculescu, George Ponetti (for a time also editorial secretary), Zoe G. Frasin, G.M. Vlădescu, Toma Chiricuţă, Ion Palodă (Isac Veinfeld), Victor Ion Popa, Constantin Găvan, Grigore Veja, Traian Condoiu, D. Nanu, I. Valerian, Ciprian Doicescu, Constantin Crişan, Iuliu and Virgil Niţulescu, Gheorghe Taşcă, Pamfil Şeicaru, Tudor Pamfile, C.Z. Buzdugan, Vasile Voiculescu, Aron Cotruş, George Bacovia, George Nedelea, Vasile Damaschin, Mircea Pavelescu, Ştefan Cosma, G.G. Ursu and Gheorghe Ioniţă.
