= Ion Popescu =

Romanian businessman (1830 – 1901)

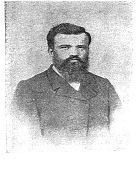
Professor Ion Popescu in 1868 (age 38)

Ion Popescu (1830–1901) was a Romanian teacher and writer. He was born in northern Transylvania and attended school in Baia Mare and Cluj.

Forced to flee from Transylvania because of his involvement in the 1848 Revolution, in 1849 Ion Popescu settled in Bârlad where he first occupied a position of teacher in a primary school, the only school existing at that time in the city. After the founding of the Gheorghe Roşca Codreanu High School in Bârlad, Ion Popescu was appointed professor of Latin, keeping his position till he retired in 1892. Ion Popescu was also one of the founders of the "Normal school for Boys" of Bârlad for the training of elementary teachers.

In 1870 he was one of the founders of the cultural society "Unirea" and on September 27, 1870 established the magazine Semănătorul. He also founded the "Associated Professors' Printing Press" of Bârlad where the magazine and other teaching books were printed.

Ion Popescu died of diabetes on July 11, 1901 in Bârlad.

A bust of Ion Popescu was completed by sculptor Ion Dimitriu-Bârlad and is located in front of the "Normal school" in Bârlad.
