= Tudor Pamfile =

Romanian author (1883-1921)

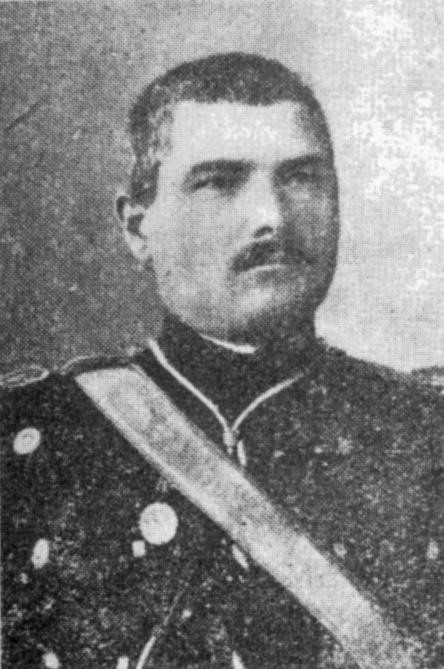
Tudor Pamfile

Tudor Pamfile (11 June 1883 – 21 October 1921) was a Romanian writer.

Tudor Pamfile was born on 11 June 1883 in the village of Țepu in Tecuci County (now in Galați County). He attended primary school and the gymnasium in Tecuci, and then transferred to the Military School in Bucharest. During his studies, he was befriended by Ioan Bianu, who introduced him to the literary circles of Bucharest. Upon graduation he was assigned to the Third Roșiori Regiment in Bârlad.

Tudor Pamfile's work, as a writer was significantly influenced by ethnographer and folklorist Simeon Florea Marian. Pamfile himself is counted among prominent folklorists. He, together with Arthur Gorovei, have been credited with being the first scholars to collect genuine Romanian folktales.

Pamfile was editor of the magazines Ion Creangă and Miron Costin, both published in Bârlad. He also supported the magazine Freamătul initially published in Tecuci, but which moved to Bârlad. He wrote several ethnographic studies and contributed to the magazines Șezătoarea, Analele Academiei Române, Convorbiri Literare, Floarea darurilor, Însemnări literare, Lamura, Viața Românească, Viața literară și artistică and Lumina poporului. With George Tutoveanu and Toma Chiricuță, he was one of the founders of the literary society, Academia Bârlădeană.

Pamfile died on 21 October 1921 in Chișinău (now in Moldova).

== Works ==
- Jocuri de copii (3 volumes), București, 1906–1909
- Cartea pentru tineret de la sate București, 1907 (with Mihai Lupescu and L. Mrejeriu
- Povestire pe scurt despre neamul românesc – Bârlad, 1907
- Cimilituri românești – București, 1908
- Graiul vremurilor (stories) – Vălenii de Munte, 1909
- Feţi frumoşi de odinioară (stories) – București, 1910
- Industria casnică la Români. Trecutul și starea ei de astăzi – București, 1910
- Sărbătorile de vară la români "Summer Holidays of the Romanians" – București, 1910
- Boli și leacuri la oameni, vite şi păsări – București, 1911
- Firișoare de aur (stories and legends) – București, 1911
- Sfârșitul lumii după credințele poporului român – Bârlad, 1911
- Culegere de colinde, cîntece de stea, vicleime, sorcove şi plugușoare, întocmite pentru folosul tineretului ce urează la Crăciun și Anul Nou – București, 1912
- Culegere de ghicitori românești (cimilituri) – București, 1912
- Agricoltura la români – București, 1913
- Cântece de țară – București, 1913
- Povestea lumii de demult "Story of the World of Yore" – București, 1913
- Cromatica poporului român (with Mihai Lupescu) – București, 1914
- Diavolul învrăjbitor al lumii – București, 1914
- Însemnări cu privire la moșia, satul și biserica de la Strîmba din comuna Puiești, județul Tutova (with V. C. Nicolau) – Bîrlad, 1914)
- Sărbătorile de toamnă și postul Crăciunului – București, 1914
- Sărbătorile la români. Crăciunul – București, 1914
- Un tăciune şi-un cărbune. (stories) – București, 1914
- Dragostea în datina tineretului român
- Pământul după credinţele poporului Român.
- Văzduhul după credințele poporului Român (with Antoaneta Olteanu)
- Cerul și podoabele lui, după credințele poporului Român (with Antoaneta Olteanu)
- Mitologie românească
