= Legalitatea =

Romanian newspaper

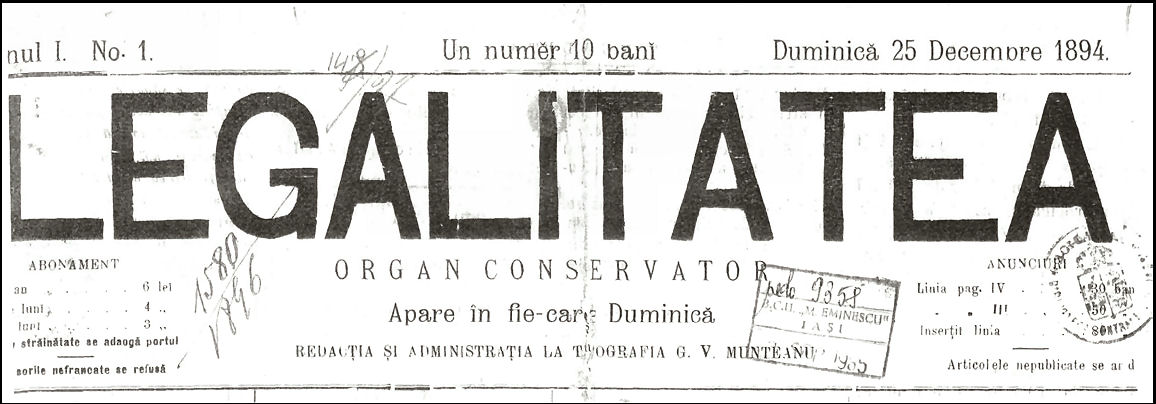
Logo of the magazine "Legalitatea"

Legalitatea was a weekly newspaper published in Bârlad, Romania. The newspaper, covering political, economic and literary topics, was first printed on December 16, 1882, at the G.V. Munteanu printing shop. The last number of the newspaper was printed on January 1, 1884.

The newspaper was published again on December 24, 1894, as a newspaper of the Conservative Party, the political director being Ion Vârgolici being the political director and Theodor Riga the editor in chief. An important contributor of the newspaper was conservator politician and diplomat Theodor Emandi. The newspaper appeared until November 22, 1895.
