= Ioan A. Bassarabescu =

Romanian writer and politician (1870–1952)

Ioan Alecu (I. A.) Bassarabescu
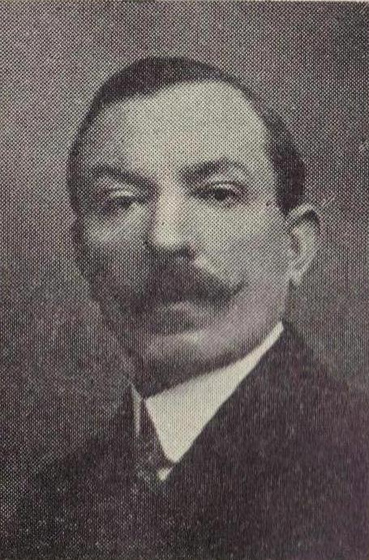
- Born: December 17, 1870; Giurgiu, Kingdom of Romania
- Died: March 27, 1952 (aged 81); Ploiești, Communist Romania
- Occupations: schoolteacher, civil servant, politician
- Writing career
- Period: 1889–1943
- Genres: sketch story, farce, novella, memoir, parody
- Notable awards: Order of the Star of Romania, Officer rank
- Movements: Literary realism, Junimea

Ioan Alecu Bassarabescu (commonly rendered I. A. Bassarabescu; December 17, 1870 – March 27, 1952) was a Romanian comedic writer, civil servant and politician, who served one term (1926–1927) in the Senate of Romania. His work, mainly in prose form, is remembered as an accomplished and noteworthy contribution to Romanian literature, capturing the dreary life of provincial clerks in the early 20th century. Not interested in producing a singular novel, like his mentor Gustave Flaubert, he concentrated instead on the sketch story genre.

In his debut stage, Bassarabescu belonged to Junimea, the mainly literary and politically conservative club. He was friends with Titu Maiorescu, Junimea leader, and with the Junimist author Ioan Alexandru Brătescu-Voinești (with whom he is often compared). Married into a political family, Bassarabescu had joined the Conservative Party by 1906, and, although still mainly active as a teacher, received high appointments in the bureaucracy.

During World War I, Bassarabescu he supported the Central Powers and was even appointed Prefect of Prahova County under a German-led occupation. This put his political career on hold until 1925, when he joined the People's Party. Moving into right-wing populism in the 1930s, Bassarabescu had stints in the National Agrarian Party and the National Christian Party, and joined the official National Renaissance Front in 1939. His last years were spent in seclusion: losing his fortune to Allied carpet bombing, stripped of his Romanian Academy membership by the communist regime, he died suddenly in a road accident.

== Biography ==
=== Early life and debut ===
Bassarabescu descended from boyar families that occupied court positions in Wallachia: his father, Alecu, was a pitar; his mother, Elisa, was the daughter of a staroste, relatives with General Romulus Boteanu. Alecu had received a progressive education at the Saint Sava Academy; his colleagues there later instigated the 1848 Revolution in Wallachia. Although he had settled in the Danube port of Giurgiu, his own family was more closely associated with Bucharest, the national capital. Noted members of this branch include Nicolae "Nae" Bassarabescu, who worked as a journalist in the liberal-radical press, later setting up the first newsstand chain in town, and composer George Bassarabescu.

One of the couple's seven children, Ioan Alecu was born in Giurgiu, an ethnic Romanian baptized into the Romanian Orthodox Church. In 1877, the family left the city because of Ottoman bombardments during the Romanian War of Independence, settling in Bucharest. The eight-year-old Bassarabescu was first enlisted at school in Bucharest's Yellow Ward, and later in the Green Ward.

Enrolled at Saint Sava National College, Bassarabescu was classmates with various intellectual luminaries and political figures of his generation, among them Constantin Banu, Ion Livescu and Scarlat Orăscu. Influenced by their teacher, classical scholar Anghel Demetriescu, they formed their own literary club, which held its meetings in the Saint Sava basement. Together, they put out the makeshift literary review Armonia, described by an aging Bassarabescu as polygraphed "with the faintest and least readable violet letters to have ever been used for writing in this world." It was soon replaced by a less makeshift periodical, the bi-monthly Studentul Român. Bassarabescu published his first short stories in that paper, and then in the youth review Generația Viitoare, before being hosted (with words of praise and encouragement) by the literary supplement of Românul newspaper.

Studentul Român only put out three issues, closing down due to a "lack of funds", but not, as Bassarabescu quipped, to a "lack of scientific and literary contributions". By this time, the Saint Sava pupils began attending literary- and social-themed conferences at the Romanian Atheneum. It was there that Bassarabescu met the successful writer Alexandru Vlahuță, who gave him some of his first literary pointers. Soon, Bassarabescu's pieces were hosted by Revista Nouă, a literary journal managed by Bogdan Petriceicu Hasdeu (1893). This was an impressive feat, to judge by Bassarabescu's own words: "imposingly grand" and "too expensive" venture, Revista Nouă had fascinated him and his Saint Sava colleagues. He also dabbled in parodic poetry, some of which was published by the Symbolist review, Literatorul.

By 1896, after such permutations, Bassarabescu was firmly affiliated with Junimea, contributing to the Junimist tribune, Convorbiri Literare, and cultivating a friendship with its founder, Titu Maiorescu. Like his generational colleague Ioan Alexandru Brătescu-Voinești, Bassarabescu joined in just as the Convorbiri Literare, for long disregarded by Maiorescu, was entering its decline stage. As noted by literary historian Zigu Ornea, the stories of Bassarabescu and Brătescu-Voinești were a rare diversion, the magazine having grown "monotonous", "suffocated by bulky specialized studies". Bassarabescu was not dissuaded by such problems: he would contribute to the magazine throughout most of his life. He managed to impress a wide range of professionals, from the Junimist novelist Duiliu Zamfirescu (who guessed in him a future "great writer") to the independent Ilarie Chendi.

Between his move from Revista Nouă to Junimea, Bassarabescu had enlisted at the Literature and Philosophy Faculty of the University of Bucharest (graduated 1897), while also working as a Finance Ministry clerk. At around that time, he had moved to Ploiești city, Prahova, where he would live for most of his life, and became a teacher of geography and French. Various sources have it that his relocation occurred in 1896 or 1897, but, according to literary historian George Călinescu, Bassarabescu had spent 1898 working as a substitute teacher in Focșani. Around that moment, his work appeared in the review Noutatea, put out in Iași by Berman Goldner-Giordano.

=== Political and literary rise ===
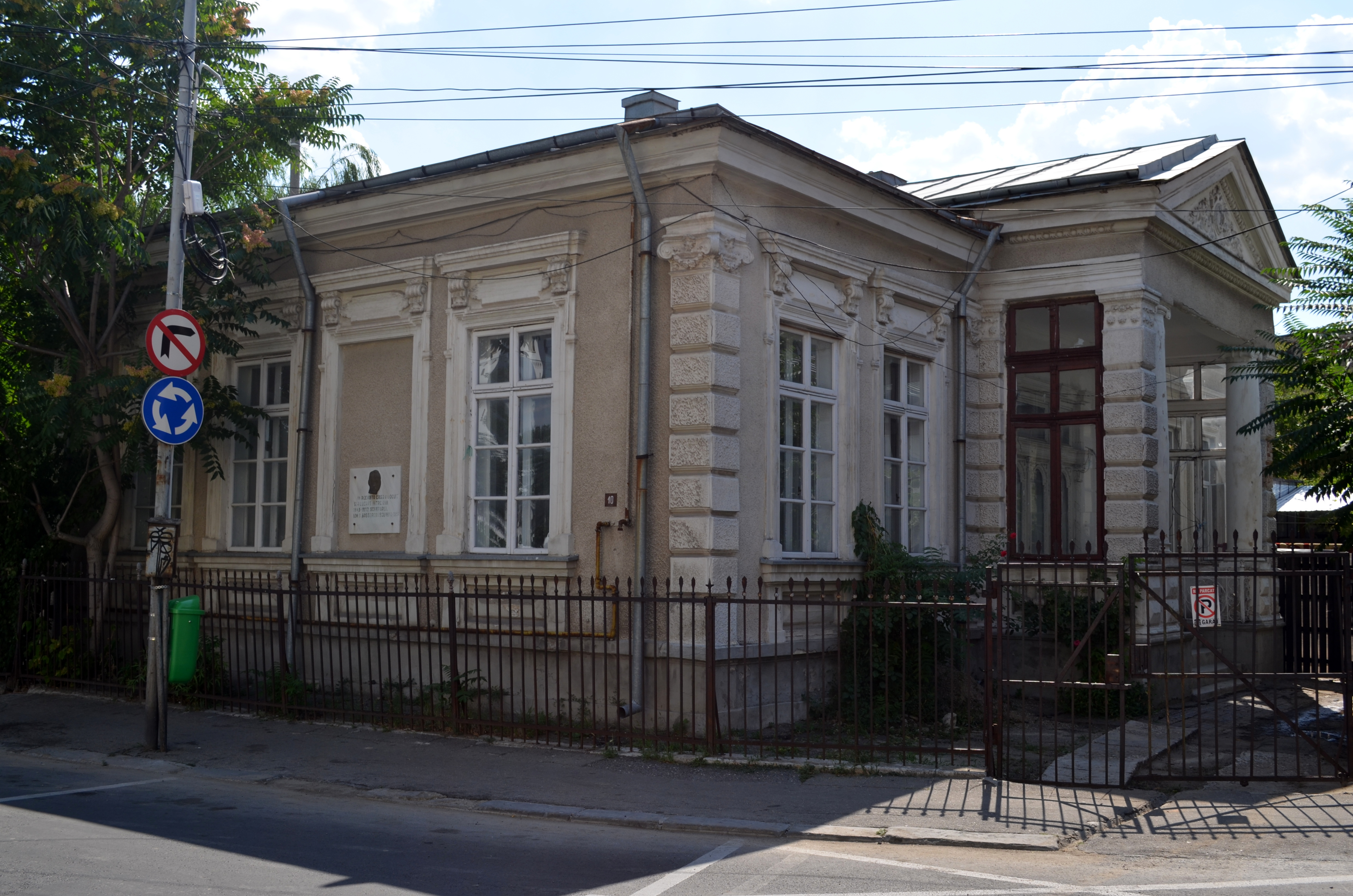
Temelie Dinescu and Bassarabescu's residence in Ploiești

In January 1900, with the start of a new Convorbiri Literare series, Bassarabescu was co-opted onto the journal's editorial committee, overseen by geographer Grigore Antipa. According to Ornea, the panel membership evidenced in itself that political Junimism had mutated into eclecticism: Antipa was a National Liberal, and one regular member, Dimitrie Voinov, a socialist. Like other Convorbiri Literare contributors, Bassarabescu saw his work published in the more radical right-wing Sămănătorul magazine, but he did not necessarily identify with the Sămănătorul agenda. He was invited to publish there by his mentor Vlahuță, who rewarded his contribution with an original canvas by painter Nicolae Grigorescu. In 1903, he answered a similar call from Livescu, publishing in the new magazine Revista Teatrelor.

Politically, he leaned toward the mainstream Conservative Party, which had Maiorescu as chief doctrinaire. It is probable that Bassarabescu began frequenting the Ploiești Conservative chapter in or around 1901, making friends with political boss Temelie Dinescu, and courting his intellectual daughter, Ecaterina Dinescu. From about 1906, he registered formally with the Conservative Party.

In April 1904, Bassarabescu married Ecaterina Dinescu. The modest ceremony was compensated by a sizable dowry (including a family home on R. Stanian Street) and a honeymoon in Venice. Temelie Dinescu died just four months after the event, leaving them ownership of another home, located on a street that was named in his honor. Some time after, Ecaterina gave birth to a daughter, Maria-Elisabeta (whom both parents nicknamed Cireșica, "Little Cherry").

The first bound collection of Bassarabescu's novellas and stories was released (as Nuvele) in 1903, with Editura Socec. In 1907, Editura Minerva and Biblioteca pentru toți published two other selections, Vulturii ("The Eagles") and Norocul ("Luck"). With Mihail Sadoveanu, A. de Herz, Emil Gârleanu, George Ranetti and some others, he was employed by the National Theatre Bucharest to work on professional translations of comedy and drama. As Livescu recounts, this was a project heralded by manager Pompiliu Eliade, who had recently been "appalled" by the poor-quality translations already in circulation. Bassarabescu was assigned to work on comedies by Georges Courteline, and, Livescu argues, did an "excellent" job. In 1908, Socec published his adaptation of a 15th-century farce, Master Pierre Pathelin (as Ovidiu Șicană). His wife also wrote poetry and prose, published in reviews such as Luceafărul, Convorbiri Critice or Epoca, usually under the pen name of Irena Mohor.

During those years, the Bassarabescu family played host to a long succession of writers visiting Ploiești. Bassarabescu became rather close friends with two senior figures on the cultural scene: the Ploiești literary theorist Constantin Dobrogeanu-Gherea and satirist Ion Luca Caragiale. In March 1908, Bassarabescu affiliated with the prototype Romanian Writers' Society, and was elected a member of its steering committee. As such, he had a say in the scandal during which the Society, which was Christian-only, moved to reprimand a Jewish Romanian writer, Eugen Porn, and was in turn accused of antisemitism. Bassarabescu took a partisan position, acknowledging that some of Porn's concerns were valid, but concluding that Porn was rather the anti-Romanian.

A Freemason, he was proposed for membership in the Romanian Academy by Duiliu Zamfirescu and seconded by Maiorescu, themselves Freemasons. He was elected a corresponding member on March 25, 1909. Also in 1909, Socec published another selection of his writings, Noi și vechi ("New Ones and Old Ones"). Some two years later, Bassarabescu received high appointment in the Education Ministry, as Inspector for the Arts for Minister Constantin C. Arion. In 1912, he was commissioned as Inspector-General for Education.

=== Germanophile and Prefect ===
The onset of World War I marked a turn in Bassarabescu's life. During Romania's neutrality years (1914–1916), he adapted himself to the Germanophile sentiments of his Junimist and Conservative peers. He gave lectures at the Bucharest Conservative Club, on topics such as Realpolitik and the British Empire. He also joined Junimea geographer Simion Mehedinți in putting out Dumineca Poporului review, but contributed his trademark satirical pieces, rather than political articles. Such works were grouped in the 1916 volume Nenea ("Old Chap"), published with Alcaly.

Eventually, Ferdinand I of Romania declared war on Austria-Hungary, the German Empire and the other Central Powers. It came as a shock for the Germanophiles. Although subject to the Romanian Army draft, Bassarabescu managed to avoid being called into active duty, and was instead appointed captain of a military reserve in Mogoșoaia train station. Through their personal contacts, both Mehedinți and Maiorescu tried to get Bassarabescu appointed to an even safer position, at a postal censorship bureau.

In the second half of 1916, the Central Powers broke through Romania's line of defenses, forcing the government and the Army to withdraw northeast, into Moldavia; Bucharest was abandoned. In these circumstances, Bassarabescu checked himself into a Bucharest hospital, claiming that he suffered from a "severe cold". This allowed him to stay in German-occupied territory, and, in the Romanian loyalist ranks, labeled him a probable deserter. As historian Lucian Boia notes, the suspicion is still standing: an entry in Maiorescu's diary shows that Bassarabescu had left the hospital on at least one occasion during the interval of his supposed illness.

In the wake of the Battle of Bucharest, Bassarabescu was held in captivity and processed by the German Army. Alexandru Tzigara-Samurcaș, a Junimist in the German ranks, intervened for his release, and then employed him at the Bucharest Police Prefecture — Bassarabescu served there as Divisional Chief from February to April 1917. The Germans then forced Bassarabescu back to his adoptive Ploiești and to his schoolteacher's career. According to writer Victor Eftimiu, who knew and befriended Bassarabescu, this assignment suited him perfectly: "Himself a shy man [like his characters,] he was content with sticking to his provincial schoolteacher's job."

A year later, with peace negotiations under way between the Central Powers and Romania, Bassarabescu was reintegrated into the civil service by the emergency cabinet of Alexandru Marghiloman, a Germanophile Conservative. On May 7, 1918, he was made Prefect of Prahova County. He lasted there for a full nine months, earning respect from the populace and defending its interests in disputes with the German occupiers.

The Armistice with Germany on the Western Front revolutionized Romania's positioning and brought Marghiloman's administration to a standstill. On the very day of the Armistice, Bassarabescu handed in his resignation. The loyalist regime which took over suspended Bassarabescu from his teaching post, and subjected him to a military inquiry. He was eventually cleared, even praised for his efforts as Prefect, and allowed to resume his work in education. He also resumed his literary activity, which resulted in the 1919 volume Un dor împlinit ("A Satisfied Longing", Steinberg Publishers), followed in 1923 by another Socec edition of Nuvele and Moș Stan ("Old Man Stan", Editura Cultura Națională). In 1923, he joined the Writers' Society literary tour of Transylvania, sharing the stage with Eugeniu Botez, Al. T. Stamatiad, Ion Minulescu and others.

=== Conservative decline and 1925 return ===
Throughout the war and down to Marghiloman's death, Bassarabescu held on to the presidency of a declining Prahova Conservative chapter. The whole party, now redesigned into a Conservative-Progressive group, was becoming numerically insignificant. According to Bassarabescu's own claim, this was because, in post-war Greater Romania, "mediocrity", "obscurantism" and "fishing in murky waters" had become the standard of political life. Marghiloman, he argued, was a "sailor" in an age that preferred "corsairs". Historian Dorin Stănescu places blame for the party's decline on Bassarabescu himself, noting that his investigation for treason contributed to its dismal results in the election of November 1919.

In the mid 1920s, Bassarabescu himself abandoned the Conservative-Progressives, and made a successful return to national politics. He joined the People's Party (PP) of Alexandru Averescu. In exchange, he was made Vice President of the PP section in Prahova and, following the June 1926 election, a Senator for that county. In office only until the 1927 recall, he worked on the short story selections Un om în toată firea ("A Fully Grown Man"), published that year with Socec, and Domnu Dincă ("Mister Dincă"), which came out, in 1928, at Casa Școalelor. Two more small volumes of his works were published in the Cartea Românească digest: Spre Slatina ("Onwards to Slatina"), then Pe drezină ("On the Draisine"). In 1930, the Grand Orient of Romania elected Bassarabescu one of its Masonic Lodge Officers—demoted to honorary member in 1933, and affiliated with the regional Libertatea Lodge in 1937. There was also a proposal to make him a full member of the Romanian Academy, where, in 1928, he was giving a formal speech narrating "two epochs in Romanian literature". According to his own recollections, although he passed one round of voting, he was eventually sidelined and another candidate took the seat (1931).

In 1932, the PP split between a conservative group, headed by Averescu, and a radical one, led by Octavian Goga. Bassarabescu sided with the latter, leaving the PP to join Goga's National Agrarian Party (PNA). This was a problematic political move: the PNA was firmly planted on the antisemitic right-wing, albeit its prejudice was mild enough to even allow some Jews into party ranks. At the time, his more virulently antisemitic colleague, Brătescu-Voinești, was gathering support for purging the literary world of what he called "abject" Jewish influences. Bassarabescu occasionally joined in, such as when he cosigned Brătescu's letter to novelist Mihail Sadoveanu, an ambiguous document which implied that Sadoveanu had given in to such Jewish influences.

Three years later, Bassarabescu followed the National Agrarians into their merger with the National-Christian Defense League, and became a member of the resulting National Christian Party (PNC). This was a more evidently antisemitic organization, unwelcoming of all Jewish PNA members, and publishing open statements against "the kikes". As noted by Bassarabescu himself, he was still a PNC member in May 1938, "upon the chief's [Goga's] death". His literary work at the time was an anthology of Romanian literature, edited in collaboration with Petre Haneș (published 1937). In 1935, Convorbiri Literare, in the process of recovering unknown writings by the late Maiorescu, also published four letters that Maiorescu had sent to Bassarabescu decades before.

=== Final years ===
Bassarabescu benefited from the rise of an authoritarian single-party regime during the early month of World War II. He made a publicized bid to join the National Renaissance Front, and was accepted into its ranks on Christmas Day, 1939. In 1940, Casa Școalelor put out his Opere complete ("Complete Works"). As a guest of the Romanian Atheneum, Bassarabescu introduced the public to the largely forgotten work of a 19th-century female writer, Sofia Cocea.

He was by then a highly decorated member of the establishment: a recipient of the Order of the Crown (commander), the Order of the Star of Romania (officer) and the Cultural Merit Order (officer). His work focused on recollections from an earlier age, such as a 1942 piece about his youthful encounters with Vlahuță, in Gazeta Cărților, a literary newspaper. In 1943, Editura Cugetarea put on sale his definitive collection of Proză ("Prose"), which included some of his memoirs. As Eftimiu notes, they are self-deriding pieces, acknowledging "a mediocre destiny".

The Bassarabescu family fortunes turned during the carpet bombing campaign of 1944. While the Bassarabescus fled for their safety to nearby Slănic, their Stanian Street lodging was destroyed; they moved to their Dinescu Street residence. Upon war's end, Bassarabescu was also targeted for political retaliation. In 1948, the new communist regime stripped Bassarabescu and 112 others of their Academy membership.

The same year, Ecaterina Bassarabescu died, leaving Ioan Alecu to be cared for by daughter Maria-Elisabeta. The latter was a career woman, who had graduated law school and was among the first Romanian female judges. On March 27, 1952, Bassarabescu himself died, the result of a car accident in Ploiești. Although Călinescu and Eftimiu simply note this is a fact, later sources describe the circumstances of this accident as generally suspicious. In death, Bassarabescu was recoverable. According to Eftimiu, communism allowed Bassarabescu's work to be published "in tens of thousands of copies", "a circulation that they have never had before." The Giurgiu County library in his native city bears his name since 1991.

== Literary work ==
The chief sources of inspiration behind Bassarabescu's comedic and realistic style were two Junimist figures: the Romanian classic Ion Luca Caragiale, and his own friend, Brătescu-Voinești. In their immediate temporal setting, Brătescu-Voinești and Bassarabescu were both influential on other noted, non-Junimist, authors of short prose: Emil Gârleanu and (for a while) Mihail Sadoveanu. Beyond this generation, they also influenced the novels or novellas of Lucia Mantu, Marius "G. M. Vlădescu" Mircu and Cezar Petrescu.

The eye of such writers is firmly focused on a class of individuals, described for instance in Călinescu: "the isolated folk of provincial boroughs, small-time functionaries of the Romanian Railways, minuscule bourgeois women grinding the great passions of life." Contrary to Brătescu-Voinești, he did not depict such men and women as existential losers or "misfits", but as entirely content with their mediocrity, their "terrestrial ideal": "these people", Călinescu writes, "do not suffer, because they do not aim for, or better said they do not foresee, any existence that would be better than theirs." The telegraphist Domițian, protagonist of Vulturi, identifies perfection with a hefty state pension; Mister Guță, of the eponymous story, will only accept the company of women who share his obsession for oleander flowers.

As another distinguishing feature, Bassarabescu replaces Caragiale's sarcasm with a "lyrical", "tenderly grotesque", layer, while offering "the surprise of a humane bedding" within the provincial soul. His smile, Victor Eftimiu notes, was one "of compassion", his gaze "filtered by tears", like that of a Romanian Anton Chekhov. Literary critic Eugen Lovinescu finds, in most of Bassarabescu's writings, "the same family atmosphere with its links of solidarity, with all the hardships of finding their daughters husbands, with sisters that will devour each other out of love, with brothers that will carry on their shoulders the maintenance of their entire household". This, Lovinescu believes, was the quintessential "Romanian family" of the urban milieu, with only a lack of "fantasy" and failure at pacing preventing Bassarabescu from producing the great Romanian urban novel. (According to Eftimiu, there is in fact an unpublished Bassarabescu novel, as well as a screenplay.)

Bassarabescu's most lyrical pieces may be characterologic studies of sheer timidity, or other debilitating emotions. In writing Un om în toată firea, Bassarabescu shared his own experience as a schoolteacher. He found it impossible to fail a grown man trying to pass his primary school exam, even after discovering that he steals notes from his own daughter. Elsewhere, a luncheon among family and friends end in collective weeping: people at the table morn their very victim, a long-suffering turkey "with a memorable past". This "tenderly grotesque" particularity came through another major influence on Bassarabescu, which distinguishes him among Caragiale's followers: Gustave Flaubert, whose ironic-but-sympathetic accounts of provincial life are at the source of Bassarabescu's "Bovaryistic literature". Such a melange, Călinescu writes, allowed Bassarabescu to cut "his own profile, with just a minimal literary activity." In Pe drezină, possibly his most Bovaryistic story, the female protagonist dreams of escaping her drab marriage (to an obese station master), for just a taste of life in the capital. Her ideal of what that life is largely shaped by her one-time visit to Bucharest's Gara de Nord.

Several of Bassarabescu's sketch story works as recognized as tiny masterpieces of the "still-life" variety. This means that they suggest a deep layer of meaning just by describing the assortments of a room, or an object apart, without any actual human presence. Acasă ("Home") is a careful inventory of a room seemingly rented by a partying and womanizing officer, including the half-pleading, half-threatening, letter he receives from his desperate supplier of "colonial goods". According to Călinescu, such works may even be paralleled to modern art in their studied depiction of "urban dreariness". For a relevant case, he cites the sketch story fragment: "At once, through the beer garden gates, a man showed up carrying with him a giant plank resting on a pole. On this plank, a poster. On the poster, in large handwriting and red paint: 'Gentlemen, today our buffet is serving you vanilla ice cream'."
