= Gheorghe Lazăr National College =

Gheorghe Lazăr National College (Romanian: Colegiul Național Gheorghe Lazăr) may refer to one of two educational institutions in Romania:

- Gheorghe Lazăr National College (Bucharest)
- Gheorghe Lazăr National College (Sibiu)
