= Bârladul =

Romanian Weekly Newspaper

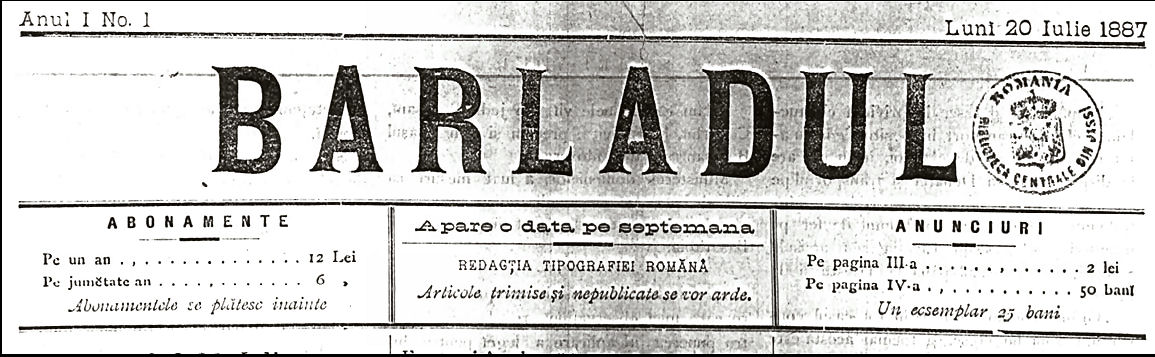
Logo of the magazine "Bârladul"

Bârladul was a weekly newspaper published in Bârlad, Romania. The newspaper was first published on 20 July 1887 by Solomon Haliţă and Gheorghe Ghibănescu. Its main contributors were Grigore Negură, C.Slobozeanu, St. G. Drăgănescu, Ion Chiriacescu and Theodor Emandi. Other authors were Gheorghe Ghibănescu, D.H. Petrovici, D.G. Dorin, Lazăr Grecea, Anghelachi S. Creţu, Constant Drăgulinescu, Leon Gârbea. The last edition of the newspaper was printed on 28 August 1888.

The newspaper was published again on 16 September 1898 as a supporter of the Conservative Party, the editor in chief being politician and diplomat Theodor Emandi. The newspaper was printed alternatively by the George Caţafani and the C. D. Lupaşcu printing houses. It appeared, with great irregularity, until 1914.
