= Scrisul Nostru =

Literary magazine published in Romania between 1929 and 1931

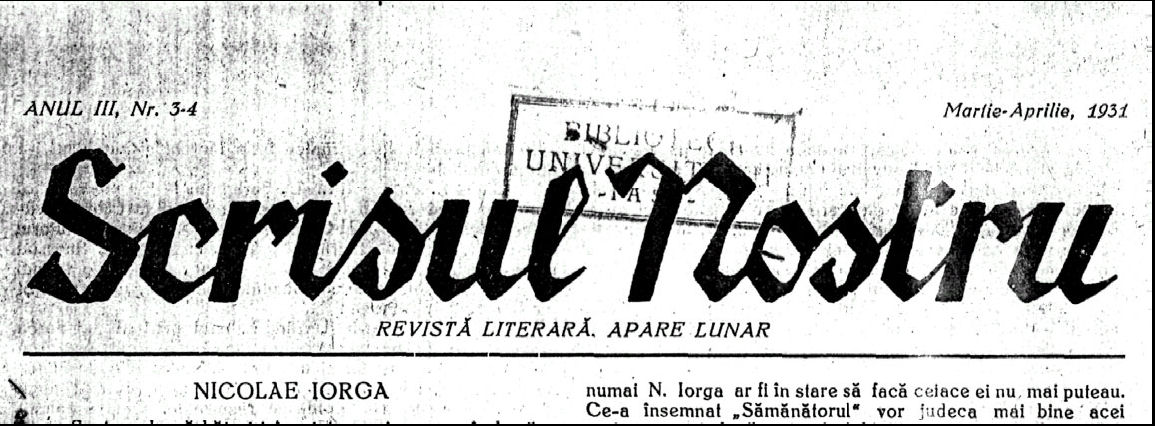
Logo of the "Scrisul Nostru" magazine

Scrisul Nostru was a monthly literary magazine published in Bârlad, Romania by the Academia Bârlădeană". The first issue of the magazine was issued in January, 1929 and it appeared, with some irregularity, until October 1931, a total of 21 numbers were printed.

The editor in chief of the newspaper was George Tutoveanu who also wrote the editorials of each issue and the responses to letters from readers. Other important contributors were G. Tutoveanu, George Pallady, D. Fărcăşanu, Syilvia Pan (Natalia Paşa), Zoe G. Frasin, N.N. Lenguceanu, Virgil Duiculescu, Vasile Damaschin (who also had the responsibility of the newspaper's graphics and also coordinated the "Literary discussions"), Ştefan Cosma, George Nedelea, George Damaschin, Olga Alexa, G. G. Ursu, Z. Letin, N. Bogescu, C. Crişan, and I.A. Basarabescu
