= Paloda =

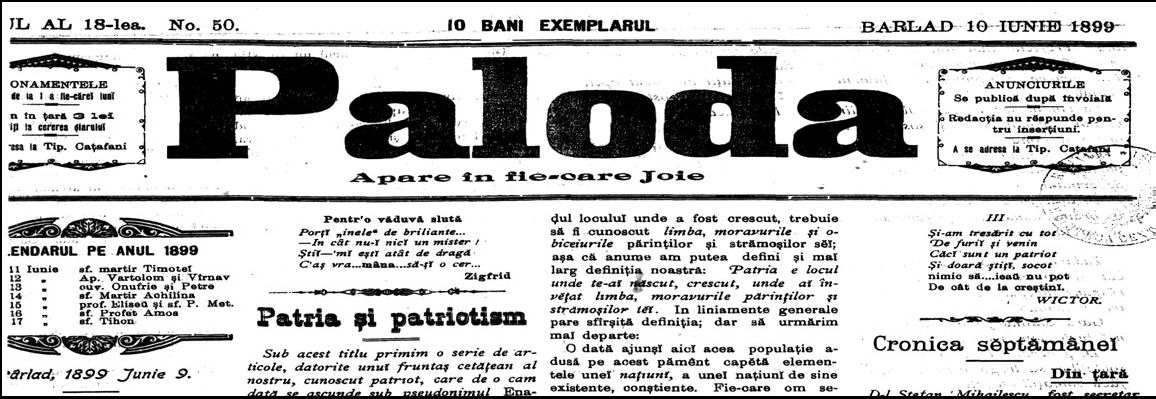
Logo of the magazine "Paloda"

Paloda was a literary magazine published in Bârlad, Romania. (Paloda is the old name of the city of Bârlad) The magazine was established on 5 February 1881 by Ştefan Neagoe. The magazine continued to appear until 1883 when it was replaced by the Tutova newspaper. Its publication restarted in 1893 and continued till 1908.
