= Ștefan Neagoe =

Romanian teacher and writer (1838–1897)

Ştefan Neagoe (1838–1897) was a Romanian teacher and writer. He worked as professor at the Gheorghe Roşca Codreanu High School in Bârlad.

In 1870 he was one of the founders of the cultural society "Unirea" and on September 27, 1870, established the magazine Semănătorul. He also founded the "Associated Professors' Printing Press" of Bârlad where the magazine and other teaching books were printed. In 1881 he established the magazine Paloda.

Ştefan Neagoe died in Bârlad in 1897.
