= Ștefan Petică =

Romanian poet and journalist

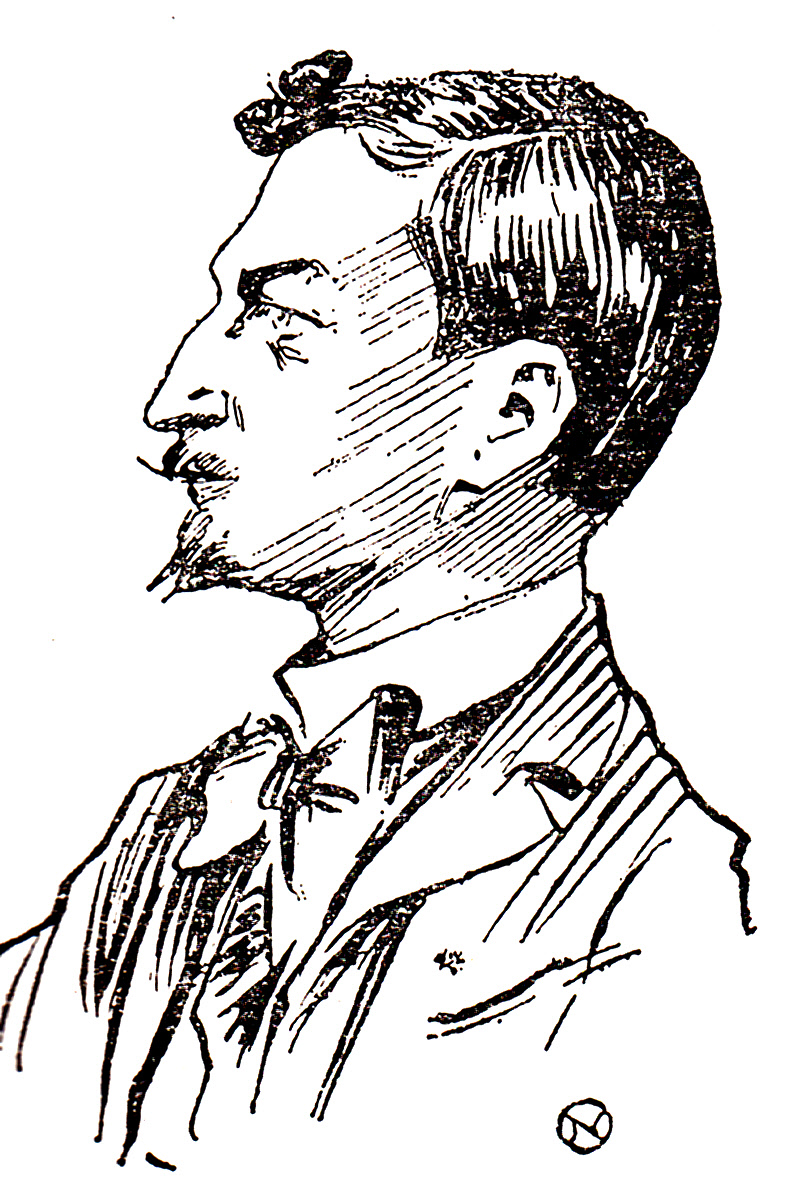
- Petică, as sketched by Nicolae Petrescu-Găină
- Born: January 20, 1877; Bucești, Galați County, Kingdom of Romania
- Died: October 17, 1904 (aged 27); Bucești
- Occupations: poet, playwright, literary theorist, journalist
- Writing career
- Pen name: Caton, Erics, Mușat, Narcis, Sapho, Senez, Sentino, Sergiu, Step, Stiopca, Ștefan, Trubadur, Șt. P.
- Period: 1894–1903
- Genres: poetry, drama
- Literary movement: Symbolism

Ștefan Petică (Romanian pronunciation: [ʃteˈfan ˈpetikə]; January 20, 1877 – October 17, 1904) was a Romanian Symbolist poet, prose writer, playwright, journalist, and socialist activist. Born in the countryside of Tecuci, he displayed a voracious appetite for literature and philosophy since his early years. After high school, he made his way to the national capital Bucharest, where university studies soon gave way to low-paid newspaper work. Petică published one volume of poetry before his premature death, and left his mark as one of the first exponents of the domestic Symbolist movement.

== Biography ==
=== Origins, education and intellectual influences ===
Born in Bucești, Galați County, his parents were the free peasants (răzeși) Ianache and Catinca Petică. He attended primary school in nearby Liești, followed by the D. A. Sturdza gymnasium in Tecuci (1888–1892) and the Nicolae Bălcescu High School in Brăila (1892–1896). Petică obtained his high school degree in Bucharest in 1898. He enrolled at the University of Bucharest's literature and philosophy faculty, but did not graduate due to a lack of funds that led him to become a prolific but poorly paid journalist. Although he was a good science student in high school, he was more interested in literature, gaining fluency in French, German, and English and keeping current with contemporary European writers. His reading of foreign authors was done in the original language, including the three aforementioned as well as Spanish and Italian; he also acquired some knowledge of Russian. He was also interested in philosophy and sociology which he read widely and with care. He and a classmate reportedly preferred a study of Herbert Spencer to lunch, and a poem by Walt Whitman to supper.

In spite of his perpetual poverty, Petică's omnivorous intellect led him to Greek and Roman classics, a commentary on the Quran, verses by Ferdowsi in German, Copernican astronomy, Spanish romances, Franz Miklosich's study of Romanian philology, Johann Wolfgang von Goethe's aesthetics; works by Wilhelm Wundt, Arthur Schopenhauer, Arthur de Gobineau and Spencer's First Principles; the archaeological findings of Johann Joachim Winckelmann and Stefan George's magazine Blätter für die Kunst. Others who entered his radius include Théodore Aubanel, Frédéric Mistral, Stendhal, Ernest Renan, Ugo Foscolo, Fyodor Dostoyevsky, Ivan Turgenev, Leo Tolstoy and Alexander Herzen. His critical references from 1900 to 1903 show that he not only knew Charles Baudelaire, Stéphane Mallarmé, Paul Verlaine, Jean Moréas, Albert Samain, Emile Verhaeren, and Maurice Maeterlinck, but was also serious about art history. His commentary used studies of Greek art by Winckelmann and Gotthold Ephraim Lessing, as well as aesthetic arguments by John Ruskin.

=== Socialist militant, poetry and legacy ===
Petică was an adherent of the socialist movement starting in Brăila in 1893, when he joined the workers' club where Izabela Andrei was very active. His political reading included Spencer, Schopenhauer, and Renan, as well as John Stuart Mill, Thomas Carlyle, Pierre Paul Royer-Collard, Victor Cousin, and Hippolyte Taine; he carefully summarized his readings of these thinkers on note cards. He carried on a correspondence on socialist topics with Eugeniu Botez, then attending high school in Iași. He published in the socialist newspaper Munca from 1894. His journalistic debut was an article there titled "Socialismul la sate" ("Socialism in the Villages"). He also wrote for the socialist Lumea nouă from 1896, becoming editor in 1898.

Following a split in the movement, he joined the group led by V. A. Urechia, vocally renouncing his former ideas and between 1898 and 1903, writing a series of articles with anti-socialist declarations. Other publications in which his work appeared include Apărarea națională, Depeșa, Dorobanțul, Literatorul, Lumea nouă literară și științifică, România ilustrată, România jună, and Sămănătorul. His first published verse appeared in Lumea nouă literară și științifică in 1896; this was the poem "Cântec" ("Song"). He sometimes signed with the pen names Caton, Erics, Mușat, Narcis, Sapho, Senez, Sentino, Sergiu, Step, Stiopca, Ștefan, and Trubadur, or with the initials Șt. P. He was editorial secretary of Alexandru Macedonski's Literatorul from February to June 1899.

He belonged to the Bohemian milieu of Bucharest at the turn of the 20th century and was active in Macedonski's circle. Petică's poems, collected in the 1902 Fecioara în alb. Când vioarele tăcură. Moartea visurilor, were among the first notable achievements of the Symbolist movement in Romania, striking in their thematic, imagistic, and tonal unity. He was also a theoretician of Symbolism, which he knew in its Western European form and which he was able to define convincingly. He also published plays (Solii păcii, 1900–1901 and Frații, 1903), leaving behind manuscript plans for over thirty of them. His prose includes both journalism (political and sketches) and delicate and melancholic prose poems that show an authentic sensibility to nature.

In 1904, increasingly ill with tuberculosis, he first quit his post as a librarian at the Domains Ministry, then left the capital city altogether. After returning to his parents' home, he died in his native village at the age of 27. The public library in Tecuci has borne his name since 1994.

== Bibliography ==
- Fecioara în alb. Când vioarele tăcură. Moartea visurilor (poems), Bucharest, 1902
- Frații (play in four acts), Bucharest, 1903
- Morfologia socială, Bucharest, 1903
- Sociologia veche și sociologia nouă, Bucharest, 1903
- Cântecul toamnei. Serenade demonice (poems), Bucharest, 1909
- Poeme. Fecioara în alb. Când vioarele tăcură. Moartea visurilor. Cântecul toamnei. Serenade demonice, ed. Nicolae Davidescu, Bucharest, undated
- Opere, ed. Nicolae Davidescu, Bucharest, 1938
- Scrieri, I–II, ed. Eufrosina Molcuț, Bucharest, 1970–1974
- Versuri, Chișinău, 1999
