= Semănătorul (1870–1876) =

Semănătorul (The Sower) was a literary magazine published in Bârlad, Romania published by the local cultural society "Unirea". The magazine was established on 27 September 1870 by Ion Popescu, professor at the Gheorghe Roşca Codreanu High School and Ştefan Neagoe. Other main contributors to the magazine were Panaite Chenciu, I.C. Codrescu and Stroe Beloescu.

The magazine continued to appear until 1876.

The magazine should not be confused with the Sămănătorul published in 1901 by George Coşbuc and Alexandru Vlahuţă
