= George Lazăr (magazine) =

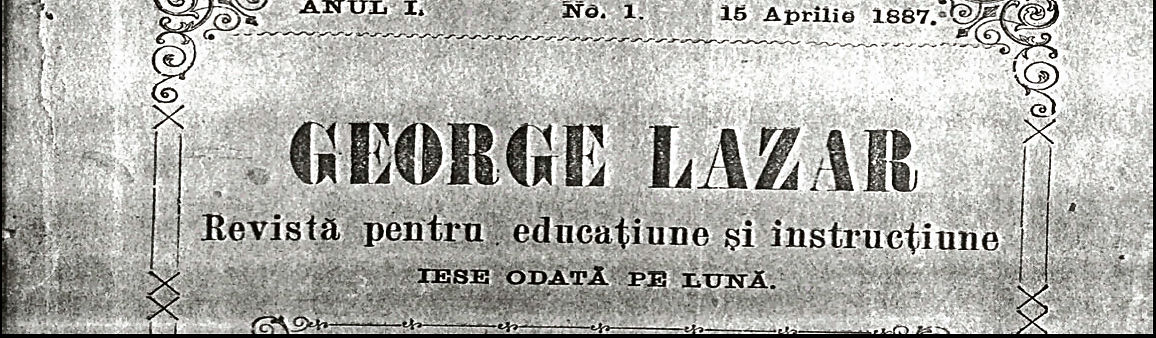
Logo of the magazine "George Lazăr"

George Lazăr was a cultural magazine published in Bârlad. The magazine was established on 15 April 1887 by Solomon Haliţă. The editorial committee included G. Constantinescu Râmniceanu, Gheorghe Ghibănescu, Gavril Onişor, V.G. Diaconescu and L. Apostolescu.

The main objective of the magazine was to cover subjects of interest for the teaching staff. However, besides pedagogy, the magazine also presented articles related to literature, science and culture. The name of the magazine evokes Gheorghe Lazăr, the founder of the first Romanian language school in Bucharest. The magazine promoted the nationalism of Simion Bărnuțiu while he was professor at the University of Iaşi.

George Lazăr ceased publication in 1889. The pedagogical publications continued in Barlad by Tribuna pedagogică magazine (from 1922 until 1923), and by the Îndrumări pedagogice magazine (from 1931 until 1939).
