= Tutova (newspaper) =

Romanian weekly newspaper

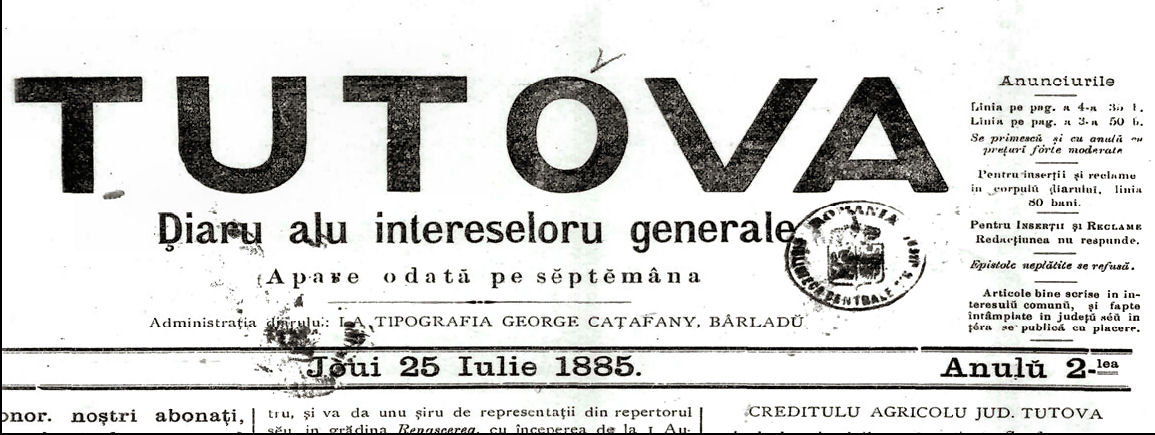
Logo of the magazine "Tutova"

Tutova was a weekly newspaper published in Bârlad, Romania between 1884 and 1892. The newspaper was published by editor and printer George Caţafany. The director of the newspaper was Panaite Chenciu. Among its contributors were Ştefan Neagoe (1838-1897) and Theodor Riga, professor at the Gheorghe Roşca Codreanu High School under the pen name "Herodot".

Other publications with the name "Tutova" were published later in Bârlad, such as:

- Tutova - magazine of the students of the city of Bârlad published in August 1905
- Tutova - weekly newspaper, published irregularly from 29 September 1905 until 24 December 1909
