= Progresul (newspaper) =

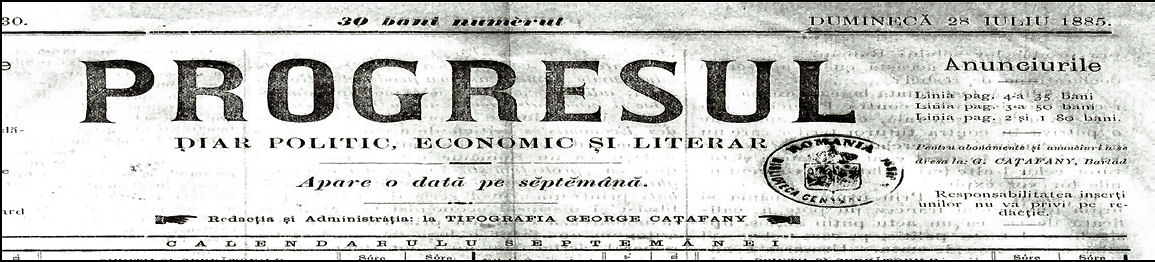
Logo of the newspaper "Progresul"

Progresul was a weekly newspaper published in Bârlad, Romania. The newspaper was first printed on 9 November 1883, at the G.V. Munteanu printing shop. Though claiming to support the Liberal Party, the newspaper published mostly cultural articles, contributed by the professors of the Gheorghe Roşca Codreanu High School. The newspaper also supported the Nathalie Drouhet Girls' Boarding School of Bârlad. The last number of the newspaper was printed on 1 January 1884.
