= Emil Gârleanu =

Romanian prose writer (1878–1914)

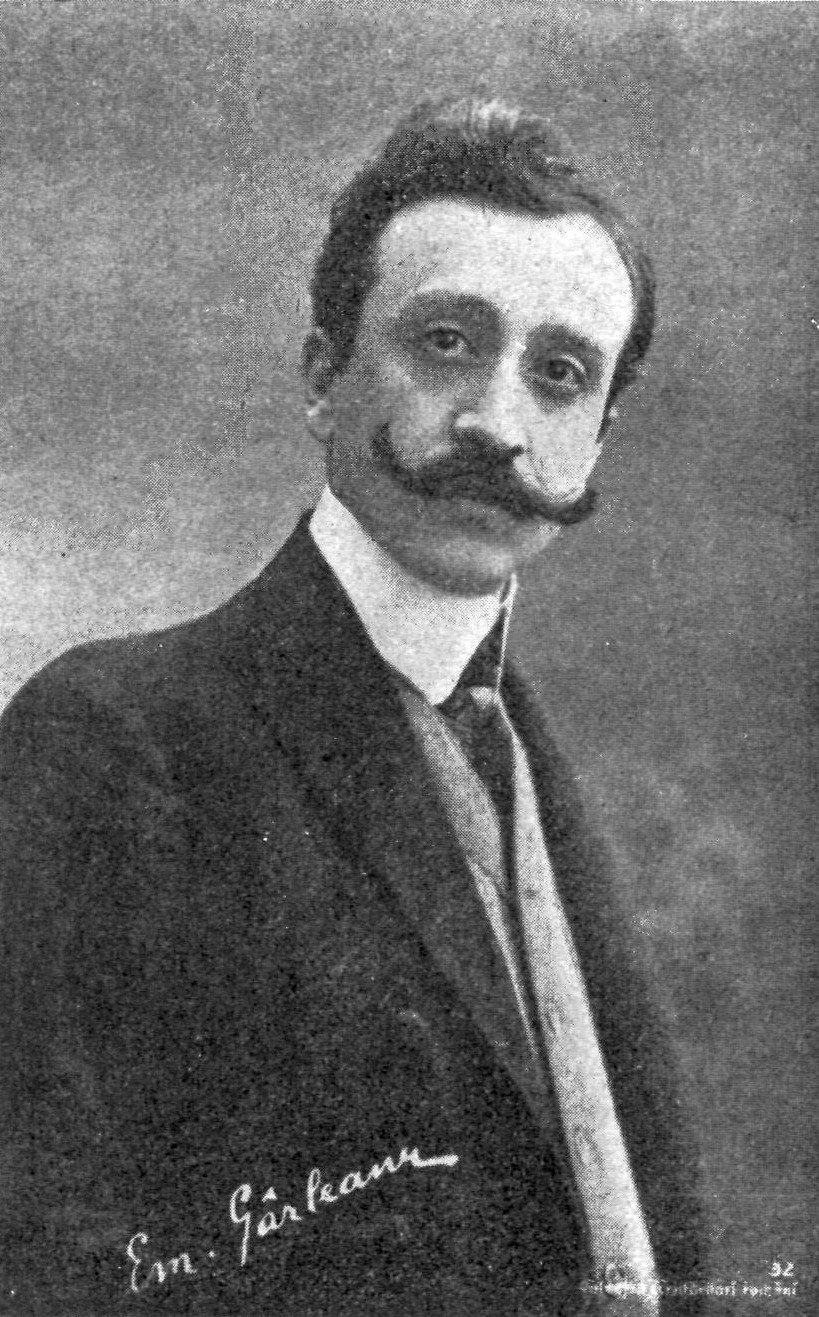
Emil Gârleanu

Emil Gârleanu ( 4/5 January 1878 – 2 July 1914) was a Romanian prose writer.

Born in Iași, his parents were Emanoil Gârleanu, a colonel in the Romanian Army, and his wife Pulcheria (née Antipa). He began high school in his native city in 1889, but withdrew after the first three grades. He then entered the School for Soldiers' Sons in the same city, where one of his classmates was Eugeniu Botez. In 1898, he enrolled in the Infantry School and was assigned to the Ștefan cel Mare 13th Regiment. Due to his journalistic activity, prohibited by the rules, he was transferred to Bârlad as a disciplinary measure. His literary debut took place in 1900, in Arhiva magazine, where he published the poem "Iubitei" and the sketch "Dragul mamei", both signed with the pen name Emilgar. In 1900, Gârleanu enrolled in the literature faculty of Iași University, but did not attend classes. Publications that ran his work include Arhiva, Evenimentul, Sămănătorul, Făt-Frumos, Luceafărul, Albina, Neamul românesc, Convorbiri Literare, Convorbiri Critice, Flacăra, Seara and Revista idealistă; among the pen names he used were Emilgar, Em. Maril, Gladiatoru and Glaucos.

Together with George Tutoveanu and D. Nanu, he founded the Sămănătorist magazine Făt-Frumos at Bârlad; it ran from 1904 to 1906. He resigned from the army in 1906 and moved to the national capital Bucharest. He was an admirer of Nicolae Iorga's and influenced by his social and aesthetic ideas, as can be discerned from his first book, the 1905 Bătrânii. Schițe din viaţa boierilor moldoveni. In turn, Iorga commented favorably on Gârleanu's prose work. A familiar figure in the capital's literary bohemian scene, he subsequently entered the Convorbiri Critice circle, where Mihail Dragomirescu became his new mentor. In 1908, Gârleanu helped lay the foundations for the Romanian Writers' Society, of which he was elected president for 1911–1912.

From 1911 until his death in 1914, he directed the National Theater Craiova, where he hired Liviu Rebreanu as literary secretary. In the year of his premature death, he published Proza magazine, the entirety of which he wrote himself. Gârleanu's final weeks were marked by a campaign in the Craiova press, launched by an obscure journalist who wished to secure the theater directorship for himself. Meanwhile, he was recuperating from a kidney operation at Câmpulung. However, an article published in late June and brought to his sick bed by an ill-wisher so distressed the writer that it ended up crushing his spirit, aggravating his illness and hastening his death. He was buried at Bellu cemetery. His translations include works by Guy de Maupassant (A Life), Alphonse Daudet (Sapho, Artists' Wives) and Octave Mirbeau. He published popular editions of Vasile Alecsandri, Grigore Alexandrescu, Ion Creangă, Mihail Kogălniceanu and Costache Negri, as well as a revised and enlarged version of Ioan Barac's One Thousand and One Nights translation.

Gârleanu was a minor prose writer, imbued with nostalgia for a traditional world in which he evokes romantic, "unadaptable" and defeated boyars, in the style of Ioan Alexandru Brătescu-Voinești, I. A. Bassarabescu and Mihail Sadoveanu, but with an added component of romantic melodrama. His preoccupation for dramatic conflict and novel psychological enquiry reveal a more authentic side to the realist narrator of Nucul lui Odobac, Punga and Înecatul. His melancholy, lyricism and gentle irony come to the fore in the naturalist vignettes of Din lumea celor care nu cuvântă (1910), precursors to the stories of Tudor Arghezi.

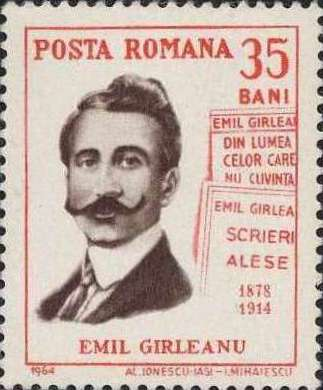
1964 Romanian postage stamp featuring Gârleanu

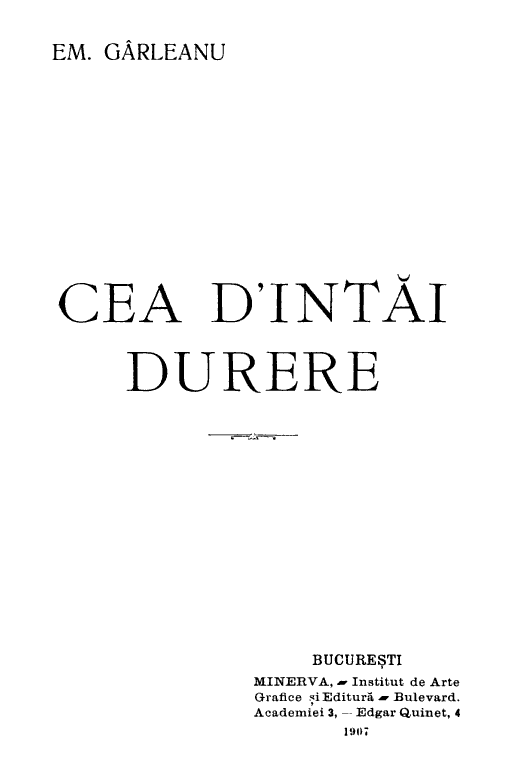
Title page of Gârleanu's 1907 Cea dintâi durere
