= Vasile Voiculescu =

Romanian poet, short-story writer, playwright and physician (1884 – 1963)

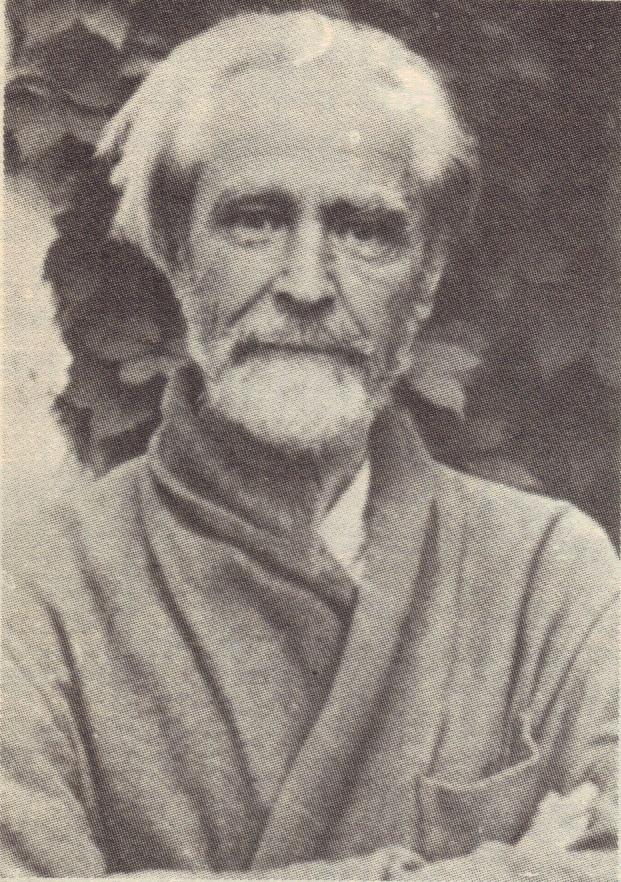
- Portrait of Vasile Voiculescu
- Born: 27 November 1884; Pârscov, Buzău County, Kingdom of Romania
- Died: 26 April 1963 (aged 78); Bucharest, Romanian People's Republic
- Education: University of Bucharest; Carol Davila University of Medicine and Pharmacy
- Occupations: Poet, short story writer, playwright, physician
- Writing career
- Period: 1912–1958
- Genres: lyric poetry, drama, novel, short story, sonnet
- Subjects: supernatural fiction, religion
- Movement: Expressionism

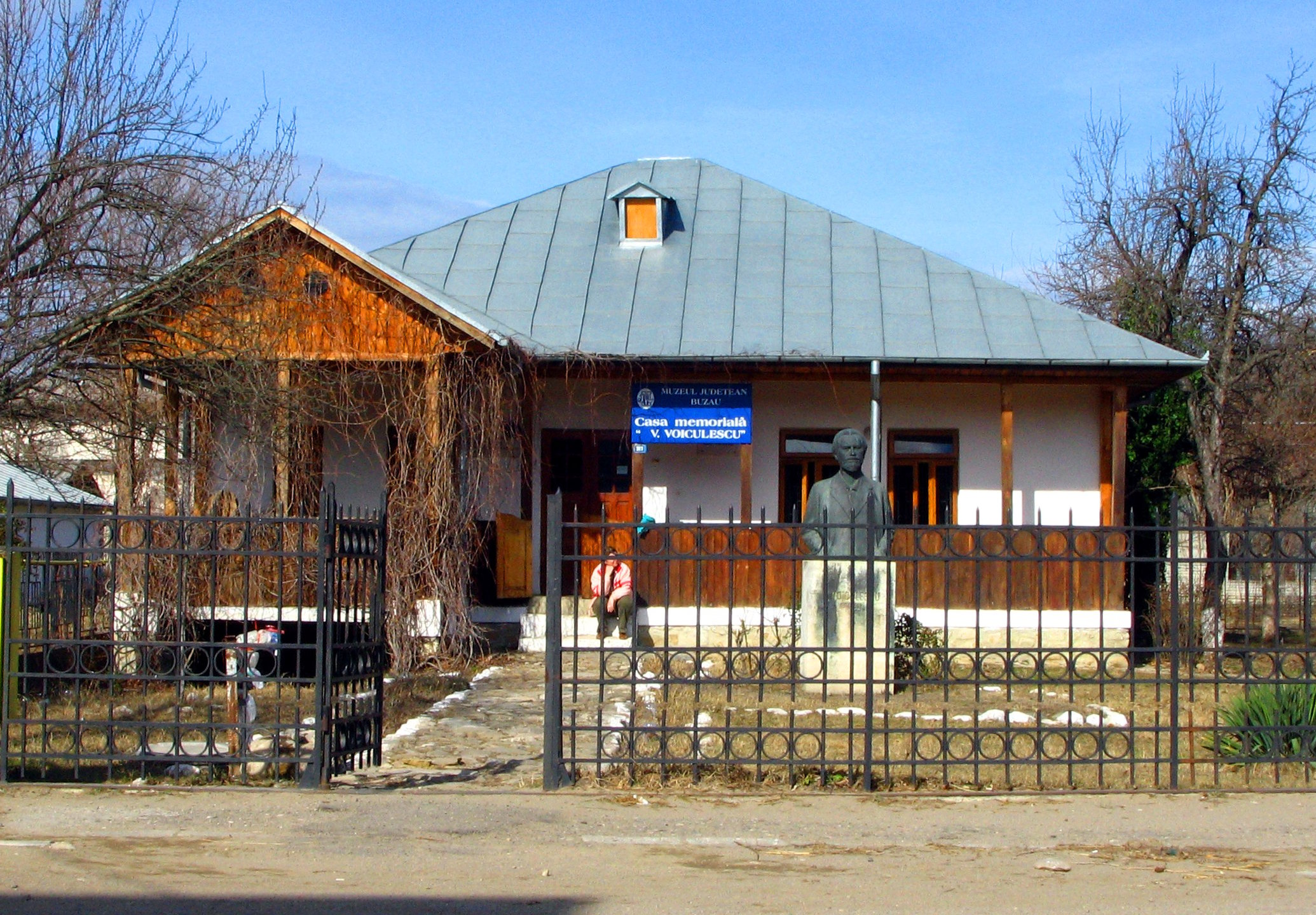
Vasile Voiculescu museum, Pârscov.

Vasile Voiculescu (Romanian pronunciation: [vaˈsile vojkuˈlesku], 27 November 1884 – 26 April 1963) was a Romanian poet, short-story writer, playwright, and physician who wrote under the literary pseudonym V. Voiculescu.

== Biography ==
=== Early life and education ===
Voiculescu was born in Pârscov, Buzău County, Romania, as the son of Costache and Sultana Voicu, who were wealthy peasants. He attended primary school in Pleșcoi, a village near his home, for a year, after which he was sent to a boarding school in Buzău. He attended high school in Buzău, then in Bucharest — the Gheorghe Lazăr High School, where he befriended George Ciprian, an aspiring actor at that time, and the young writer Urmuz.

Upon graduating from high school in 1902, he studied philosophy for a year at the University of Bucharest before starting his medical studies at the Faculty of Medicine. He became a doctor of medicine in 1910.

=== Prominence ===
March 1912 marked Voiculescu's debut as a poet with Dor ("Longing"), a poem first published in Convorbiri Literare. He managed to publish a volume of poems in 1916, but the German Empire forces occupying Bucharest (see Romanian Campaign (World War I)) destroyed all copies. In 1918, he published the volume Din țara zimbrului ("From the Land of the Wisent").

Between the two world wars, he lived in Bucharest and held a series of public conferences on medicine, broadcast on radio and aimed primarily at peasant audiences. He wrote poetry of religious persuasion, themed around the birth of Christ, Magi, and Crucifixion. His literary style gradually became Expressionistic.

Voiculescu published several short stories, such as Capul de zimbru ("Wisent Head"); novels, such as Zahei orbul ("Zahei the Blind"), and plays: Duhul pământului ("Earth's Ghost"), Demiurgul ("The Demiurge"), Gimnastică sentimentală ("Sentimental Gymnastics"), Pribeaga ("The Wanderer").

=== Imprisonment and release ===
After World War II, Romanian communist authorities attacked and persecuted Voiculescu for his religious and democratic ideals, and did not allow him to publish. He was imprisoned in 1958, at the age of 74, and he spent the following four years in prison; he became ill during detention, dying of cancer a few months after his release.

His final work, Shakespeare's Last Imagined Sonnets in the Imaginary Translation of..., comprises 90 sonnets, written between 1954 and 1958. An intricate portrayal of love in all its glory, it was published after his death.

In 1993, he was posthumously elected member of the Romanian Academy. His house in Pârscov became the Vasile Voiculescu memorial house. Also, the county library in Buzău bears his name.

=== Works ===
- Ultimele sonete ale lui Shakespeare/Les derniers sonnets de Shakespeare (Paralela, 2005). Bilingual Romanian-French edition of Last Imagined Sonnets.

== See also ==
- Suciu, Sorin Gheorghe. "V. Voiculescu’s Novel: A Modern Depository of the Traditional Beliefs." Acta Universitatis Sapientiae, Philologica 12, no. 3 (2020): 55-69.
