= Emil Isac =

Austro-Hungarian-born Romanian poet, dramatist, short story writer and critic

- Isac in 1912
- Born: May 27, 1886; Kolozsvár, Austria-Hungary
- Died: March 25, 1954 (aged 67); Cluj, Romanian People's Republic
- Education: Franz Joseph University
- Occupations: poet, critic, dramatist, journalist, translator, academic, politician, diplomat, civil servant
- Writing career
- Pen name: Emisac
- Period: 1902–1954
- Genres: free verse, lyric poetry, memoir, parody, prose poem, satire, sketch story, verse drama
- Literary movement: Symbolism, modernism, Neo-romanticism, Social Realism, Gândirea, Socialist Realism

Emil Isac (Romanian pronunciation: [eˈmil iˈsak]; May 27, 1886 – March 25, 1954) was an Austro-Hungarian-born Romanian poet, dramatist, short story writer and critic. Noted as one of the pioneers of Symbolism and modernist literature in his native region of Transylvania, he was in tandem one of the leading young voices of the Symbolist movement in the neighboring Kingdom of Romania. Moving from prose poems with cosmopolitan traits, fusing Neo-romantic subjects with modernist free verse, he later created a lyrical discourse in the line of Social Realism. Isac was likewise known for criticizing traditionalist and nationalist trends in local literature, but, by the end of World War I, opened his own poetry to various traditionalist influences.

Isac was a participant in civic or political causes, defending the rights of ethnic Romanians in Austria-Hungary from a socialist position, and, during the 1918 union with Romania, served as a community representative. He was however interested in preserving good relations between his ethnic group and the Hungarians. An occasional contributor to Hungarian-language reviews, he reached out over political divides, maintaining close contacts with Hungarian intellectuals such as Endre Ady, Oszkár Jászi, János Thorma, and Aladár Kuncz.

During the final part of his career, which was spent in Communist Romania, Emil Isac was affiliated with Steaua magazine and enjoyed political endorsement. In this context, he took the controversial decision of adapting his style to Socialist Realism, producing a number of political poems which doubled as agitprop.

== Biography ==
=== Early life ===
A native of Kolozsvár (Cluj), a city in Transylvania, the future writer was born to ethnic Romanian parents: his father, Aurel Isac, was a lawyer, later noted for representing the Romanian civil disobedience Memorandum movement, after it was prosecuted by the Hungarian authorities; his mother, Elisabeta-Eliza née Roșescu, was a schoolteacher. As the poet later recalled in a tongue-in-cheek memoir of his childhood: "I was born in Cluj, when the Someș was boiling with blood and my father reaped the flowers of pain [...]. I came around when called upon by my mother—and the priest baptized me in Eau de Cologne, or blood, or tears, or holy water—and my godfather wanted to give me the name Alfred, for he loved Musset, but my father gave me the name Emil, since he loved Rousseau."

From a young age, Isac was an avid reader. As he later recalled, he found an optimistic faith in science after being introduced to Jules Verne's popular novels. He began his education in German, attending a Transylvanian Evangelical Church school in his native city, and later (1895–1901) a Hungarian-language Catholic school run by the Piarists. Isac was eventually moved to Năsăud (Naszód), at a military academy for the Romanian border regiment in Austro-Hungarian service (1902–1904), but, in 1907, took his Matura at the Hungarian Lycée in Sibiu (Nagyszeben). In the meantime, he made his debut in literature. His first published piece was a 1902 essay on the life and work of Romantic poet Vasile Alecsandri, published in Hungarian by Ellenzék magazine.

It was followed a year later by his Hungarian-language translation of two poems, collected from Romanian folklore and printed by the local periodical Koloszvári Friss Ujság under the pen name Emisac. Also in 1903, Isac made his second debut, in Romanian, with La umbra plopilor ("In the Shadow of Poplar Trees"), a poem published by the Transylvanian literary venue Familia. He was later a member of Familia's editorial staff, where, in March 1905, he wrote Jules Verne's obituary. Over time, his other contributions were featured in such Transylvanian Romanian periodicals as Cele Trei Crișuri, Gazeta de Transilvania and Tribuna.

Emil Isac's editorial debut came in 1908, with the lyric poetry collection Poezii. Impresii și senzații moderne ("Poems. Modern Impressions and Sensations"). The work attracted attention from critics, in both the Romanian-speaking areas of the Austro-Hungarian realm and the bordering Kingdom of Romania: Sever Dan in Transylvania and Mihail Dragomirescu in Bucharest both reviewed it for the cultural press. Its rejection of convention was hotly contested by the tribune of Transylvanian traditionalism, Țara Noastră: it called Isac a "bane" for his generation and a "political traitor", referring to his lyrics as "babblings".

In 1910, Isac took a degree in law from Franz Joseph University. It was during this episode that he met the modern Hungarian writer Aladár Kuncz, who was his lifelong friend. Isac's own affiliation with Symbolism was facilitated by a voyage to France, where he observed first-hand the impact of artistic innovation. Reportedly, in 1912, Isac also traveled to study in the German Empire, intending to get a master's degree in Berlin.

=== Political beginnings and Symbolist militancy ===
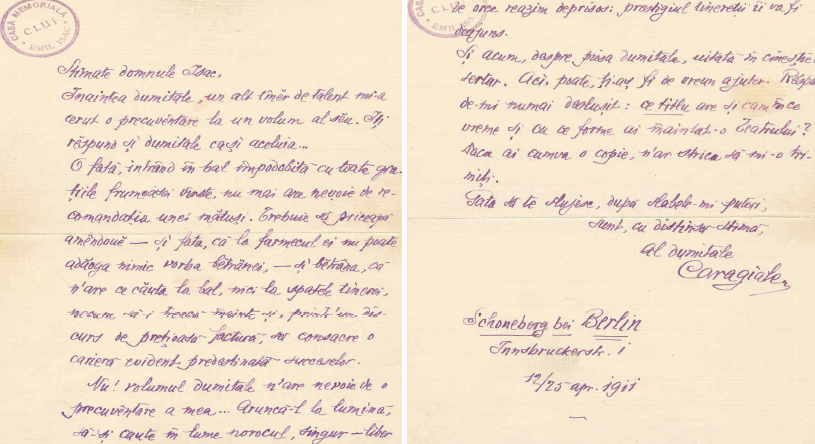
Postcard sent to Isac by Ion Luca Caragiale, in which the latter explains the reasons for not wishing to preface one of Isac's works. Issued from Caragiale's home in Berlin, April 1911

Like his father before him, Emil Isac became interested in advancing the cause of Romanians throughout Transleithania (the regions administered directly from Budapest). This nationalist militancy merged with his advocacy of left-wing causes, leading him to become a member of the Transylvanian Social Democratic Party. After 1911, he was in correspondence with the Romanian National Party activist Vasile Goldiș. The young poet was a frequent traveler into the Romanian Kingdom, and he contributed to periodicals of various cultural and political interests which were published there. His work was thus featured in leftist newspapers and reviews, among them Adevărul Literar și Artistic, Dimineaţa, Facla, România Muncitoare, but was also hosted by mainstream or even traditionalist media (Sămănătorul, Universul). Making his acquaintance with Romania's Symbolist trend, Isac also contributed to periodicals which either tolerated or promoted artistic innovation, among them Noua Revistă Română, Rampa, Seara, Versuri și Proză and Vieața Nouă.

Isac became a personal friend of Vieața Nouă editor, the Symbolist promoter and philologist Ovid Densusianu. The latter referred to his pupil as "Transylvania's talented poet", which perplexed the anti-Symbolist critic Ilarie Chendi; Chendi contrarily claimed that Isac was "made famous by frivolous people". Emil Isac's later memoirs describe in some detail Densusianu's dandy habits and generosity, which the academic kept as a standard even as he was facing material ruin, and note that such efforts accounted for Denusianu being ostensibly "weighed down", "impoverished", "submerged in thoughts".

Although involved in such projects, Emil Isac spend the pre-World War I years building bridges with members of the ethnic Hungarian elite in Transylvania and beyond. He maintained personal contacts with opinion leaders, among them poets Endre Ady, Mihály Babits, Dezső Kosztolányi, and painter János Thorma. Following his interest in Hungarian culture, Isac was one of the Romanians who maintained connections with the influential Hungarian-language review Nyugat, which was at the time equally interested in chronicling Romanian literature. Writing in 1913, Ignotus, Nyugat editor and leading cultural critic, defended the political participation of non-Hungarian communities, commending both Isac and the traditionalist Romanian poet Octavian Goga for their resistance to Magyarization.

While Goga, defended by Endre Ady during his political imprisonment of 1912, soon disappointed the group with his antisemitic rhetoric and his uncompromising stance, Isac remained close to the liberal or left-wing Hungarian circles. After witnessing the end of Goga's friendship with Ady, he was himself involved in a conflict with the former's radical approach, arguing that people "on both sides" needed "to evaluate, without prejudice, their own blemishes and virtues". Around 1912, Isac was working with Kuncz on a trans-communal theatrical project: the staging of Ady's A műhelyben ("In the Workshop") by a theater in Bucharest, to coincide with the Budapest performance of plays by Isac and the prestigious comedy author Ion Luca Caragiale. The project was abandoned, probably because of Caragiale's sudden death in Berlin.

In April of that year, Emil Isac also joined the circle formed around Ion Minulescu and his rebelliously Symbolist magazine, the Bucharest-based Insula. By the same time, the young poet was entering another polemic with the more traditionalist wing of Romania's intellectual movement, represented at the time by historian and literary theorist Nicolae Iorga, former editor of the nationalist tribune Sămănătorul. In 1912, he became a contributor to the short-lived Symbolist review Simbolul, issued in Bucharest by the high school students Tristan Tzara, Marcel Janco and Ion Vinea (all of whom were later avant-garde figures). It was there that Isac published satire specifically aimed at Iorga's group. Those articles where he specifically targeted Iorga's principles enlisted a negative response from Consânzeana, the Orăştie-based review of Romanian Orthodox priest Ioan Moţa (it called Isac Don Quijote de la Cluj, "the Don Quixote of Cluj").

Meanwhile, Isac's articles continued to champion mutual respect between Hungarian and Romanian intellectuals: a letter defending Ady in his dispute with Goga saw print in Ady's Világ review (February 1913), and another one, to Ignotus, was published in Nyugat as Az új magyar irodalom ("The New Hungarian Literature"); the same year, Nyugat also received his Új románság ("New Romanians") essay, in which Isac claimed that the two communities had a common interest in resisting the threat of Pan-Slavism. A year later, at the buildup to World War I, Nyugat published Isac's review of Goga's political play Mr. the Notary, his sympathetic obituary to the neutralist King Carol I of Romania, and his A román-magyar béke ("The Romanian-Hungarian Peace"), which optimistically argued that the policies of István Tisza could limit dangerous distrust between the two sides in question. The same journal published Isac's one-page-long sketch story, A szerecsen ("The Moor").

=== World War I and unionist activity ===
Early during the war, Isac was carrying on with his literary work in the Romanian Kingdom, which still pursued a neutrality policy before joining the Entente Powers in summer 1916 (see Romania during World War I). During that interval, he again outraged the traditionalist public, when his dramolet Maica cea tânără ("The Young Nun"), questioning the Romanian Orthodox view of monastery life, was staged by the National Theatre Bucharest (1914). His second volume, comprising prose poems, was issued in and dedicated to his native region: Ardealule, Ardealule bătrân ("Transylvania, Old Transylvania"), published in 1916 by the Orthodox Diocese of Arad. Isac also contributed his texts to Cronica, a literary and political magazine published in Bucharest by Symbolist poet Tudor Arghezi; this review was later criticized by the mainstream politicians as a venue for collaborationists and Germanophiles. Among the other magazines who received his contributions was the Symbolist tribune Absolutio, published in Iaşi by the Arghezian disciple Isac Ludo.

By 1918, Isac was seeking to obtain an amicable solution to the ethnic conflicts rekindled by the war, in the context of Austria-Hungary's dissolution, the Aster Revolution, and the advent of a Hungarian Democratic Republic. As early as 1917, Isac signed an open letter, published by Világ, in which he rallied with pacifist thinker Oszkár Jászi (who became Minister of Nationalities in the Aster Revolution), arguing: "For us of the [other] nationalities your name in recent months has sounded like a reassuring chime of bells, your name has signified to us vigorous defense, and through your writings democratic Hungary has made its voice heard." Historian György Litván notes that this was the type of messages motivating Jászi to "stubbornly" believe that his Danubian Confederation projects could win support from all sides, even though other reactions were already showing their practical limitations and their unpopularity.

In the end, Isac opted to throw his support behind the unionist movement. He attended the 9th Social Democratic Congress, and was elected a representative to the Great National Assembly of Alba Iulia. There, on December 1, the Romanian socialist clubs, together with the Romanian National Party and the various other civic forces, demanded the union with Romania (see Great Union). According to fellow socialist Tiron Albani, Isac first sparked disagreements within the unionist gathering, after endorsing proposals that the Romanian Kingdom become a republic in exchange for union. Isac's controversial address to his peers, as cited by Grapini, stresses: "a quarter of an hour ago you have approved of the resolution [to uphold civil liberties]. Now you are revolted that a human idea is being expressed. Today, when three emperors have been ejected and their crowns hurled back at them! Would you be more consistent! [...] a king may well be good and wise, but he may also be a tyrant, and he'll still be king". In the end, the socialist delegation renounced its republican aims, placated by a resolution to ensure land reform and workers' rights throughout the resulting nation.

In 1919, as the act of union was being assessed by foreign powers, Isac represented the Romanian lobby as a press attaché in Geneva, Switzerland. Back in Cluj, Isac entered Romanian government service as superintendent of Transylvanian and Banat theaters (an office he kept from 1920 to 1940). He helped set up the Cluj branch of the Romanian Writers' Society (of which he was already a member by that time). His cultural activity in Greater Romania was rewarded with two civil decorations: he was made a Knight of the Romanian Order of the Crown and received the Ordinul Cultural medal, First Class.

Another focus of Isac's political activity was mediating a Hungarian–Romanian reconciliation, both before and after the 1919 military conflict, while reaching out to both Hungarians in Hungary and the Hungarian community in Romania. As noted by literary historians John Neubauer and Marcel Cornis-Pope, Isac was one of the Romanian authors who could combine a nationalist outlook with respect for minority cultures: in his articles for the Bucharest-based Ideea Europeană magazine and the Hungarian Napkelet of Cluj, he demanded equal cultural rights for all of Greater Romania's communities. His call to the "great masses" of Romanians and Hungarians, read: "There is only one possible politics in Romania: the politics of true democracy. By its very nature such politics safeguards the rights of everybody, [including] Hungarians, who lead today an isolated life in Transylvania. [...] it is the duty of Romanian writers to initiate divorce proceedings from the negative traditions".

In his other political articles, Isac notably expressed his alarm at seeing the Regency regime take shape in post-Trianon Hungary, writing that the exiled Oszkár Jászi was preferable as national leader to the authoritarian Miklós Horthy. He gave a positive review to Jászi's renewed campaigning in favor of a Danubian Confederation to replace competing nation states, but argued that there was little prospect of "today's generation", in both Romania and Hungary, to endorse the project. Answering to this objection, Jászi himself suggested that Isac take into consideration the creation of a Danubian cultural Alliance, with "civilized" representatives from Hungary, Romania, the Czechoslovak Republic and the Kingdom of Yugoslavia. Isac, György Litván notes, remained evasive, and, even as Jászi was facing much criticism from partisans of Hungarian ethnic nationalism, as well as from Romanian advocates of centralism, refused to help Jászi and his associate Pál Szende tour the Transylvanian conference circuit.

=== Interwar cultural contributions ===
Isac's return to the forefront of literary debates was consecrated in 1919, when, in an interview for Rampa, he discussed "Transylvania's role" in Romanian culture. In August of that year, modernist literary theorist and reviewer Eugen Lovinescu wrote the article Emil Isac redivivus! ("Emil Isac Brought Back to Life!"), published by his Sburătorul magazine. In the same context, Isac sparked debates by commenting negatively on Poemele luminii, the debut volume of fellow Transylvanian poet Lucian Blaga (his reaction was notably received with irony by poet-critic Artur Enăşescu and his colleagues at Junimea de Nord magazine in Botoşani). Three years later, Isac's Symbolist colleague Davidescu reviewed his entire work in the critical essay Poezia d-lui Emil Isac ("Mr. Emil Isac's Poetry"), contributed for a November 1922 issue of Flacăra journal. For part of that decade, Isac was close to Cezar Petrescu's Cluj-based literary review Gândirea, whose agenda was a distinct mix of traditionalism and modernism, and who later alienated its modernist contributors by switching to fascism. He was also an occasional contributor to Ion Vinea's avant-garde venue, Contimporanul.

In parallel, the poet was pursuing his interest in visual arts, and especially involved in the professionalization of Transylvania's art scene. To this goal, he joined Aurel Popp, George Bacaloglu and János Thorma in setting up the Collegium Artificum Transilvanicorum, an art salon where artists of all trades and ethnicities could exhibit their work (February 1921). From 1925 to 1931, he was also a Professor of Aesthetics at the newly founded Fine Arts School of Cluj, and as such a faculty colleague of several influential figures in 20th century Romanian art theory, painters (Catul Bogdan, Aurel Ciupe, Anastase Demian, Romulus Ladea, Eugen Pascu, Alexandru Popp) as well as intellectuals (historian Coriolan Petreanu, critics Liviu Rusu and Gheorghe Bogdan-Duică).

Around 1926, he was co-opted as a contributor by the venue of ASTRA Society, Transilvania: it published one of Isac's poems and the text of his public lecture Propaganda artistică ("Art Propaganda"). As superintendent of the theaters and cultural activist, Isac also participated, with journalist Ion Clopoţel, on a major cultural reunion of Hungarian, Transylvanian Saxon and Romanian authors (November 1928); other noted participants were Miklós Bánffy, Mária Berde, Egon Hajek, Sándor Makkai, Adolf Meschendörfer, Károly Molter and Heinrich Zillich.

During the interwar period, Emil Isac published several new volumes of poetry and prose, beginning with Poeme în proză ("Prose Poems", Oradea, 1923), and followed by two books of articles and essays, both printed in 1925 under the auspices of the Arad Diocese: Cartea unui om ("A Man's Book") and Notiţele mele ("My Little Notes"). The writer also issued a print version of Maica cea tânără (Cluj, 1931), and two volumes of collected poems, published in 1936 by, respectively, Cartea Românească publishing house and the eponymous publishing company of Adevărul newspaper. These various works kept Isac in the focus of critical attention. Reviews were notably written by: Ovid Densusianu, Claudia Millian and Camil Petrescu (Poeme în proză); Romulus Dianu and Perpessicius (Cartea unui om, Notiţele mele); Tudor Bugnariu, Alexandru Al. Philippide and Eugeniu Sperantia (the other poetry volumes). In 1928, Isac was also interviewed by short story author I. Valerian, their dialogues seeing print in Viaţa Literară magazine, with the general title Un precursor al poeziei moderniste. De vorbă cu d. Emil Isac ("A Precursor of Modernist Poetry. In Conversation with Mr. Emil Isac"). Five years later, the same venue hosted Isac's conversation with cultural journalist Octavian Şireagu: Cu d. Emil Isac despre critici şi modernişti ("With Mr. Emil Isac on Critics and Modernists"). Several other such interviews followed, including a 1936 Adevărul piece where he was engaged by George Macovescu, the leftist activist, in a conversation about "poetry, theater [and] peace". Isac's own leftist views led him to contribute articles for the pro-socialist newspaper Cuvântul Liber.

=== World War II and late 1940s ===
During World War II and after the cession of Northern Transylvania to Hungary, Isac left Cluj for the part of the country still controlled by Bucharest. He made his return to Cluj some time after the August 23, 1944 Coup which toppled the authoritarian Ion Antonescu regime, aligned Romania with the Allies, and initiated the recovery of Northern Transylvania (see Romania during World War II). Literary historians note that he subsequently became, with Lucian Blaga and Ion Agârbiceanu, one of the most important Romanian writers to continue residing in that city after 1945. In 1946, poet Miron Radu Paraschivescu, who had already published a review of Isac's lifelong contributions in Timpul newspaper (1942), supervised the publication of his integral edition, Opere ("Works"). The following year, Hungarian versions of some of his poems were included in the anthology Mai román lira ("Modern Romanian Verse"), published in Budapest.

During the political transition ending with the establishment of a Romanian communist regime, Emil Isac adapted his literary and political stances to the new ideological requirements, sparking negative comments in later exegesis with his effective endorsement of a totalitarian state. His cooperation with the Romanian Communist Party and his endorsement of Romania's political alignment with the Soviet Union resulted in his collaboration on Veac Nou, official newspaper of the Romanian Society for Friendship with the Soviet Union. Of the Cluj writers, he and Agârbiceanu became associates of the communists, while Blaga resisted such advances and was censored. Both of them, however, were for a while equally unsuccessful in setting up new Romanian-language cultural reviews: their projects were rejected by the communist authorities, who would only allow the existence of a Hungarian venue (Utunk) and literary supplements in local newspapers (such as Almanahul Literar, which was published together with Lupta Ardealului).

Although not enlisted in the ruling Communist Party—or, as it styled itself at the time, the Workers' Party, PMR—Isac also received Ordinul Muncii medal, the regime's recognition of social or cultural importance. In 1948, he became a corresponding member of the Romanian Academy. Nevertheless, Neubauer suggests, Isac and the entire Transylvanian generation had by then lost their cultural importance: "Some of the survivors still had a minor career after the war, in Transylvania or beyond it, but the most creative and hopeful years of the generation died with the [world] war."

=== Steaua affiliation and final years ===
Isac was affiliated with Almanahul Literar before 1949, when it was redesigned as Steaua monthly (for long still the only Romanian-language literary periodical published in Cluj). His contributions reflected the politicized editorial line, especially by endorsing the personality cult of Soviet leader Joseph Stalin: his poem Scrisoare către Stalin ("A Letter to Stalin") opened the very first issue of Steaua, and another such piece, Slavă nemuritorului Stalin ("Glory to the Immortal Stalin"), was hosted by the review upon Stalin's 1953 death.

In 1951, Isac was part of Steaua jury presided upon by poet Anatol E. Baconsky, awarding the magazine's annual prize to a high school student by the name of Ion Motoarcă. They were thus the unwitting subjects of a prank, played on them by the anti-communist poet and Sibiu Literary Circle member Ştefan Augustin Doinaş: waging that he could write poetry better poetry than those authors promoted by the regime, and probably enticed by the prospect of financial gain, Doinaş had agreed to hide his parodic contributions under Motoarcă's signature.

Emil Isac died in March 1954, in Cluj. Some of his final works were published later that year: the Workers' Youth organ Scînteia Tineretului featured three pages of his posthumous poetry. The PMR voice, Scînteia, hosted an article signed by communist poet laureate Mihai Beniuc, and similar posthumous homage pieces were published by Ion Brad, Cezar Petrescu, Veronica Porumbacu and, at an Eastern Bloc level, Hungarian author Károly Molter (in both Igaz Szó and Literárni Noviny). In 1957, the same venue published his final text for the stage, Domnul Million ("Mr. Million").

== Work ==
=== Early positioning and Symbolist prose ===
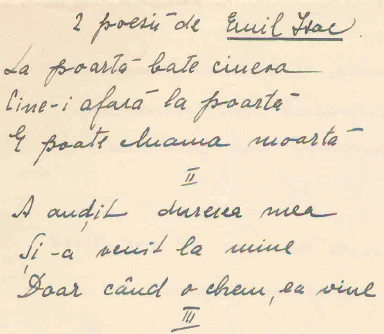
Fragment from Isac's poem Cântec ("Song")

Emil Isac's contribution to the development of modernist literature in Romanian-speaking areas was pioneering: deemed "the first 'modernist' Transylvanian poet" by critic Gheorghe Grigurcu, he was also called "a [Symbolist] exception on the other side of the Carpathians" by literary historian Paul Cernat. Reviewing his own political battles, the poet identified such support for innovation with the rejection of isolationism: "I write these words, these consoled, gentle, tired words, after a violent campaign. And I am tranquil when noting that I was right after all, in maintaining that, to us Romanians, modernism is the only force that may lead to a victory. [...] The world is not aware of us, because our nationalism has sealed us hermetically in front of all propitious influences."

Isac's trademark contribution to the development of Romania's Symbolist movement was his work in the prose poem genre, with exotic reveries borrowing from a cosmopolitan model set in English literature by Oscar Wilde. In general, literary historian George Călinescu notes, these pieces are "willingly grandiloquent and egolatrous, often ending with a pun". According to Călinescu, they merged in style with Isac's various satirical articles, the latter of which make use of techniques similar to those employed by writer and humorist Tudor Arghezi, but display original "Rococo" touches. Isac's basic humorous technique, the critic notes, was one where "the most humble occurrences are eerily detached", such as in depicting a Japanese man's visit to Cluj: "But what is it you're looking for, child of Dai-Nipon, with your typhoon-like soul, here in our home?" Similarly, the Nyugat piece A szerecsen delves into racial stereotypes, discussing the perception of Black men as sex symbols. In one of his Vieaţa Nouă essays, published in 1911 to the irritation of Ilarie Chendi, Isac aimed to prove that Transylvanians were "demagogues"—this thesis quoted liberally from philosophers such as Desiderius Erasmus, Karl Marx and Friedrich Nietzsche.

Another product of this creative period was his main contribution to Simbolul, the faux memoir piece Protopopii familiei mele ("My Family's Protopopes"). The piece was reviewed by literary historians as a relevant step in Symbolism's mutation into the avant-garde. Paul Cernat, who notes its similarity to the prose poetry of absurdist cult hero Urmuz, defines it as "a very modern playful-ironic and imaginative-parodic piece". The text is Isac's answer to political attacks, and indirectly evidences his solidarity with the Jewish-Romanian community. Cernat sees in it: "[Isac's] answers to antisemitic insinuations made by the nationalist publications, intrigued by the [Jewish] resonance of his name." Swedish researcher Tom Sandqvist, who finds the implication of solidarity with the Romanian Jews "quite remarkable", also argues: "The story is also explicitly aimed against Nicolae Iorga and his anti-Semitism, telling how Iorga—obviously—has written that the narrator Emil Isac's omitting to properly pay homage to the great historian and philosopher Nicolae Iorga is due to the simple fact that Isac is a Jew." Written as the short biography of a "decadent joker" in relation to his extended family, Protopopii familiei mele shows its protagonist being visited at his deathbed by some unusually long-living Orthodox clergymen, who present him with absurd gifts.

=== Isac and Symbolist poetry ===
Like many other Romanian Symbolists, from Eugeniu Ştefănescu-Est and Ion Minulescu to N. Davidescu, George Bacovia and D. Iacobescu, Isac made a point of using free verse to as a way of airing ideological differences, and, according to critic Vladimir Streinu, "cultivated literary scandal either in macabre or immoral motifs, or in a meter that defied all norms". Alternating free verse with more conventional forms (he was among the few affiliates of the movement to still appreciate the traditional metrical foot), his Symbolist poetry is defined by Călinescu as a compilation of elements borrowed from poets based in the Kingdom of Romania: Minulescu (in his descriptions of furnished interiors) and Bacovia (the "heart rending" ambiance and the references to musical instruments). According to the same author, Isac viewed his sources in the manner of a Renaissance humanist and "Vlach" author in his relation to Protestant Reformation. Together with the Minulescian or Bacovian elements, the Transylvanian author's poetry followed the other conventions of the Symbolist epoch, from depictions of the autumnal landscapes or everyday tragedies (the burial of an Anglican priest's daughter) to elements which, Călinescu notes, suggest a "tendency of transfiguring the real" (for instance, the ocean life trapped inside a jar, or a waiter's flight to Mars).

One particular trait of Isac's poetic universe is his preference for strong chromatic contrasts. Călinescu, who notes this "pictorial aspect" (and likens it to poster art), supports his interpretation with the fragment from one of Isac's poems:

Contesa şedea pe un scaun de argint. Ochii ei erau albaştri. Am băut şampanie multă.
Contesa a vrut să plângă.
A poruncit lăutarilor să cânte vesel, căci veselia lăutarilor stoarce lacrimi.
Şi la masa de aur au cântat ţiganii negri, din lăute roşii.

Translation:

The countess was sitting on a silver chair. Her eyes were blue. We drank lots of champagne.
The countess wanted to sob.
She ordered the lăutari to sing merrily, for the joy of lăutari wrings tears.
And, at the golden table, the black Gypsies sang, playing red lutes.

Discussing the Symbolists' overall appreciation of "synesthesic" epithets, scholar Carmen Nicolescu writes about Isac's particular reference to the color white when suggesting suffocation:

Nu mai cred în tine,
Sunt robit de ceaţă.
Moare-n mine, moare-n mine
Dragostea de viaţă.

Vine alba ceaţă,
Viaţă, neagră viaţă

Translation:

I no longer trust in you,
I'm trapped by the fog.
Within me dies, within me dies
The love for life.

Here comes the white fog,
A life, a life of black

Maica cea tânără, a one-act verse drama called "neo-romantic dramolet" by Călinescu, shows an Orthodox nun committing murder against the bride of her former lover. Călinescu primarily notes the play for illustrating in dramatic form Isac's generic poetic principles, in particular his use of visual elements such as color clashes.

=== From protest poems to Socialist Realism ===
A second stage in Isac's career came with the reorienting toward certain traditionalist subjects, in particular by taking inspiration from his rival Octavian Goga, the leading voice of Transylvanian traditionalism. Like Goga and other voices in Transylvania, he wrote verse shaped by the influence of Mihai Eminescu, the national poet and mentor of all traditionalist sub-currents. According to John Neubauer and Marcel Cornis-Pope, Isac's interwar career exemplified one of the two schools in Transylvania's Romanian-language poetry: to the current of Emil Giugiuca and other poets inspired by George Coşbuc's elegiac tone, Isac and Aron Cotruş opposed a neo-romantic and "prophetic" attitude borrowed from Goga. While, in Cotruş's case, this came as an ethno-nationalist discourse about "the ethnic and social battles of the Romanians", Isac "combined social realism with Symbolism, offering dramatic-grotesque descriptions of Transylvanian rural and city culture, and depictions of the poet's existential isolation."

The traditionalist elements in Isac's writings were inventoried by George Călinescu. He suggested that the poet merged Goga's "grief" with elements of social protest ("pale workers gathering at the sound of a siren, orphaned children of the moţi") and even imagery related to that of devotional Romanian Orthodox ("Orthodoxist") poets. Another significant trait of his modernist synthesis is, according to Grigurcu, the "air of confrontation between peasant 'health' and the 'decadent' temptation".

This aspect of Isac's career notably produced lyrics expressing his intense love for the place of his birth:

Ardealul este fântâna de aur
Ardealul este mătase,
Ardealul este lacrimi de pâne;
Ardealul este dulce ca mierea
Ardealul este ciobanul cu câne
El este visul fără deşteptare

Translation:

Transylvania is the golden fountain
Transylvania is silk,
Transylvania is tears of bread;
Transylvania is as sweet as honey
Transylvania is the shepherd and his dog
It is the dream with no reveille

The final part of Isac's career was marked by the politicization of his writing, in line with Socialist Realism and its Romanian literary avatar. His poetry pieces for Veac Nou are seen by academic Letiţia Constantin as evidence that Isac had a satisfactory political background from the communist point of view. Constantin describes them as agitprop pieces, stylistically "pastiches" of Soviet poetry. The importance Isac had for the new literary mainstream, shaped in the 1950s by censorship and waves of political repression, was underlined by communist poet Dan Deşliu in a 1956 report for the Writers' Union of Romania: "after World War I and especially in the period of our country's fascization, [...] the flame of poetry continued to burn, lighting the way of tomorrow. With different intensities, its rays are the creation of poets who have long since entered Romanian literary history, such as: G. Topîrceanu, A. Toma, Emil Isac, G. Bacovia or maestro Tudor Arghezi, whom we presently take joy in counting among the active members in our ranks".

The contextual relevancy of Isac's lyrical tributes to Joseph Stalin was assessed by literary historians such as Diana Câmpean and Mariana Gorczyca, who researched the impact of communization on the various literary magazines of the 1950s and '60s. In Câmpean's view, Scrisoare către Stalin as one of the signs that Steaua was "tributary to proletkult demands", as a package for the other content, which was more focused on the "actual" and "valuable" elements in Romanian literature (from the celebration of its dead classics to the recovery of non-political voices such as Blaga). According to Gorczyca, Isac's 1949 poem, together with similar ones by Ion Brad, Victor Felea and Miron Radu Paraschivescu, illustrates the "embarrassing obedience" to a political line imposed on writers by the country's officials. To underline its circumstantial nature, she notes that the Steaua of the mid 1960s (that is, during De-Stalinization) replaced its cult of Stalin with that of Vladimir Lenin, and afterwards dropped most politicized content. In autumn 1953, as Anatol E. Baconsky was facing a political investigation for having opened Steaua to non-political content, official critic Mihu Dragomir suggested that "maestro Emil Isac"'s contributions were a good poetic standard to follow, urging Baconsky to again endorse it.

== Legacy ==
Several literary historians and critics have described the impact of Emil Isac's contributions in the work of other authors, beginning with those elements which were transferred into Adrian Maniu's modernist poetry (in particular, Călinescu notes, the "pictorial" quality the two shared). Among the young Symbolists outside Transylvania, Isac also found a follower in the Moldavian-born poet Benjamin Fondane (Fundoianu), who mentioned his importance as a literary guide in several of his early articles for the cultural press. Outside this context, Isac was the target of two epigrams by Cincinat Pavelescu (a poet who attended Symbolist circles): connecting his visit to Berlin with Ion Luca Caragiale's death in the same city, they mockingly assert that Caragiale would rather die than have to greet the young poet.

Isac's early commitment to radical and cosmopolitan aesthetics, generally perceived as alien by his more nationalist colleagues in Transylvania, left few traces in Isac's native region before World War I. However, through his eventual synthesis of modernism and traditionalism, Isac is credited with having created a school of Transylvanian poets, whose careers spanned the 20th century. This was in particular noted by Călinescu, who found that Isac's "prosaic, abrupt" use of poetic language had been assimilated, alongside echoes from Walt Whitman and Russian Symbolism, into the early works of Aron Cotruş. Likewise, researcher Carmina Tămăzlăcaru speaks of Cotruş's poems as being in the line of Goga and Isac, but modifying it through the adoption of Expressionism.

According to Gheorghe Grigurcu, Isac's poetic language made possible the development of a "cosmic perspective" in Transylvanian poetry, adopted by the traditionalist-modernist Gândirea contributor Lucian Blaga, and later by Steaua poet Aurel Rău. The links between Isac and Blaga had earlier been noted by Călinescu, who suggested that the innovative elements in Maica cea tânără already announce the "stylized iconography" of Blaga's works for the stage, "which is in effect a Transylvanian perspective on things". Gigurcu also notes that Isac's influence in Maramureş was eventually reflected in the poems of Gheorghe Pârja, in what concerns their common view of the rural-urban confrontation.

Emil Isac's work was published in several new editions during the decades after his death. Such volumes enlisted contributions from several authors and critics of the day: Ion Brad, Veronica Porumbacu, György Rába, Elemér Jancsó, Mircea Zaciu, Mircea Tomuş, Ion Oarcăsu, Leon Baconsky, Dumitru Micu, Constantin Ciopraga etc. His contributions were gathered into a definitive Hungarian-language translation, printed in Bucharest in 1962, while his correspondence with Hungarian intellectuals was issued as Hungarian-language magazines and separate volumes, in both Romania and Hungary. His various poems were included into several anthologies of Romanian poetry, or published individually, in Argentina, Belgium, Brazil, France, Greece, Hungary, Italy, the Soviet Union (Russian SFSR, Armenian SSR), and the United Kingdom.

Isac's name was assigned to an avenue in Cluj, and his family home, located on that road, was opened as a memorial museum in 1955. The poet was survived by his son, Dan Isac. A historian and writer, he joined the academic staff of Babeş-Bolyai University, and notably edited his father's correspondence with Vasile Goldiş. During the final, national communist, stage of the Romanian regime, Dan Isac was reportedly made a target of censorship for his alleged closeness to the Hungarian-Romanian community.

Isac's legacy was touched by the fall of Romanian communism during the 1989 Revolution. His memorial home was effectively disestablished in 2001, following an administrative decision of the Cluj County Council, and the cultural items in its patrimony were transferred to the Octavian Goga County Library. However, in autumn 2004, Isac was one of the contributors whose work was paid homage to in Steaua magazine's 50th anniversary issue.
