= Anastase Demian =

Romanian painter (1899–1977)

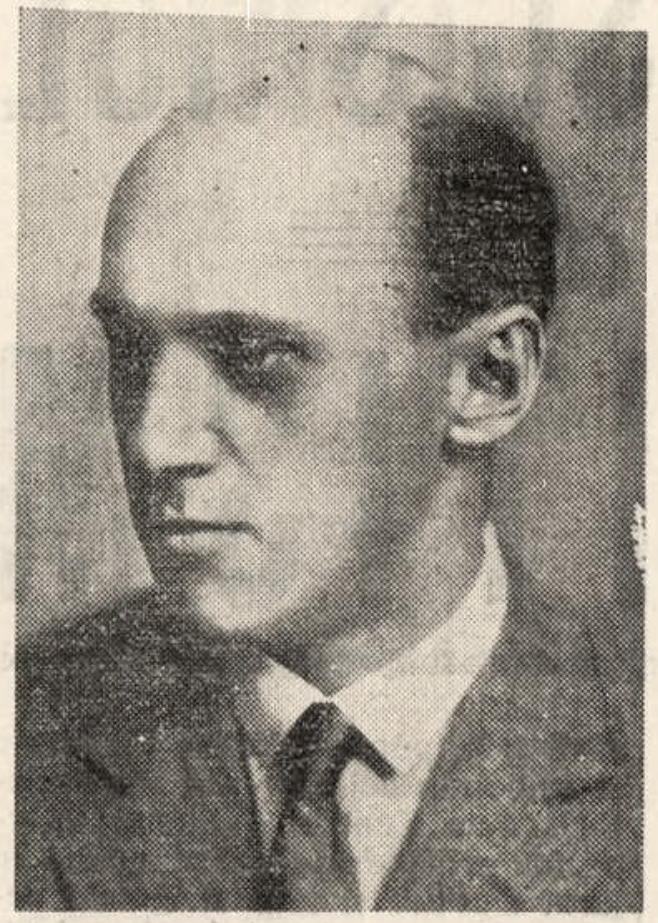
- Anastase Demian, 1938
- Born: May 25, 1899; Budapest, Austria-Hungary
- Died: September 5, 1977 (aged 78); Baia Mare, Socialist Republic of Romania
- Other names: Demian Tassy
- Occupations: Painter, illustrator, professor

Anastase Demian (25 May 1899 – 5 September 1977) was a Romanian painter, illustrator, and university professor.

== Early life and education ==
Anastase Demian was born on 25 May 1899 in Budapest. His father, either named Dumitru or Anastasie Demian, was a bank manager who had been temporarily relocated to Budapest for work, and his mother was Maria Stoia, from Lipova. His paternal grandfather was Dumitru Demian, an Aromanian merchant from Melnik active in Sighișoara. His family relocated to Arad in 1905, and then to Timișoara in 1909.

Demian's father, Dumitru, was an avid reader and kept collections of Viennese arts and culture magazines. Inspired by these, the young Anastase Demian soon began drawing. His father supported his pursuits, sending his son's drawings to various Austro-Hungarian magazines, and even renting a store window in Timișoara to display his artwork to the public.

In 1917, after graduating from high school, Demian was drafted into the Austro-Hungarian Army. He was wounded on the Dalmatian coast and spent several months hospitalized in Sarajevo before returning home to Timișoara.

In 1919, Anastase began studying art at the Școală de Arte Frumoase (School of Fine Arts) in Bucharest, Romania. However, benefitting from scholarship money, he immediately left for studies abroad: first to Rome, where he studied at the Accademia di Belle Arti, and finally to Paris to pursue studies at the Académie Julian. While in Paris, he worked under Maurice Denis as part of the Ateliers d'Art Sacré, a mainly-Catholic artist's collective devoted to creating modern religious art.

== Career ==
Though based in France until 1925, Demian contributed art and illustrations to a number of Romanian publications, including the Cluj-based literary-cultural magazines Gândirea and Erdélyi Helikon, and the Timișoara-based Vremea and Luceafărul. In Hungarian-language publications, he was credited as Tassy Demian (in Hungarian naming order, Demian Tassy).

Demian returned to Romania in 1925, working briefly at the Centrul Artistic Baia Mare (Baia Mare Artistic Centre) before beginning work as a professor of decorative arts at the Școală de Arte Frumoase (School of Fine Arts) in Cluj; he occupied this professorship from 1926 to 1930.

In 1937, Demian was commissioned by sociologist and ethnologist Dimitrie Gusti to paint frescoes for the Romanian pavilion at the World Exposition in Paris. The frescoes consisted of folkloric scenes showing a wedding in an idealized Romanian village. He was later commissioned to paint the Romanian pavilion for the 1939 New York World's Fair.

Demian also worked as a fresco painter for various churches in Romania. In 1936, he restored frescoes painted by Octavian Smigelschi in Sibiu's Holy Trinity Cathedral. In 1939 he was commissioned by Minister of Arts and Culture Nicolae Zigre to supervise the painting of frescoes at the Timișoara Metropolitan Cathedral. He also led the painting of frescoes at the Dormition of the Theotokos Cathedral in Cluj, alongside Catul Bogdan, Sighișoara's Holy Trinity Church, a church in Brașov, and the Stella Maris chapel in Balcic (today in Dobrich, Bulgaria).

He continued to provide illustrations to magazines and newspapers throughout the 1930s and World War II, including to the culturally-pluralist journal Boabe de grâu, the far-right magazine Sfarmă-Piatră and to Lucian Blaga's philosophical journal, Saeculum.

After World War II, Demian continued to contribute illustrations to books (especially children's literature and volumes of poetry), including a translation of the Nibelungenlied by Adrian Maniu, and an illustrated edition of Vasile Alecsandri's Poezii populare ale românilor ("Popular poetry of the Romanians"), and volumes of work by Lucian Blaga, Emil Isac, Octavian Breazu, Sabin Drăgoi, Mihail Sadoveanu, Ion Creangă, and Radu Boureanu.

From 1949 to 1955, he resumed teaching at the School of Fine Arts in Cluj, now renamed Institutul de Arte Plastice "Ioan Andreescu" ("Ioan Andreescu" Institute of Fine Arts).

In 1974, a retrospective volume of his work, edited by Mihail Djentemirov and Raluca Iacob, was published.

Demian died on 5 September 1977 in Baia Mare, at the age of 78.

== Selected illustrated works ==
- Nichifor Crainic and Cezar Petrescu (eds.), Gândirea (1921–1944)
- Lucian Blaga, Tulburea apelor (Cluj: Editura Institutului de arte grafice Ardealul, 1923)
- Emil Isac, Poeme în proză (Oradea-Mare: Tip. Lit. Rom. S.A., 1923)
- G. Breazul and Sabin V. Dragoi (series editors), Carte de cântece... (Craiova: Editura Scrisul românesc, 1932–1938)
- Emanoil Bucuța (ed.), Boabe de grâu (1930–1934)
- Nichifor Crainic (ed.), Sfarmă-Piatră (1935–1940)
- N. Oanea and I.U. Soricu (eds.), Carte de cântece pentru clasele I și II primara (Bucharest: Editura Librăriei Pavel Suru, 1936)
- Radu Boureanu, Satul fără dragoste (Bucharest: Editura de stat pentru literatură și artă, 1955)
- Profira Sadoveanu, Balaurul alb (Bucharest: Editura Tineretului, 1955)
- Cristina Petrescu, Izvorul ințelepciunii (Bucharest: Editura Tineretului, 1957)
- Adrian Maniu, Cîntecul Nibelungilor (Bucharest: Editura de stat pentru literatură și artă, 1958)
- Ion Creangă, Amintiri din copilărie și povestea lui Harap Alb (Bucharest: Editura pentru literatură, 1962)
- A.S. Pușkin, Basme (Bucharest: Editura pentru literatura universală, 1962)
- Vasile Alecsandri, Poezii populare ale românilor (Bucharest: Editura pentru literatură, 1966)
