= Art Museum of Cluj-Napoca =

Art museum in Romania

Coordinates: 46.7706°N 23.5908°E

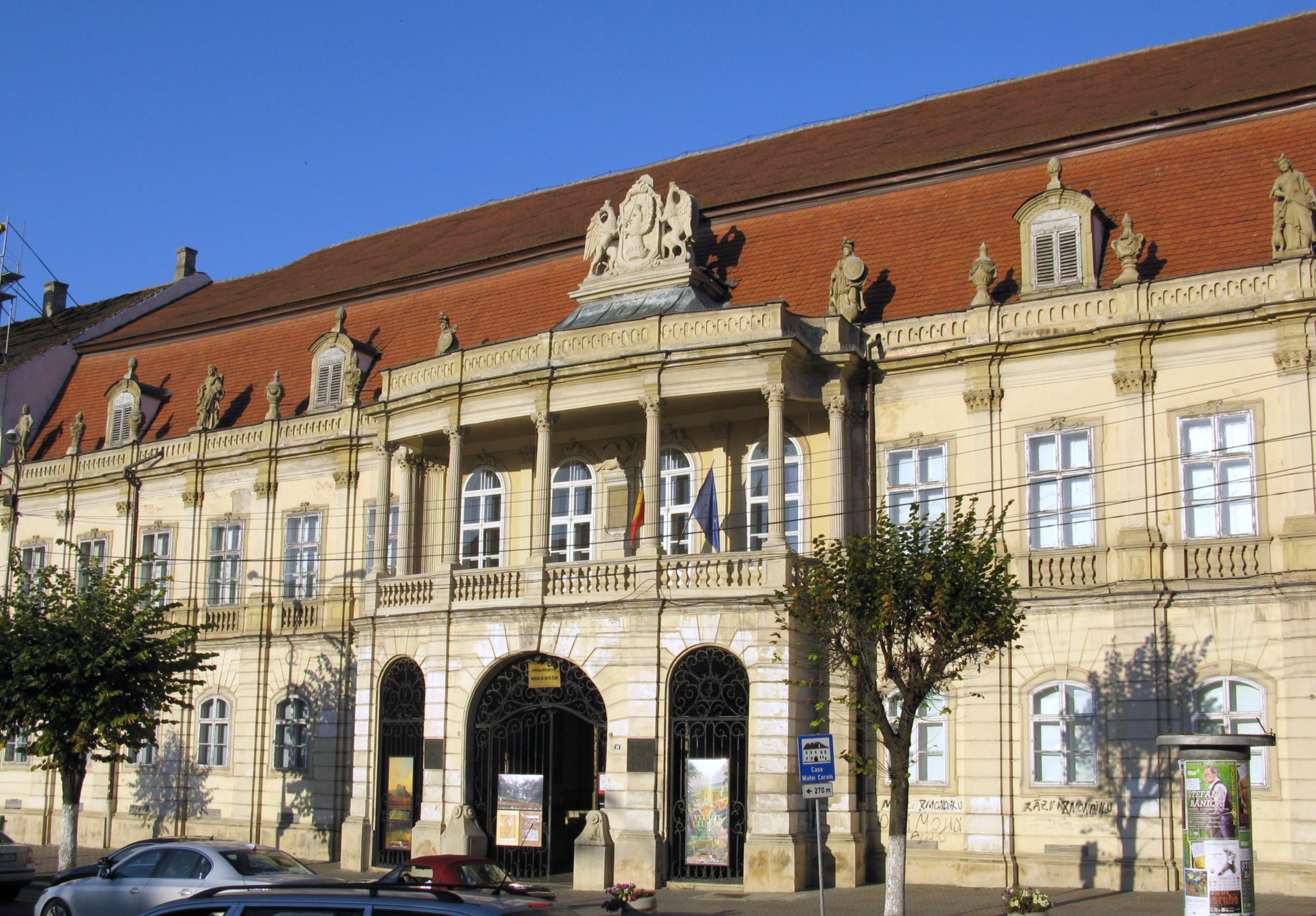
Art Museum of Cluj-Napoca

The Museum of Cluj-Napoca or National Art Museum, Cluj-Napoca, is an art museum housed in an important eighteenth-century Baroque building, the Cluj-Napoca Bánffy Palace, designed by German architect Johann Eberhard Blaumann. The museum possesses a very valuable collection of Romanian and European art: paintings, graphics and decorative art ranging from the Fifteenth Century to the Twentieth.

== History ==
Founded in 1951, the museum incorporated some older collections: a small part of the collection of curiosities, cutlery, furniture and European fine art from the Transylvanian Museum (Muzeul Ardelean) and especially the collection known as the Pinacoteca Virgil Cioflec.

Virgil Cioflec (1876–1948), authored monographs dedicated to painters Stefan Luchian (1924) and Nicolae Grigorescu (1925), as well as some published writings about art, and brought together a collection of great significance for the life of interwar Cluj. He donated his Romanian art collection to Cluj University between 1929 and 1930. The Virgil Cioflec Art Gallery opened to the public in 1933, the first Romanian modern art museum in Cluj. Its collection eventually became the core of the present-day museum.

Since 1951, the Art Museum in Cluj has housed works by artists Nicolae Grigorescu, Stefan Luchian, Dimitrie Paciurea, Theodor Pallady, Camil Ressu, Vasile Popescu, and others, arranged over 20 rooms. The exhibition presents works by artists less known in Transylvania in the eighteenth and nineteenth centuries, namely an important collection of works of great value belonging to the Baia Mare school of painting.

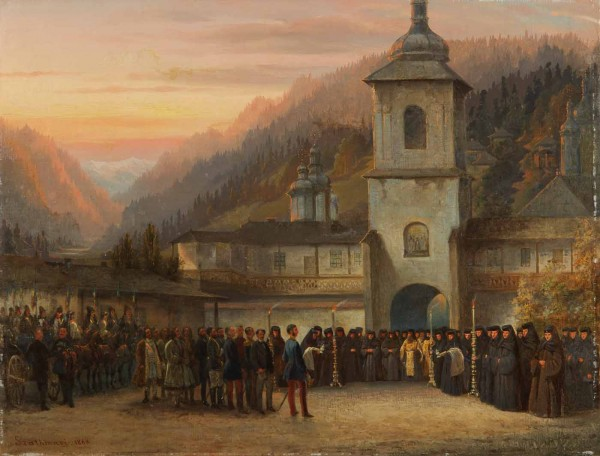
Carol Popp de Szathmary, A royal visit to a nunnery (in display at the museum)

Over the years the museum's collection grew through transfers, donations and purchases. Works of art were transferred by the Ministry of Culture, from the National Art Museum in Bucharest, and by the local government, including pieces by Barbu Iscovescu, Constantin David Rosenthal, Theodor Aman, George Tattarescu, George Panaitescu Bagdasar, Carol Popp de Szathmary, Ion Andreescu, Karl Storck. A further donation came from the Cluj branch of the Romanian Academy (1971), including important works of art from Transylvania (unknown painters of the 18th Century – 19th Century, Franz Neuhauser, Joseph Neuhauser, Franz Anton Bergman, Koreh Sigismund, Szathmari Gati Sandor, Simo Ferenc), contributing substantially to shaping the collection as it stands.

The upper floor of the museum is designated as a National Gallery. In 1990, the National Gallery was closed for reorganization, due to the degraded condition of the building and the need to organize a permanent exhibit of pieces purchased or donated pieces in the immediately preceding period. The National Gallery reopened to the public in January 1996, providing a synthesis of four centuries of Romanian art with an emphasis on artistic phenomena in Transylvania: Altar Jimbor (sixteenth century), Biedermeier paintings, works from the 1900s, and avant-garde artists linked to the Higher School of Fine Arts and Artistic Center Cluj: Alexandru Popp, Szolnay Sandor, Pericle Capidan, Catul Bogdan, Aurel Ciupe, Romul Ladea, Petre Abrudan, Tasso Marchini, Alexandru Mohy, Szervatius Jeno, Theodor Harsia, Kovaks Zoltan, Nagy Albert, Anton Lazăr, Virgil Fulicea, Constantin Dinu Ilea, Ioan Sima, and Egon Mark Lovith.

In 1997, the Museum of Art Cluj-Napoca was nominated for the European Museum of the Year Award.
