= Molter =

Molter is a surname. Notable people with the surname include:

- Dorothy Molter, the "Root Beer Lady" of Knife Lake in Minnesota
- Isabel Richardson Molter (born 1880s), American soprano
- Johann Melchior Molter (1696–1765), German Baroque composer and violinist
- Károly Molter (1890–1981), Hungarian writer
- William Molter (1910–1961), American horse trainer
