= Zillich =

Zillich is a German surname. Notable people with the surname include:

- Heinrich Zillich (1898–1988), German-language Romanian writer
- Klaus Zillich (1942–2026), German architect, landscape architect, urban planner and academic
- Steffen Zillich (born 1971), German politician

== See also ==
- Connor Zilisch (born 2006), American racing driver
- Werner Zillig (born 1949), German linguist and author
- Winfried Zillig (1905–1963), German composer, music theorist and conductor
