= Willows at Chiajna =

1905 painting by Ştefan Luchian

- Sălciile din Chiajna (Romanian)
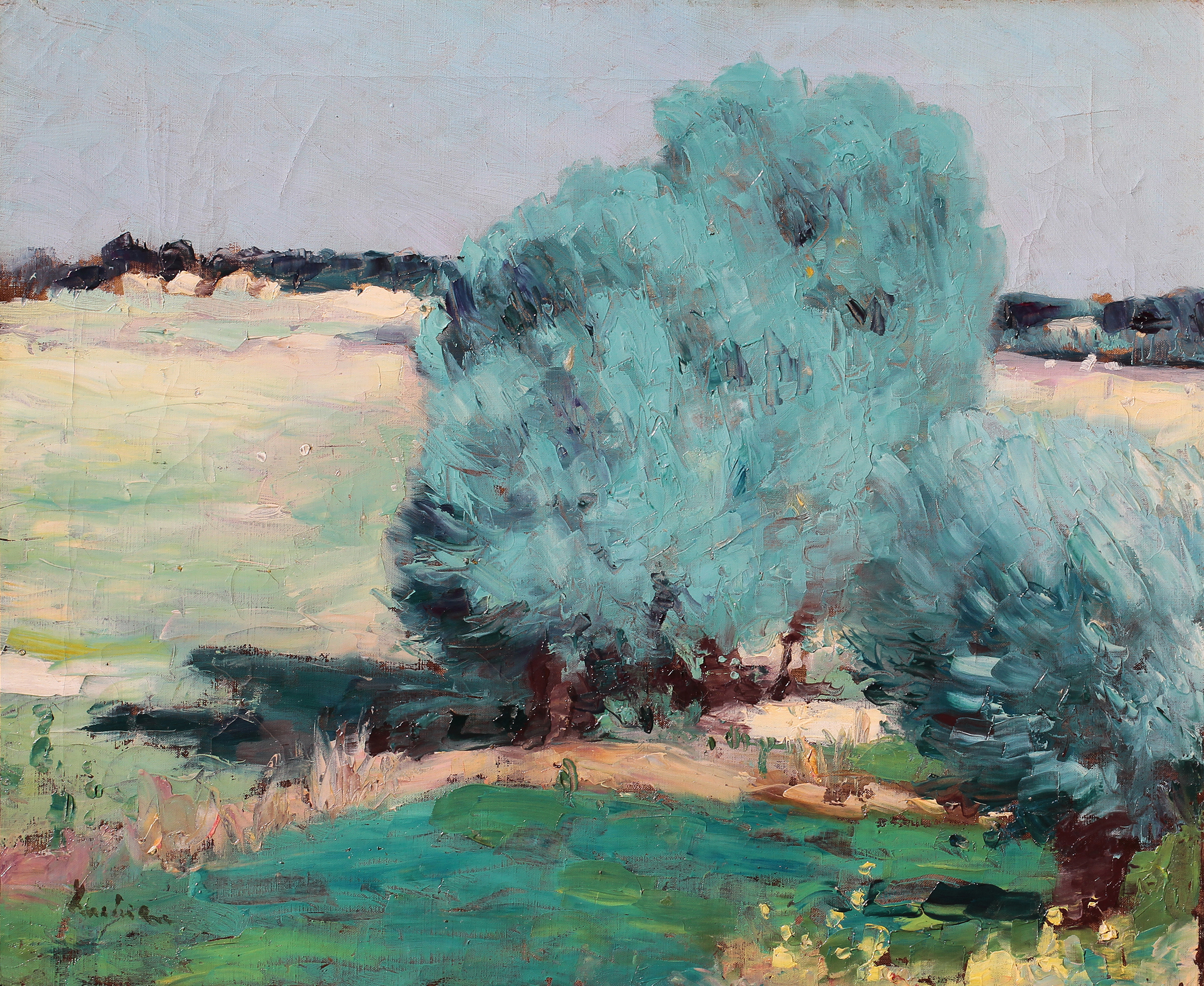
- Artist: Ștefan Luchian
- Year: 1905
- Medium: oil on canvas
- Dimensions: 45.8 cm × 55 cm (18.0 in × 22 in)
- Location: Art Museum of Cluj-Napoca; Cluj-Napoca

Willows at Chiajna (Romanian: Sălciile din Chiajna) is a landscape painting by the Romanian painter Ștefan Luchian from 1905.

== Description ==
The painting has dimensions of 45.8 x 55 centimeters. It is in the collection of the Art Museum of Cluj-Napoca.

== Analysis ==
It depicts a group of willows by the Chiajna village outside Bucharest in the south-eastern Romania, and was painted in one day. The strong colors and thick layers of paint are typical for Luchian's works.
