= Tasso Marchini =

Romanian painter

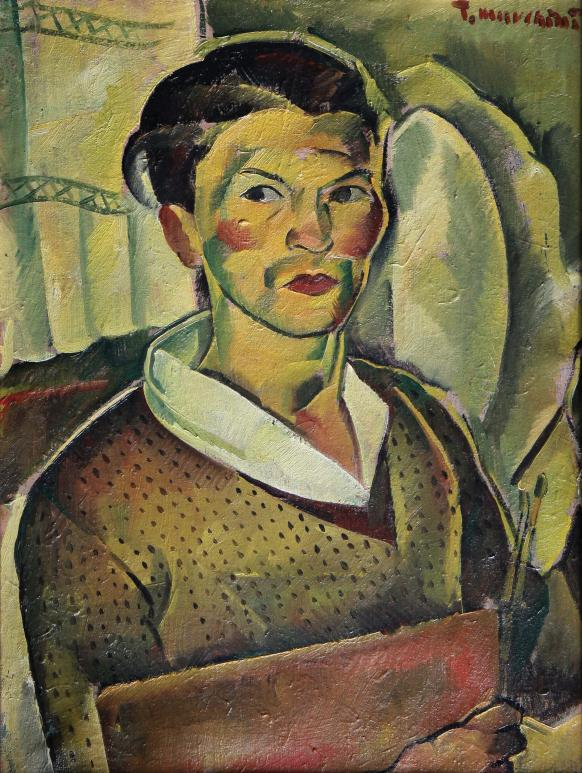
Self-portrait with Palette

Tasso Marchini (22 June 1907 – 19 October 1936) was a Modernist painter of mixed parentage, who spent most of his short life in Romania.

== Biography ==
He was born in Belgrade, capital of the Kingdom of Serbia, to an Italian father and Serbian mother and became separated from his parents during the chaos of World War I. His movements over the next few years are unclear, but in the early 1920s, he appears in Transylvania, where he began his artistic studies at the School of Fine Arts in Cluj.

Being poor, he could not afford to pay the models' fees, so he practiced by making portraits of his fellow students and teachers. It was said by his friend, Aurel Ciupe, that Marchini would wipe his canvases clean to reuse them until they were almost too thin to use. Occasionally, his colleagues would intervene to save an especially good one. The paintings that survived would later form the basis for his early exhibitions.

Between 1926 and 1928, he worked at the artists' colony in Baia Mare. In 1929, he developed the first symptoms of tuberculosis. From 1930 to 1932, despite the strains caused by his poor health, he and Traian Bilțiu-Dăncuș (1899–1975) worked on decorating the Church of the Assumption in Sighetu Marmației. These paintings were damaged during World War II and restored in 2008. Following that, he assisted the brothers Eugen and Eremia Profeta, who were decorating a church in Mănăstireni.

In 1934, he finally completed his studies at the School of Fine Arts and moved to Timișoara. The following year, he and his wife went to Balchik, a resort city on the Black Sea, in an effort to improve his health. Later that year, however, he had to be hospitalized and entered the sanitarium in Arco di Trento. He died there in 1936.

== Selected paintings ==
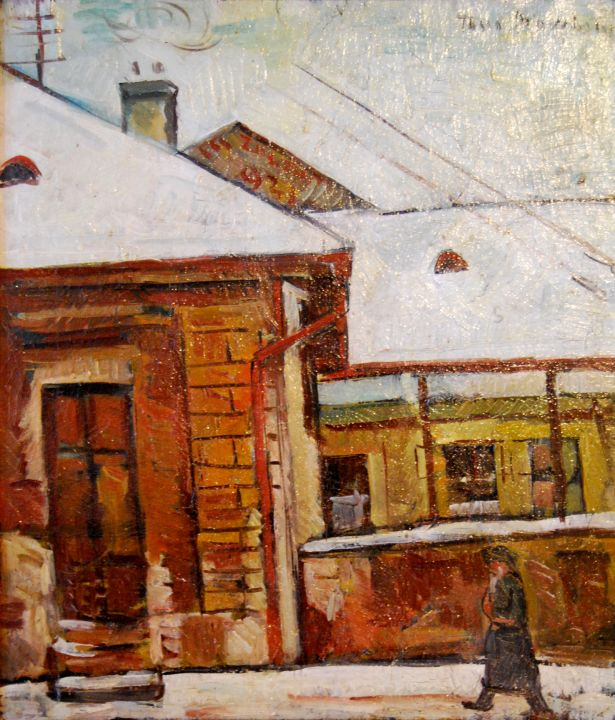
Landscape in Sighet

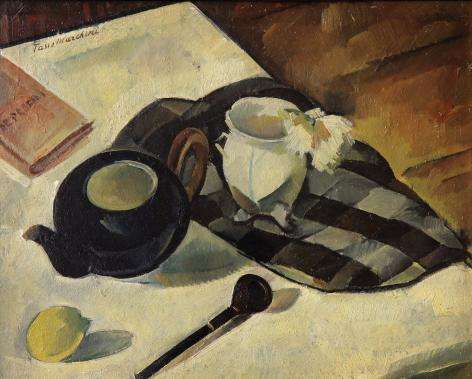
Still-life with Pipe

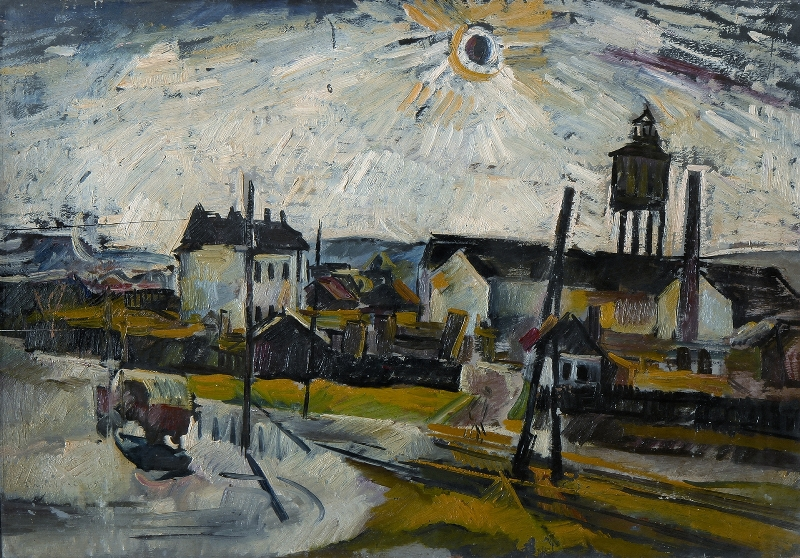
Suburbs

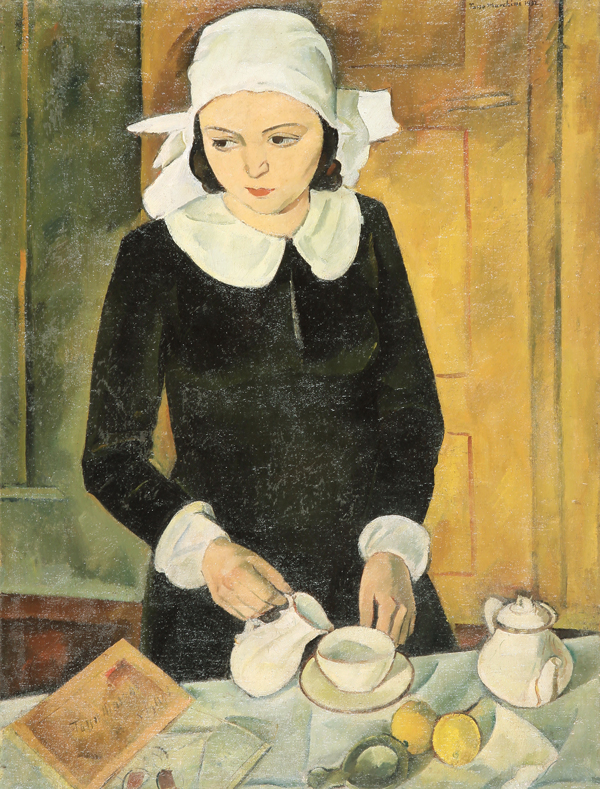
Breakfast
