= Holy Trinity Church, Sighișoara =

Church in Sighişoara, Romania

Coordinates: 46°13′19″N 24°47′45″E

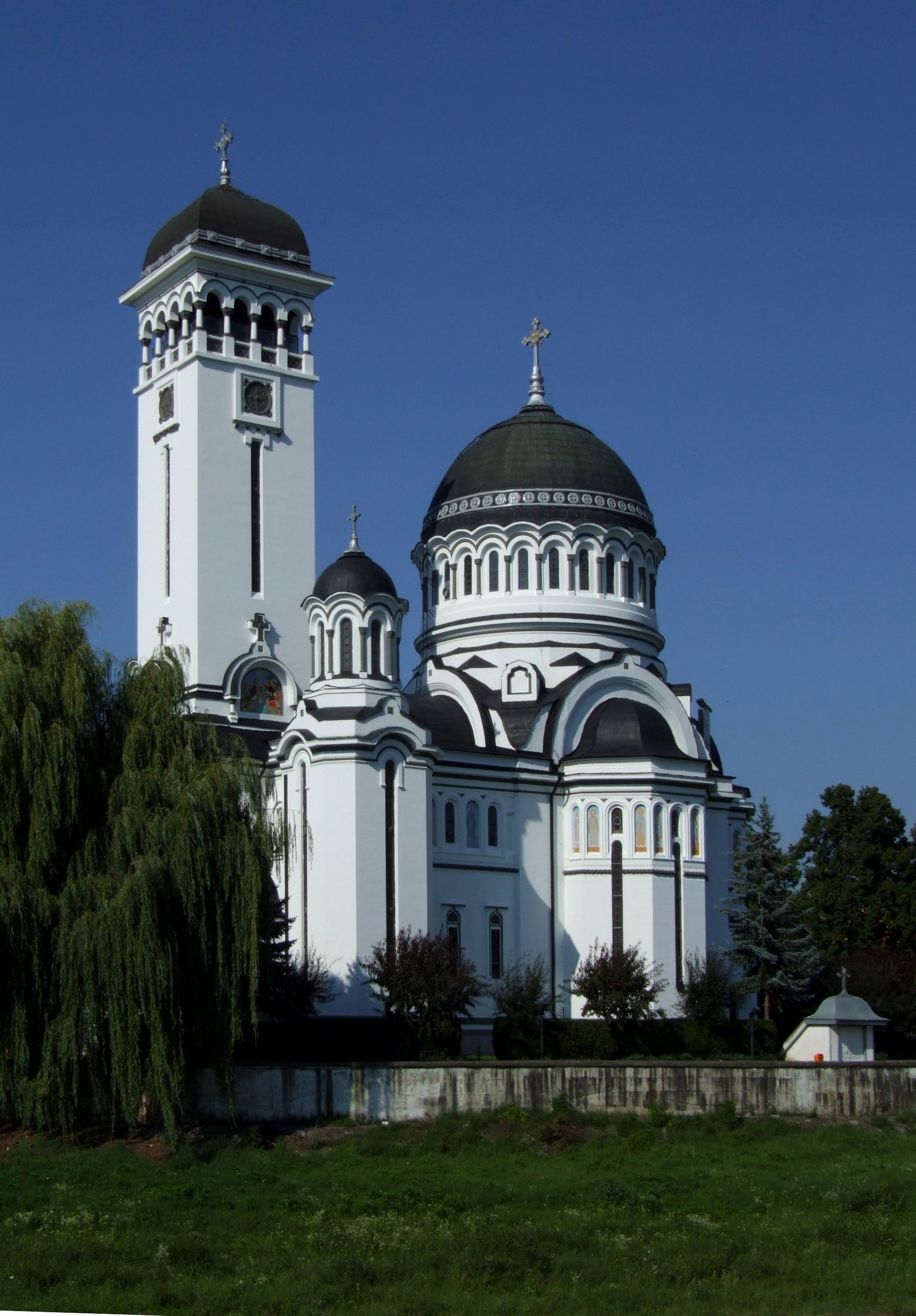
Sighişoara Trinity Church

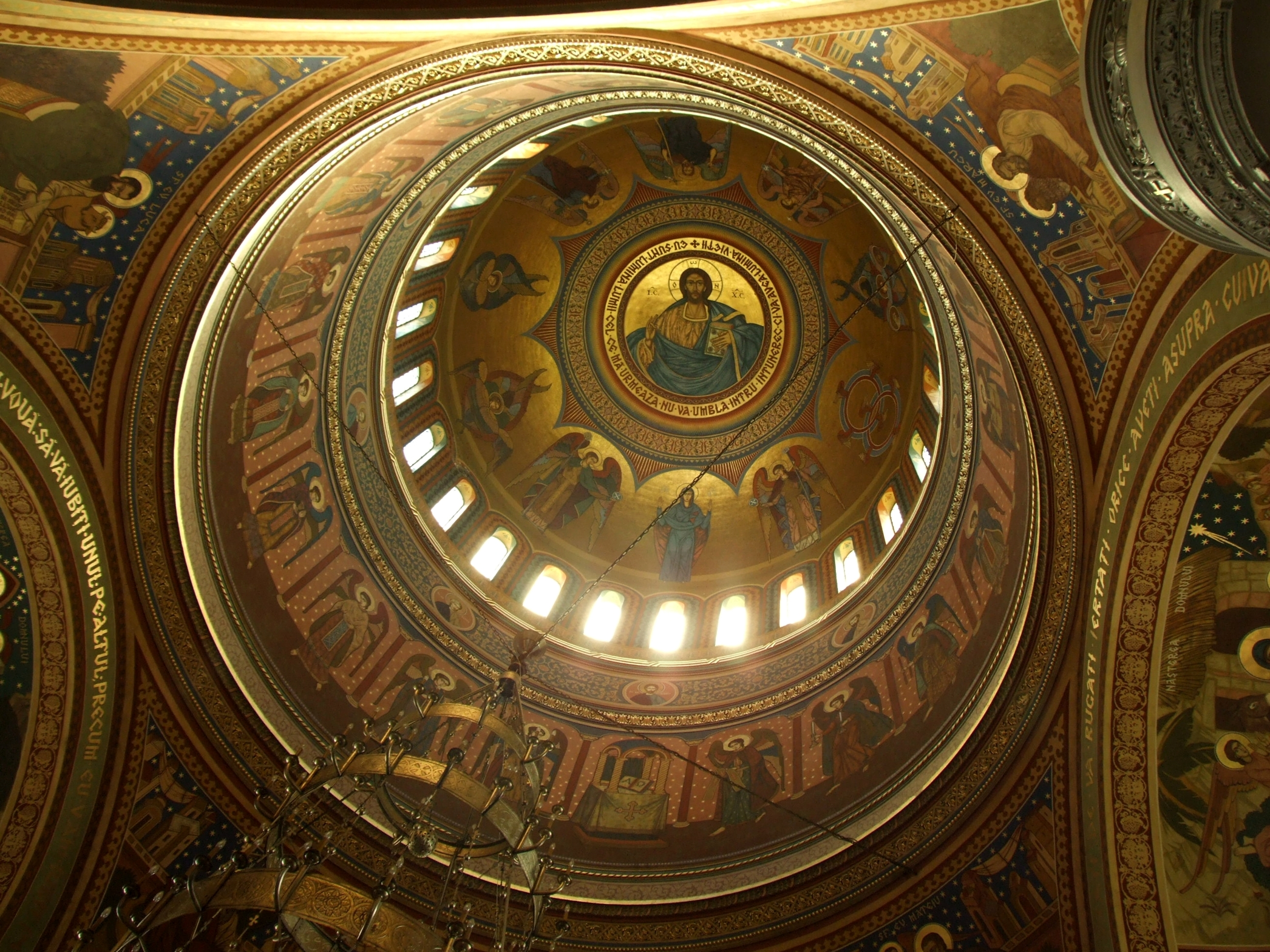
Dome from the inside

The Holy Trinity Church, Sighişoara (Romanian: Biserica Sfânta Treime din Sighişoara) is a Romanian Orthodox Church located on the northern bank of the Târnava Mare River, Sighişoara, Romania. As the seat of an archpriest and not a bishop, it is a church and not technically a cathedral, but is commonly referred to as such.

== History ==
It was built in what was known at the time as Parcul Elisabeta (Elizabeth Park), commencing in 1934, after a proposal to build it in the town center was turned down. Building supervisors were Archpriest Emilian Stoica and Priest Aurel Stoicovici. The church cost 12 million lei: money that came from the management of a 300 arpents of forest that the church had been given in 1925; from donation of religious; from Ministry of Culture; from University of Germany; from the mayor of Sighisoara and prefecture of Tarnava Mare. The 31 October 1937 sanctification ceremony was led by Romanian Orthodox Metropolitan Nicolae Bălan. The ceremony witnessed the presence of 40 priests; 2 ministers from Bucharest and more than 10.000 people.

== Architecture ==
The Holy Trinity Church, Sighişoara was designed in the Neo-Byzantine style. It was built in 1934-37 following the plans of architect Dumitru Petrescu Gopeş, with interior paintings done by the painter Anastase Demian according to tempera technique.

The iconostasis was built by two artists from Rupea, Schiopul and Babic. The smallest of the three church bells (350 kg) was donated by the parishioners, the middle one (730 kg) by Mayor Aurel Mosora, and the biggest one (1430 kg) by County Prefect dr. Victor Stirbet on behalf of the county prefecture. The walls were repainted between 1980 and 1984 according to fresco technique. During these years of repairs an underground chapel for funerals was built as well.

Vox Animi

The church has its own choir, called Vox Animi.

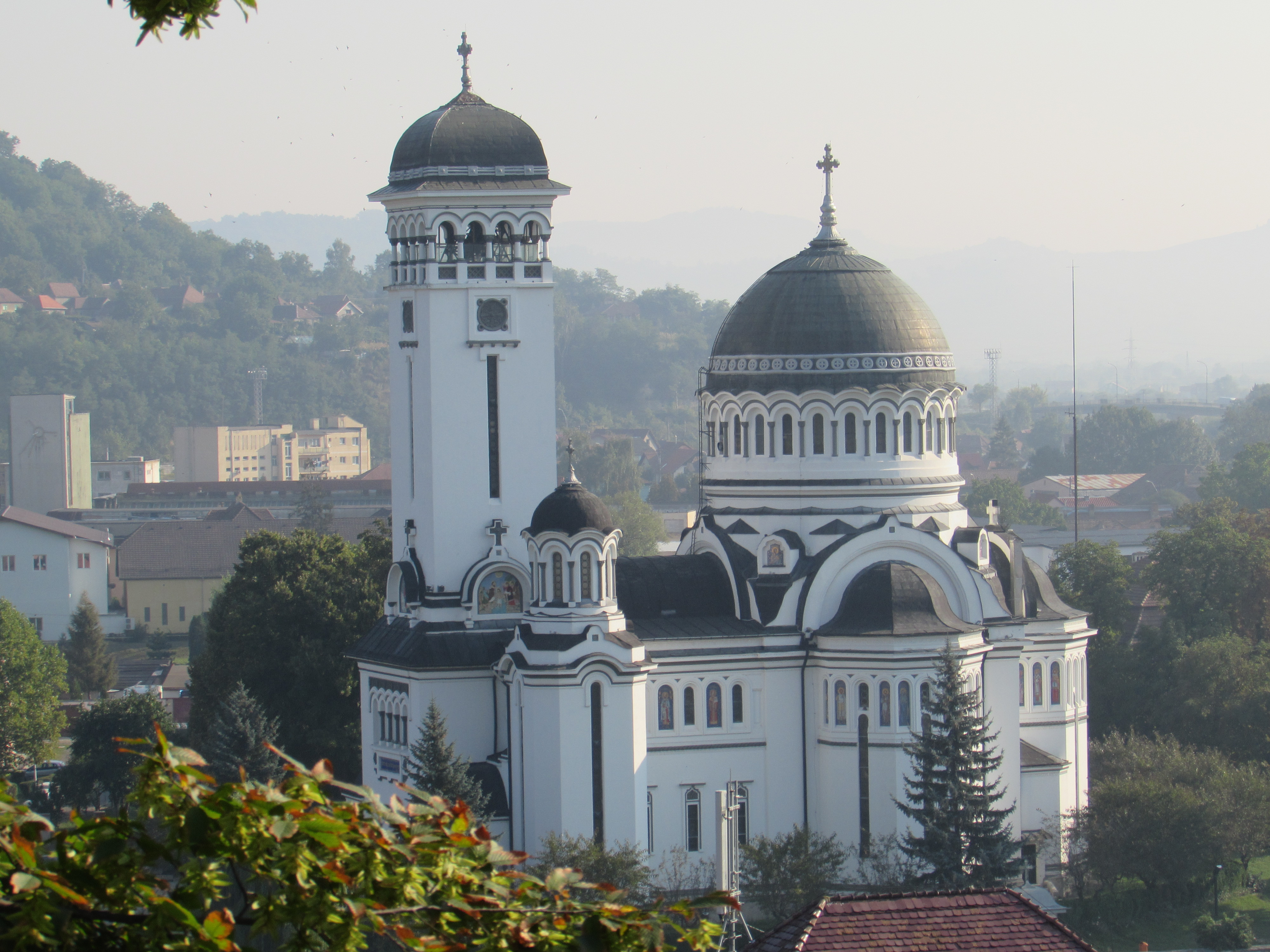
