= Boabe de grâu =

Romanian cultural magazine (1930–1934)

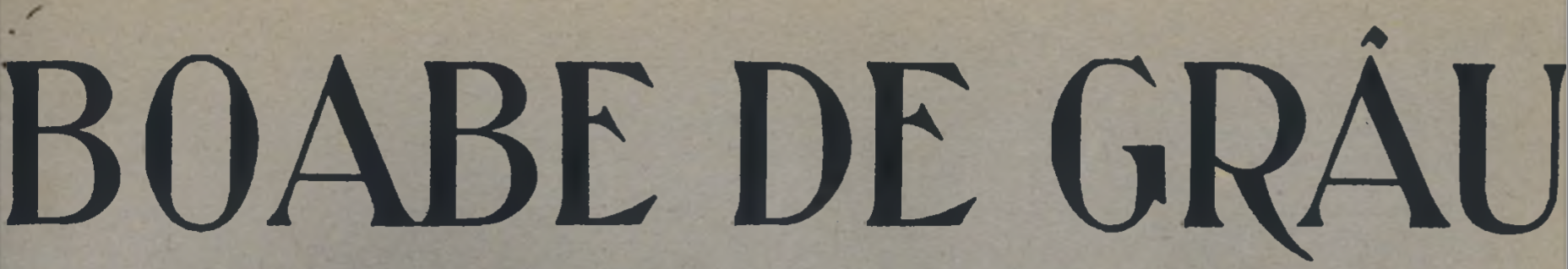
- Editor: Emanoil Bucuța
- Founded: March 1930
- Ceased publication: December 1934
- City: Bucharest, Romania

Boabe de grâu (English: "Wheat grains") was a Romanian cultural magazine published between 1930 and 1934.

== History ==
Boabe de grâu was founded by Romanian writer Emanoil Bucuța in March 1930, and was printed in Bucharest under the direction of Direcția Educației Poporului ("The Director for Popular Education"), Institutul Social Român ("the Romanian Social Institute"), Monitorul Oficial (Romania's government gazette), and the official state publishing house of Romania.

Bucuța had previously served as the editor of the cultural magazine Graiul românesc ("the Romanian Voice", or "the Romanian Language"; subtitled as the latter in French: "La langage roumain") from 1927 to 1929.

Boabe de grâu was published monthly from Bucharest between March 1930 to December 1934. The magazine included cultural and historical articles on subjects local to Romania, including about the culture of ethnic minorities (such as German minorities in Romania, Hungarians, Bulgarians, Jews, Turks, and others). Much of its content focused on archaeology, religion, architecture, ethnography, geography, art history, education, contemporary artists, and Romanian political or social history. It also featured articles on subjects outside of Romania, or articles written by foreigners about Romania, and frequently included articles translated into Romanian from other languages. Additionally, it serialized novels by non-Romanian writers such as Kálmán Mikszáth, Yordan Yovkov, and Borisav Stanković. The magazine was heavily illustrated with photography, historical art, contemporary art, and commissioned illustrations. It stressed the cultural pluralism of Romania; it also regularly featured articles by or about women artists and writers.

Contributors to the magazine included, among others, Queen Marie of Romania, Julius Teutsch, Henri H. Stahl, Grigore Antipa, Alexandru Busuioceanu, Ion Bianu, Nicolae Iorga, Jean Bart, and Gala Galaction.

Artists who contributed to the magazine included Anastase Demian, Iosif Iser, Ion Theodorescu-Sion, Milița Pătrașcu, Nicolae Tonitza, Boris Caragea, and others.

The magazine published its final issue in December 1934.
