= Bolintin-Deal =

- Commune
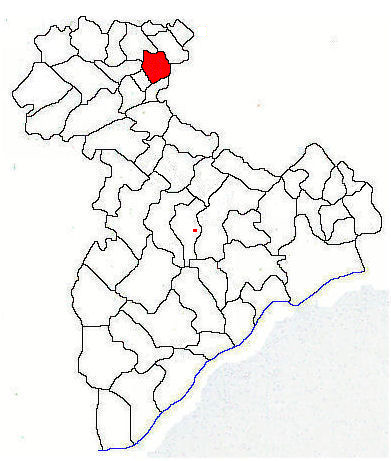
- Location in Giurgiu County

- Location in Romania
- Coordinates: 44°27′N 25°49′E
- Country: Romania
- County: Giurgiu

Government
  - Mayor (2020–2024): Emilian Bănică (PNL)
- Area: 63.27 km^{2} (24.43 sq mi)
- Elevation: 102 m (335 ft)
- Population (2021-12-01): 6,194
  - Density: 98/km^{2} (250/sq mi)
- Time zone: EET/EEST (UTC+2/+3)
- Postal code: 87015
- Area code: +40 x46
- Vehicle reg.: GR
- Website: www.primariabolintindeal.ro

Bolintin-Deal is a commune located in Giurgiu County, Muntenia, Romania. It is composed of two villages, Bolintin-Deal and Mihai Vodă, and covers an area of 63.27 km^{2} (24.43 sq mi).

== Demographics ==
Historical population
Year	Pop.	±%
2002	6,235	—
2011	5,921	−5.0%
2021	6,194	+4.6%
Source: Census data

At the 2011 census, it had 5,921 inhabitants; of those, 99.5% were Romanians and 0.4% Roma. The latter formed a higher percentage of the population before being driven away during ethnic clashes in 1991. At the 2021 census, the commune had a population of 6,194, of which 89.41% were Romanians.

== Natives ==
- Emanoil Bucuța (1887–1946), prose writer and poet
