= Isabel Richardson Molter =

American soprano

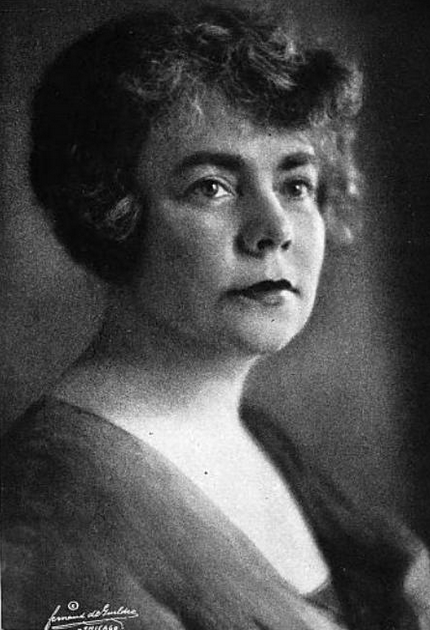
- Isabel Richardson Molter, from a 1929 publication
- Born: about 1885; Cincinnati, Ohio, U.S.
- Occupation: Soprano singer

Isabel Richardson Molter (born about 1885, died after 1930) was an American soprano singer from Chicago, heard in oratorio, concert, and recital settings in the 1920s.

== Early life and education ==
Richardson was born in Cincinnati and raised in the Chicago area, the daughter of George Parker Richardson and Isabel Lorena Adams Richardson. Her father was a businessman from New Hampshire. She lived in St. Joseph, Michigan, as a young woman. She trained as a singer with Franz Prochowsky in Germany.

== Career ==
Molter was a dramatic soprano. She began her career in Chicago in the 1910s, and toured in the United States in the 1920s. She was associated with the David Bispham's Society of American Singers. The New York Times commented that her voice "when unforced, has good quality in its middle register, and her phrasing and enunciation of the texts of her songs revealed true musicianship." The Boston Globe found that Molter "showed keen dramatic instinct, and a high degree of musical intelligence."

Molter sang with the Minneapolis Symphony Orchestra in 1925, and gave concerts at a church in Kenosha in 1925 and 1926. She sang on a radio concert in 1927. In New York, she sang at Aeolian Hall in 1926, and at Town Hall in 1927, and sang on programs organized by the Washington Heights Musical Club,

In 1928, Molter toured in the American South, and sang in at the Texas Music Teachers' Association conference in Waco, and at concerts in Fort Worth and Dallas. In 1929 she performed in Maine and Massachusetts, and was a last-minute substitute in a performance of Handel's Judas Maccabeus in Chicago. In 1931, she sang in Chicago at a concert-format demonstration of Manabozo, an opera by Francis Neilson and William Lester, based on Ojibwe legends.

== Personal life ==
Richardson married pianist and educator Harold Molter in 1921. They had a son.
