= Emanoil Bucuța =

Romanian writer and cultural figure (1887–1946)

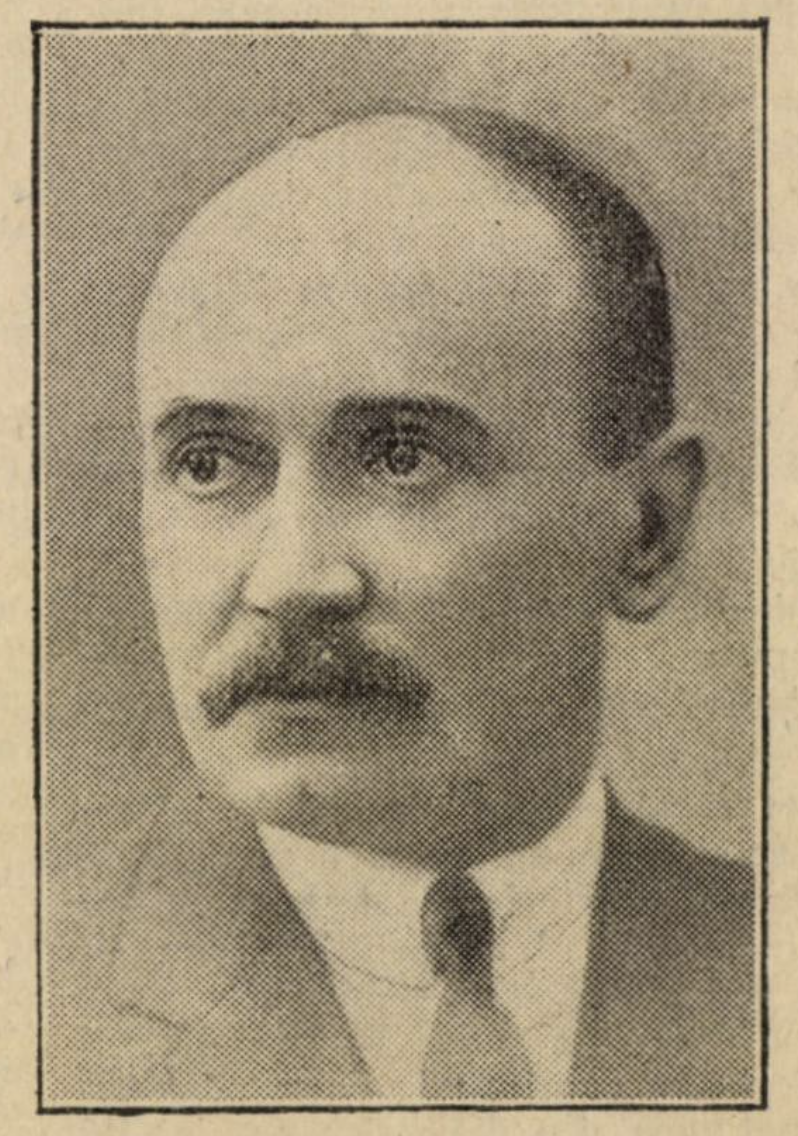
- Emanoil Bucuța in 1927.
- Born: Emanoil Popescu; June 27, 1887; Bolintin-Deal, Giurgiu, Kingdom of Romania
- Died: October 7, 1946 (aged 59); Bucharest, Romania

Emanoil Bucuța (born Emanoil Popescu; 27 June 1887 – 7 October 1946) was a Romanian prose writer, poet, cultural official, and Corresponding Member of the Romanian Academy.

== Early life and education ==
Bucuța was born in Bolintin-Deal, Giurgiu County to Ioniță Popescu, a butler, and his wife Rebeca-Elena (née Bucuța). After moving to Bucharest, he graduated from Saint Sava High School in 1907, followed by a degree in German Studies from the University of Bucharest in 1911. He began his doctoral studies at the University of Berlin in 1912, but was forced to drop out after 1913 due to lack of funds.

== As a writer ==
Bucuța made his prose publishing debut in 1903, in Universul ilustrat (a supplement to Universul newspaper).

His first published volume was a book of poetry, Florile inimii ("Flowers of the Heart", 1920). Literary critic George Călinescu remarked: "[Bucuța] is the first intimist in the proper sense of the word, a poet who sings of his small domestic universe".

He published three novels: Fuga lui Șefki ("Șefki's Escape", 1927; winner of the Romanian Writers' Society prize in 1928); Maica Domnului de la mare ("Our Lady of the Sea", 1930) and Capra neagră ("The Black Goat", 1938).

Bucuța was editor-in-chief of two cultural magazines, Graiul românesc (from 1927–1929) and Boabe de grâu (from 1930–1934). His work was also published in several other journals, including Drum drept, Ideea Europeană, Gândirea, Ramuri, and Viața Românească.

While a student in Berlin, he kept a diary, which was posthumously published as Mozaic in 2004.

Bucuța was primarily interested in Romanian culture, art, and ethnography, including the cultures of national minorities. In Crescătorul de șoimi ("The Falcon Breeder", 1928) and Pietre de vad ("Fording Stones", vols. I–IV, 1937–1944), he collected essays and articles about the culture of Romania and other countries. He also published a volume about ethnic Romanians outside of Romania, Românii dintre Vidin și Timoc ("Romanians between Vidin and Timok", 1923). His magazine Boabe de grâu was mainly focused on cultural pluralism within and outside of Romania's borders, a recurring theme in his work.

Bucuța also acted as a translator. He translated Japanese writer Kakuzō Okakura's the Book of Tea (1906) from English to Romanian in 1926. He also translated poetry by Goethe and Russian popular verse.

== As a political and cultural official ==
After 1918, Bucuța became an active promoter of cultural life in interwar Romania. He served as director at the Ministry of Labour in 1922, at Fundația Culturală ("the Cultural Foundation") in 1925, and at Casa Școalelor ("the House of Schools", which administered funding for schools under the Ministry of Education) from 1931 to 1944. He also served as General Secretary of the Ministry of Religious Affairs and Arts from 1932 to 1933.

He took part in cross-Balkan conferences between 1930 and 1932 which would later result in the Balkan Pact. He also served as delegate to PEN writers' congresses from 1927 to 1933.

Bucuța served as a member of several cultural societies: Asociația Transilvană pentru Literatura Română și Cultura Poporului Român (ASTRA, "The Transylvania Association for Romanian Literature and the Culture of the Romanian People); Societațea Română de Geografie ("the Romanian Geography Society"); Asociația "Hanul Drumeților" ("The 'Hanul Drumeților' Association"); Societatea Etnografică Română ("The Romanian Ethnographic Society"); Societatea "Graiul românesc" ("The 'Graiul românesc' Society", for whose magazine he also served as editor); and Asociația "Les amis de France" ("The 'Friends of France' Association").

Bucuța was elected a Corresponding Member of the Romanian Academy in 1941. As he sadly remarked about his career: "the writer was pushed aside by the cultural figure".

== Later life ==
Bucuța died in Bucharest on 7 October 1946, at the age of 59, after a long illness. He was buried at Sf. Vineri Cemetery.
