= Werner Zillig =

German author and scholar (born 1949)

- Born: 22 October 1949 (age 76); Haßlach, Germany
- Occupations: German linguist and science fiction author

Werner Zillig (born 22 October 1949 in Haßlach, Germany) is a German author and scholar.

Werner Zillig studied at universities in Erlangen, Tübingen and Münster, obtaining his doctorate from Münster in 1981 with a linguistic study on speech acts. He then taught German linguistics at the same school. From 1996 through 2002, he lived in Lille, France. After that, he moved to the Innsbruck area. In 2008, he was named ‘’Honorarprofessor” for linguistics at Innsbruck University.

In the early nineties, Zillig began work on "kommunikatives Controlling," which he describes as a practical linguistic, non-psychological analysis of communication for the purposes of improving it.

Zillig's first fiction was science fiction, in 1978. Later works follow the style of Thomas Mann (‘’Der neue Duft’’ [the new fragrance]) and David Lodge (‘’Die Festschrift’’). He is the winner of the 1990 Kurd-Laßwitz-Preis, for Siebzehn Sätze.

== Publications ==
=== Fiction ===
- Der Regentänzer. Science fiction stories', edited by Herbert W. Franke, 1980. ISBN 3-442-23367-4
- Die Parzelle. Roman, 1984. ISBN 3-442-08402-4
- Siebzehn Sätze. Das Gedächtnis. Zwei Erzählungen, 1989. ISBN 3-89048-305-4
- Der neue Duft. Eine Erzählung aus der Kultur von morgen, 1989. ISBN 3-89048-306-2
- Die Festschrift. Ein Roman, 2004. ISBN 3-937667-00-8

=== Radio drama ===
- “Wir, die Künstler, aber lachen” (WDR) 1984
- “Die Rekonstruktion” (WDR) 1986
- “Die Möglichkeiten von Fiesole” (SDR) 1989
- “Sorglers Rückkehr “(SDR) 1991

=== Scholarly works ===
- ‘’Bewerten. Sprechakttypen der bewertenden Rede’’, 1982. ISBN 3-484-30115-5
- ‘’Jost Trier. Leben – Werk – Wirkung’’ (editor) 1994. ISBN 3-930472-48-1
- ‘’Natürliche Sprachen und kommunikative Normen’’, 2003. ISBN 3-8233-5897-9
- Gutes Benehmen. Anstandsbücher von Knigge bis heute, 2004.

=== About Zillig ===
- Karsten Kruschel: “Wird die Science Fiction geplündert? oder Wie man Science Fiction benutzen und trotzdem ein ‘anständiger’ Author bleiben kann. Einige Anmerkungen zu den Romanen ‘Der neue Duft’ von Werner Zillig, ‘Die Rättin’ von Günter Grass und ‘Sein und Bleiben’ von Gottfried Meinhold.” In ‘’ Das Science Fiction Jahr # 7. Ein Jahrbuch für den Science Fiction Leser. Ausgabe 1992’’, edited by Wolfgang Jeschke. Heyne Verlag: Munich 1992, pp. 441–454.
