= Alexandru Popp =

Alexandru Popp (1868, Dieci –1949, Timișoara) was an Austro-Hungarian-born Romanian artist and the founder of the School of Arts at Cluj.

Popp was born in Dieci, received his initial art education in Arad, and studied painting in Budapest from 1888 to 1896, particularly under Bertalan Székely and Károly Lotz. He later worked with Károly Lotz on murals for the Parliament building, the Palace of Justice, and the Matthias Church in Budapest. In 1900, he was appointed to teach at the Academy of Applied Arts in Budapest, where he stayed until 1918. During his time in Budapest, Popp also visited Germany and Italy. After 1918, he returned to Romania, and in 1925 was asked to organize the School of Arts in Cluj.

Works of Popp are kept in the National Gallery of Budapest, as well as in art museums of Cluj-Napoca and Timișoara.
