= Károly Molter =

Hungarian writer and journalist (1890–1981)

Károly Molter

Károly Molter (Hungarian pronunciation: [ˈkaːroj ˈmoltɛr]; 2 December 1890 – 30 November 1981) was a Hungarian novelist, dramatist, literary critic, journalist and academic. He spent most of his life in the region of Transylvania, being successively a national of Austria-Hungary and Romania.

== Biography ==
Born in Óverbász (Vrbas), Vojvodina region, Molter was from an ethnic German (Danube Swabian) family, but adopted Hungarian as his language. He studied at the College of Kecskemét, and then at the University of Budapest Faculty of Philosophy in Letter (the Hungarian-German section).

In 1913, he moved to Transylvania, settling down in Marosvásárhely (Târgu Mureş). Between 1913 and 1945, he was a teacher in the Bolyai Gymnasium, a Reformed Church college in the city. In the interwar period, after the union of Transylvania with Romania, he became a member of the Erdélyi Helikon group in Marosvécs (Brâncoveneşti), as well as sitting on the editorial staff of Zord Idő magazine. In 1937, he published one of his most successful works, the novel Tibold Márton, which depicted a Swabian family in the process of adopting Hungarian culture, as well as the problems faced by ethnic minorities in their relation to the majority.

After 1945, Molter was employed by the Bolyai faculty in Cluj, where he lectured in German language and literature. Retiring in 1950, he moved back to Târgu Mureș, and died there 31 years later.

== Works ==
- F. m. Melánia R. T. (1929)
- Tibold Márton (1937)
- Bolond kisváros ("Foolish Little Town", 1942)
- Reformáció és magyar műveltség ("Reformation and the Hungarian Culture", 1944)
- Harci mosolyok ("Martial Smiles", 1956; short stories)
- Iparkodj kisfiam! ("Struggle, My Little Son!", 1964)
- Szellemi belháború ("The Intellectual Interwar", 1968)
- Komor korunk derűje ("The Brightness in Our Somber Times", 1971; anecdotes)
- Örökmozgó ("Perpetual Motion", 1974; plays)
- Buborékharc ("Bubble War", 1980; essays)
