= Heinrich Zillich =

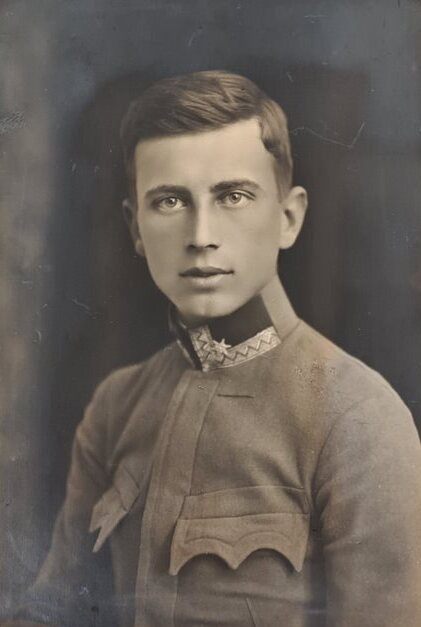
- 1918, in the uniform of the Tyrolean Kaiserjäger
- Born: May 23, 1898 Brașov, Austria-Hungary
- Died: May 22, 1988 (aged 89) Starnberg, West Germany

Heinrich Zillich (23 May 1898, Brașov, Austria-Hungary — 22 May 1988, Starnberg, West Germany) was a German-language, Saxon writer from Romania.

== Biography ==
In 1916 he took the bachelor's degree at the Johannes Honterus High School in Brașov.

He took part in World War I in the Austro-Hungarian army. After 1919 he joined the militant unrest that inflamed Hungary after the union of Transylvania with Romania.

In 1920 he attended commercial school in Berlin and then studied political science, graduating in 1923. He obtains a degree in economics and a doctorate in political science.

In 1924 he began working as a freelance writer. Together with Gust Ongyerth, he founded the art and literature publication Klingsor in Brașov, which he edited until 1939. As editor of Klingsor, Heinrich Zillich questioned the validity of a national as opposed to a European culture and saw the Saxons as the representatives and mediators of European culture in Transylvania.

In 1936 he moved to Bavaria, where he continued his work as a writer. He first received recognition for his work as a leading representative of German literature abroad in 1932 and 1934, when he was awarded the short story prize of Die neue Linie. In 1937 he was awarded the Volksdeutschen Schrifttumspreis (Literature Prize for Ethnic Germans) in Stuttgart, the Berlin Prize for Literature and the honorary doctorate from the University of Göttingen, awarded by the Nazis.

At the outbreak of World War II he became an officer in the Wehrmacht and in 1941 joined the NSDAP. As an officer and political activist he was commissioned to edit a publication of poems for soldiers at the front: Feldpostausgaben deutscher Dichtung. After the war he underwent 'denazification'. He continued to work as a writer and publicist, maintaining contacts with former leading writers of the Hitler era and attending revisionist meetings. In 1959 he became the main editor of the Munich-based Südostdeutsche Vierteljahresblätter, which still appears today.

Between 1952 and 1963 Zillich was president of the Association of Transylvanian Saxons in Germany (German: Landsmannschaft der Siebenbürger Sachsen), and published in the radical right-wing press during the same period. The only difference from his literary and publicistic writings in the pre-war period is the renunciation of homages to the National Socialist system and to Adolf Hitler personally. For the rest, his writings covered all the nationalist themes debated obsessively and consistently over the past century, to which were now added relativisations of the Holocaust and attacks on West German and American democracy.

At that time he was active in organizations of deported Germans.

He continues to receive literary awards:

- Southeast German Literature Prize (Südostdeutsche Literaturpreis), 1953
- Cultural Award of the Transylvanian Saxons (Kulturpreis der Siebenbürger Sachsen), 1968
- Mozart Prize of the Goethe Foundation in Basel (Mozartpreis der Goethe-Stiftung), 1970

As an honorary member of the right-wing nationalist association Deutsches Kulturwerk Europäischen Geistes (DKEG), at the invitation of the Gesellschaft für Freie Publizistik (GFP) Zillich gave a lecture in 1977 entitled Germans in Southeast Europe (German: Deutschen in Südosteuropa).

== Bibliography ==
- Attilas Ende: Eine Novelle, Editura Kerschner, Brașov, 1923
- Wälder und Laternenschein, Sibiu, 1923
- Die Strömung, Mediaș, 1924
- Siebenbürgische Flausen, Brașov, 1925
- Sturz aus der Kindheit / Novellen, Editura L. Staackmann, Leipzig, 1933
- Der Urlaub, 1933
- Die Reinerbachmühle, nuvelă, 1935
- Komme was will, Munich, 1935
- Zwischen Grenzen und Zeiten / Roman, Editura A. Langen G. Müller Verlag, Munich, 1936
- Der baltische Graf, Novelle, 1937
- Der Weizenstrauss, roman, Hamburg Deutsche Hausbücherei, 1938, 1940.
- Der Zigeuner, Editura A. Langen und G. Müller, Munich. 1940
- Flausen und Flunkereien, Editura Bertelsmann, 1949
- Grünk oder das grosse Lachen, roman, Editura Westermann, 1949
- Bekenntnis zu Josef Weinheber, Akademisches Gemeinschaftsverlag, 1950
- Krippe-Lor und der Feuermann, Editura Wancura, 1957
- Siebenbürgisch-sächsische Heimatfibel für Jung und Alt, 1957
- Siebenbürgen, ein abendländisches Schicksal, Editura Langewiesche, 1957, 1982
- Der Sprung im Ring Fackelverlag, 1960.
- Wälder und Laternenschein. Erzählungen aus Siebenbürgen, Editura Mueller, 1983
- Die Reinerbachmühle / Erzählung, Editura Philipp Reclam jun., Leipzig
- Epoche Der Entscheidungen: Die Siebenburger Sachsen Im 20. Jahrhundert de Heinrich Zillich și Oskar Schuster, Bohlau, ISBN 3-412-02883-5
- Siebenbürgen: Ein Abendländisches Schicksal de Hermann Phleps și Heinrich Zillich, K.R. Langewiesche, ISBN 3-7845-3372-8

== See also ==
- List of German-language authors
