= Aurel Ciupe =

Romanian painter

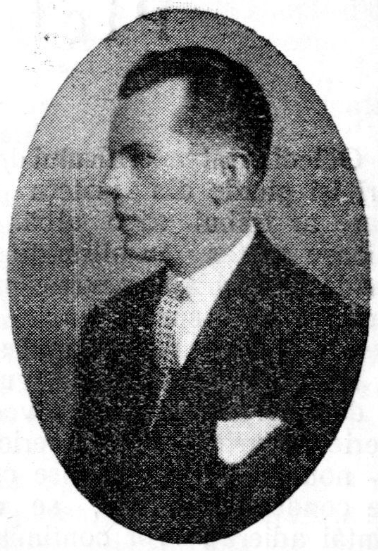
- Born: May 16, 1900; Lugoj, Kingdom of Romania
- Died: July 18, 1988 (aged 88); Romania
- Education: National University of Arts Bucharest; Accademia di Belle Arti di Roma; Académie Julian
- Occupations: Painter, educator, museum director
- Movement: Fauvism

Aurel Ciupe (May 16, 1900 – July 18, 1988), was a Romanian painter, educator, and museum director. He authored numerous portraits, and landscape paintings, and worked within the Fauvism movement. Ciupe was a professor at the Institute of Fine Arts in Cluj, and served as a director of the Museum of Banat (now National Museum of Banat).

== Biography ==
Aurel Ciupe was born on May 16, 1900, in Lugoj, Kingdom of Romania (now Romania). He attended secondary school in Lugoj, and graduated in 1918.

Ciupe moved to Budapest to study fine art and law after secondary school. However because of the political situation and the Hungarian–Romanian War, he moved to Bucharest to continue his studies at the National University of Arts Bucharest (now Bucharest National University of Arts). In 1919, Ciupe received a scholarship from the governing council to study fine art in Paris, where he attended Académie Julian until 1922. In 1924, he moves to Rome to continue his studies at Accademia di Belle Arti di Roma, under painter Umberto Coromaldi.

After leaving Rome, he briefly moved to Târgu Mureş to join his family. Followed by a move in 1925 to Cluj to join the newly formed "Institute of Fine Arts" in Cluj (now Art and Design University of Cluj-Napoca). He also worked as the Museum of Banat (now National Museum of Banat) in Timișoara. In 1928, Ciupe won the first prize at the Bucharest Art Salon.

In 1933, he moved to Târgu-Mureş to work as a museum director at the public art gallery, and took a teaching position at the public art university.
