= Art and Design University of Cluj-Napoca =

Art university in Cluj-Napoca, Romania

Coordinates: 46.779407°N 23.618435°E

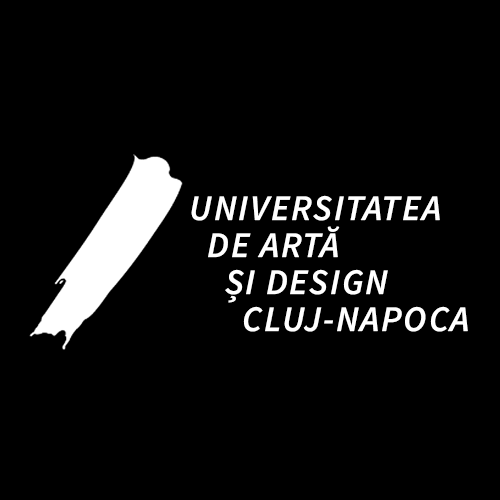
Universitatea de Artă și Design Cluj-Napoca

The Art and Design University (Romanian: Universitatea de Artă şi Design, UAD;) is an art university located in Cluj-Napoca, Romania. It was founded on November 15, 1925, as the Fine Arts School of Cluj. It was formerly known as Academy of Visual Arts "Ioan Andreescu" until 30 June 2000.

== Faculties ==
The university has two faculties:

- Faculty of Graphic Arts
- Faculty of Decorative Arts and Design

== Undergraduate school ==
The undergraduate school includes the following departments:

- Department of Painting
- Department of Sculpture
- Department of Graphic Arts - Drawing - Painting - Printmaking - Illustration - Graphic design
- Department of Fine arts, Photography and Video processing
- Department of Conservation and Restoration
- Department of Art education and Decorative arts
- Department of Ceramics - Glass
- Department of Textile arts and Textile design
- Department of Wardrobe stylist and Fashion design
- Department of Design and Industrial design
- Department of Art history and Theory of art

== Graduate school ==
The graduate school offers the following degree programs:

- Master's degrees in Painting
- Master's degrees in Sculpture
- Master's degrees in Drawing, Painting and Printmaking
- Master's degrees in Comic book and Animation
- Master's degrees in Photography and Videography
- Master's degrees in Conservation and Restoration
- Master's degrees in Ceramics - Glass
- Master's degrees in Textile design
- Master's degrees in Fashion design
- Master's degrees in Design
- Master's degrees in Contemporary curatorial practices
- PhD in Visual Arts
